= Main campus of the Georgia Institute of Technology =

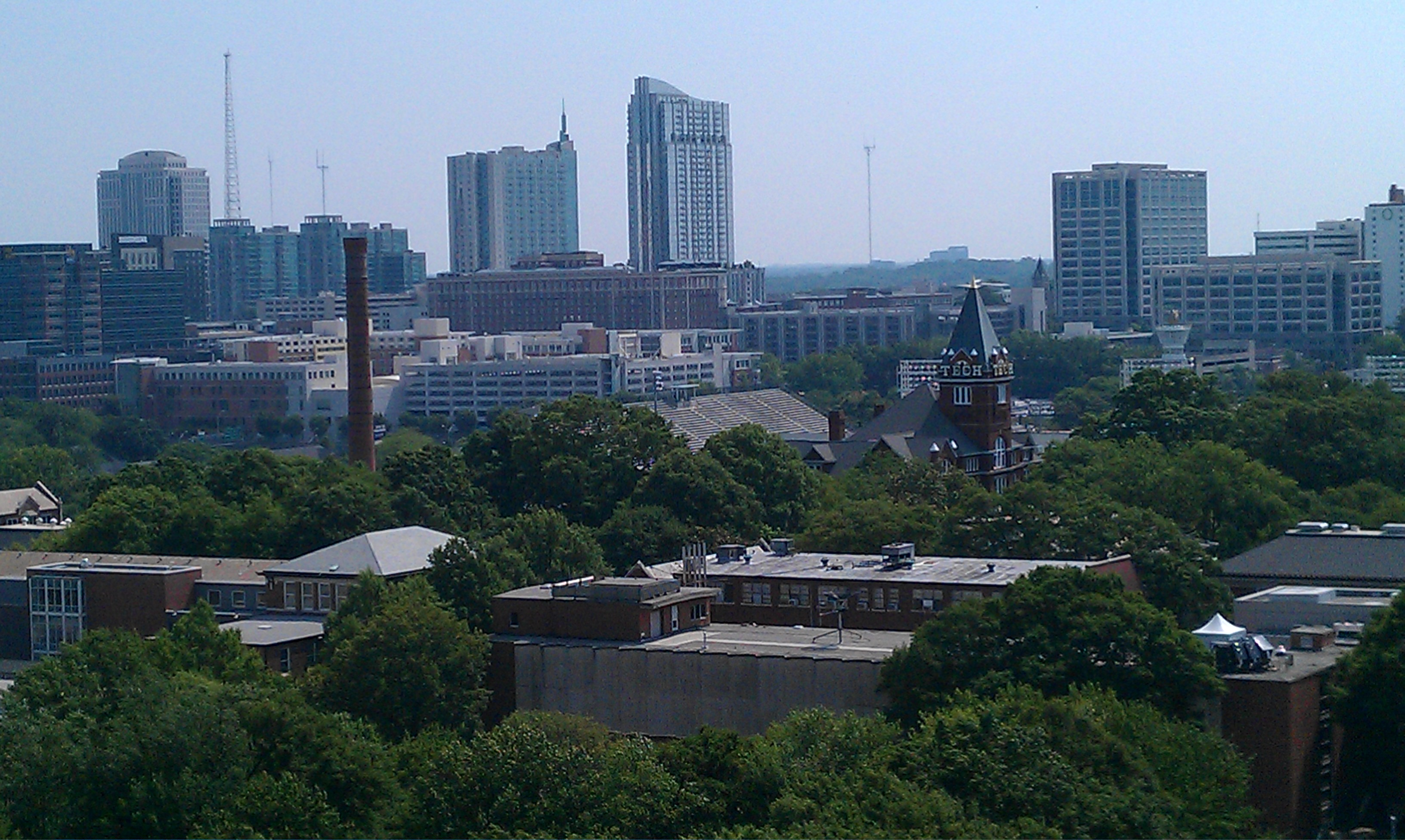
Tech Tower and Georgia Tech's East Campus in 2011 with Atlanta skyline in the background (Picture taken facing east)

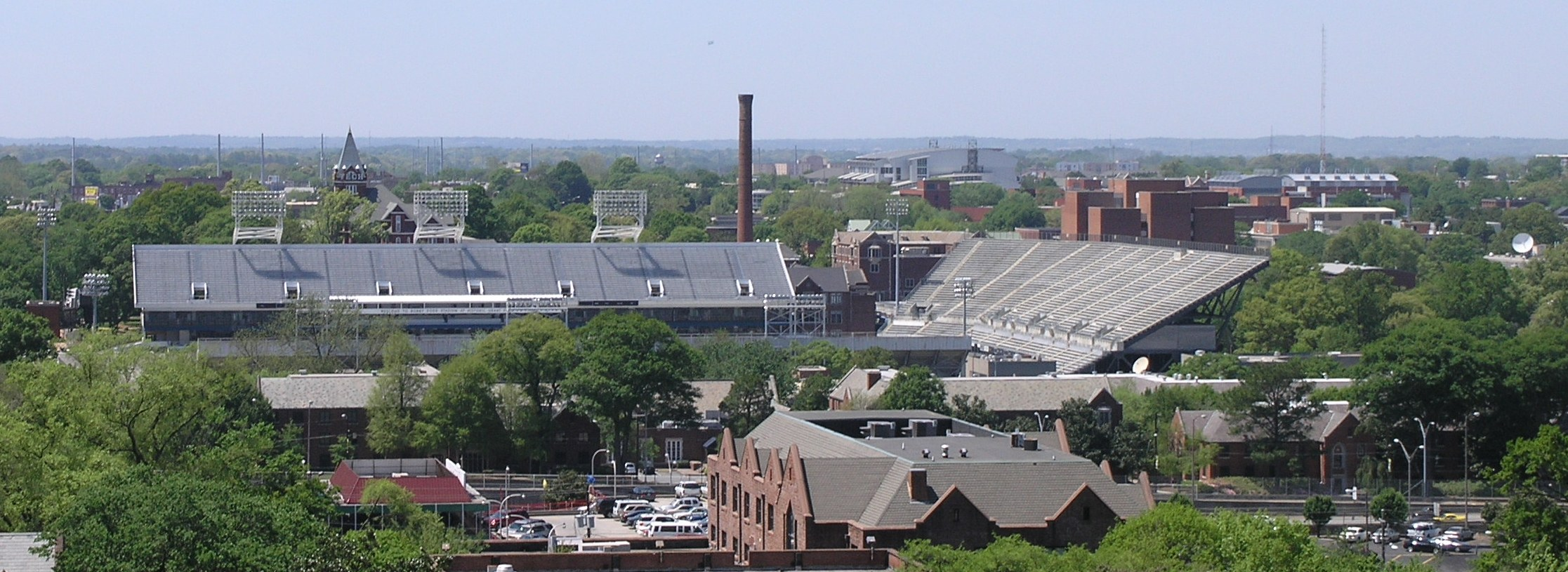
Georgia Tech's East Campus and Central Campus as seen from an elevated point near Peachtree Street and North Avenue (Picture taken facing west)

The main campus of the Georgia Institute of Technology occupies part of Midtown Atlanta, primarily bordered by 10th Street to the north, North Avenue to the south, and the Downtown Connector to the East, placing it well in sight of the Atlanta skyline. In 1996, the campus was the site of the athletes' village and a venue for a number of athletic events for the 1996 Summer Olympics. The construction of the Olympic Village, along with subsequent gentrification of the surrounding areas, significantly changed the campus.

The Georgia Tech campus is located in Midtown, an area north of downtown Atlanta. Although a number of skyscrapers (most visibly AT&T Midtown Center, One Coca-Cola Plaza, and Bank of America Plaza) are visible from all points on campus, the campus itself has few buildings over four stories and has a great deal of greenery. This gives it a distinctly suburban atmosphere quite different from other Atlanta campuses such as that of Georgia State University.

In addition to the main campus, Georgia Tech also operates satellite campuses in Savannah, Georgia (Georgia Tech Savannah); Metz, France (Georgia Tech Lorraine); Athlone, Ireland; Shenzhen, China; and Singapore.

== History ==
As noted by a historical marker on the large hill in Central Campus, the site occupied by the school's first buildings once held fortifications built to protect Atlanta during the Atlanta campaign of the American Civil War. The surrender of the city took place on the southwestern boundary of the modern Georgia Tech campus in 1864.

The Georgia School of Technology opened its doors in the fall of 1888 with only two buildings, under the leadership of professor and pastor Isaac S. Hopkins. One building (now Tech Tower, the main administrative complex) had classrooms to teach students; the other featured a workshop with a foundry, forge, boiler room, and engine room. It was designed specifically as a "contract shop" where students would work to produce goods to sell, creating revenue for the school while the students learned vocational skills in a "hands-on" manner.

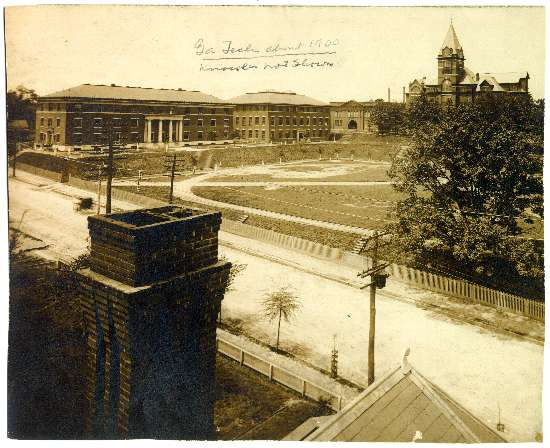
Georgia Tech around 1900, with Tech Tower in the background

A 1965 plan signaled the beginning of Tech's expansion to include what is now West Campus. The area west of Hemphill Avenue, for decades the campus' western border, was then a working-class multiracial neighborhood, and Hemphill itself was a major city thoroughfare connecting Buckhead, the Atlantic Steel Mill, Techwood Homes and Downtown.

In 1994, G. Wayne Clough became the first Tech alumnus to serve as the president of the institute. While Clough was in office, around $1 billion was spent on expanding and improving the campus. These projects include the construction of the Manufacturing Related Disciplines Complex, 10th and Home, Tech Square, The Biomedical Complex, the completion and subsequent renovations of several west campus dorms, the Student Center renovation, the expanded 5th Street Bridge, the Georgia Tech Aquatic Center's renovation into the CRC, the new Health Center, the Klaus Advanced Computing Building, the Molecular Science and Engineering Building, and the Nanotechnology Research Center.

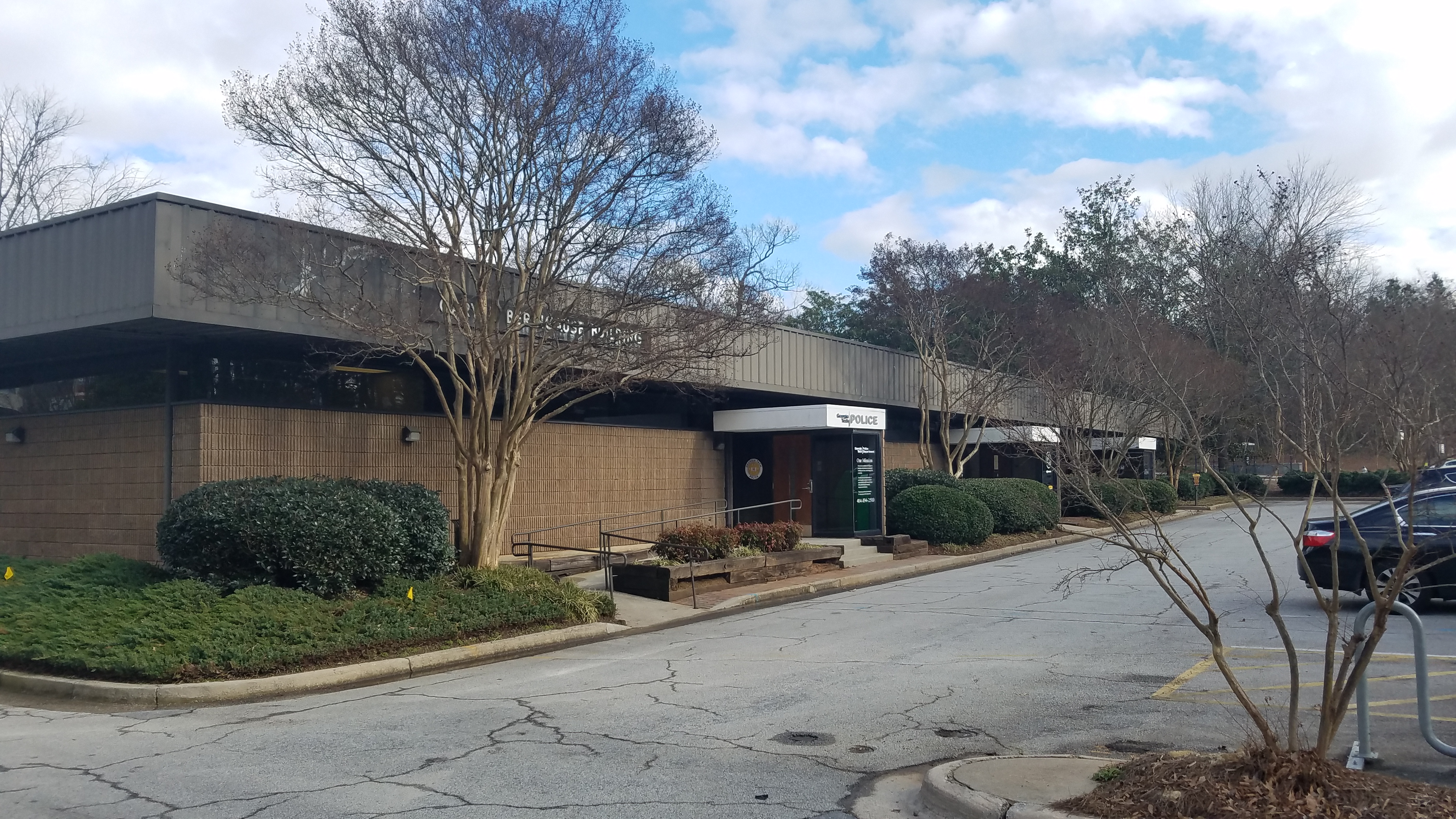
Beringause Building in 2019

In 2016, the Institute announced its Landscape Master Plan, which aimed to reduce stormwater runoff. The project included the construction of the Kendeda Building, a green classroom building built as a part of the EcoCommons. The EcoCommons encompasses 80 acres of resilient plantings that filter stormwater and support biodiversity, with the 8-acre portion near the Kandeda Building featuring more than 600 trees as well as ferns, grasses and perennials. The construction of the EcoCommons also involved the demolition of the Berignause Building, which formerly housed the Georgia Tech Police Department.

== Organization ==
The campus is organized into four main parts: West Campus, East Campus, Central Campus, and Technology Square. West Campus and East Campus are both occupied primarily by student living complexes, while Central Campus is reserved primarily for teaching and research buildings.

=== West Campus ===
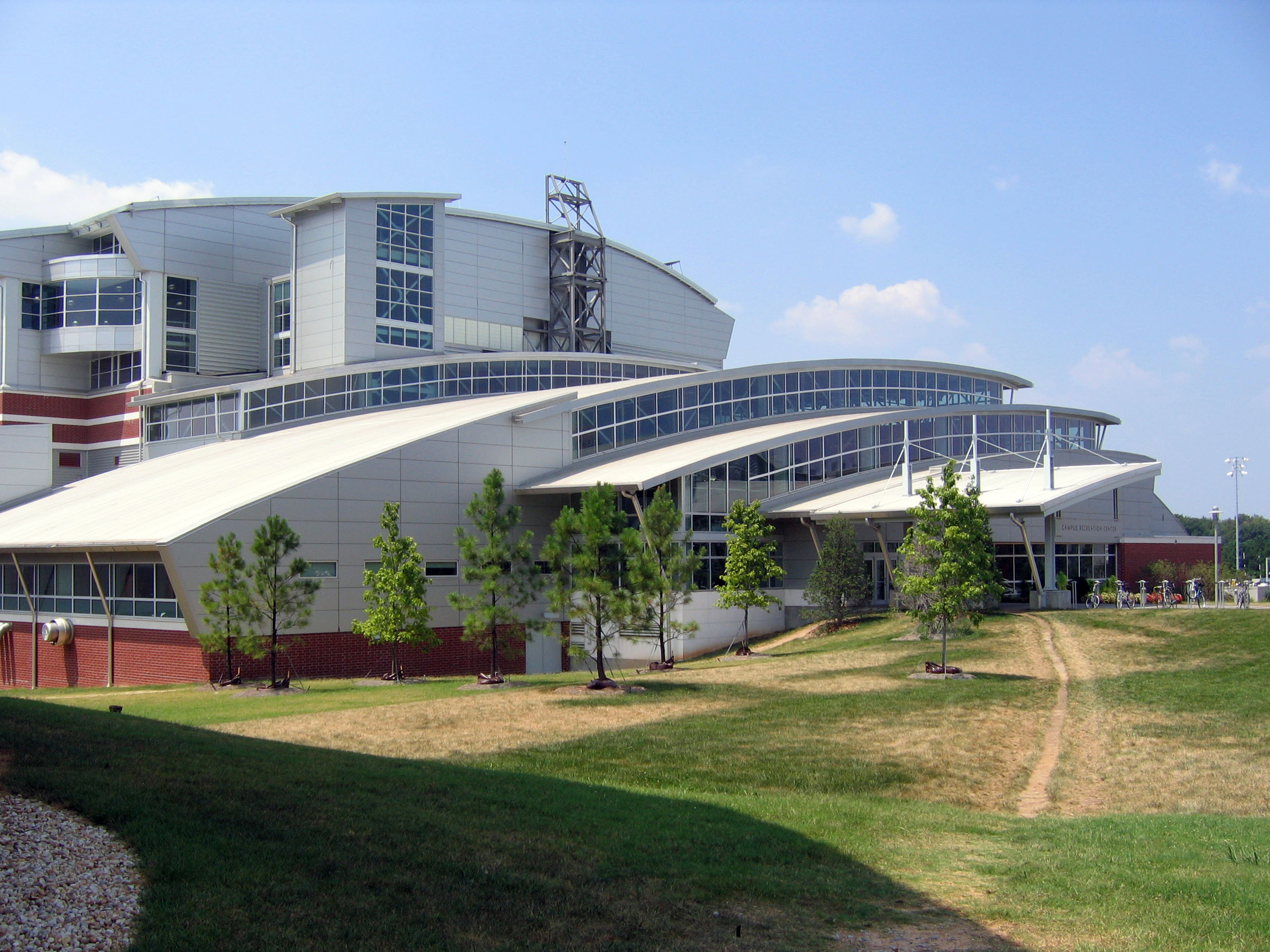
The front of the Georgia Tech Campus Recreation Center

Formerly the location of the Hemphill Avenue neighborhood, Georgia Tech began to expand into this area in 1965. West Campus is occupied primarily by apartments and co-ed undergraduate dormitories. Apartments include Crecine, Center Street, Zbar, Maulding, Nelson-Shell, and Eighth Street Apartments (all of which were built as part of the 1996 Olympic Village), while dorms include Peterson, Freeman, Montag, Fitten, Folk, Caldwell, Armstrong, Hefner, Fulmer, and Woodruff Suites. The Campus Recreation Center (formerly the Student Athletic Complex); a volleyball court; a large, low natural green area known as the Burger Bowl; and a flat artificial green area known as the Stamps Field (formerly SAC Field) are all located on the western side of the campus.

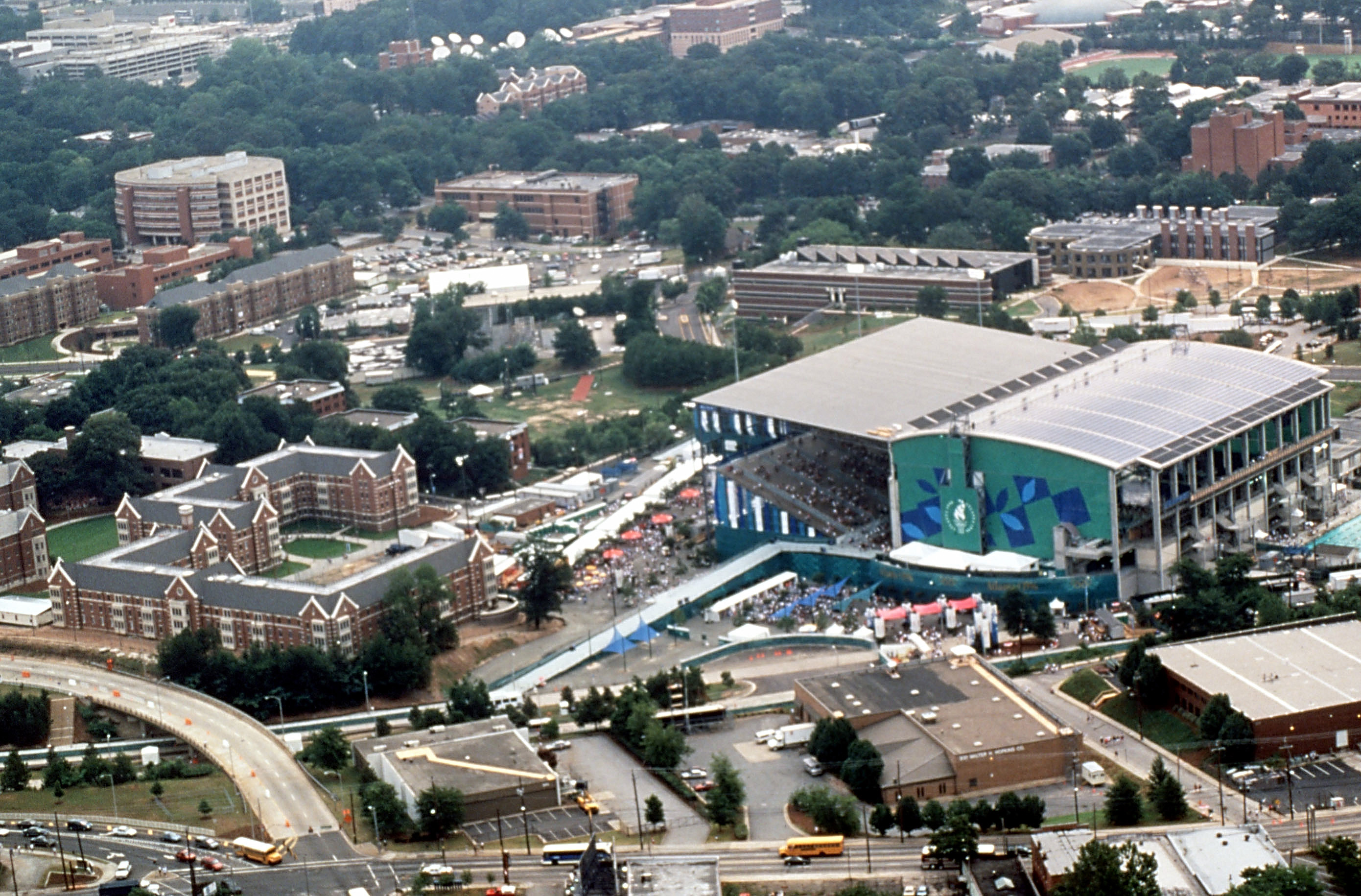
Aerial view of the Olympic Village and Georgia Tech Aquatic Center during the 1996 Olympic Games

West Campus was formerly home to Under the Couch, which relocated to the Student Center in the fall of 2010. Also within walking distance of West Campus are several late-night eateries, primarily on Northside Drive. Engineer's Bookstore, an economical alternative to Georgia Tech's official bookstore, also operated near West Campus until its closure in 2016. West campus was home to a convenience store, West Side Market, which closed in 2017. Due to limited space, all auto travel proceeds via a network of one-way streets which connects West Campus to Hemphill Avenue and Ferst Drive, the main road of the campus. Woodruff Dining Hall, or "Woody's", was the West Campus dining hall before its closure in 2017. It was replaced by West Village, a multipurpose facility featuring dining options, meeting space, School of Music classrooms, and offices to West Campus.

=== East Campus ===
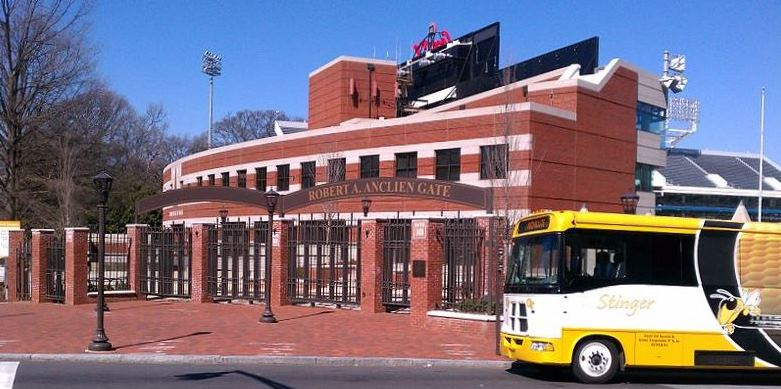
Robert A. Anclien Gate at Bobby Dodd Stadium

East Campus houses all of the fraternities and sororities as well as most of the undergraduate freshman dormitories. East Campus abuts the Downtown Connector, granting residences quick access to Midtown and its businesses (for example, The Varsity) via several bridges over the highway, as well as a tunnel beneath it. Georgia Tech football's home, Bobby Dodd Stadium is located on East Campus, as well as Georgia Tech basketball's home, McCamish Pavilion (formerly Alexander Memorial Coliseum).

Brittain Dining Hall is the main dining hall for East Campus. It is modeled after a medieval church, complete with carved columns and stained glass windows showing symbolic figures. The main road leading from East Campus to Central Campus is a steep ascending incline commonly known as "Freshman Hill" (in reference to the large number of freshman dorms near its foot). On March 8, 2007, the former Georgia State University Village apartments were transferred to Georgia Tech. Renamed North Avenue Apartments by the institute, they began housing students in the fall semester of 2007.

=== Central Campus ===
Central Campus is home to the majority of the academic, research, and administrative buildings. The Central Campus includes, among others: the Howey Physics Building; the Boggs Chemistry Building; the College of Computing Building; the Klaus Advanced Computing Building; the College of Architecture Building; the D. M. Smith Building, which houses the School of Public Policy; and the Ford Environmental Science & Technology Building. In 2005, the School of Modern Languages returned to the Swann Building, a 100-year-old former dormitory that now houses some of the most technology-equipped classrooms on campus. Intermingled with these are a variety of research facilities, such as the Centennial Research Building, the Microelectronics Research Center, the Neely Nuclear Research Center (decommissioned 1999), the Nanotechnology Research Center, and the Petit Biotechnology Building. Notable green spaces include Tech Green, the 8-acre EcoCommons, a community garden, and other quads and courtyards that promote student and environmental health.

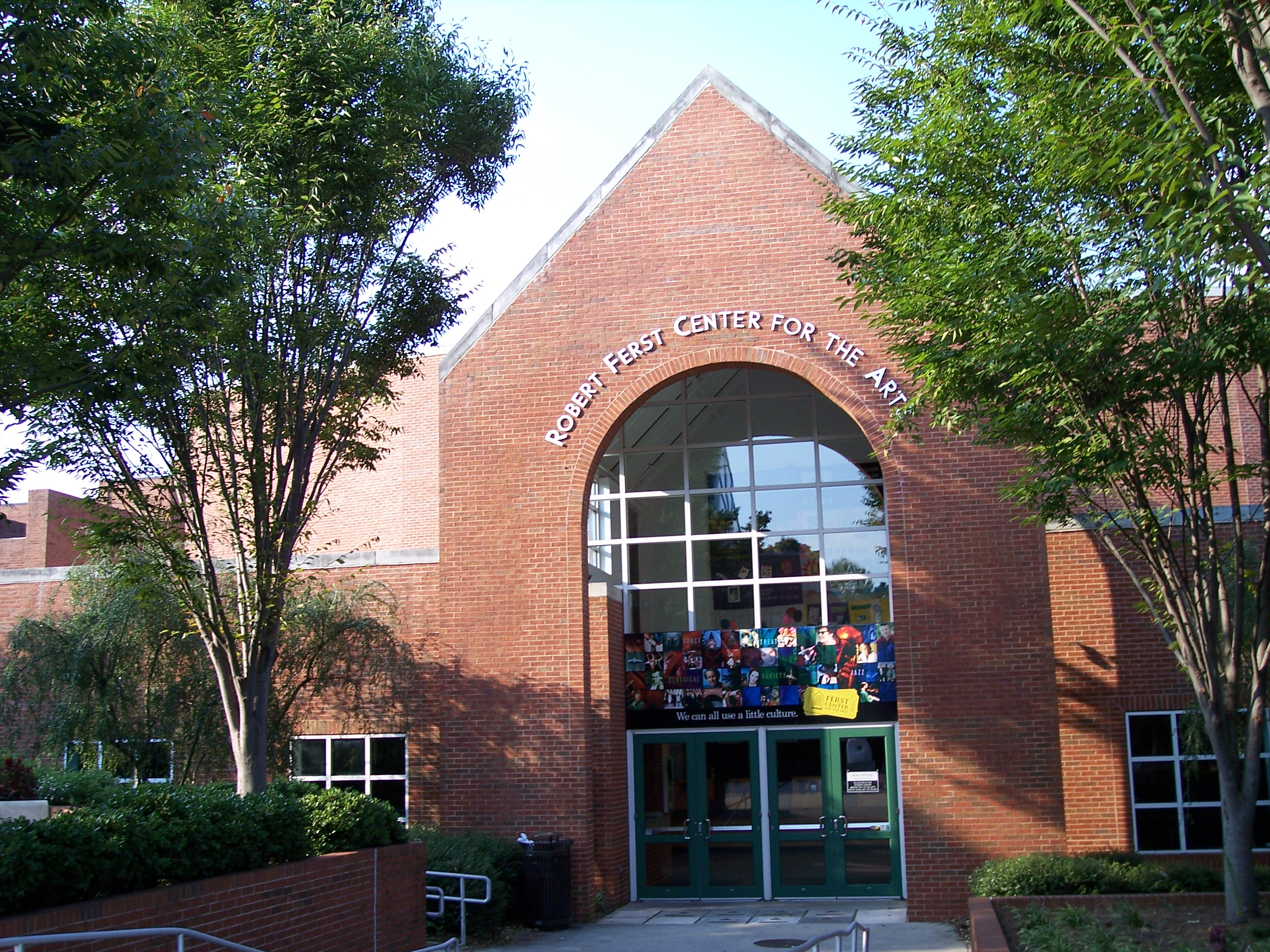
Robert Ferst Center for the Arts

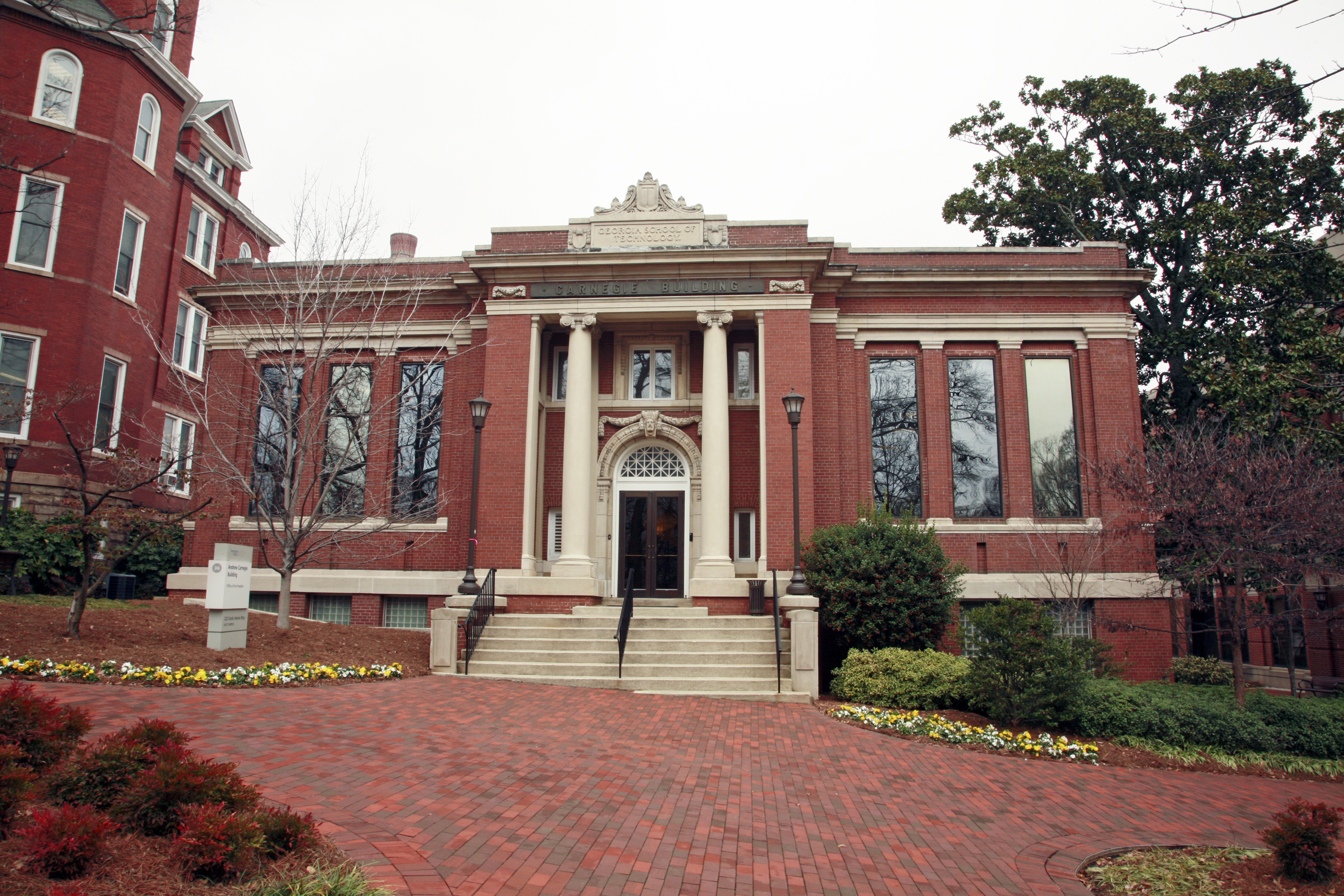
The Carnegie Building, constructed in 1907, is located in the Historic District of Central Campus. It was originally the campus library, and it now houses the President's office.

Tech's administrative buildings, such as Tech Tower, and the Bursar's Office, are also located on the Central Campus, in the Georgia Tech Historic District. The campus library, the Student Center, and the Student Services Building ("Flag Building") are also located on Central Campus. The Student Center provides a variety of recreational and social functions for students including: a computer lab, a game room ("Tech Rec"), the Student Post Office, a music venue, a movie theater, the Food Court, plus meeting rooms for various clubs and organizations. Adjacent to the eastern entrance of the Student Center is the Kessler Campanile (which is referred to by students as "The Shaft"). The former Hightower Textile Engineering building was demolished in 2002 to create Yellow Jacket Park. More greenspace now occupies the area around the Kessler Campanile for a more aesthetically pleasing look, in accordance with the official Campus Master Plan. In August 2011, the G. Wayne Clough Undergraduate Learning Commons opened next to the library and occupies part of the Yellow Jacket Park area.

The Ferst Center for the Arts, located next to the student center, is Georgia Tech's theater and arts center, and adjoins DramaTech, the student run theater. It contains a 1,155-seat auditorium that features a proscenium stage, orchestra pit, and theatrical lighting and sound systems.

=== Technology Square ===
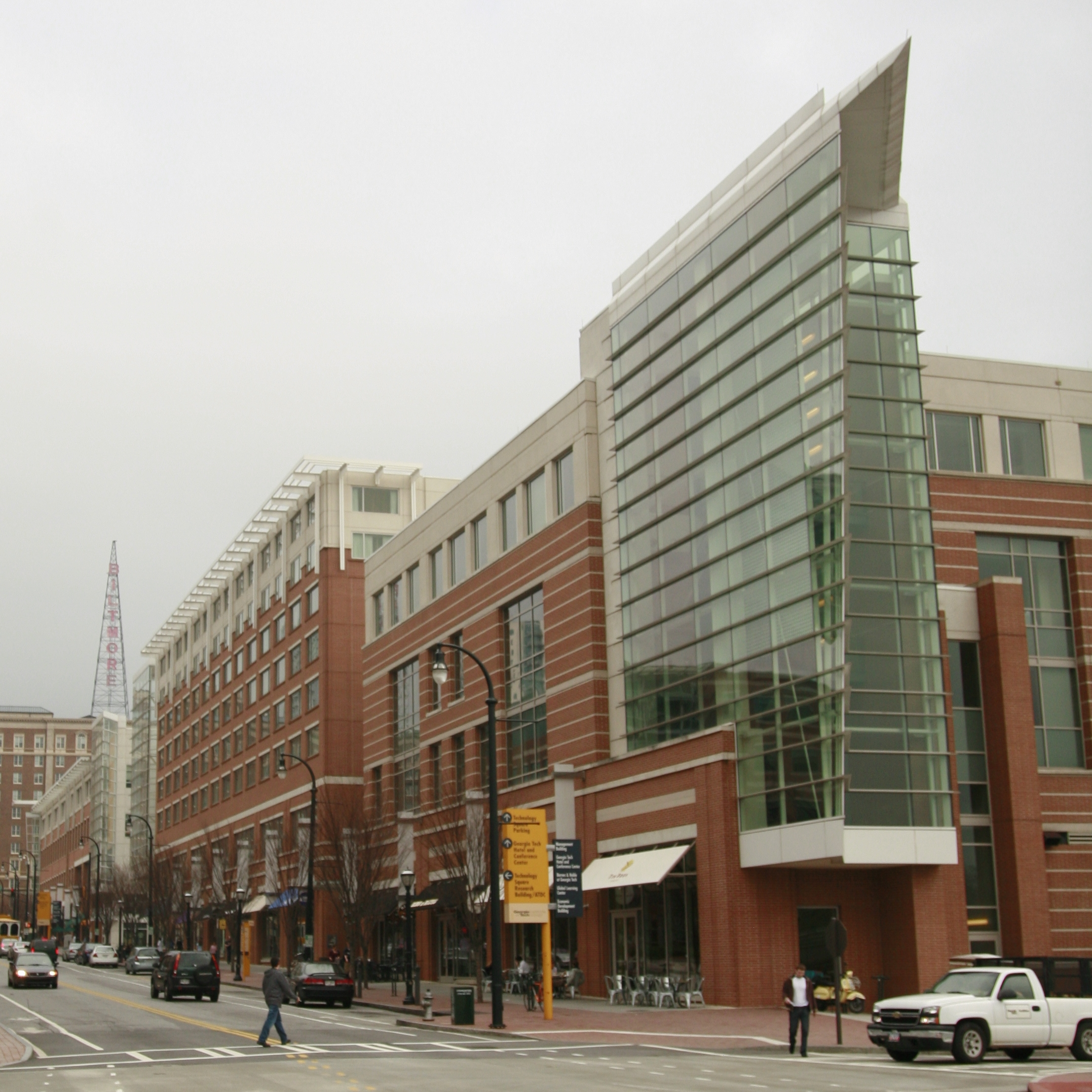
A view of Technology Square

Technology Square, also known as "Tech Square", is located across the Downtown Connector and embedded in the city east of East Campus. Opened in August 2003 at a cost of $179 million, the district was built over run-down neighborhoods and has sparked a revitalization of the entire Midtown area. Connected by the recently renovated Fifth Street Bridge, it is a pedestrian-friendly area comprising Georgia Tech facilities and retail locations. One complex contains the College of Business Building, holding classrooms and office space for the Scheller College of Business, as well as the Georgia Tech Hotel and Conference Center and the Georgia Tech Global Learning Center. Another part of Tech Square, the privately owned Centergy One complex, contains the Technology Square Research Building (TSRB), holding faculty and graduate student offices for the College of Computing and the School of Electrical and Computer Engineering, as well as the GVU Center, a multidisciplinary technology research center. The Advanced Technology Development Center (ATDC) is a science and business incubator, run by the Georgia Institute of Technology, and is also headquartered in Technology Square's Centergy One complex.

Other Georgia Tech-affiliated buildings in the area host the Center for Quality Growth and Regional Development, the Georgia Tech Enterprise Innovation Institute, the Advanced Technology Development Center, VentureLab, and the Georgia Electronic Design Center. Technology Square also hosts a variety of restaurants and businesses, including the headquarters of notable consulting companies like Accenture and also including the official Institute bookstore, a Barnes & Noble bookstore, and a Georgia Tech-themed Waffle House.

== Academic buildings ==
=== Clough Undergraduate Learning Commons ===
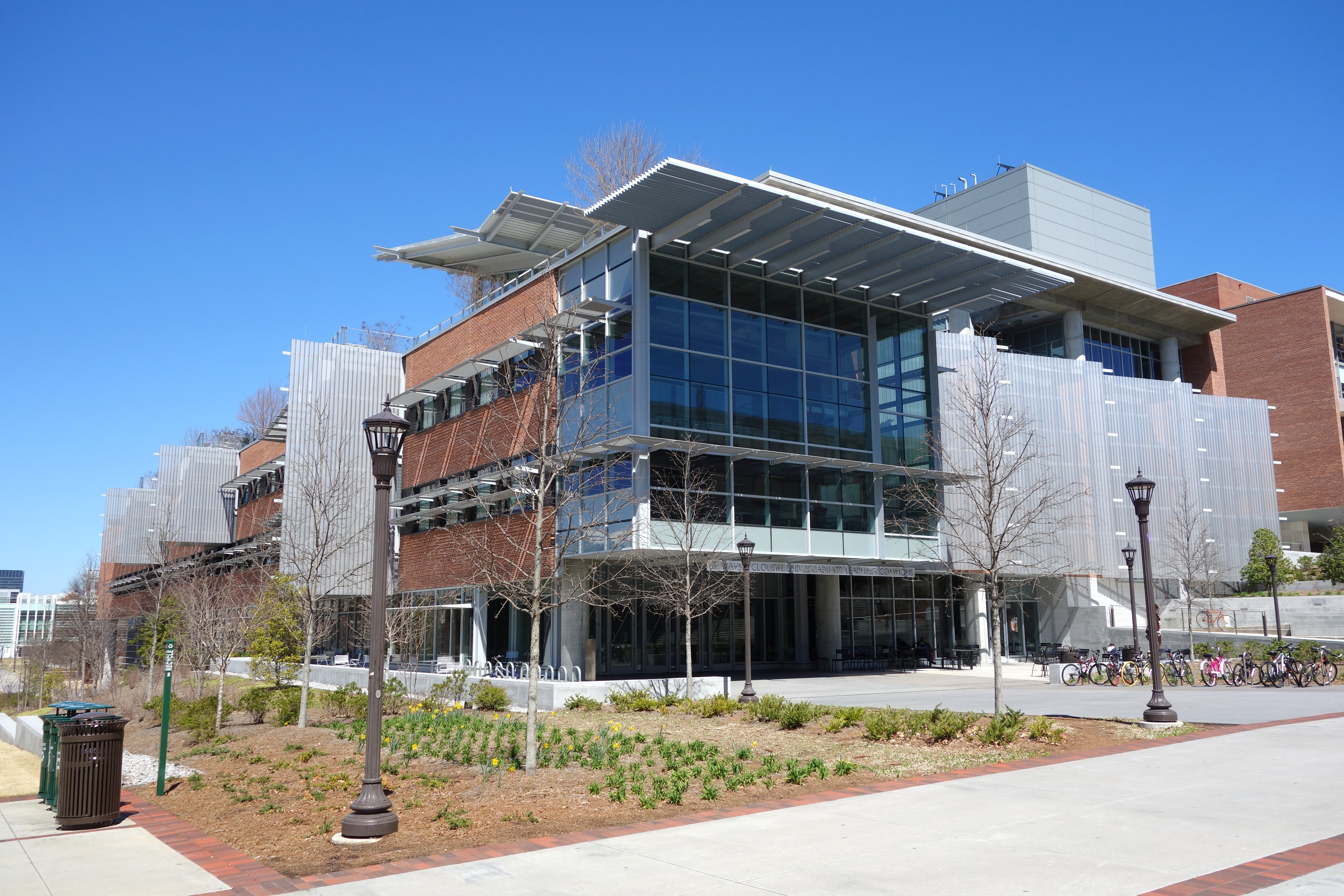
Clough Commons as viewed from Tech Walkway

Opened in Fall 2011, the G. Wayne Clough Undergraduate Learning Commons (Clough Commons, or CULC) is a 220,000 square foot academic building located on Central Campus, adjacent to Tech Green. The building is named after former Georgia Tech President G. Wayne Clough. It is connected to and managed by the Library and contains 41 classrooms and two 300-seat auditoriums.

=== Coon Building ===
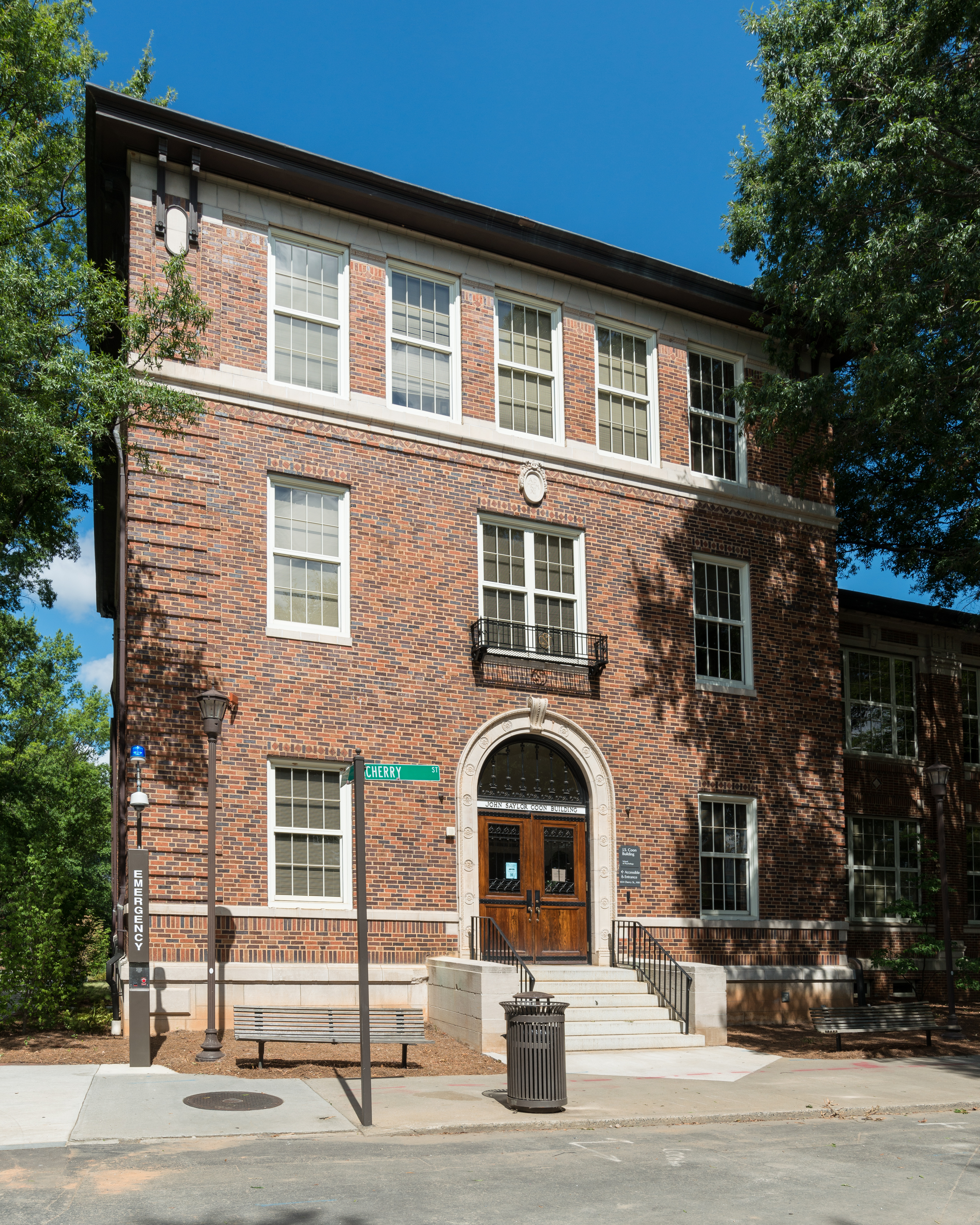
Coon Building

Located on Central Campus as part of Georgia Tech's Historic District, the John Saylor Coon Building was constructed in 1912 and is one of the oldest buildings on campus. Originally called the New Shop Building, the building served as a home for shops and the mechanical engineering department, and continued to be used by the mechanical engineering department until 2001, when it became the home for the School of Psychology. The building gained its current name in 1922, following the retirement of noted professor John Saylor Coon. Between October 2001 and September 2003, the building underwent an extensive $9.1 million renovation that added 11,000 square feet to the facilities. The project received praise for being completed both under budget and on time.

=== Couch Building ===
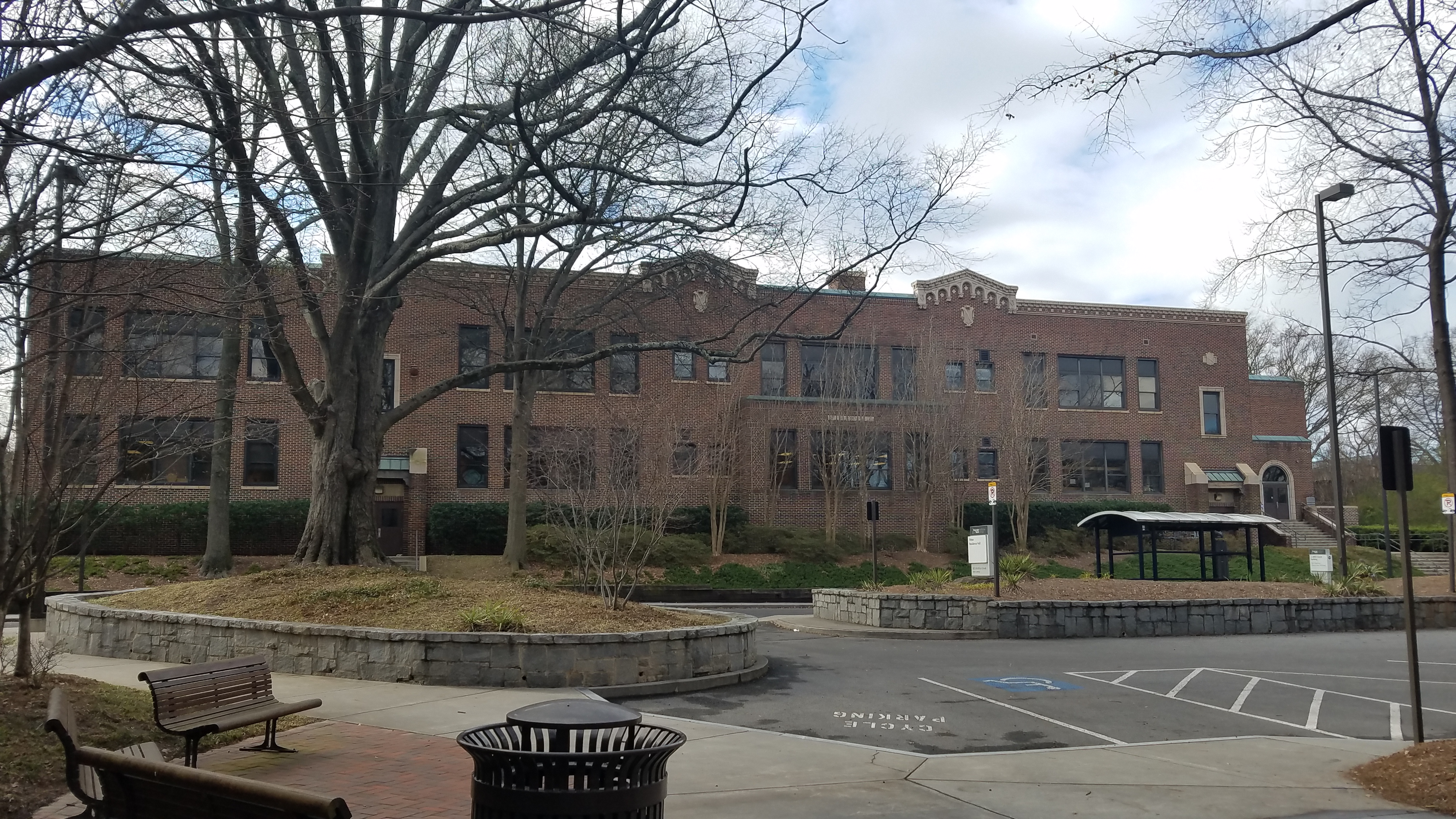
Couch Building

Located on McMillan Street on West Campus, the J. Allen Couch Building serves as the home for the School of Music, a division of the College of Design. Named after Tech alum and prominent Atlanta citizen J. Allen Couch, the building was constructed in 1935 at a cost of $347,000. The building also houses several music practice rooms and a recording studio, and was the former home for Under the Couch before it relocated to the Student Center in 2010.

=== Ford Environmental Science and Technology Building ===
Located on Central Campus, the Ford Environmental Science and Technology Building opened in 2002 and is named after its principal donor, the Ford Motor Company. At 287,000 square feet, it was the largest academic building on campus at the time of its construction and primarily provides classroom space for the School of Chemical and Biomolecular Engineering. The building was constructed for a cost of $58 million.

=== Guggenheim Building ===
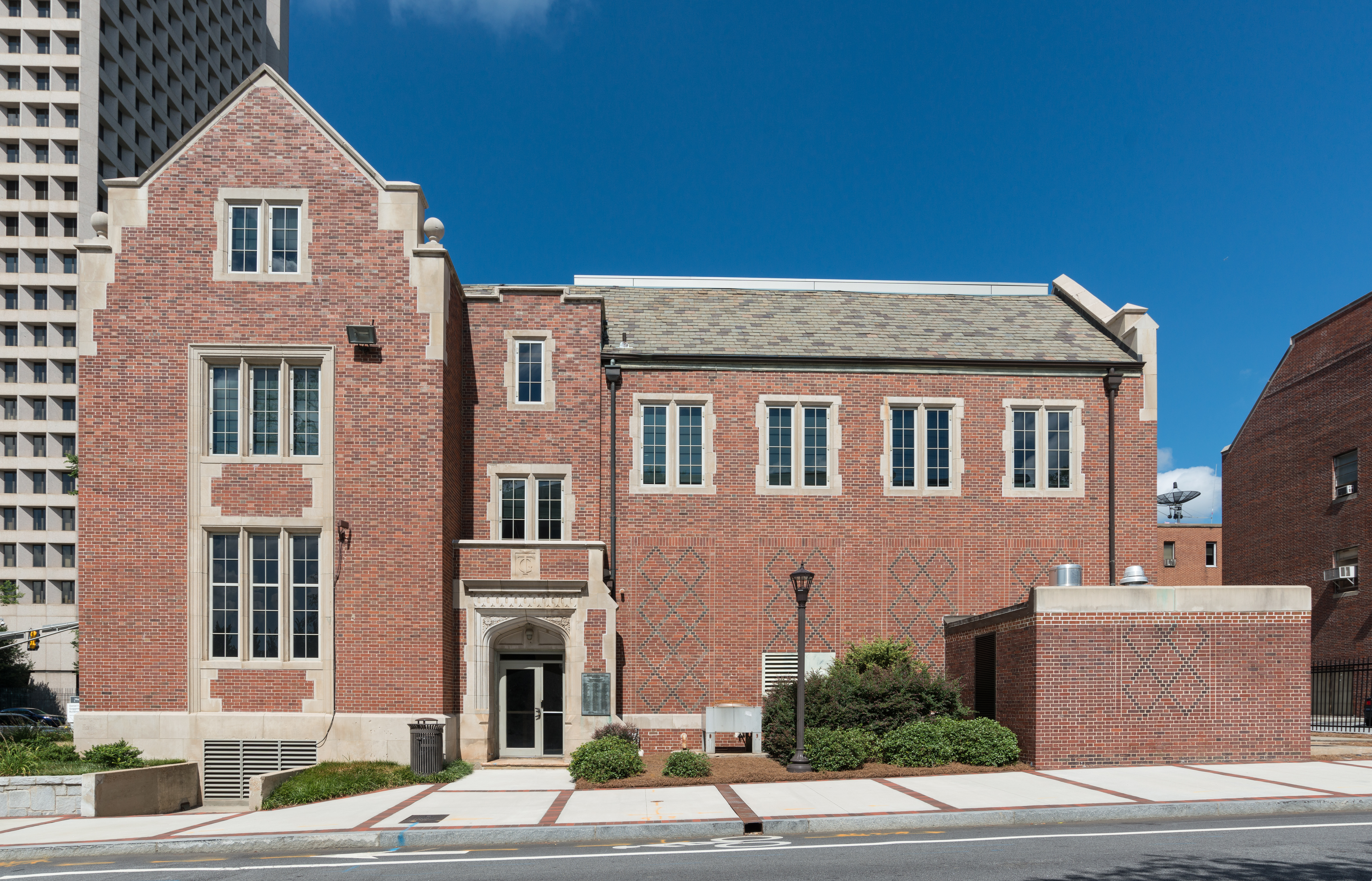
Guggenheim Building viewed from Cherry Street

Located at the corner of Cherry Street and North Avenue on Central Campus, the Daniel Guggenheim Aerospace (formerly Aeronautics) Building was constructed in 1931 at a cost of $91,088 as the first building for what is now the Daniel Guggenheim School of Aerospace Engineering. Both the school and the building were named after the Daniel Guggenheim Fund for the Promotion of Aeronautics, which funded the building's construction. The building is connected to the Montgomery Knight Building, another AE building. The building has 12,900 square-feet of classrooms, offices, and laboratories.

=== Hall Building ===
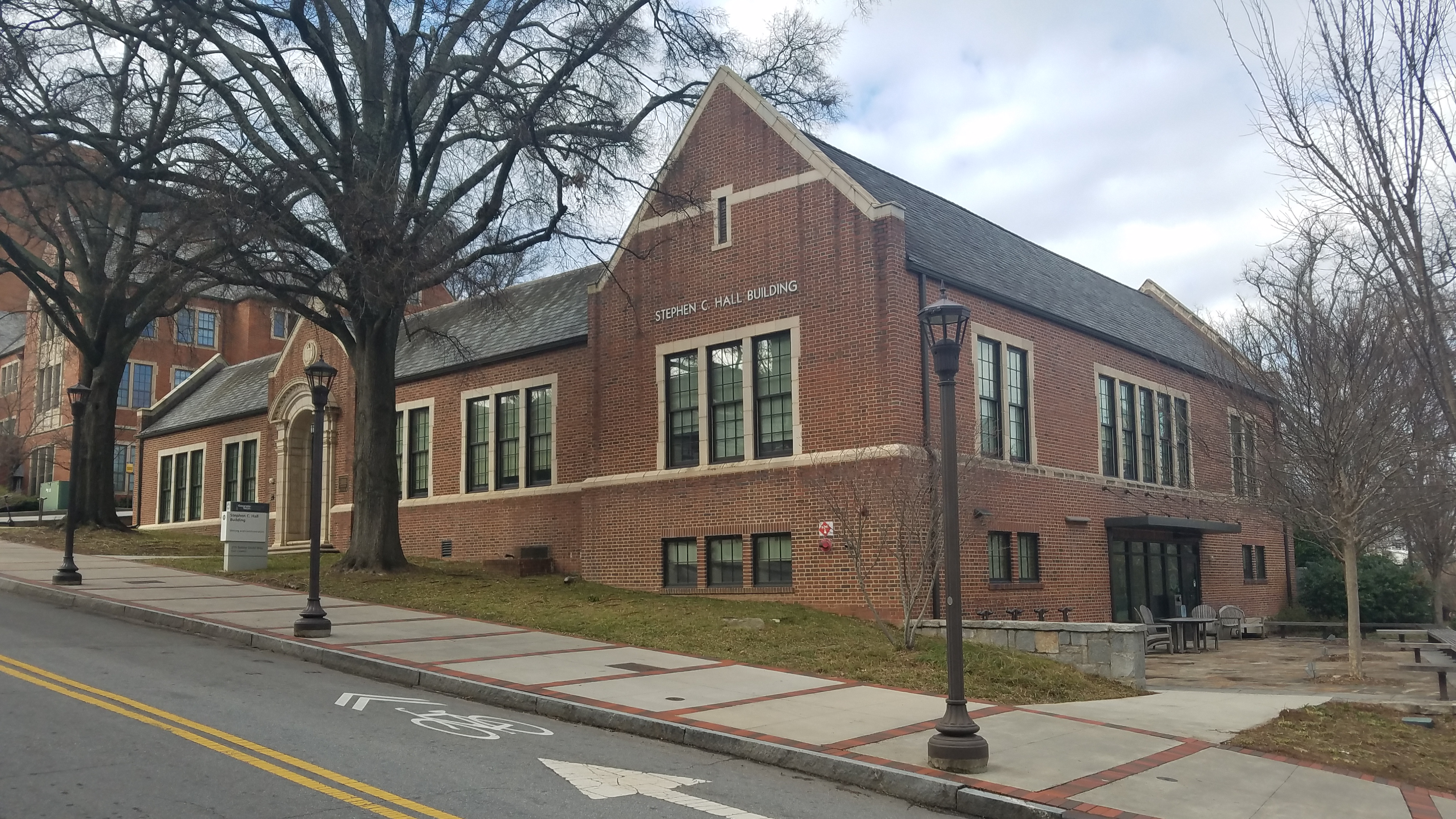
Hall Building

The Stephen C. Hall Building is a small academic building on Central Campus. Built in 1924 as the Navy ROTC Building, the 11,000 square foot building underwent a major renovation in 2012 and now houses the Writing and Communication Program of the Ivan Allen College of Liberal Arts. The building is named for the major donor for the renovation, retired USAF Colonel and Georgia Tech alum Stephen C. Hall. The building is located on Bobby Dodd Way, on the incline known as Freshman Hill.

=== Howey Physics Building ===
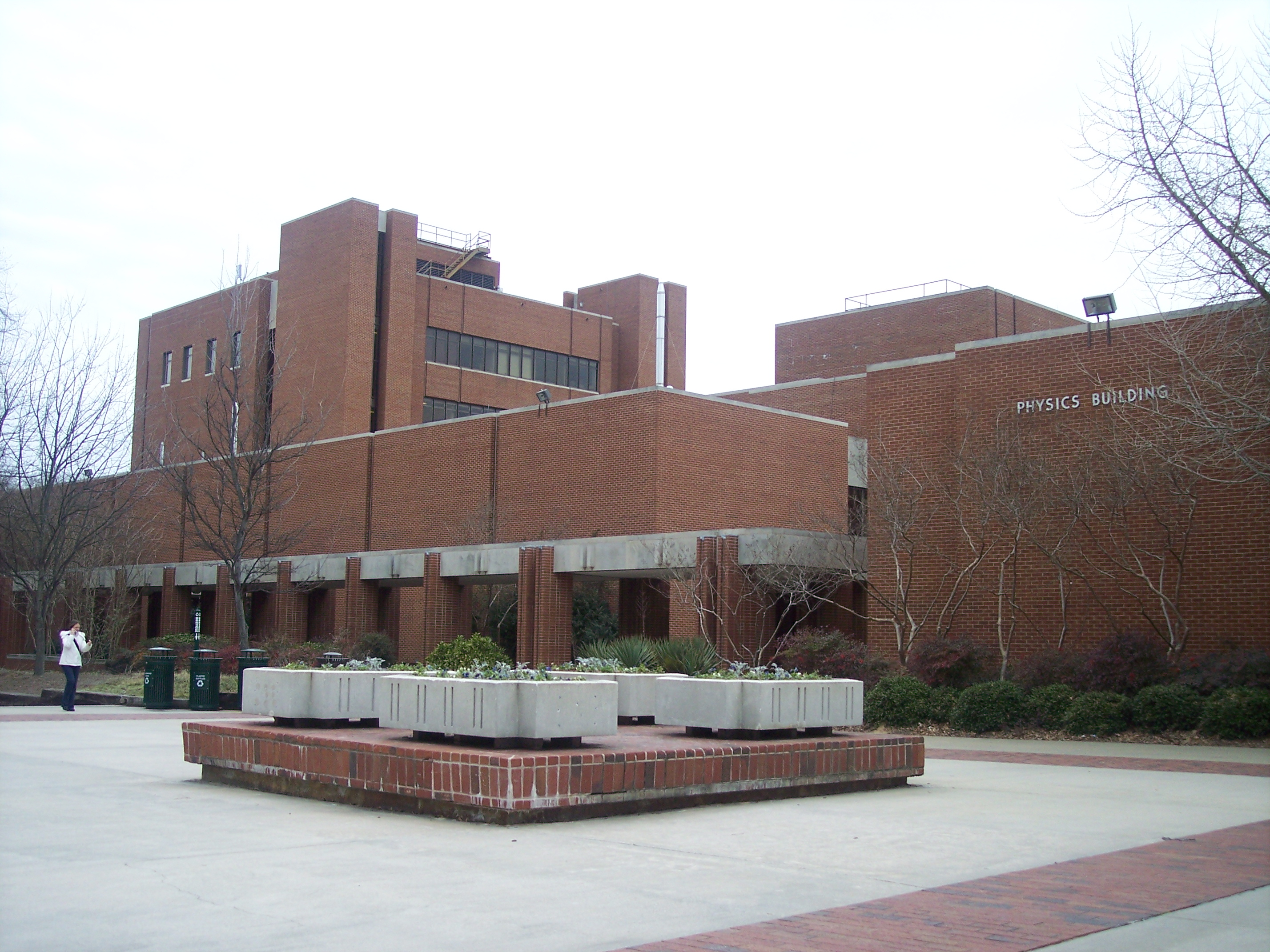
Howey Physics Building

The Joseph H. Howey Physics Building is the main academic building for the School of Physics. Located on Central Campus, the building was opened in 1967 and named after Joseph H. Howey, who had served as director of the school from 1935 to 1963. The building includes 26,000 square feet of instructional space and 156,000 square feet of research laboratory space.

=== Kandeda Building for Innovative Sustainable Design ===
Opened in 2019, the Kandeda Building demonstrates regenerative design, construction, and operation techniques. Its Living Building Challenge certification goes beyond LEED requirements.

=== Klaus Advanced Computing Building ===
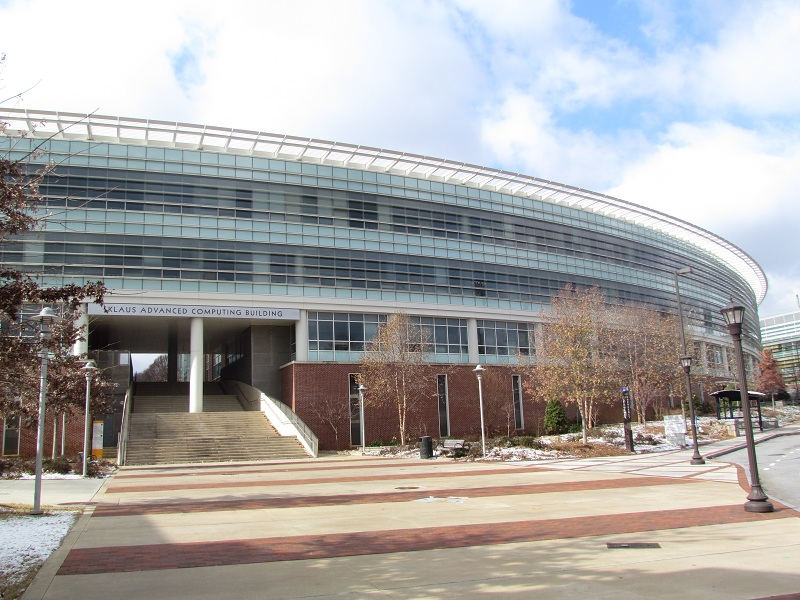
Klaus Advanced Computing Building

Officially opened on October 26, 2006, the Christopher W. Klaus Advanced Computing Building is a 414,000 square foot academic building located on Central Campus. Named after Georgia Tech alum Chris Klaus, whose $15 million donation financed the building's construction, the building houses the School of Computer Science, the School of Computational Science and Engineering, and multiple classrooms and laboratories for other departments. The building includes 70 research laboratories, six instructional labs, and five large classrooms, in addition to a 200-seat auditorium.

=== Library ===
The Georgia Tech Library is the academic library of the Georgia Institute of Technology. Located on Central Campus, the library consists of two connected main buildings: the S. Price Gilbert Memorial Library, which opened in 1953, and Crosland Tower, which opened in 1969 as the library's graduate addition.

=== Mason Building ===
Located on Central Campus, the Jesse W. Mason Building is the main academic building for the School of Civil and Environmental Engineering. The 90,000 square foot facility was originally constructed in 1969 and named after Jesse W. Mason, a former dean of the College of Engineering. Between 2012 and 2013 the building underwent a $12.5 million renovation project that included the removal of asbestos, HVAC updates, and a new student commons area, among other improvements.

=== Swann Building ===
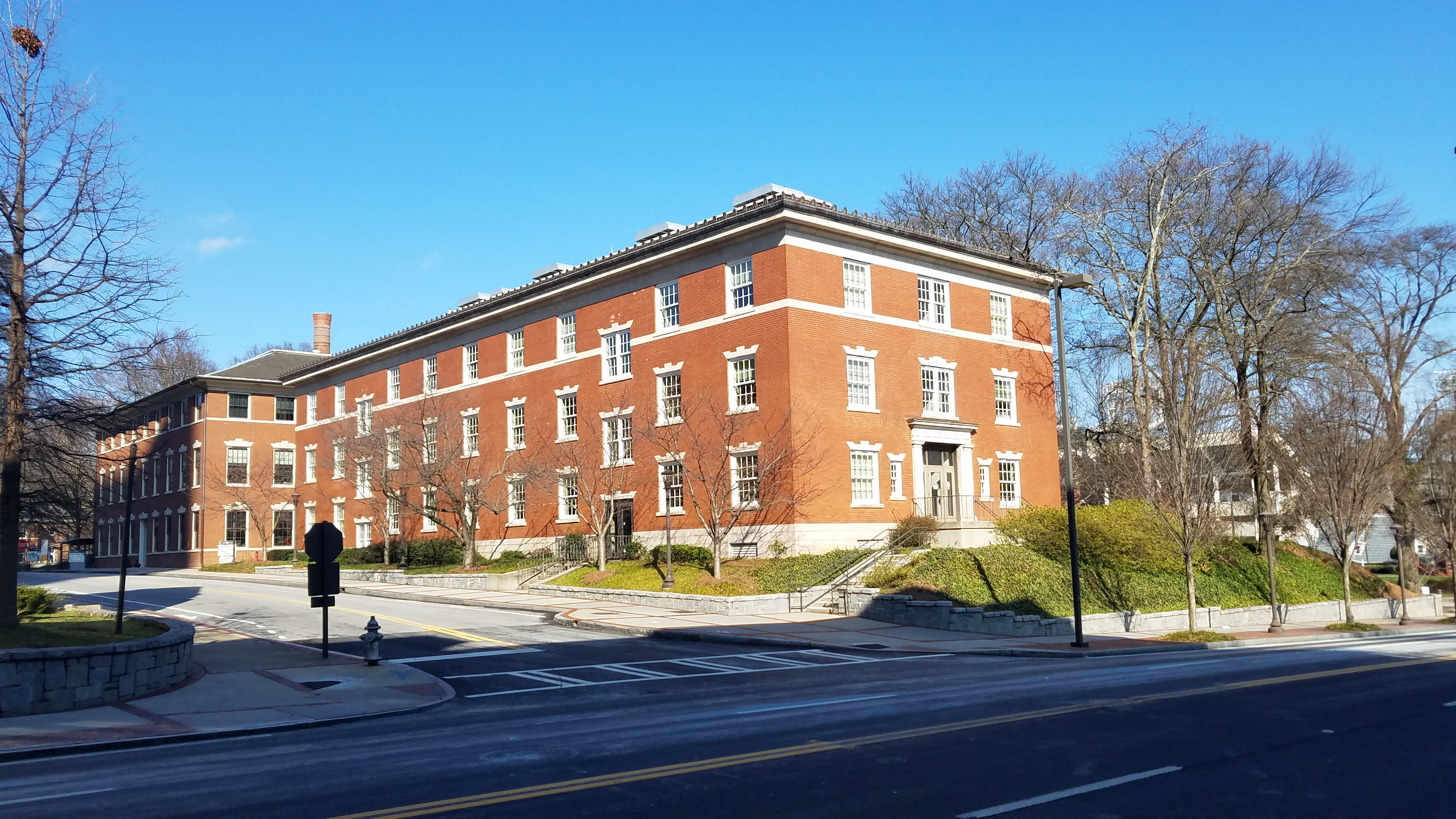
Swann Building as seen from North Avenue

The Janie Austell Swann Building is an academic building on Central Campus and a part of Georgia Tech's Historic District. The building was dedicated in 1901 following a donation by James Swann and named in memory of his deceased wife. While initially constructed as a dormitory, the building now houses the School of Modern Languages. The building has experienced renovations in 1964 and 2006.

=== Van Leer Building ===
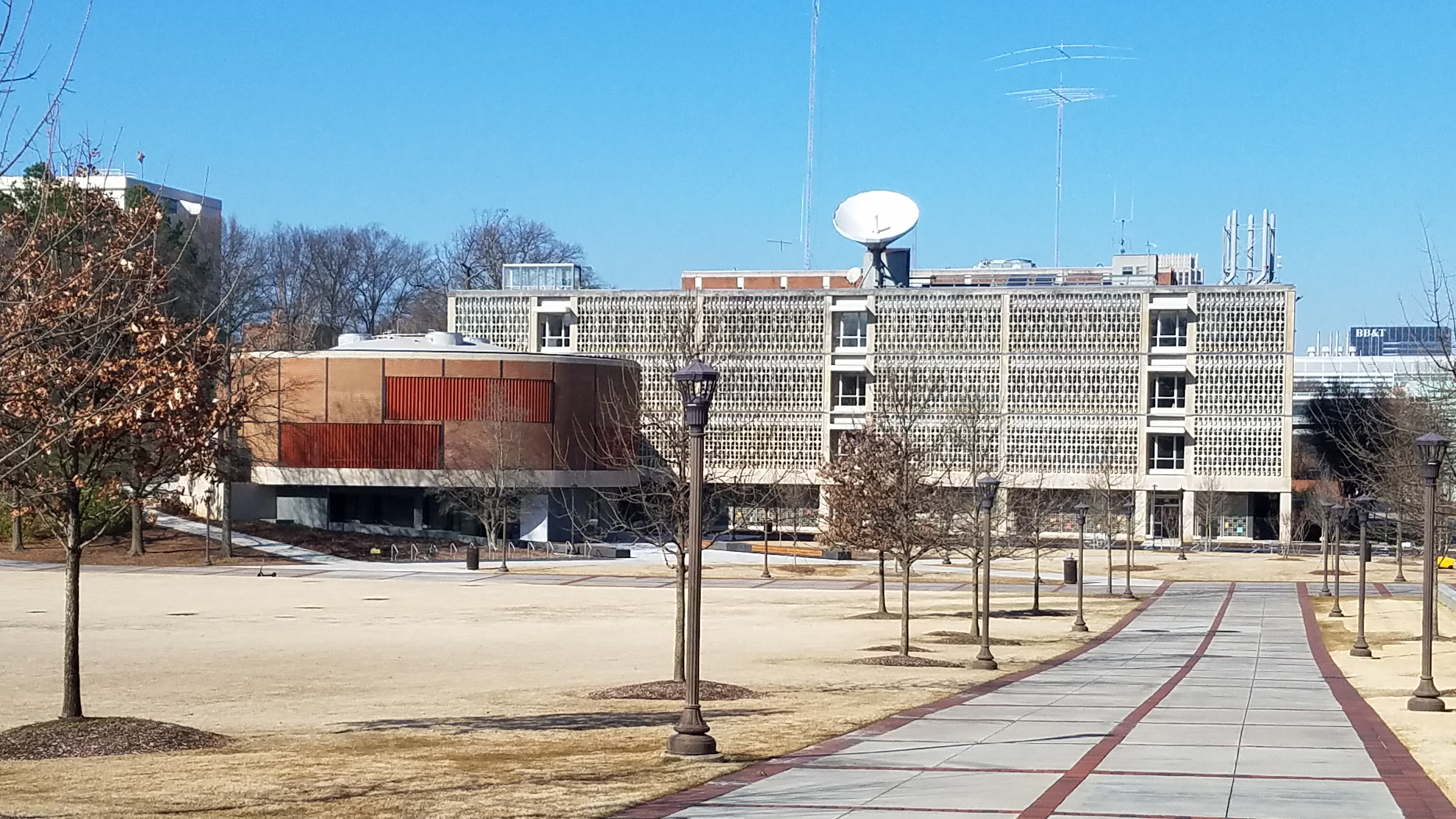
Van Leer Building's front façade

The Blake R. Van Leer Electrical and Computer Engineering Building houses the main offices of the School of Electrical and Computer Engineering, as well as multiple ECE classrooms and research labs. Completed in 1962, it was originally known as the New Electrical Engineering Building and is currently named for Georgia Tech's fifth president, Blake Ragsdale Van Leer. Since 1962, the building has also housed the Georgia Tech Amateur Radio Club, with multiple antennas located on the roof of the building. The building is located on Central Campus, on the north edge of Tech Green.

=== Whitaker Building ===
Located on Central Campus, the U.A. Whitaker Building serves as the main home for the Wallace H. Coulter Department of Biomedical Engineering. Construction of the 99,822 square foot building began in 2002 and cost $23 million. The building is named for noted philanthropist Uncas A. Whitaker.

== Research buildings ==
=== Marcus Nanotechnology Building ===
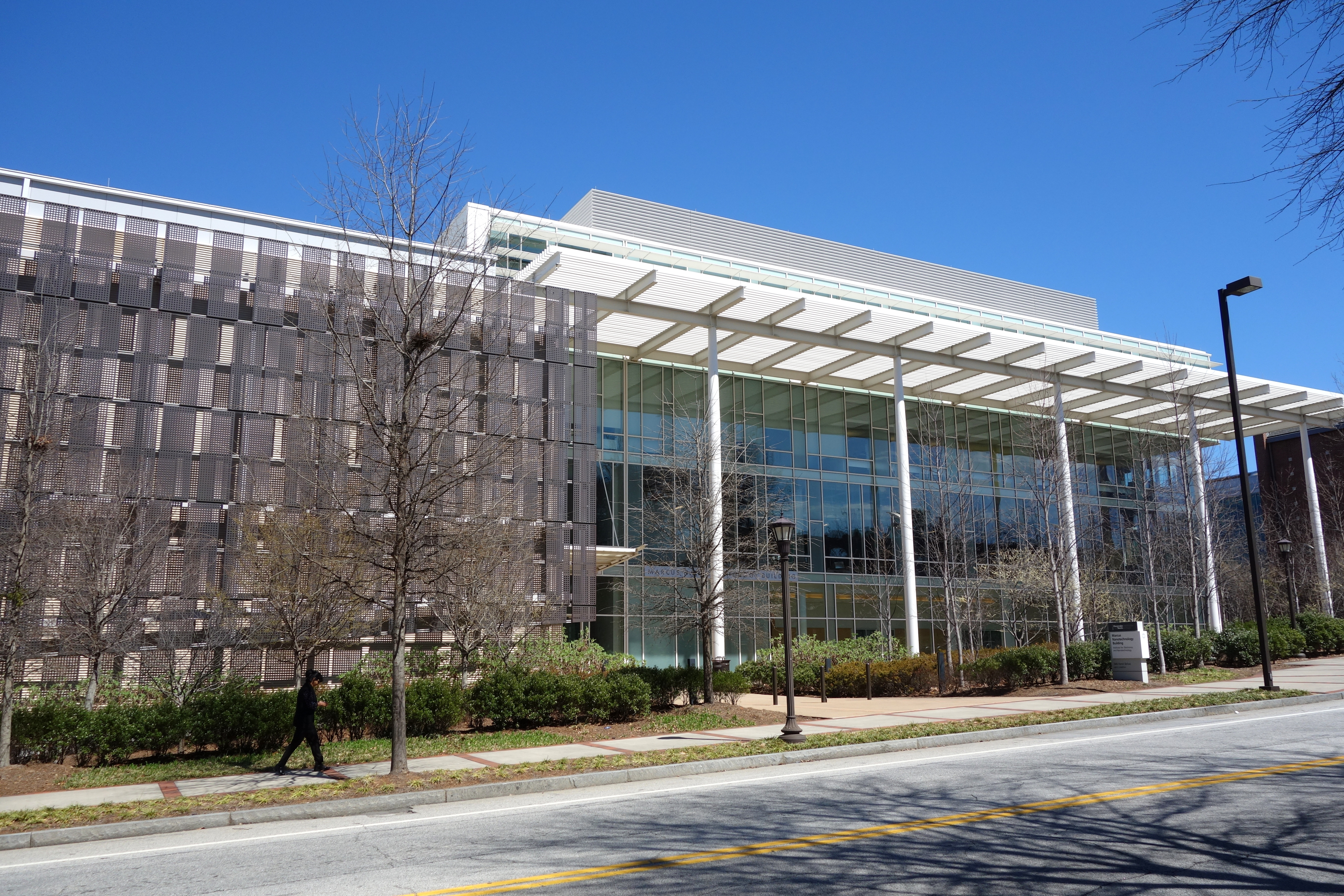
Marcus Nanotechnology Building

Located on Central Campus, the Marcus Nanotechnology Building is a research facility and headquarters for the Institute of Electronics and Nanotechnology (IEN). Originally opened in 2009 as the Marcus Nanotechnology Research Center, the building adopted its current name in 2013. Of note, the building houses the largest cleanroom laboratory dedicated to the fabrication, characterization, and assembly of biomedical and semiconductor devices in the Southeast United States.

== Residence halls ==
Housing at Georgia Tech consists of both apartments and residence halls, with residence halls primarily serving first-year students (a system known as Freshman Experience) and apartments generally serving upperclassmen. With the exception of North Avenue Apartments, all apartments are located on west campus, whereas freshman traditional residence halls can be found on both east and west campus.

=== Residence Halls ===
==== Armstrong Hall ====
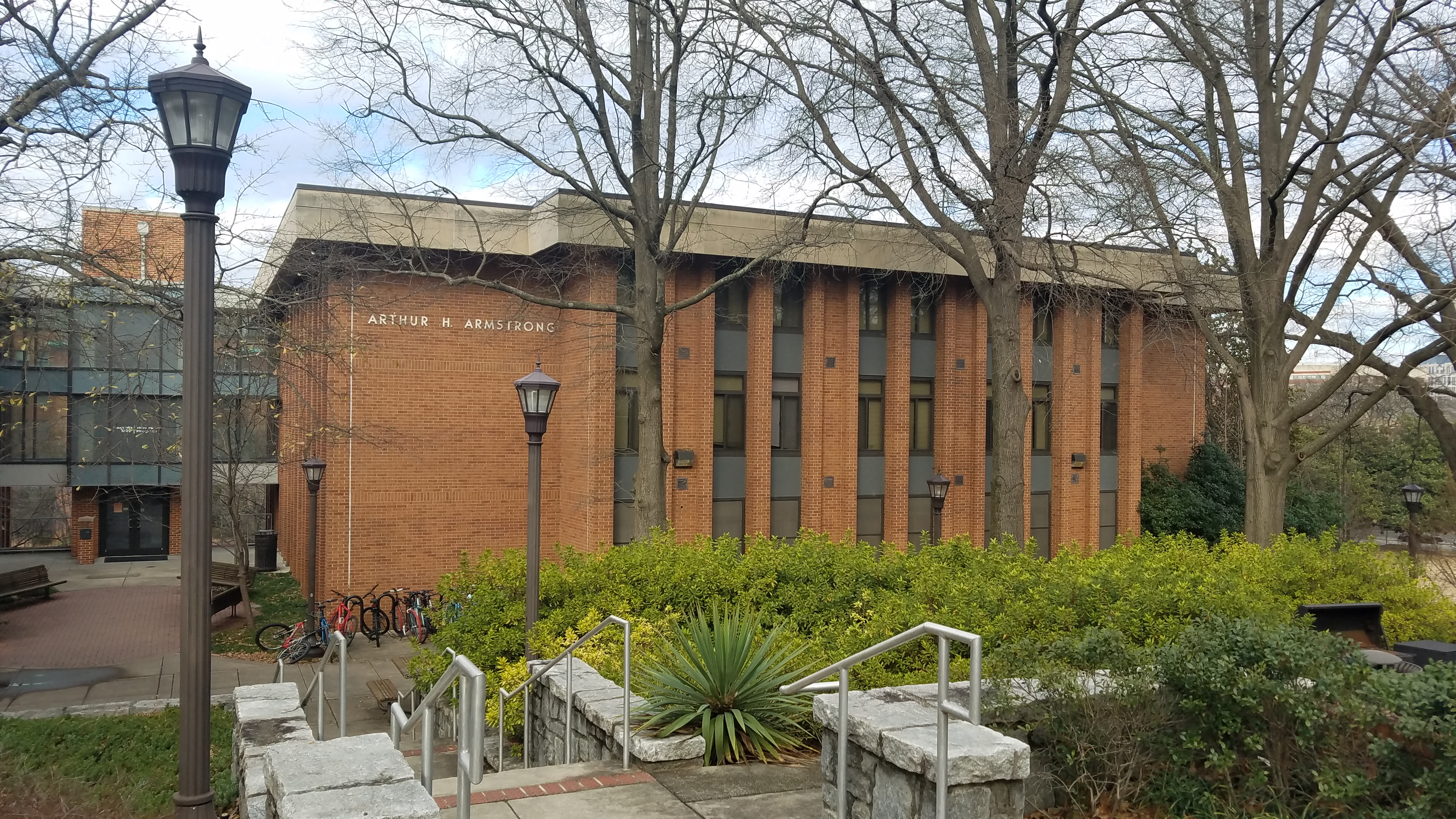
Armstrong Hall

Armstrong Residence Hall is a traditional co-ed residence hall, currently housing first-year students, dedicated in name to Arthur H. Armstrong and is the sibling dorm of Hefner. It is located on West Campus, near West Village. Armstrong Hall was built in 1969 and last renovated in 2006. It consists of four floors, with shared bathrooms on each floor, and as of 2026 has a bed count of 114. The building includes an elevator and kitchens located on floors 1 and 2.

==== Brown Hall ====
Brown Residence Hall is a traditional co-ed residence hall, currently housing first-year students, dedicated in name of Julis L. Brown. It was built in 1925 and last renovated in 1993. Brown is located on the northeast corner of North Avenue and Techwood Drive. Brown Hall is the oldest active residence hall on campus, and is also the smallest of the institute's residence halls. It consists of four floors, with only three housing residents, and as of 2026 has a bed count of 91. The building does not include an elevator and the laundry room is located in nearby Brittain hall.

==== Caldwell Hall ====
Caldwell Residence Hall is a traditional co-ed residence hall, currently housing first-year students. Caldwell is a co-ed by floor and is the sibling dorm of Folk. The building is named after Hugh H. Caldwell, a Registrar for Georgia Tech in the early 1920s and 1930s. Caldwell originally cost $478,000 to construct and was designed by the architects Bull & Kenney. It was built in 1969 and last renovated in 2002, and as of 2026 it has a bed count of 158. The building does not include an elevator and is located close to West Village Dining Hall.

In Fall 2006, Caldwell housed the infamous "triples," which was a project that put three residents into a two-man room. Certain pieces of furniture were not provided to the third resident as to accommodate a third bed. When spaces became available in other parts of campus, the third resident was moved elsewhere.

==== Cloudman Hall ====
Cloudman Hall

Cloudman Residence Hall is a traditional co-ed residence hall, currently housing first-year students. Cloudman Hall is dedicated to Josiah Cloudman. Cloudman was built in 1931 and last renovated in 1995. Cloudman originally cost $128,000 to construct and was designed by architects Bush-Brown, Gailey & Associates. Cloudman is set to be renovated again in the coming decade. As of 2026, it has a bed count of 115. The building has no elevator.

It is by the northern wing of Brittain Dining Hall, while Harris Hall is the southern wing.

==== Peterson Hall ====
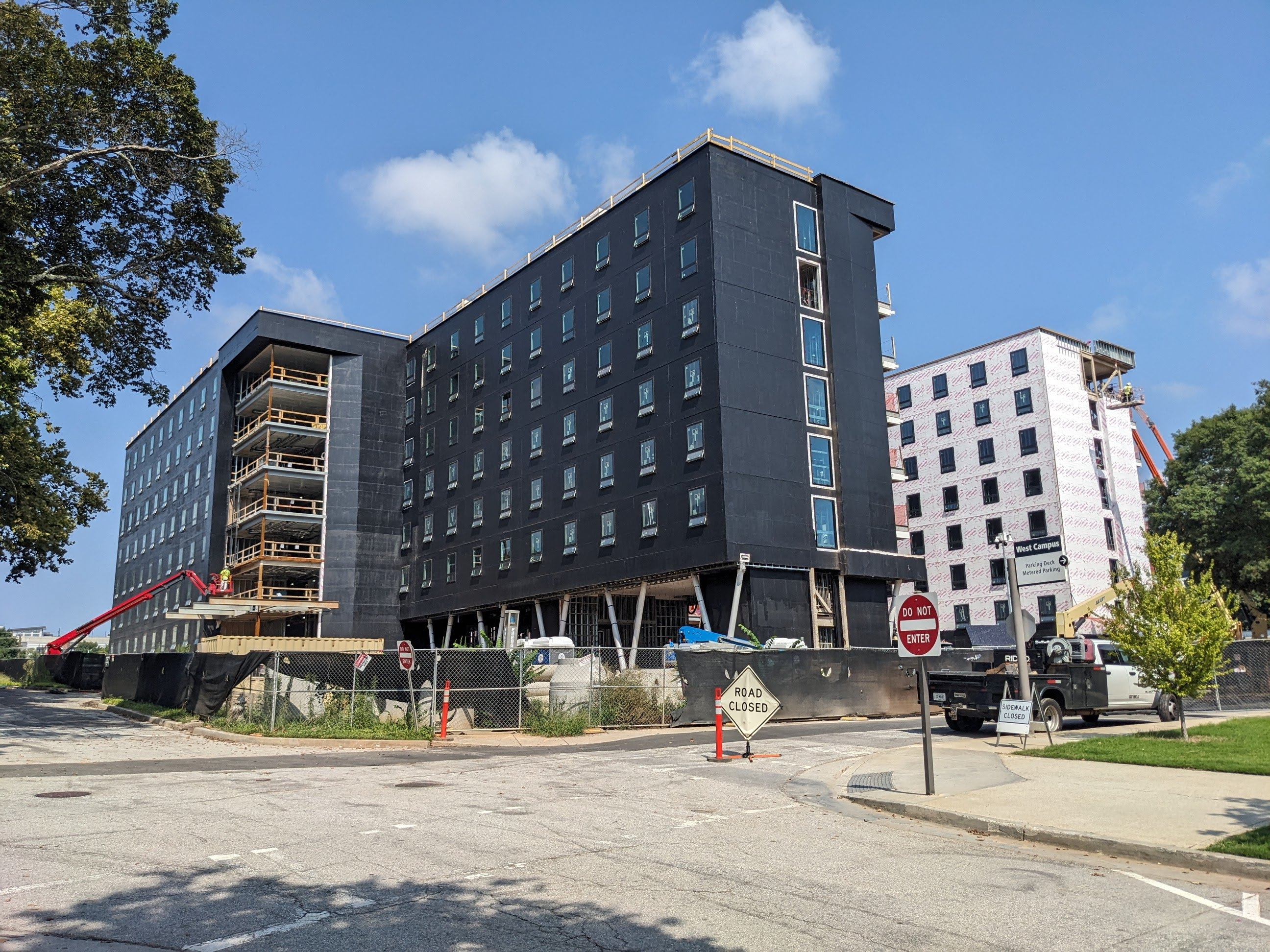
Peterson Residence Hall in 2025

Bud and Val Peterson Residence Hall is a traditional co-ed residence hall. Currently Georgia Tech's newest dorm, Peterson was completed right before Fall 2026 and is the first on-campus housing built since 2005. It has a bed count of 860. The residence hall is split into 2 separate buildings with connections on the 1st and 3rd floor. Peterson is named after former Georgia Tech President Bud Peterson and his wife, Val. Floors are co-ed by wing, females will be on one half and males on the other. This dorm is the first dorm with co-ed bathrooms; however, showers and toilet stalls contain floor-to-ceiling privacy. It is located on West Campus, between the Eighth Street Apartments and Woodruff Dorms. It includes a gym and a laundry room as well as a market.

==== Field Hall ====
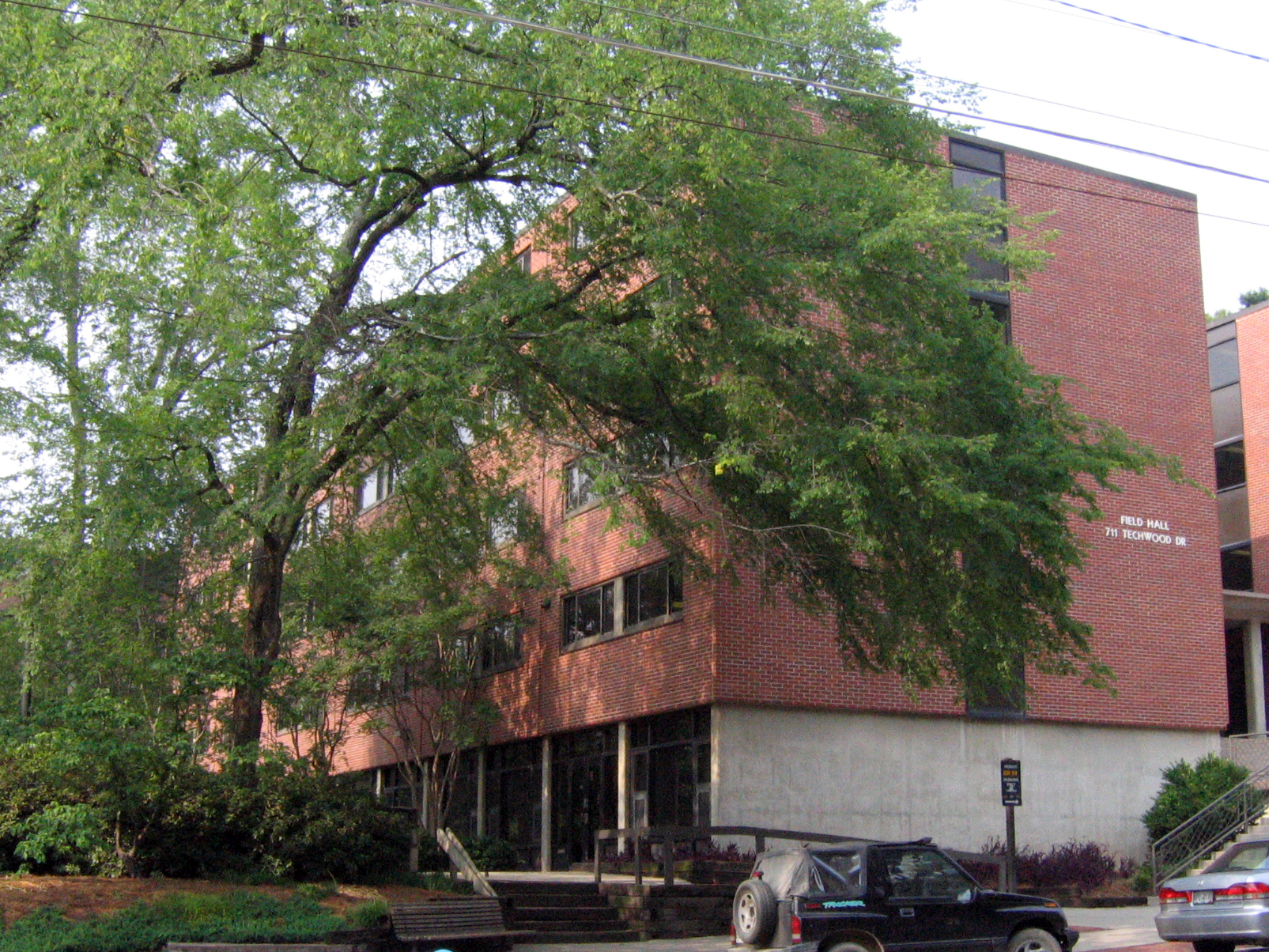
Field Hall

Field Residence Hall is a co-ed residence hall, currently housing first-year students. Field was built in 1961 and last renovated in 2005. It is located on East Campus and as of 2019 it has a bed count of 126. The dorm rooms are either 2-person traditional or are in a quad-style where inside one dorm room, there is a door to another room. The laundry is located in the adjacent Hopkins hall and there is no elevator.

==== Fitten Hall ====
Fitten Residence Hall is a traditional co-ed residence hall, currently housing first-year students. It is named in honor of Louise M. Fitten. Fitten was built in 1972 and last renovated in 2012. As of 2026, it has a bed count of 128. There is an elevator and a small gym in the building.

Fitten is co-ed by floor and part of the Fitten, Freeman, and Montag group often abbreviated "FFM." The West Commons laundry room is located in Fitten and is the laundry room for Caldwell, Folk, Fitten, Freeman, Montag, Armstrong and Hefner.

Fitten originally cost $729,000 to construct and was designed by Bradbury & Associates.

==== Folk Hall ====
Folk Residence Hall is a traditional co-ed residence hall, currently housing first-year students. Folk originally cost $478,000 to construct and was designed by the architects Bull & Kenney. As of 2026, it has a bed count of 156.

Folk is co-ed by floor. It is the sibling dorm of Caldwell, both being constructed mirror images of one another in 1969. It was last renovated in 2005.

The dorm is named after Edwin H. Folk, an esteemed English professor at Georgia Tech. He taught from 1924 to 1959 and became one of the most popular professors on campus during his tenure.

In fall 1993, Folk was converted to an all-female dorm. However, it is now again a co-ed residence hall.

In Fall 2006, Folk housed the infamous "triples", which was a project that put three residents into a two-man room. Certain pieces of furniture were not provided to the third resident as to accommodate a third bed. When spaces became available in other parts of campus, the third resident was moved elsewhere.

==== Freeman Hall ====
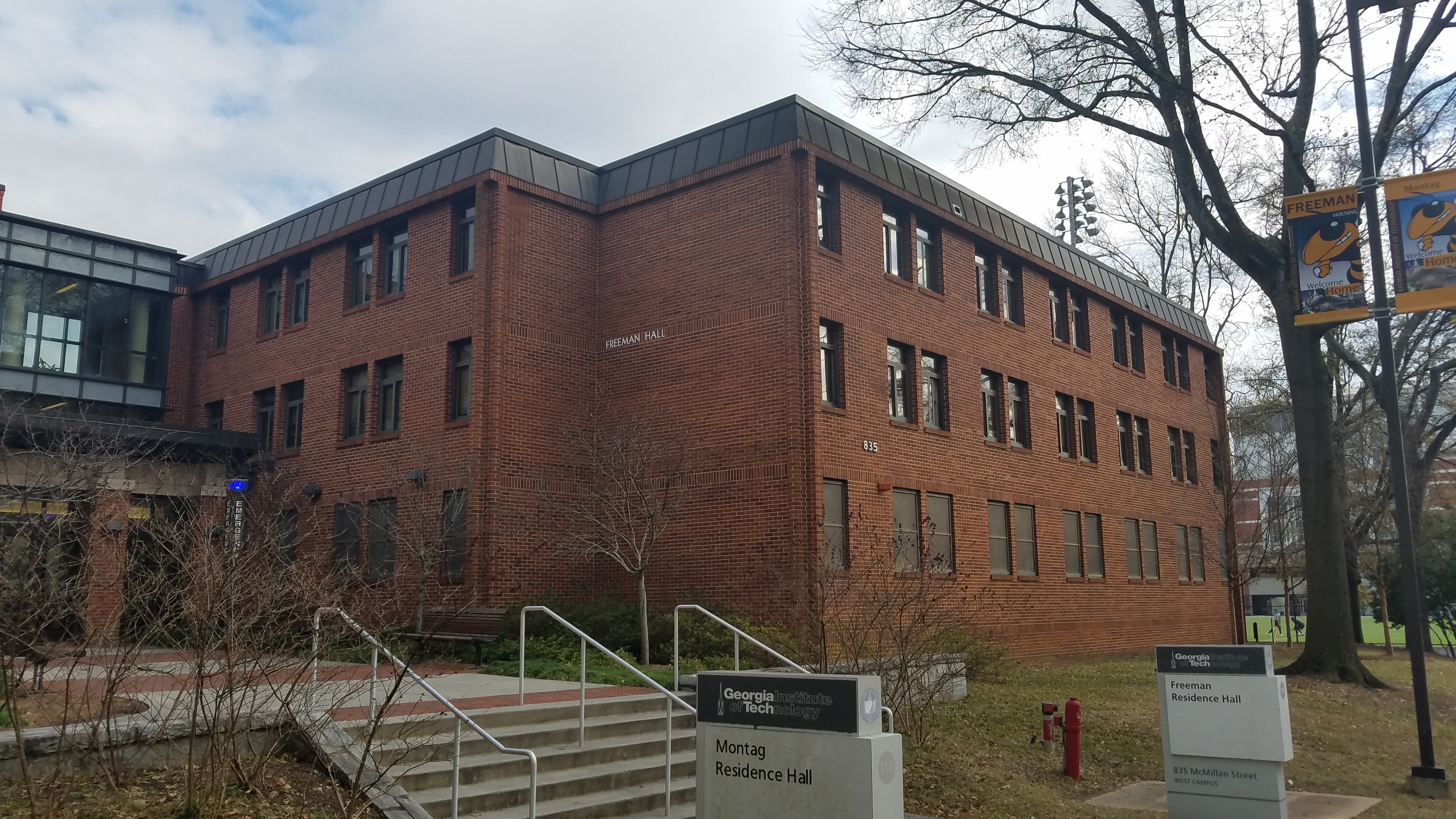
Freeman Hall

Freeman Residence Hall is a traditional co-ed residence hall in the Georgia Tech Freshman Experience. Freeman is co-ed by floor and part of Fitten, Freeman, and Montag group often abbreviated "3FM." Freeman was originally built for $580,000 and was designed by the architects Bradbury & Associates. The hall was last renovated in 2011 and as of 2019 has a bed count of 112. Freeman is connected to Montag, its sibling dorm.

The dorm is named after movie producer and Tech alum Y. Frank Freeman.

==== Fulmer Hall ====
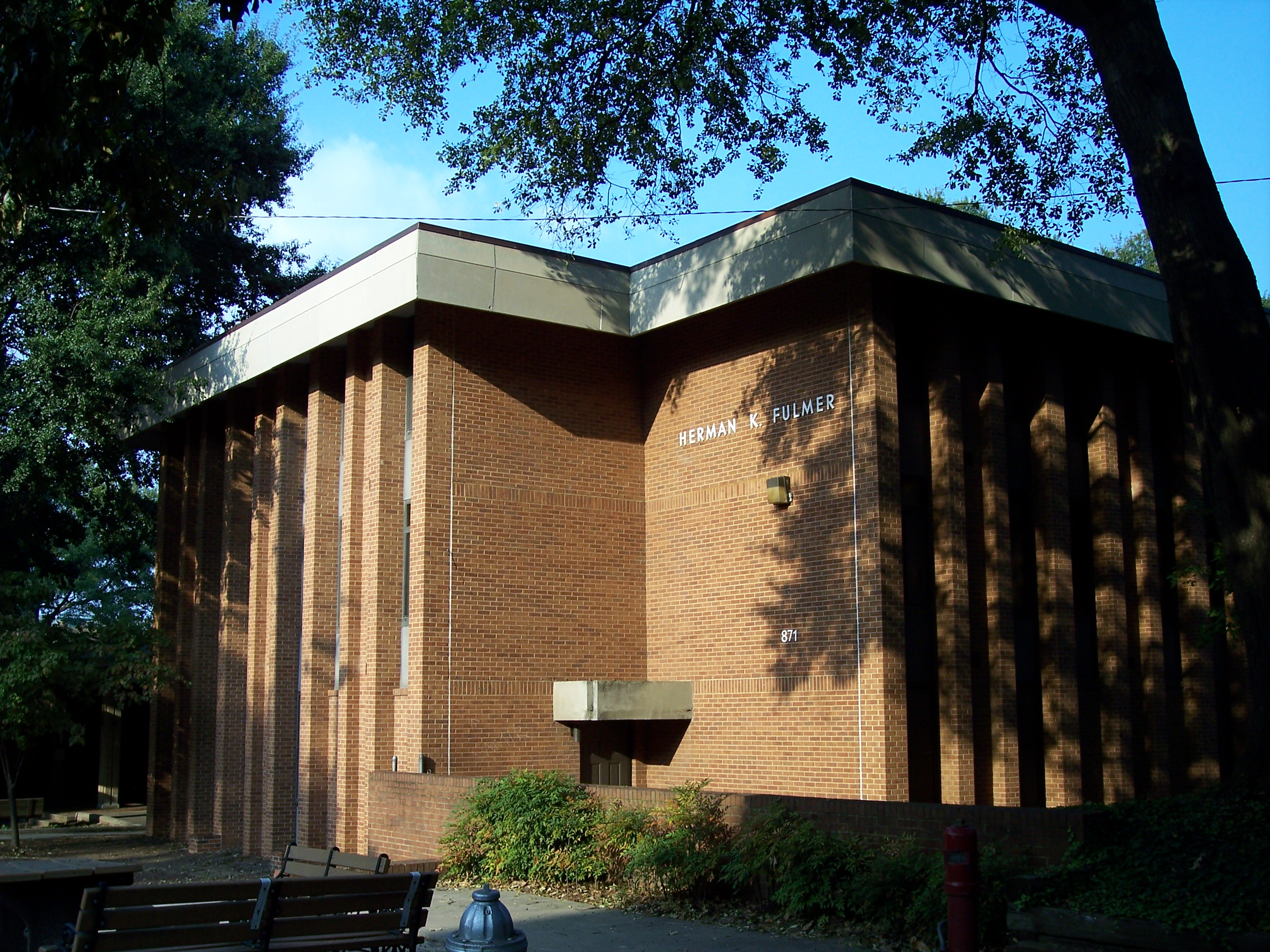
Fulmer Hall

Fulmer Residence Hall is a traditional-style female-only residence hall at the Georgia Institute of Technology. It opened in 1969 as the first female dormitory on the campus and was last renovated in 2000. It is dedicated to Herman K. Fulmer, who was an associate professor of Mathematics at Georgia Tech. As of 2019 it has a bed count of 60, making it one of the smallest residence halls on campus. The building includes laundry rooms on the 2nd and 3rd floors.

Fulmer originally cost $327,000 to construct and was designed by James C. Wise, Simpson, Aiken and Associates.

==== Glenn Hall ====
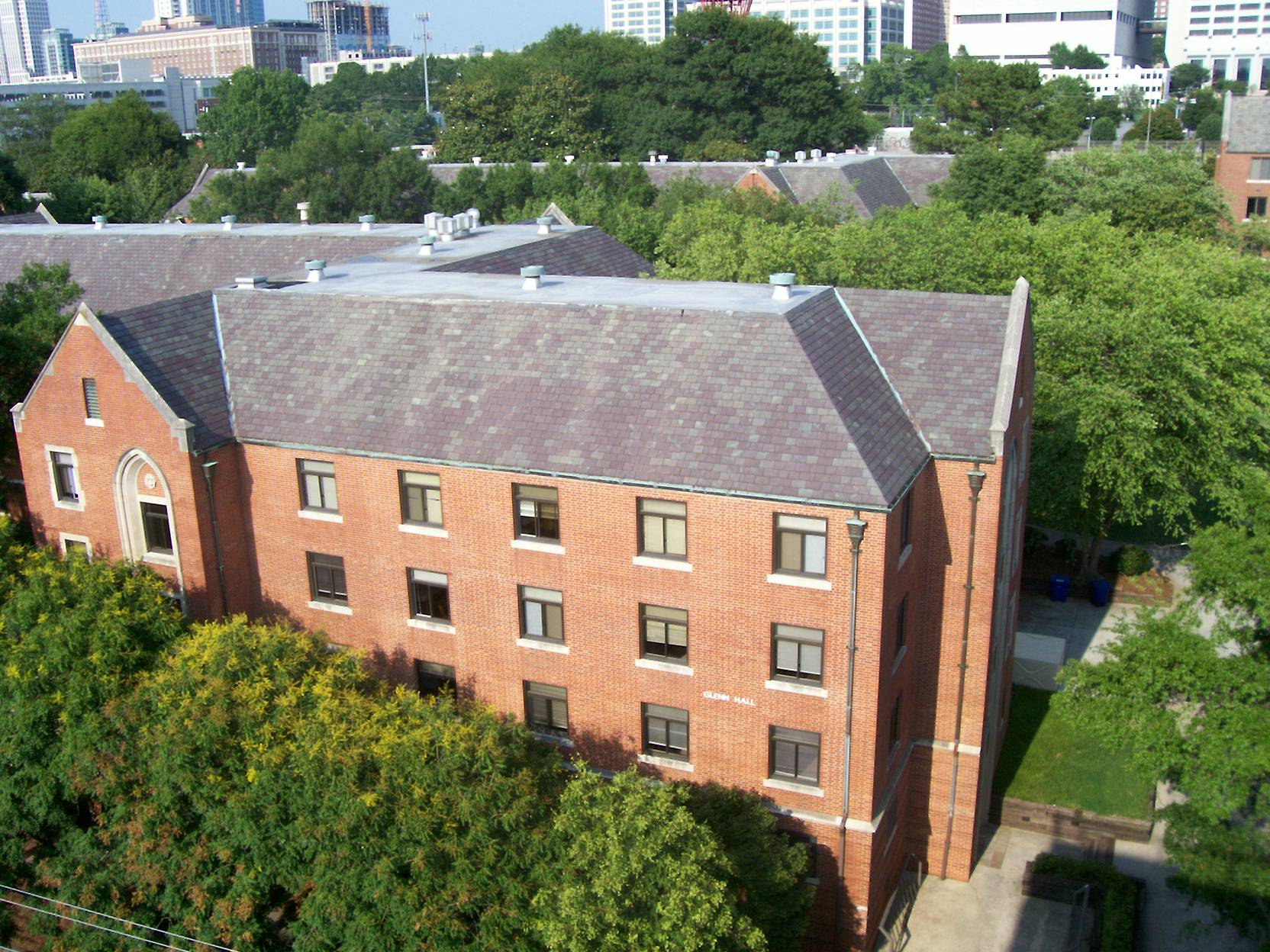
Glenn Hall

Glenn Residence Hall is a co-ed residence hall, currently housing first-year students, that was previously all-male. Glenn is dedicated to William H. Glenn, a Tech alumnus who assisted in the creation of the Georgia Tech Alumni Association. Glenn Hall is a prime location for the Georgia Tech sports fan; it is the closest freshman residence hall to Bobby Dodd Stadium and Alexander Memorial Coliseum, and is right next to the lawn known as the Quad. It is also next to the GT Connector, a study space between Glenn and Towers that also includes a small gym. It was last renovated in 2015 and as of 2019 has a bed count of 351. The Glenn residence hall houses members of the Grand Challenges and Global Leadership Living Learning Communities.

Glenn Hall originally cost $607,000 to construct and was designed by Bush-Brown, Gailey, & Heffernan in 1947. Glenn Hall has four floors of residents and is flanked by Bobby Dodd Stadium and Towers Hall.

==== Hanson Hall ====
Hanson Residence Hall is a traditional co-ed residence hall located on East Campus in the Georgia Tech Freshman Experience. Hanson is dedicated to John F. Hanson and is coed. The hall was built in 1961 and last renovated in 2002. As of 2019 it has a bed count of 118.

==== Harris Hall ====
Harris Residence Hall is a residence hall located on East Campus in the Georgia Tech Freshman Experience. Harris is dedicated to N.E. Harris and is coed. The hall was built in 1926 and last renovated in 1992. As of 2019 it has a bed count of 94.

==== Harrison Hall ====
Harrison Residence Hall is a residence hall in the Georgia Tech Freshman Experience. Harrison is dedicated to George W. Harrison and currently all female. Harrison is the sister building to Howell Hall, both being built in 1939 behind Brittain Dining Hall. Harrison originally cost $183,000 to construct and was designed by the architects Bush-Brown & Gailey. Harrison also houses FE North's primary Learning Assistance Program location in its larger second floor lounge. The building was last renovated in 1998. As of 2019 it has a bed count of 155.

==== Hefner Hall ====
Hefner Residence Hall is a traditional co-ed residence hall on West Campus in the Georgia Tech Freshman Experience and Honors Program. The hall was named for Ralph A. Hefner. It was built in 1969 and last renovated in 2008. As of 2019 it has a bed count of 112. It is the sibling dorm of Armstrong.

==== Hopkins Hall ====
Hopkins Residence Hall is a residence hall located on East Campus in the Georgia Tech Freshman Experience. The hall was named for Isaac S. Hopkins. It was built in 1961 and last renovated in 1995. As of 2019 it has a bed count of 134.

==== Howell Hall ====
Howell Residence Hall is a residence hall in the Georgia Tech Freshman Experience. It is named for Clark Howell, original endower of the WBBF radio station, which later became WGST and WAFS and is now WGKA. Howell Hall was designed by architects Bush-Brown & Gailey for $163,000. Originally constructed in 1939, it underwent renovation as part of Georgia Tech's effort to renovate residence halls preceding the 1996 Olympics. The hall was last renovated in 1999 and as of 2019 has a bed count of 123.

==== Matheson Hall ====
Matheson Residence Hall is a residence hall on East Campus in the Georgia Tech Freshman Experience and Global Leadership Program. The hall was built in 1961 and last renovated in 2002. As of 2019 it has a bed count of 152.

==== Montag Hall ====
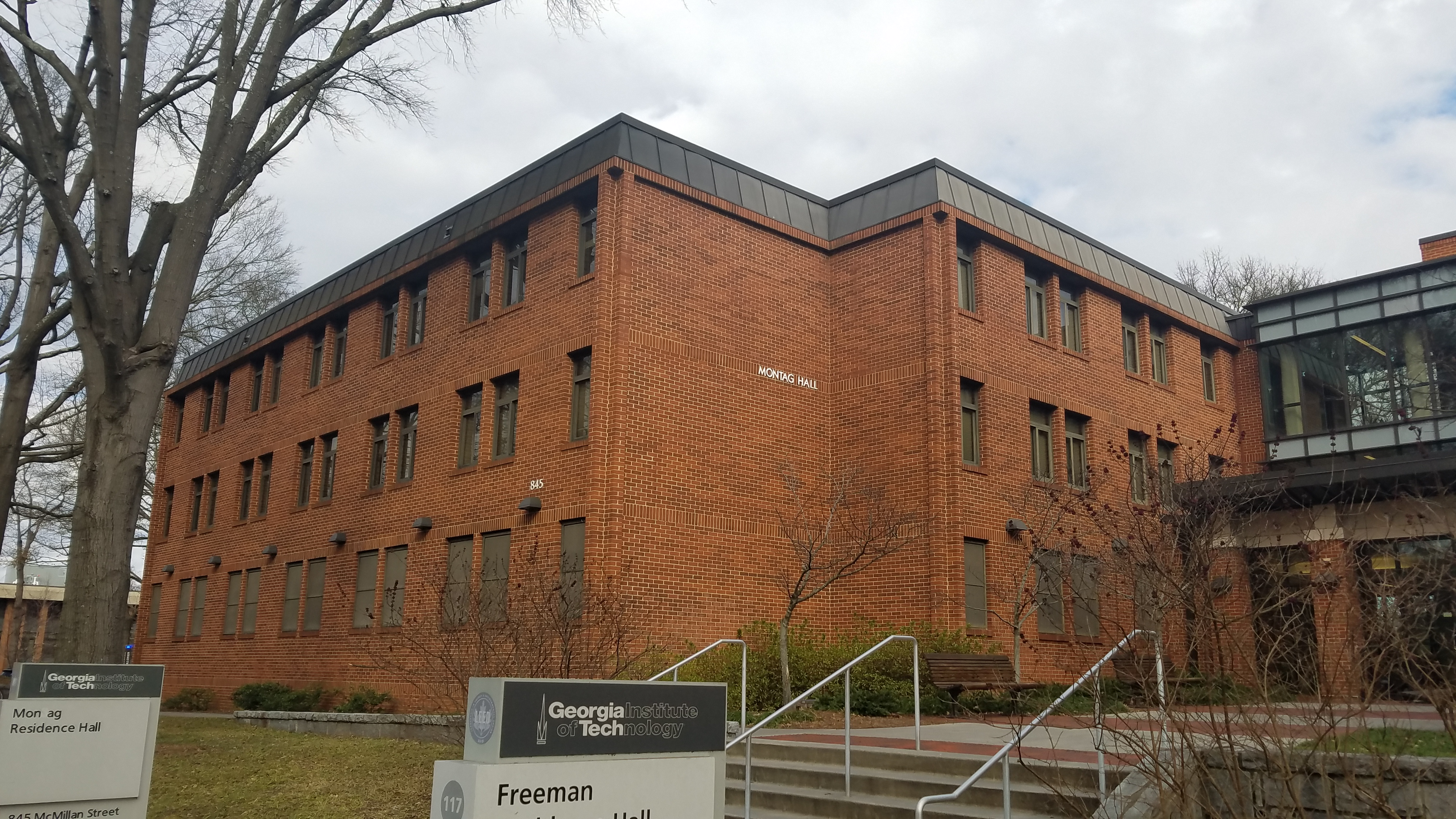
Montag Hall

Montag Residence Hall is a residence hall in the Georgia Tech Freshman Experience. Montag is coed by floor and part of Fitten, Freeman, and Montag group often abbreviated "FFM." The building is named after Harold E. Montag, a 1918 Tech alum. The hall was built in 1972, last renovated in 2011, and as of 2019 has a bed count of 114.

Montag was originally built for $632,000 and was designed by the architects Bradbury & Associates.

==== Perry Hall ====
Perry Residence Hall is a residence hall on East Campus in the Georgia Tech Freshman Experience and Global Leadership Program. The hall was built in 1961 and last renovated in 2002. As of 2019 it has a bed count of 122.

==== Smith Hall ====
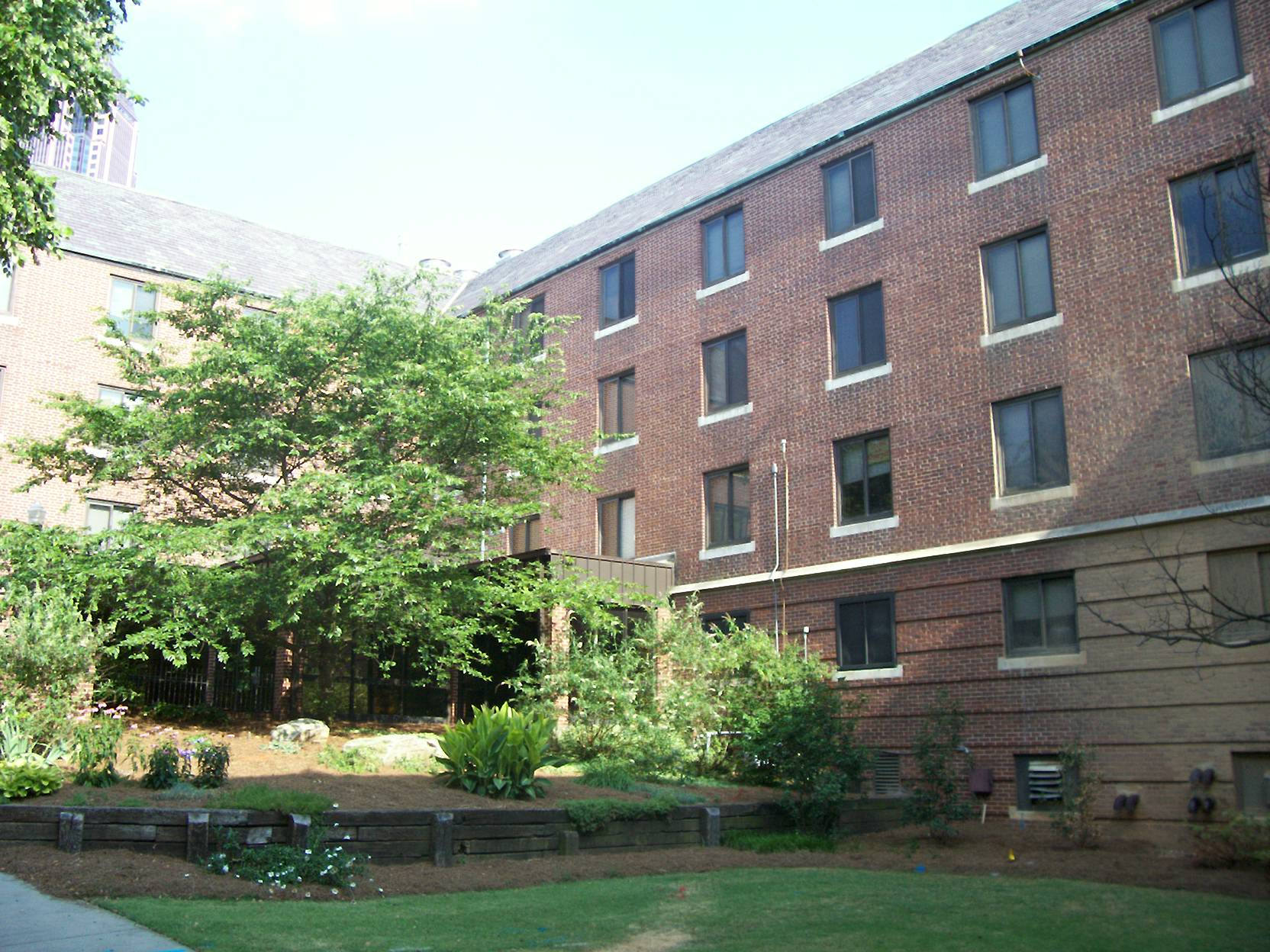
Smith Hall

Smith Residence Hall is a residence hall dedicated to John M. Smith, member of the first graduating class in Tech history. Smith Hall was designed under President Van Leer's tenure by the architects Bush-Brown, Gailey and Heffernan and built for $614,000.

Smith Hall was originally designed as the athlete dormitory with a built-in cafeteria and hot tub. The cafeteria on the third floor has since been converted into a lounge but still retains the cafeteria serving line and salad bar. The room was the 6-man flex space in the Fall 2004-Spring 2005 and Fall 2005-Spring 2006 school years.

Before the completion of Peterson dorms on West, Smith was the largest Freshman Experience dorm by area with 5 total floors, allocating 4 for residents. The broad side faces North Ave and the building is flanked by Brown Hall and Williams Street. The hall was last renovated in 1993 and as of 2019 has a bed count of 295.

==== Towers Hall ====
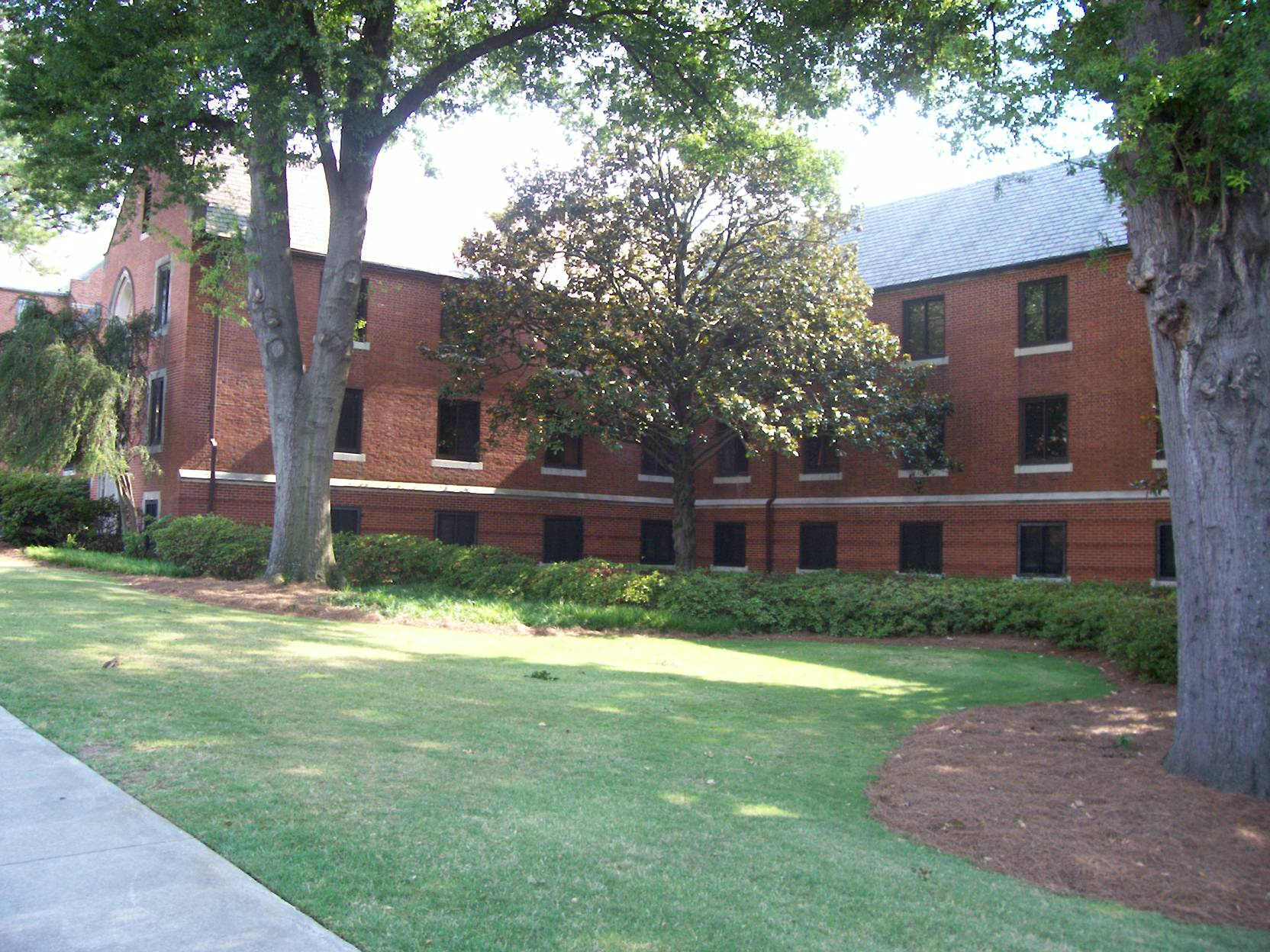
Towers Hall

Towers Residence Hall is a co-ed residence hall in the Georgia Tech Freshman Experience located on the east side of campus. Towers is dedicated to Donigan Dean Towers.

Towers Residence Hall originally cost $481,000 to construct and was designed by architects Bush-Brown, Gailey, & Heffernan. It was built in 1947 by contractor J. A. Jones.

Towers was home to Dean James E. Dull during the early 1960s. While he resided in the staff apartment, he spotted a Ford Model A outside of Towers that would eventually become the Ramblin' Wreck.

In Fall 2006, Towers Hall housed the infamous "triples", which was a project that put three residents into a two-man room. Certain pieces of furniture were not provided to the third resident as to accommodate a third bed. When spaces became available in other parts of campus, the third resident was moved elsewhere.

In May 2013, Towers was taken offline as part of a two-year $41.5M renovation project to both Towers and Glenn Hall. The renovations will upgrade electrical, plumbing, HVAC, and fire protection systems of both buildings. There will also be new laundry rooms, bathrooms and study rooms amongst other amenities on each floor. For the first time in the buildings' history, elevators will be installed. A connecting building will also be constructed between Towers and Glenn, fulfilling the original 1940 master plan, which will include other student services. Renovations were completed for Towers before the 2014–2015 school year. Glenn was taken offline in May 2014 for its phase of the renovation and reopened in July 2015.

==== Woodruff Hall ====
Woodruff Residence Hall is a co-ed suite-style residence hall located on West Campus. The hall is divided into two sections, Woodruff North and Woodruff South. Prior to its closure, these two buildings were linked by Woodruff Dining Hall. Both buildings were built in 1984 and as of 2019 had a combined total bed count of 532. The Woodruff dorms are suite-style, meaning two traditional two-person rooms are connected by a shared bathroom. It also currently houses members of the Design Bloc Living Learning community.

=== Apartments ===
The apartments on Georgia Tech's main campus were originally constructed as part of the Olympic Village for the 1996 Olympic Games. In preparation for the games, seven apartment-style residence halls were constructed for $108.3 million. Center Street, Crecine, Eighth Street, Maulding, Nelson Shell, and Zbar are located on West Campus while North Avenue is located on East. Most apartments, outside of Eighth Street for Honors students, are solely reserved for upperclassmen living.

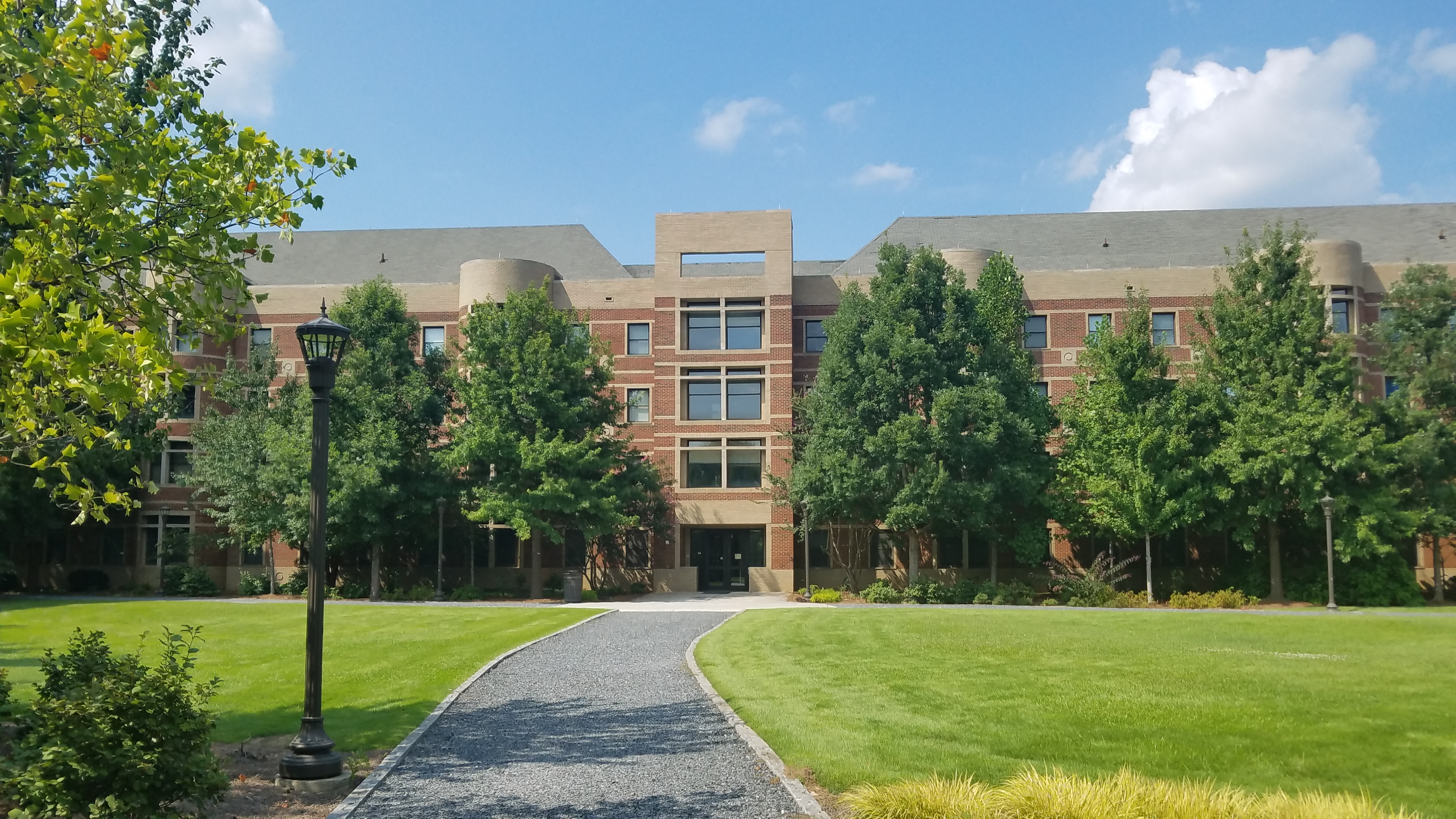
Center Street South

==== Center Street Apartments ====
Center Street Apartments are separated into two buildings known as Center Street North and South. As of 2012, North houses 160 residents and South houses 192. Together, the Center Street Apartments originally cost $14.024 million to construct and was designed by John Portman & Associates. John Portman is a famous alumnus of the university, graduating from Georgia Tech in 1950.

==== Crecine Apartments ====
Crecine Apartments originally cost $13.235 million to construct and was designed by Jova Daniel Busby. Crecine was originally known as Hemphill Avenue Apartments based on its location and proximity to Hemphill Avenue, but was renamed in 2008 in honor of former Georgia Tech President John Patrick Crecine, who had died earlier in the year.

==== Eighth Street Apartments ====
Eighth Street Apartments are separated into 3 buildings which are known as either East, South, or West. East houses 216 residents, South houses 188, and West houses 248. Together, the Eighth Street Apartments originally cost $24.844 million to construct and was designed by Cooper Carry. The Eighth Street apartments house the Honors Program at Georgia Tech. Through the Honors Program, freshmen in the program have access to live in these apartments.

==== Maulding Apartments ====
Maulding Apartments are apartment-style residence halls at Georgia Tech located on West Campus. As of 2019 it has a bed count of 249.

==== Nelson Shell Apartments ====
Nelson Shell Apartments are apartment-style residence halls located on West Campus. The apartments were built in 1992 and last renovated in 2013, when the name was changed from Undergraduate Living Center to its current name. As of 2019 it has a bed count of 430.

==== North Avenue Apartments ====
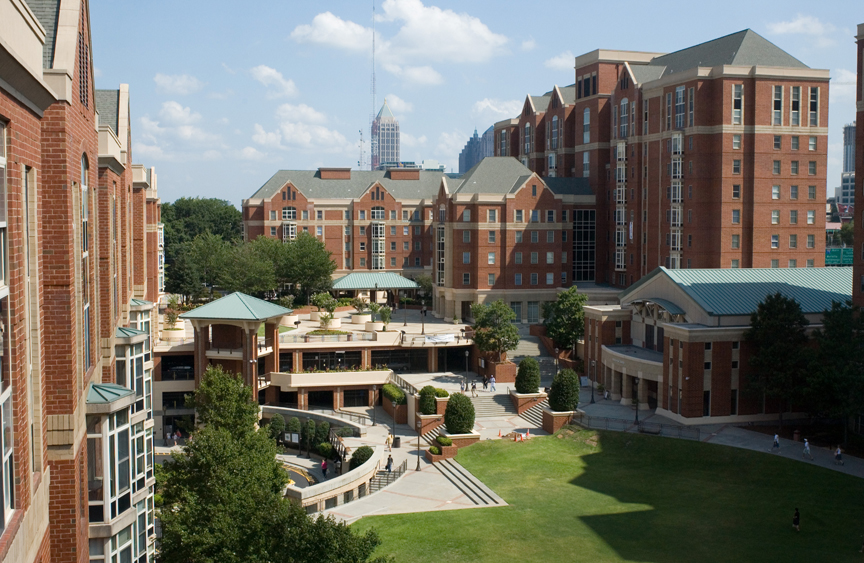
North Avenue Apartments

North Avenue Apartments consists of four buildings collectively housing over 2,000 students known as East, North, South, and West. Open to second-year undergraduate students and above, the buildings are located on East Campus, across North Avenue and near Bobby Dodd Stadium, putting more upperclassmen on East Campus.

Originally built for the 1996 Olympics, it was owned by Georgia State University as their first student housing. Georgia Tech purchased the residence halls from Georgia State in 2007. The North Avenue Apartments are noted as the first Georgia Tech buildings to rise above the top of Tech Tower. In 2008, the East and North buildings underwent extensive renovation to the façade. During their construction, the bricks were not all properly secured and thus were a safety hazard to pedestrians and vehicles on the Downtown Connector below.

==== Zbar Apartments ====
Zbar Apartments, formerly known as Sixth Street Apartments, are apartment-style residence halls located on West Campus. The apartments were built in 1995. As of 2019 it has a bed count of 228.

=== Houses ===
These four houses were built as part of the 1996 Olympic Village and originally known collectively as the Fourth Street Apartments. Currently they serve as housing for members of specific programs, such as the Women, Science, & Technology program (Stein and Goldin) or the International House program (Hayes and Gray). The houses have single-room suite-style living, meaning each resident has their own room connected to another's via a shared bathroom. A kitchen is shared among the floor.

The Fourth Street Apartments consist of:

- Goldin House
- Gray House
- Hayes House
- Stein House

=== Graduate Housing ===
Tech has two apartment-style residence halls located just north of main campus, available to graduate students. The Graduate Living Center was constructed in 1992 and last renovated in 2009. As of 2026, it has a bed count of 347. Tenth and Home was built in 2005 and is divided into seven buildings labeled alphabetically A through G. As of 2019, they have a collective bed count of 529.

== Dining halls ==
The main campus is currently home to two buffet-style dining halls (both located on East Campus) and one station-style dining commons (located on West Campus). In addition, multiple chain restaurants, such as Chick-fil-A and Panda Express are present on the main campus, mainly located in the John Lewis Student Center.

=== Brittain Dining Hall ===
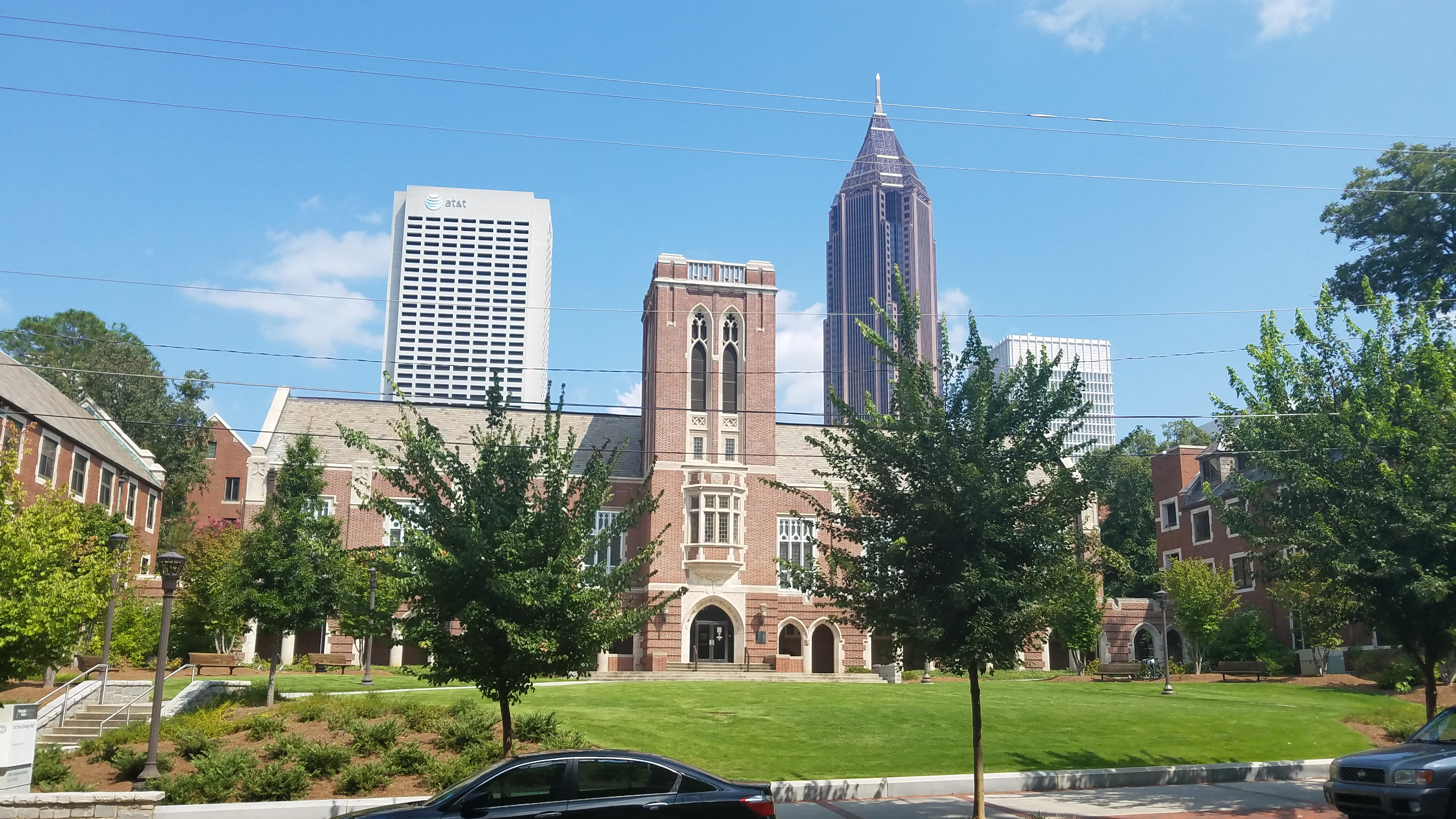
Marion L. Brittain Dining Hall

Marion L. Brittain Dining Hall is the oldest dining hall on campus and the main dining hall of the freshman dorms on East Campus. Opened in 1928, it cost $418,000 to construct and has been renovated in 1964, 1999, 2002, and 2007. The building is named for former Georgia Tech President Marion L. Brittain.

=== North Avenue Dining Hall ===
Opened in Fall 2011, North Avenue Dining Hall (colloquially referred to as Nav) is a dining hall on East Campus located in the North Avenue Apartment complex. The dining hall was part of a large renovation project conducted after Georgia Tech's acquisition of the apartments from Georgia State.

=== West Village Dining Commons ===
One of the most recent additions to Georgia Tech's culinary scene, West Village Dining Commons (colloquially known as Willage) opened in Fall 2017 and represents the multiple dining options available at the West Village Commons. Prior to its construction, the location was home to a parking lot in front of the Caldwell and Folk Residence Halls. The dining commons is a departure from the typical buffet-style dining halls and instead offers a station-style dining experience similar to a food court. Following the closure of Woodruff Dining Hall in 2017, West Village is the only campus-affiliated dining option on West Campus.

== Religious organizations ==
Georgia Tech is home to a myriad of different religious and faith-based organizations, several of which have buildings on campus to serve affiliated students.

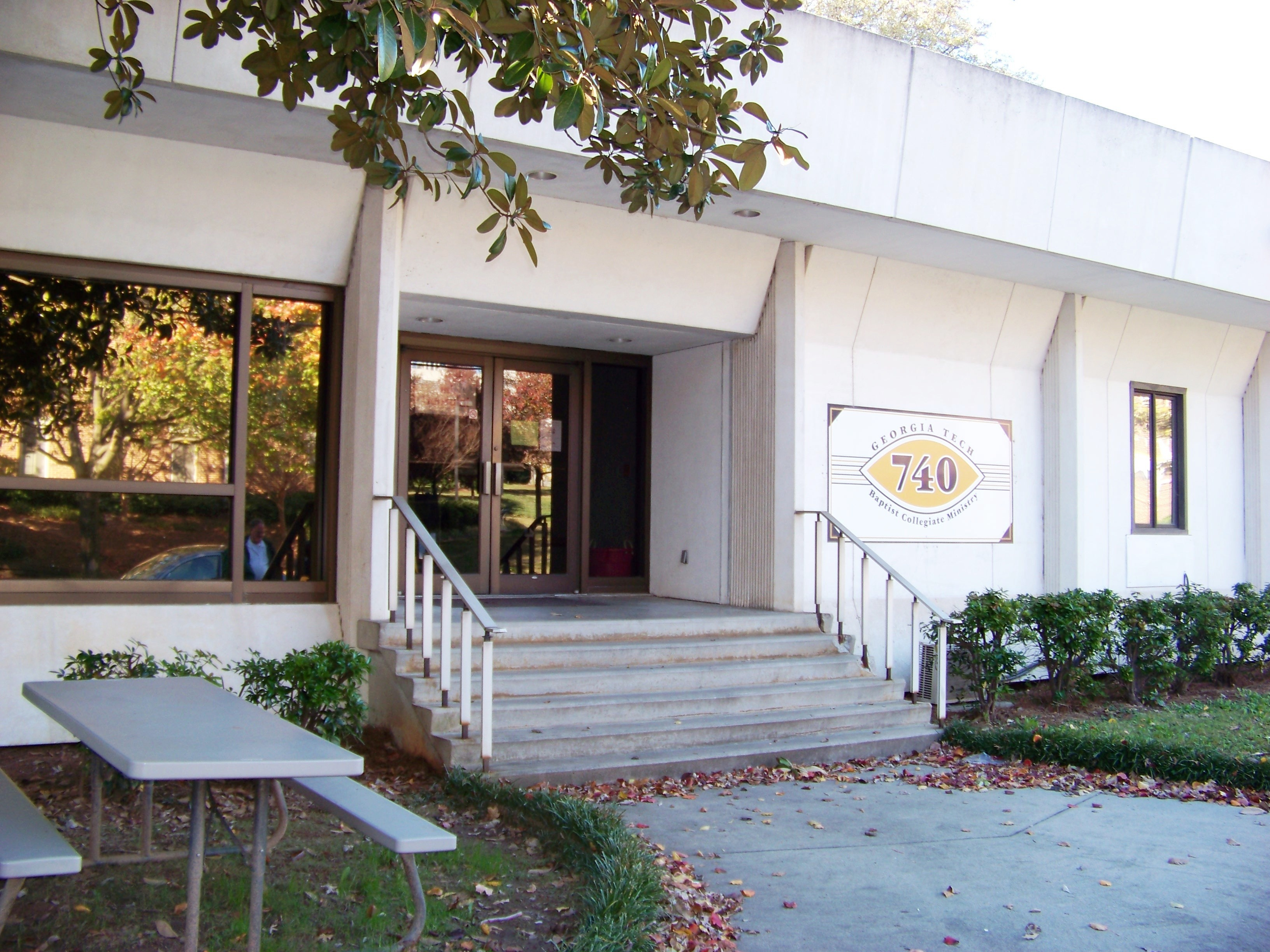
Baptist Collegiate Ministry at Georgia Tech

Baptist Collegiate Ministry is a Baptist organization located at 740 Techwood Drive on East Campus which is supported by multiple nearby Baptist churches.

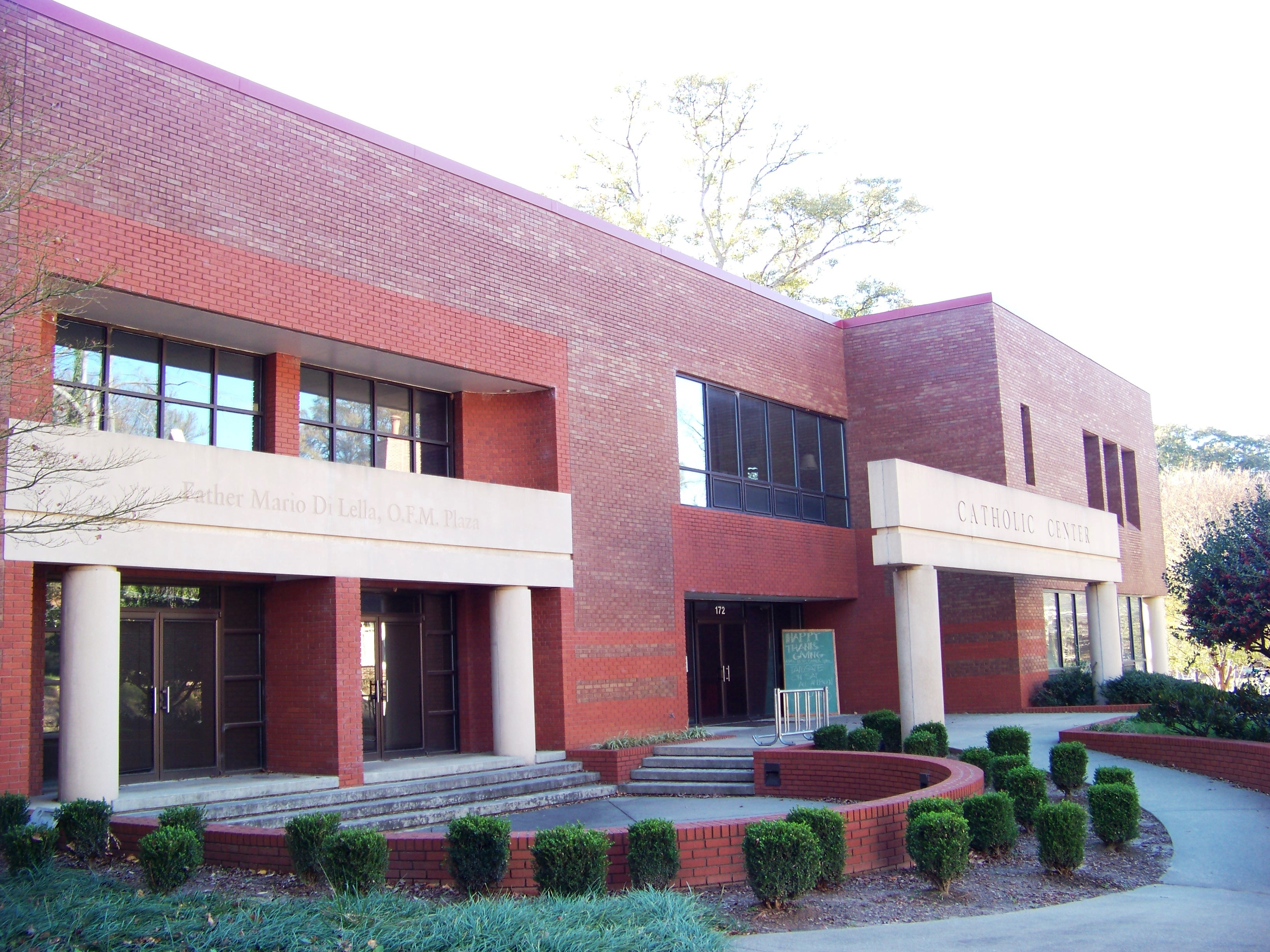
Catholic Center at Georgia Tech

The Georgia Tech Catholic Center, located at 172 Fourth Street, is a Roman Catholic center operated by the Catholic Students Organization, an official Georgia Tech student group. The center has been at its current location since 1985.

Christian Campus Fellowship is a non-denominational evangelical Christian group founded on campus in 1987 by Rick and Beth Harper, located at 767 Techwood Drive on East Campus.

The Grace House is a Lutheran campus ministry organization supported by the Lutheran Church of the Redeemer in Midtown Atlanta. The house is located on East Campus at 182 Fifth Street and holds worship every Tuesday night.

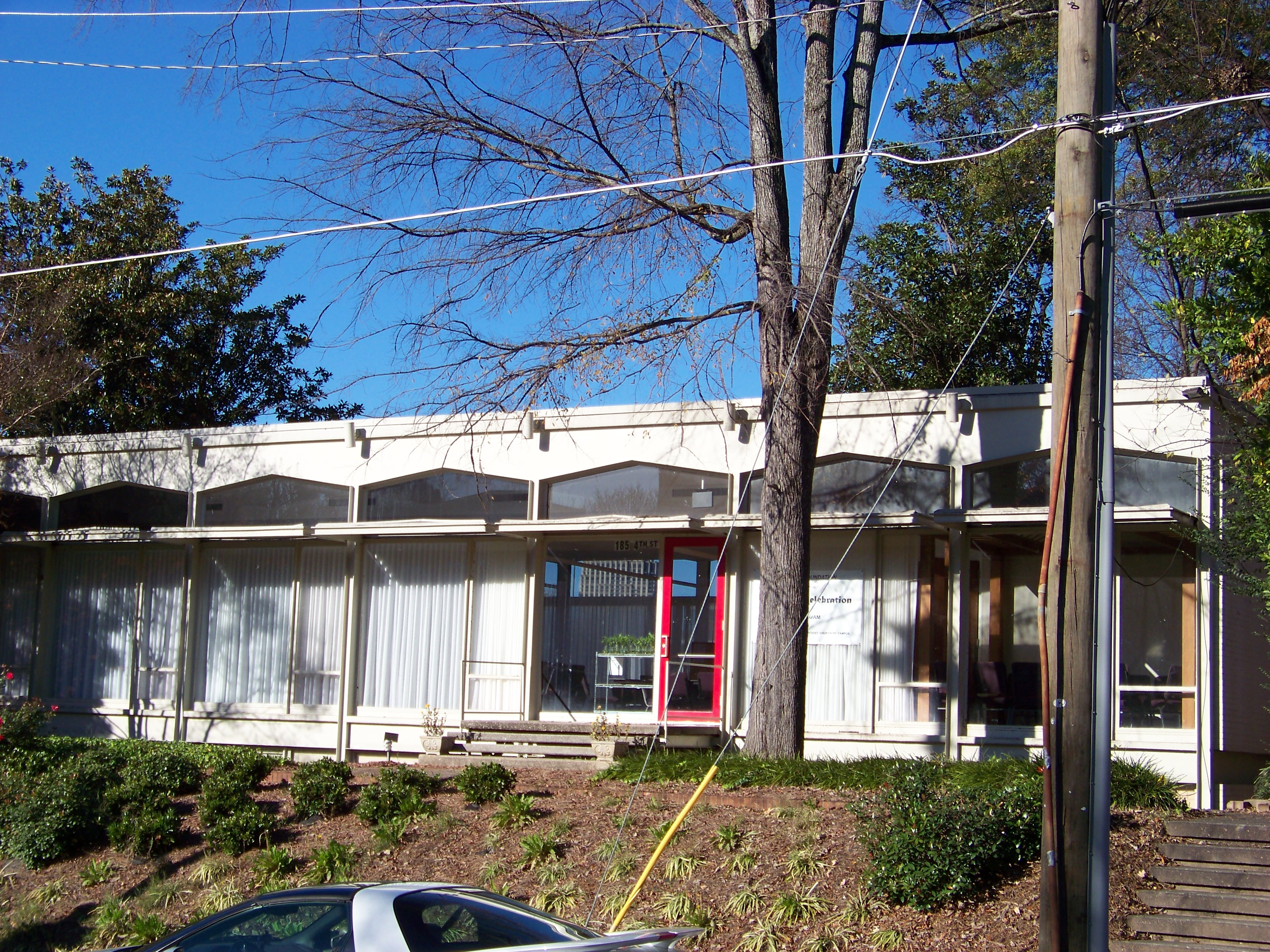
Wesley Foundation at Georgia Tech

The Wesley Foundation at Georgia Tech is a Wesley Foundation sponsored by the United Methodist Church. Located at 189 Fourth Street, they hold traditional worship services every Sunday and evening services on Tuesday.

Reformed University Fellowship (RUF) at Georgia Tech is a campus ministry that seeks to be an honest community for the convinced and unconvinced to explore historic Christianity and learn together what it means to follow Jesus with our whole lives. Reformed University Fellowship is the campus ministry organization of the Presbyterian Church in America (PCA).

The Rohr Chabad House at Georgia Tech and Georgia State is a Chabad house located just north of campus at 471 Tenth Street serving the campuses of both Georgia Tech and nearby Georgia State.

Located on East Campus at 724 Techwood Drive, Westminster Christian Fellowship is a Westminster-affiliated Presbyterian Christian group with worship services every Wednesday.

== Sports venues ==
Georgia Tech's main campus is home to multiple sports venues for the institute's multiple intercollegiate sports teams, known as the Georgia Tech Yellow Jackets.

=== Bobby Dodd Stadium ===
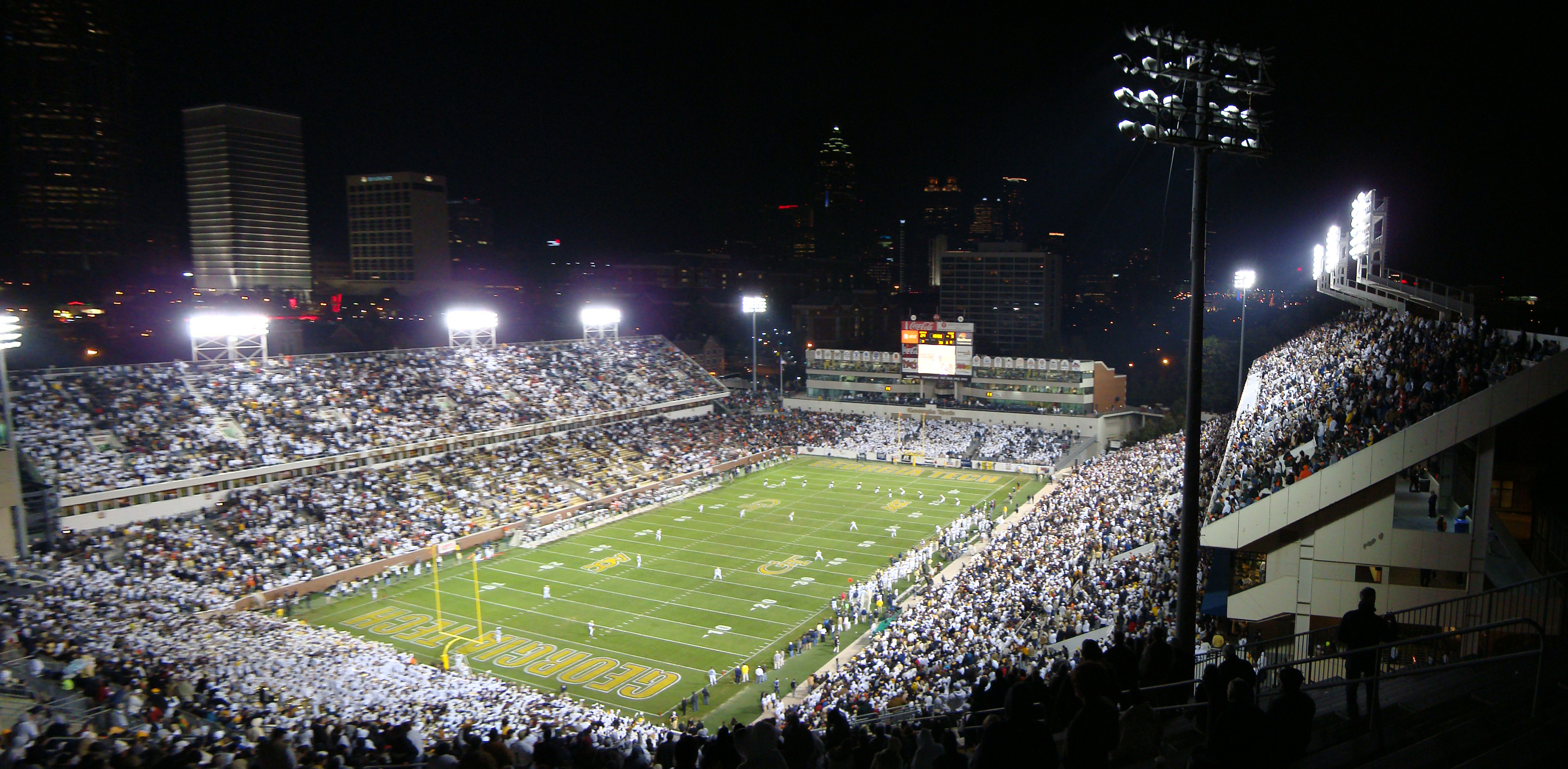
Bobby Dodd Stadium

Located on East Campus, Bobby Dodd Stadium at Historic Grant Field serves as the stadium for the Georgia Tech Yellow Jackets football team. Originally built in 1913, the stadium is the oldest on-campus stadium in NCAA Division I FBS and has been the site of more home wins than any other FBS stadium.

=== McCamish Pavilion ===
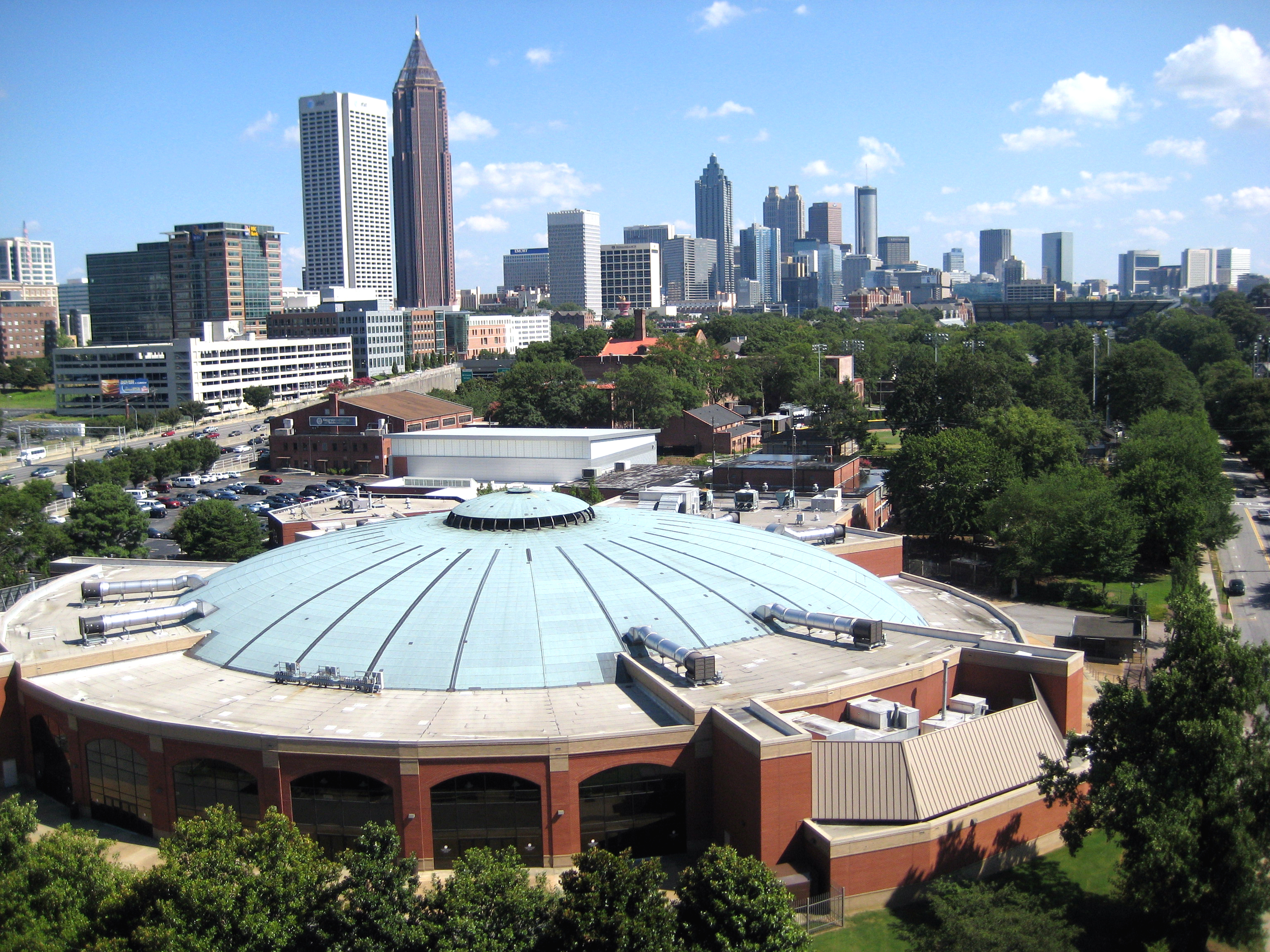
McCamish Pavilion

Located on the northeast corner of campus, Hank McCamish Pavilion serves as the home venue for both the Georgia Tech Yellow Jackets basketball team and the Georgia Tech Yellow Jackets women's basketball team. Originally known as Alexander Memorial Coliseum, the arena has been a fixture on campus since its construction in 1956 and experienced a massive renovation and re-opening in 2012.

=== Russ Chandler Stadium ===
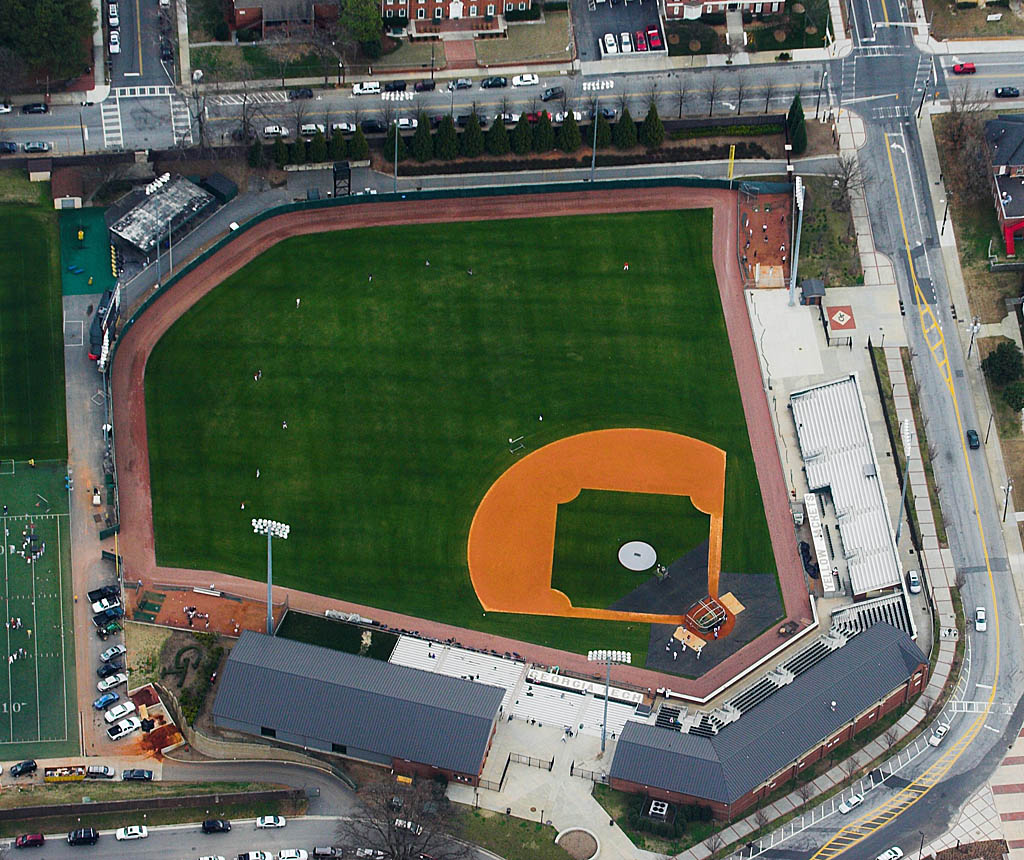
Russ Chandler Stadium

Located in Central Campus on Ferst Drive, Russ Chandler Stadium at Rose Bowl Field serves as the home venue for the Georgia Tech Yellow Jackets baseball team. The venue originally opened in 1930 and experienced a major renovation in 2002.

=== Mewborn Field ===
Located on East Campus, Shirley Clements Mewborn Field has served as the home field for the Georgia Tech Yellow Jackets softball team since its opening on March 10, 2009. Prior to its construction, the softball team's home field was Glenn Field, located off campus adjacent to Atlantic Station.

=== Byers Tennis Complex ===
Located on East Campus across the street from McCamish Pavilion, the Ken Byers Tennis Complex is the home venue for both the Georgia Tech men's and women's tennis teams. Opened in January 2013 on the site of the former Bill Moore Tennis Center, the complex is named after Tech alum Ken Byers, whose generous donation aided in its construction. The complex's indoor facility (which maintains the Bill Moore Tennis Center name) features six courts, while the outdoor facility features six competition courts and four practice courts.

=== O'Keefe Gymnasium ===
Located on East Campus and originally utilized as the gymnasium for O'Keefe High School in the 1950s, O'Keefe Gymnasium was gifted to the Georgia Institute of Technology in the 1960s and has served as the home venue for the Georgia Tech Yellow Jackets volleyball team since 1995. Since 1995 the facility has witnessed multiple renovations and improvements, including the addition of a new floor in 2003 and a massive renovation in 2006 that included new locker rooms, a training room, and a study area.

=== Campus Recreation Center ===
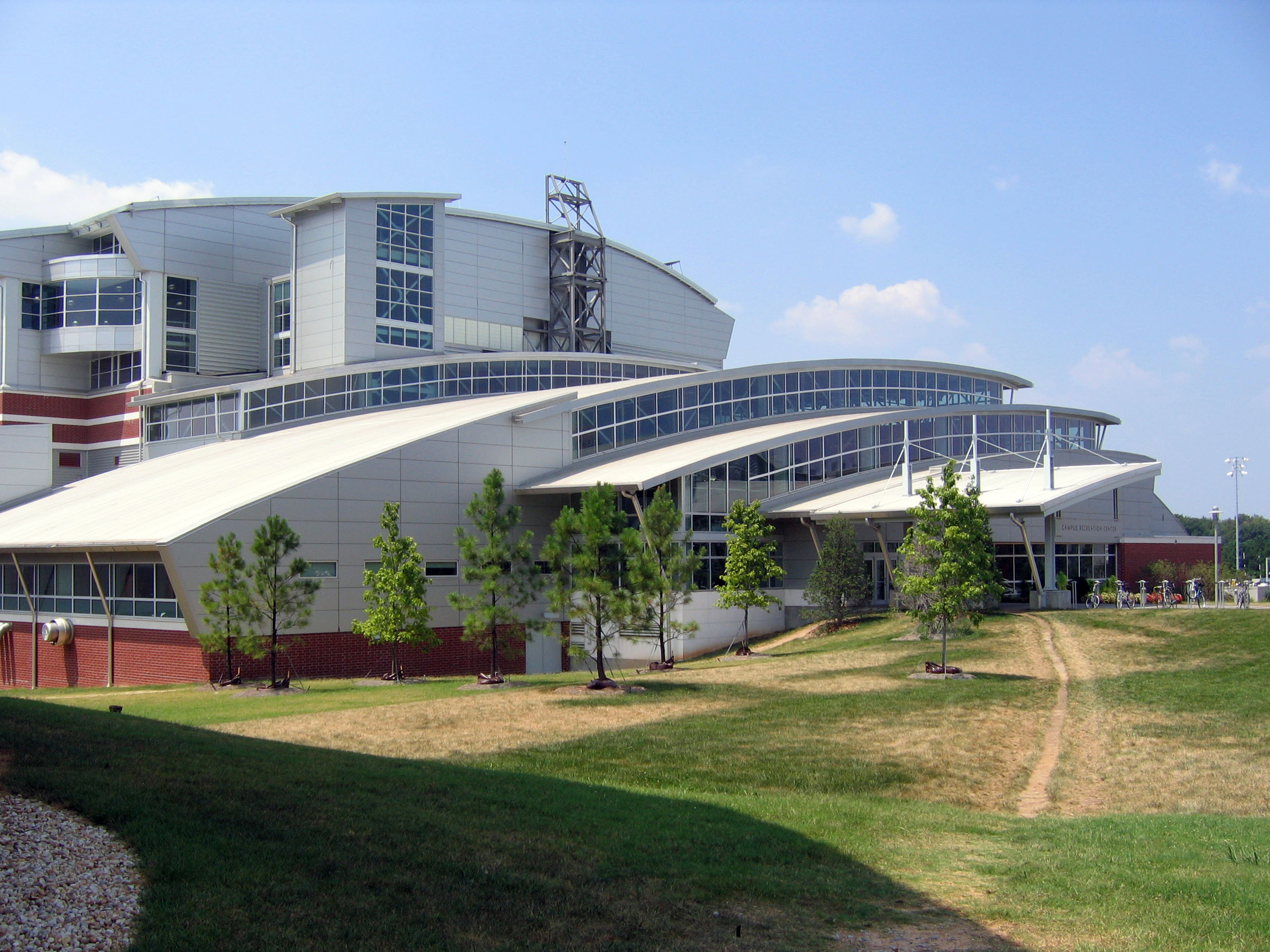
Campus Recreation Center

Located on West Campus, within the Campus Recreation Center, the McAuley Aquatic Center serves as the home venue for the Georgia Tech Yellow Jackets swimming and diving program. Formerly known as the Georgia Tech Aquatic Center, the facility was constructed for the 1996 Olympic Games and was host to all swimming, diving, and synchronized swimming events. The center was officially renamed in 2016 in honor of Georgia Tech alum James Herbert "Herb" McAuley, who had previously served as a swim coach at Georgia Tech.

=== Noonan Golf Facility ===
Situated slightly off main campus, (just north of Home Park) the Noonan Golf Facility is a 13-acre golf complex where members of the Georgia Tech Yellow Jackets golf team practice. Named for two Georgia Tech alums, Kim P. Noonan and Thomas E. Noonan, the facility opened on February 17, 2017 and includes the David Dorman Short Game Area and the Linda and Ray Helton Par 3 Course.

== Miscellaneous buildings ==
=== Academy of Medicine ===
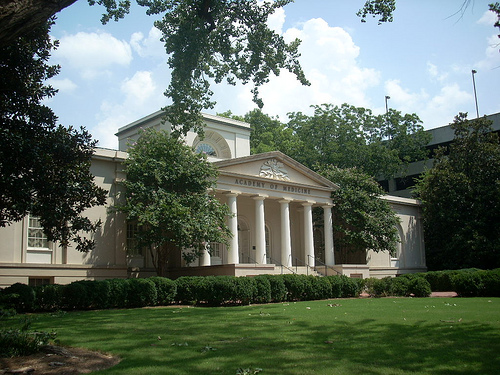
Academy of Medicine

Located slightly north of Tech Square, the Academy of Medicine is an historic building located in Midtown Atlanta which was acquired by the Georgia Institute of Technology in 2008. The building was constructed in 1941 to serve as the headquarters for the Atlanta Medical Society, now known as the Medical Association of Atlanta. In 2010, the Institute launched a $6 million renovation project, with the building reopening the following year.

=== Crum & Forster Building ===
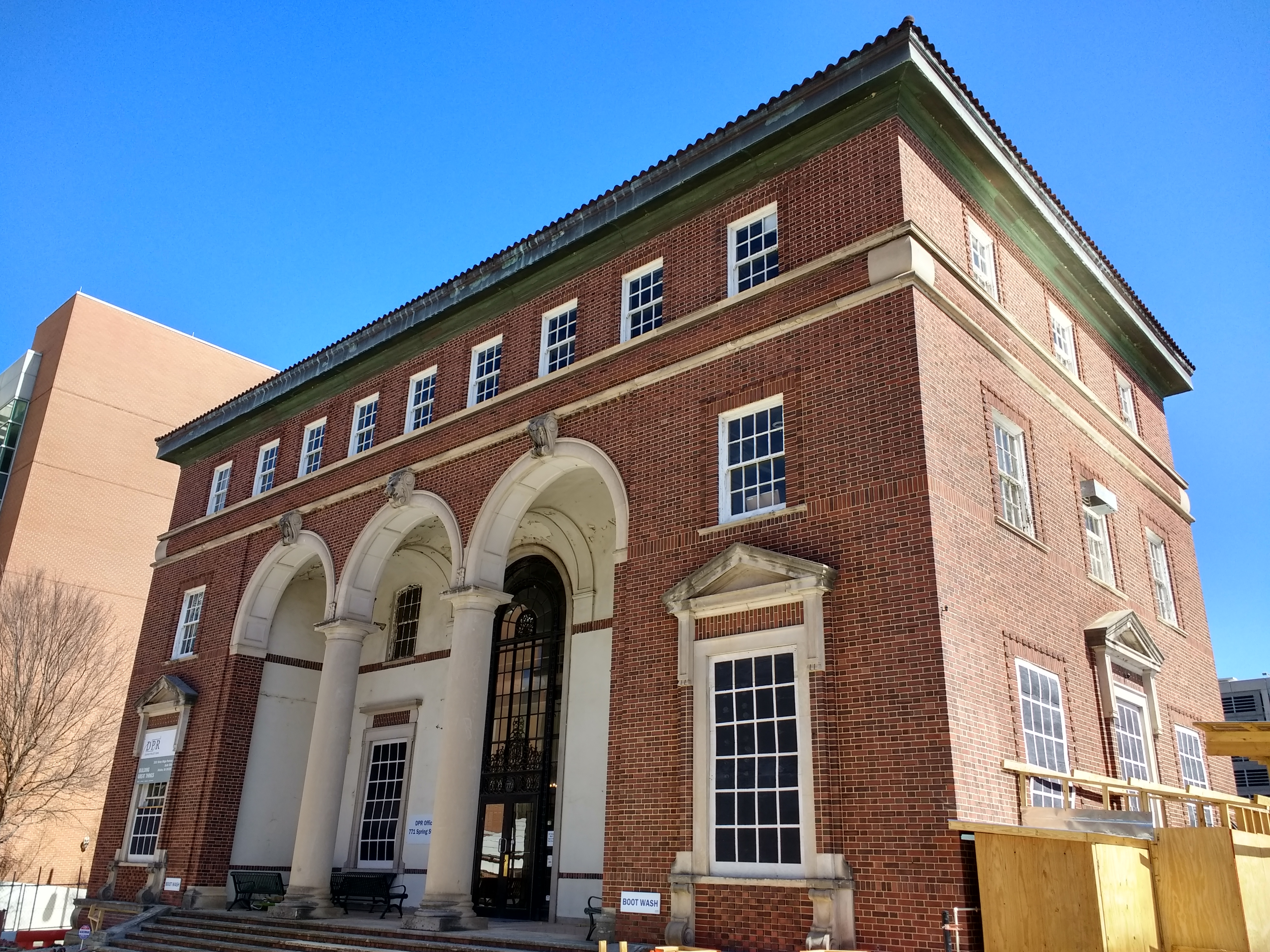
Crum & Forster Building during the construction of the Coda Building

Located on Tech Square, the Crum & Forster Building is an historic building that was completed in 1927. Originally built as the headquarters for Crum & Forster, an insurance house founded in 1896, the building was designed by Ed Ivey and Lewis "Buck" Crook, both Georgia Tech graduates. The building was purchased by the Georgia Institute of Technology in 2007, with the intention to demolish the building to make space for surface parking. However, the Atlanta Preservation Center intervened and headed a preservation campaign which led to the building being granted landmark status by the City Council of Atlanta in 2009. Ultimately, Georgia Tech agreed to preserve the main façade of the building while demolishing approximately two-thirds of the building to make space for the Coda Building. This demolition was carried out in 2013. There are currently plans for the Crum & Forster Building to be used for retail space following the construction of the Coda Building.

=== Ferst Center for the Arts ===
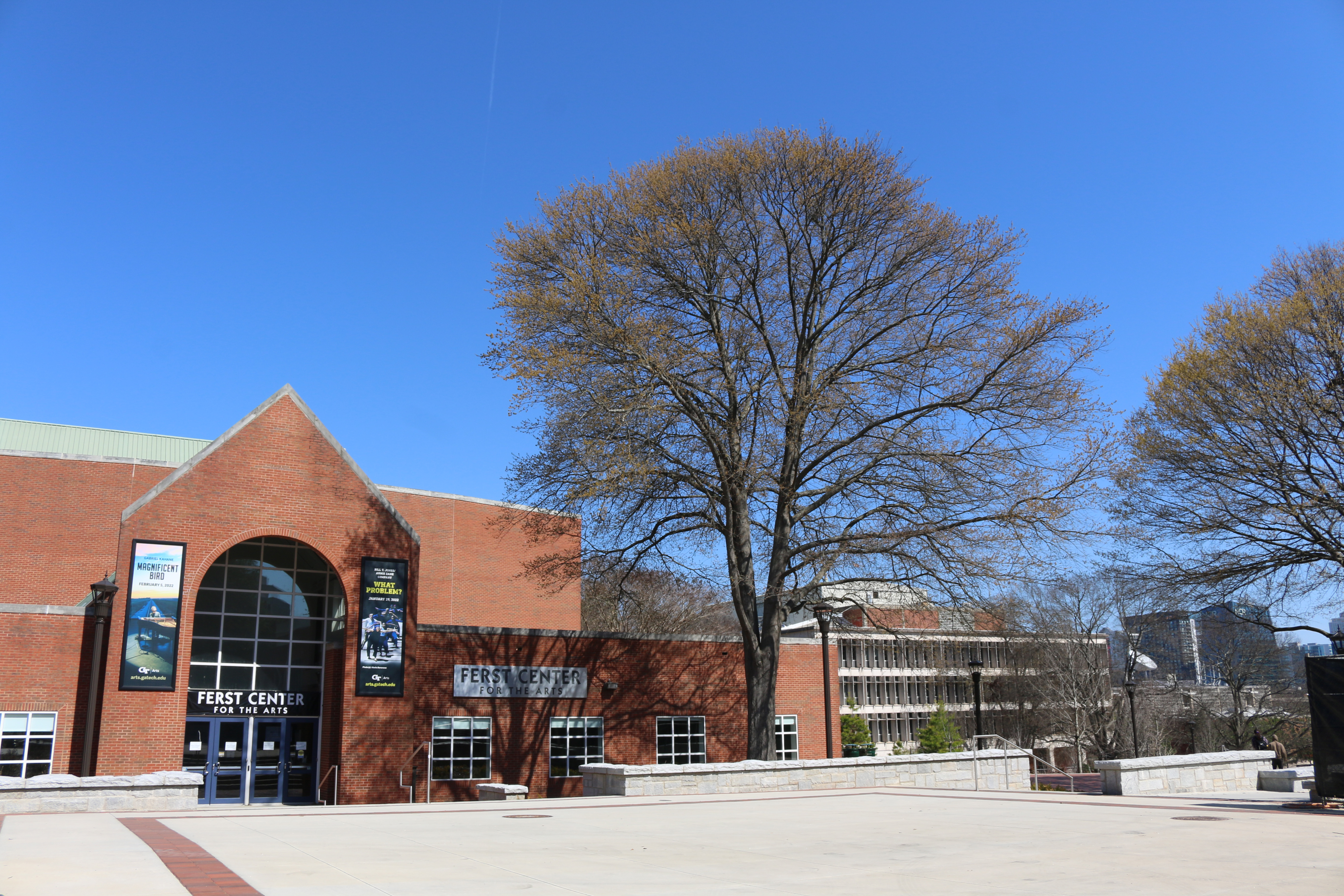
The Ferst Center for the Arts (left) in 2022

The Ferst Center for the Arts is Georgia Tech's theater and arts center and is adjacent to DramaTech, the student-run theater. It contains a 950-seat auditorium that features a proscenium stage, orchestra pit, and theatrical lighting and sound systems. The center opened in April 1992 with the name Georgia Tech Theatre for the Arts. In 2010, it was renamed in honor of Robert H. Ferst, a Georgia Tech alumnus, following a $1 million donation by his widow, Jeanne Rolfe Ferst. On October 13, 1992, shortly after its opening, it served as the venue for the vice presidential debate between Al Gore, Dan Quayle, and James Stockdale.

=== Student Center ===
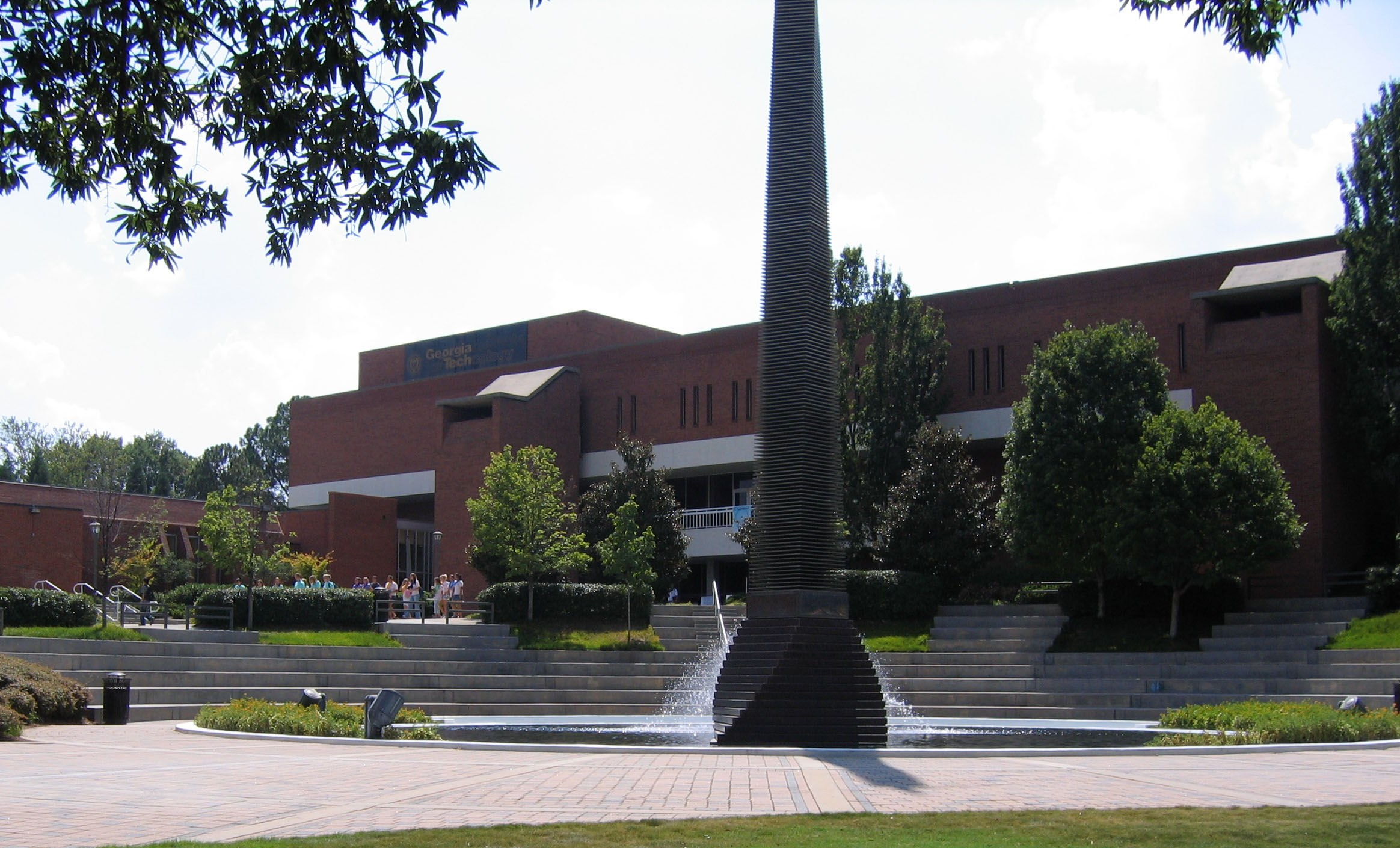
Fred B. Wenn Building, with the Kessler Campanile in the foreground

Located on Central Campus, the Georgia Tech Student Center is dedicated to recreation and socialization for Georgia Tech students. Constructed in 1970, the building initially covered about 100,000 square feet and contained, among other features, a post office, cafeteria, ballroom, and one of the only on-campus bowling alleys in the Southeast. The bowling alley is now a part of Tech Rec, a part of the Student Center which also houses multiple billiards tables, ping pong tables, and video game consoles. This initial portion was known as the Fred B. Wenn Building. In 2010, Under the Couch moved from its previous location on West Campus to its current location on the second floor of the Wenn building.

In 2004, the student center expanded with the addition of a new building, the Penny and Roe Stamps Student Center Commons, which included additional lounge areas, meeting spaces, and the offices of the Student Government Association. In 2010, a food court was added to the Stamps building.

In Summer 2020 the student center underwent an extensive renovation which was completed in 2022. This new renovation nearly doubled the size of the student center and included a third story addition to the stamps commons, offices for both the Black Student Organizations and the LGBTQIA Resource Center, and dedicated space for graduate students. Post-renovation, the building was renamed to the John Lewis Student Center in memory of U.S. Representative John Lewis.

=== Whitehead Building (Student Health Center) ===
Located next to the CRC on West Campus is the 40,000 square foot Joseph Brown Whitehead Building, which houses the Stamps Health Services, the on-campus health clinic. The building opened in 2003 and is the third on-campus health clinic to carry the Joseph Brown Whitehead name. The first such building (renamed the Chapin Building) remains on campus and is a part of Georgia Tech's Historic District. The building's namesake, Joseph Brown Whitehead, was an early bottler of Coca-Cola whose wife, Lettie Pate Whitehead, made significant donations to the Institution.

== Former buildings ==
=== Woodruff Dining Hall ===
The George and Irene Woodruff Dining Hall, colloquially referred to as Woody's, was the sole dining hall of West Campus from its opening in 1985 until its closure in 2017. A buffet-style dining hall similar to those on East Campus, the hall was located between Woodruff North and Woodruff South and served as a connector for the two buildings. Its closing in 2017 coincided with the opening of West Village (its de facto successor) and the closing of West Campus Market, a small market located in the Curran Street Parking Deck next to a Wing Zone.

== Notable landmarks and locations ==
=== Kessler Campanile ===
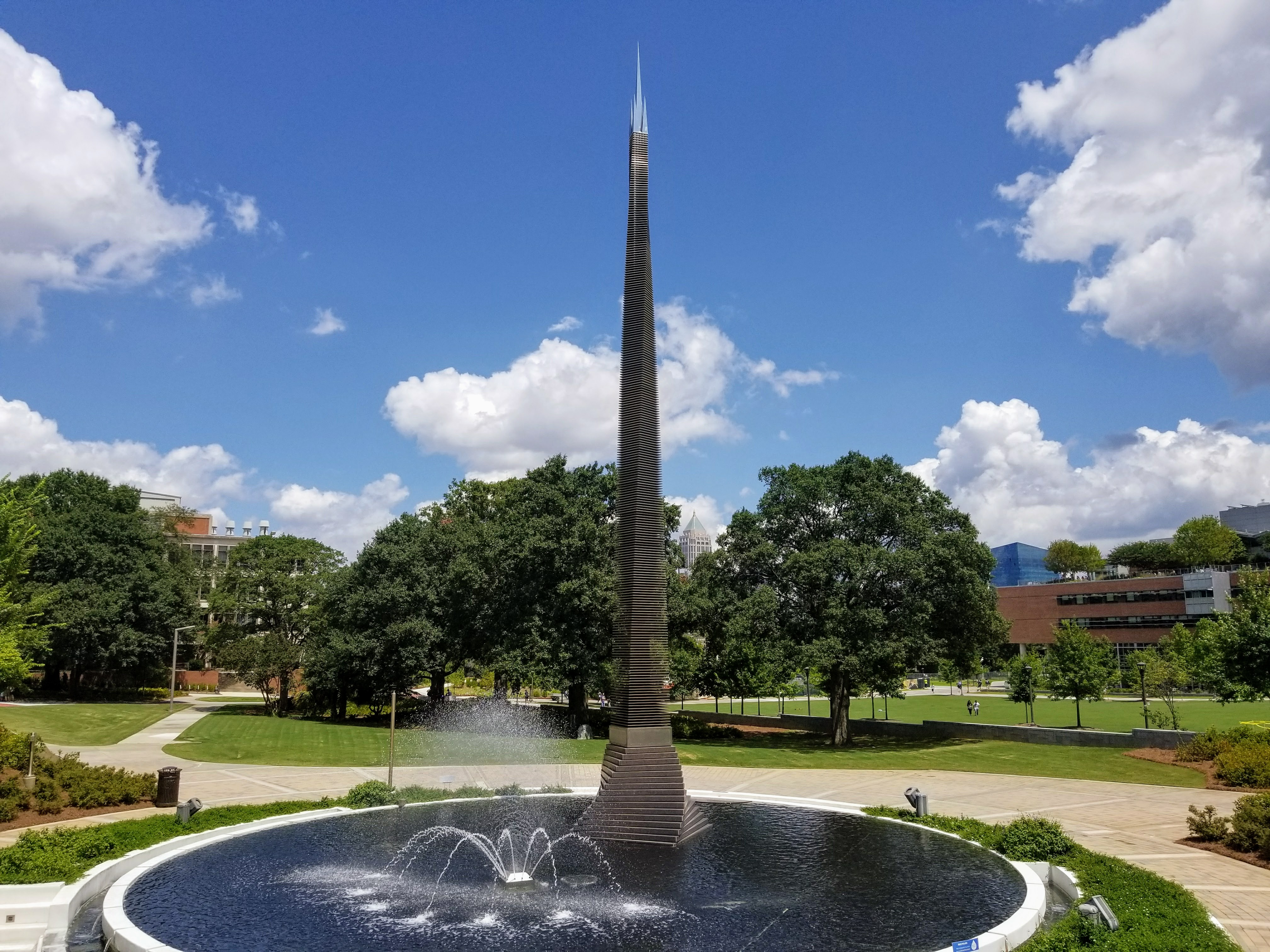
Kessler Campanile

The Kessler Campanile is an 80-foot-tall (24 m) campanile located on Central Campus. The structure and its surrounding amphitheater can be found adjacent to the Student Center at the end of Tech Walkway. The steel obelisk rises from a shallow pool (which includes a small fountain) and is surrounded by a 300-seat pavilion. It was named after Tech alum Richard C. Kessler and originally built for the 1996 Olympic Games.

=== Burger Bowl ===
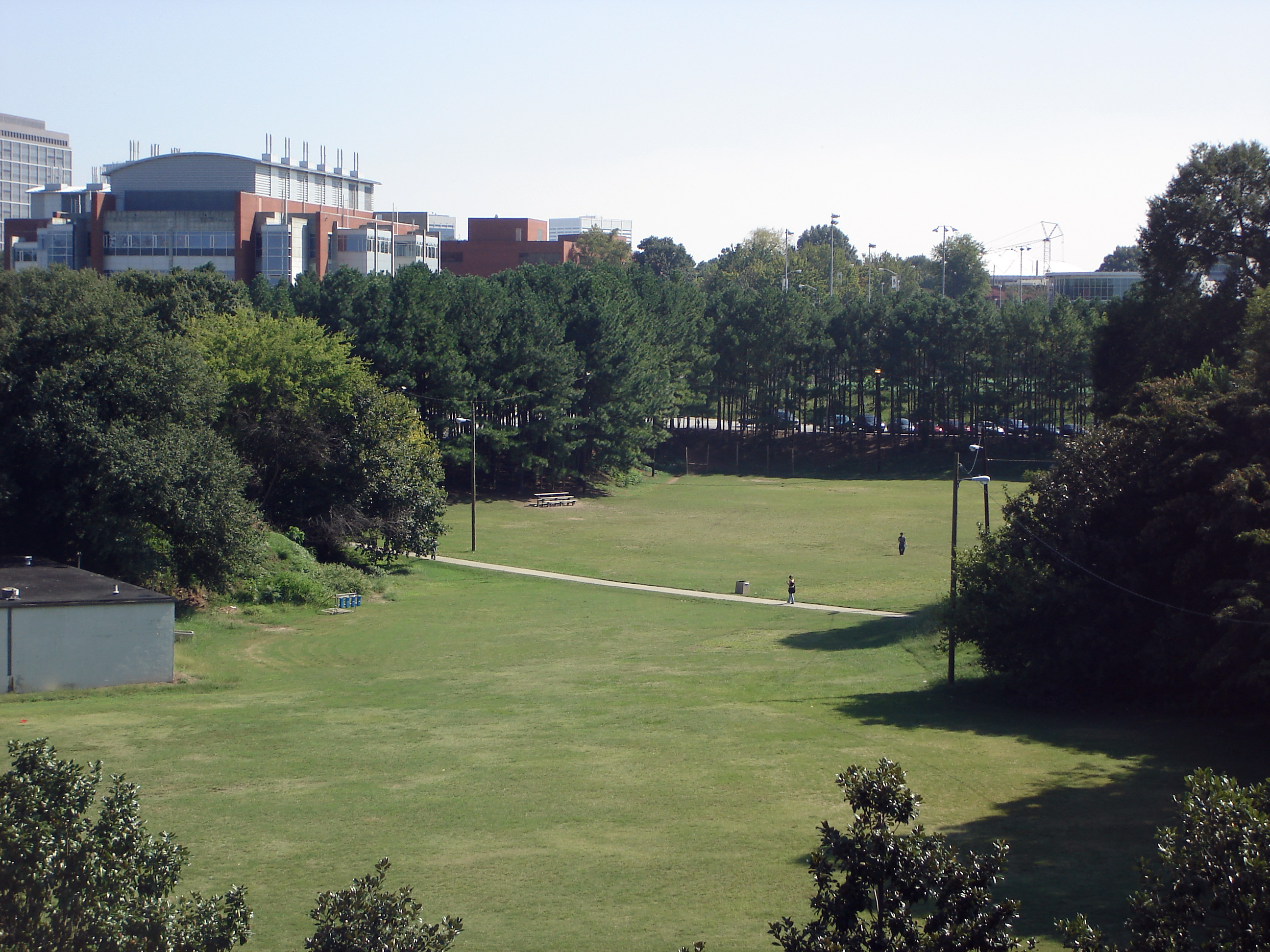
Burger Bowl, as seen from Crecine Apartments

Burger Bowl is an athletic field located on West Campus at the intersection of Hemphill Avenue and Ferst Drive. It is adjacent to the CRC Roe Stamps Fields and located behind the Fitten, Freeman, and Montag residence halls. The field's peculiar name comes from a since-closed Burger King located across the street from the field. The bowl is often used for intramural sports and is currently the home venue for the Georgia Tech Rugby team.

=== The Hill (Freshman Hill) ===
The Hill refers to the area comprising the Historic District and part of East Campus. Many of the initial buildings, such as Tech Tower, were built on an actual hill, and the name continues to refer to both the area and the Georgia Tech administration as a whole. Due to the location of East Campus residence halls at the base of the hill, the term Freshman Hill has been applied to the steep incline of Bobby Dodd Way, a road that many freshmen must walk to get to academic buildings on the other side of the hill.

=== Tech Green ===
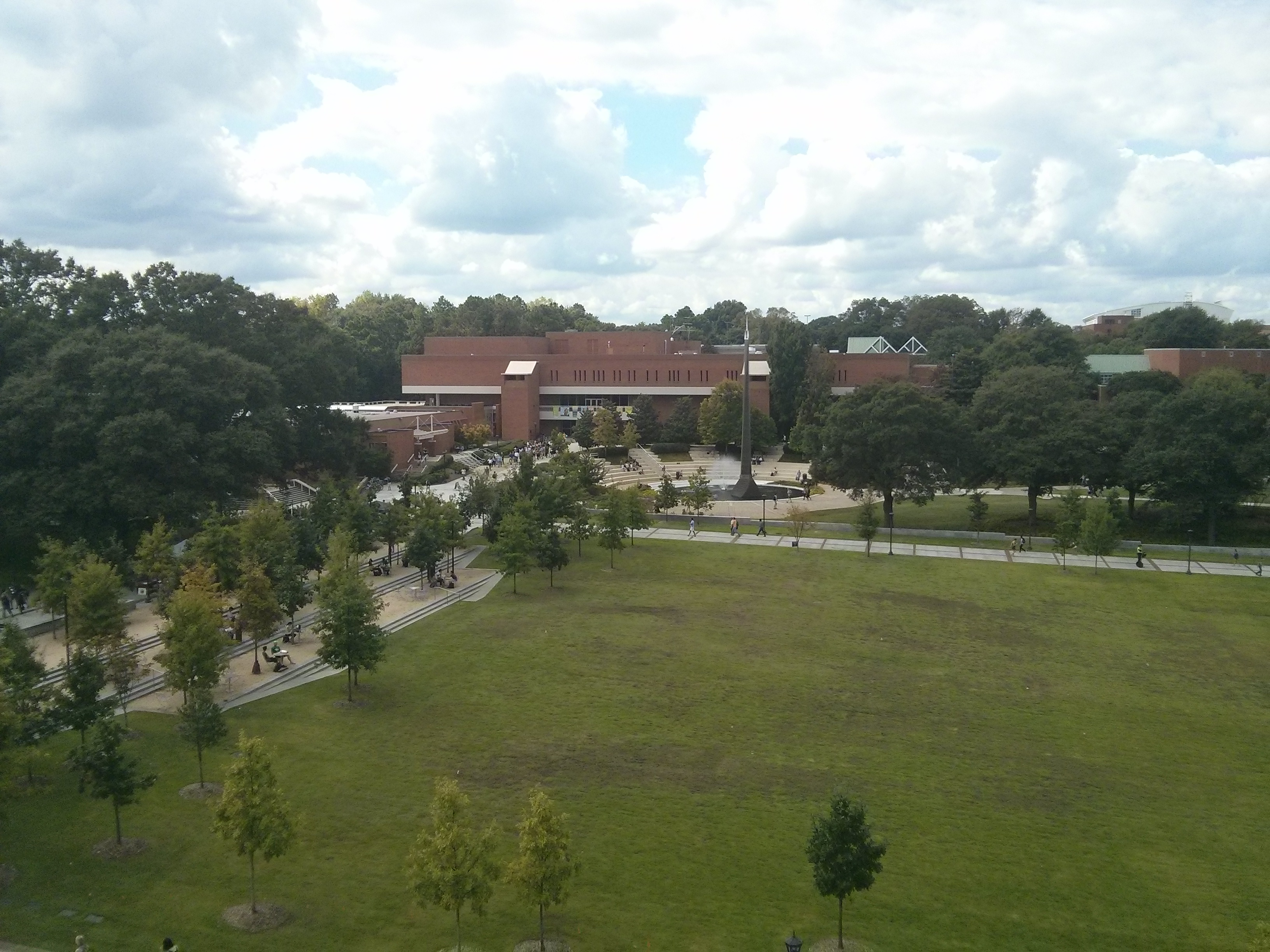
Tech Green as viewed from Clough Commons. The Student Center and Kessler Campanile can be seen in the background, with Tech Walkway visible to the left.

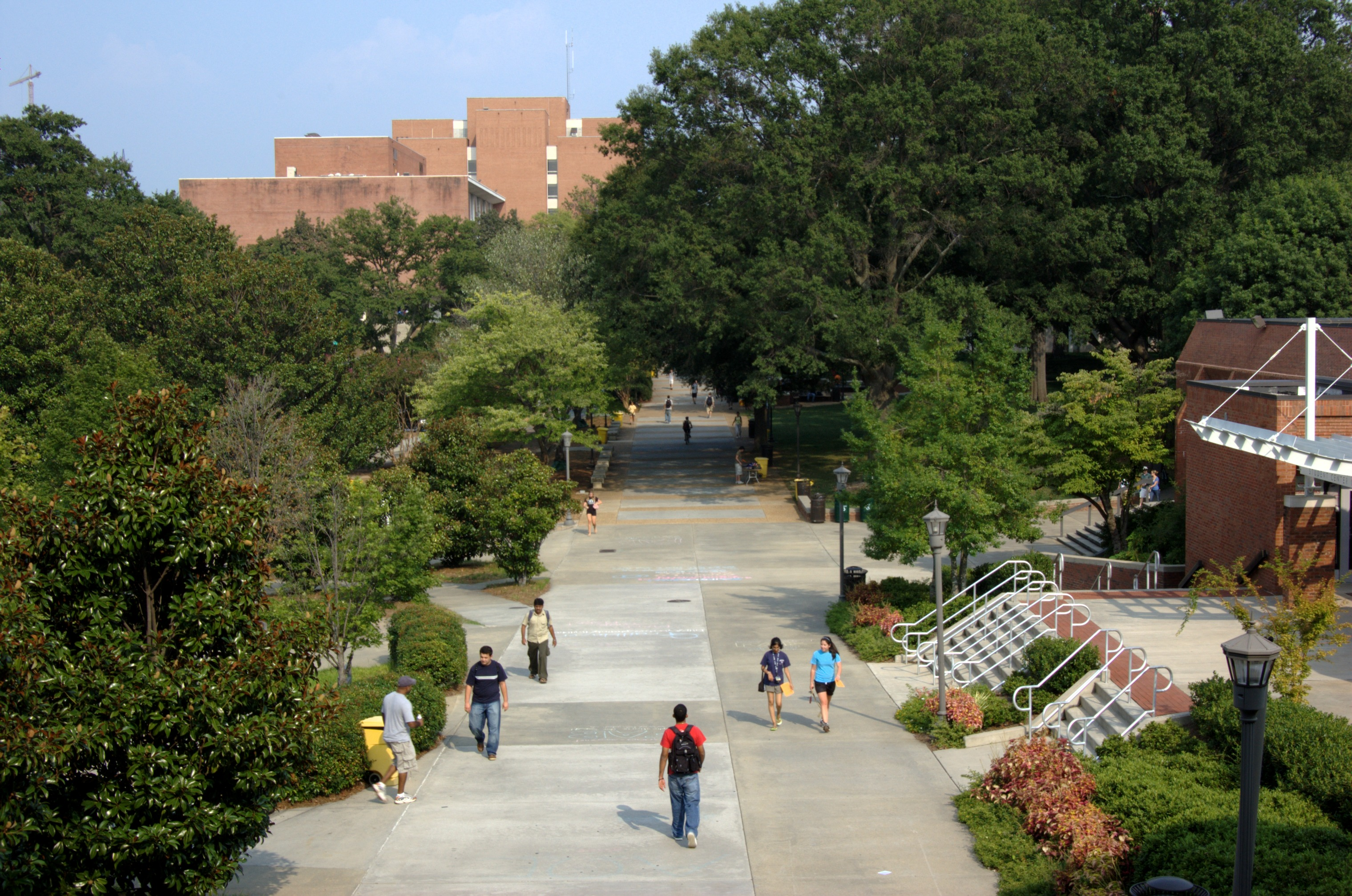
Tech Walkway as viewed from the Student Center, with the Library in the background.

Tech Green is a 3.2 acre green space located on Central Campus, bordered by Clough Commons to the east and Tech Walkway to the south. The Student Center and Kessler Campanile are located to the southwest of the space. Directly underneath Tech Green lies a 1.4 million gallon cistern system. According to the Georgia Tech Arboretum, as of 2016 there were 949 trees located on Tech Green, with a canopy cover of over 33,000 square feet. Tech Walkway, formerly known as and often still referred to as Skiles Walkway, cuts through a part of Tech Green and connects the Student Center to several academic buildings, such as the CULC and Library. The walkway serves as a popular venue for canvassers of various student groups.

== Transportation ==
Georgia Tech's main campus is accessible via car using the Downtown Connector. The campus is also accessible via Midtown station and North Avenue station on the MARTA rail system. Tech operates its own bus system known as the Stinger.
