= Wisconsin's Racine County 1st Assembly district =

Former American legislative district

Wisconsin's Racine County 1st State Assembly district
- Obsolete
- Notes: 1848–1888; 1892–1972

Wisconsin's Racine County 1st Assembly district was a district in the Wisconsin State Assembly for most of the history of the state of Wisconsin, up to the legislative redistricting reforms of 1972 which created the current numbered districts. Located in southeast Wisconsin, the district was one of the 66 original Assembly districts defined in Article XIV of the Constitution of Wisconsin. The Constitution originally allocated five districts for Racine County—which at that time also comprised all of what is now Kenosha County; this district was always confined to the eastern quarter of Racine County, including all or part of the city of Racine.

The district was in use for 120 of the first 124 years of Wisconsin's history, from 1848 to 1888, then again from 1892 to 1972.

== List of representatives ==
List of representatives from the Racine County 1st district
Member	Party	Residence	Term start	Term end	Leg.
District created
David McDonald	Dem.	Racine	June 5, 1848	January 1, 1849	1st
Marshall Strong	F.S.	Racine	January 1, 1849	January 7, 1850	2nd
Horace Chapman	F.S.	Racine	January 7, 1850	January 6, 1851	3rd
William L. Utley	F.S.	Racine	January 6, 1851	January 3, 1853	4th 5th
Horace T. Sanders	Dem.	Racine	January 3, 1853	January 2, 1854	6th
Charles S. Wright	Dem.	Racine	January 2, 1854	January 1, 1855	7th
Thomas Falvey	Dem.	Racine	January 1, 1855	January 5, 1857	8th 9th
Llewelyn Evans	Rep.	Racine	January 5, 1857	January 4, 1858	10th
Hermon Warner	Dem.	Racine	January 4, 1858	January 3, 1859	11th
William P. Lyon	Rep.	Racine	January 3, 1859	January 7, 1861	12th 13th
Gilbert Knapp	Rep.	Racine	January 7, 1861	January 6, 1862	14th
Calvin H. Upham	Rep.	Racine	January 6, 1862	January 1, 1863	15th
Horatio T. Taylor	Rep.	Racine	January 1, 1863	January 4, 1864	16th
George C. Northrop	Union	Racine	January 4, 1864	January 2, 1865	17th
John Vaughan	Union	Racine	January 2, 1865	January 1, 1866	18th
James O. Bartlett	Union	Racine	January 1, 1866	January 7, 1867	19th
Charles E. Dyer	Union	Racine	January 7, 1867	January 4, 1869	20th 21st
Albert L. Phillips	Rep.	Racine	January 4, 1869	January 2, 1871	22nd 23rd
Lucius S. Blake	Rep.	Racine	January 2, 1871	January 1, 1872	24th
Richard B. Bates	Dem.	Racine	January 1, 1872	January 6, 1873	25th
John Elkins	Rep.	Racine	January 6, 1873	January 5, 1874	26th
Charles Frederick Bliss	Dem.	Racine	January 5, 1874	January 3, 1876	27th 28th
Norton J. Field	Rep.	Racine	January 3, 1876	January 7, 1878	29th 30th
Charles Jonas	Dem.	Racine	January 7, 1878	January 6, 1879	31st
Norton J. Field	Rep.	Racine	January 6, 1879	January 5, 1880	32nd
William P. Packard	Dem.	Racine	January 5, 1880	January 3, 1881	33rd
Norton J. Field	Rep.	Racine	January 3, 1881	January 2, 1882	34th
Richard P. Howell	Rep.	Racine	January 2, 1882	January 1, 1883	35th
William P. Packard	Dem.	Racine	January 1, 1883	January 5, 1885	36th
Louis Christian Klein	Rep.	Racine	January 5, 1885	January 3, 1887	37th
Edward Alden Egery	Dem.	Racine	January 3, 1887	January 7, 1889	38th
District abolished by 1887 Wisconsin Act 461; Racine County was consolidated as a single-county Assembly district
District re-established by 1892 Wisconsin Special Session 2 Act 1
Peter Nelson	Rep.	Racine	January 2, 1893	January 7, 1895	41st
Charles M. Hambright	Rep.	Racine	January 7, 1895	January 4, 1897	42nd
William Turnor Lewis	Rep.	Racine	January 4, 1897	January 2, 1899	43rd
John C. Wagner	Rep.	Racine	January 2, 1899	January 7, 1901	44th
John W. Owen	Rep.	Racine	January 7, 1901	January 5, 1903	45th
John Dixon	Rep.	Racine	January 5, 1903	January 2, 1905	46th
William H. Bell	Rep.	Racine	January 2, 1905	January 4, 1909	47th 48th
Wallace Ingalls	Rep.	Racine	January 4, 1909	January 2, 1911	49th
William H. Bell	Rep.	Racine	January 2, 1911	January 6, 1913	50th
Charles H. Everett	Rep.	Racine	January 6, 1913	January 4, 1915	51st
John Dixon	Rep.	Racine	January 4, 1915	January 6, 1919	52nd 53rd
Robert Mutter	Rep.	Racine	January 6, 1919	January 3, 1921	54th
Wallace Ingalls	Rep.	Racine	January 3, 1921	January 1, 1923	55th
W. Grant Nelson	Rep.	Racine	January 1, 1923	January 5, 1925	56th
Wallace Ingalls	Rep.	Racine	January 5, 1925	January 5, 1931	57th 58th 59th
John L. Sieb	Rep.	Racine	January 5, 1931	January 2, 1933	60th
Joseph Clancy	Rep.	Racine	January 2, 1933	January 7, 1935	61st
Joseph Clancy	Prog.	Racine	January 7, 1935	January 6, 1941	62nd 63rd 64th
Thomas P. Corbett	Rep.	Racine	January 6, 1941	January 4, 1943	65th
Carl C. Christensen	Rep.	Racine	January 4, 1943	January 3, 1949	66th 67th 68th
Harold Gade	Dem.	Racine	January 3, 1949	January 5, 1953	69th 70th
William C. Giese	Dem.	Racine	January 5, 1953	January 3, 1955	71st
Earl W. Warren	Dem.	Racine	January 3, 1955	January 4, 1971	72nd 73rd 74th 75th 76th 77th 78th 79th
R. Michael Ferrall	Dem.	Racine	January 4, 1971	January 1, 1973	80th
District abolished by 1971 Wisconsin Act 304; Racine County was divided between the 43rd, 61st, 62nd, 63rd, and 66th Assembly districts The Racine County 1st district did not have a close analogue in the new map
