= Isaac Bishop =

Isaac Bishop may refer to:

- Isaac T. Bishop (1844–1920), member of the Wisconsin State Senate
- Isaac W. Bishop (c. 1804–?), American lawyer and politician from New York
