= Charles Jonas (Wisconsin politician) =

Czech-American journalist, politician and diplomat (1840–1896)

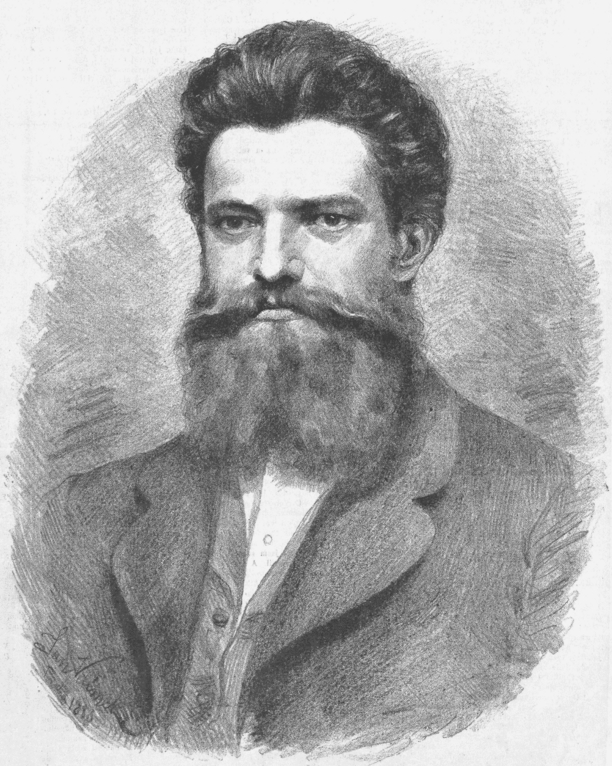

16th Lieutenant Governor of Wisconsin
- In office January 5, 1891 – April 4, 1894
- Governor: George Wilbur Peck
- Preceded by: George Washington Ryland
- Succeeded by: Emil Baensch

Member of the Wisconsin Senate from the 3rd district
- In office January 1, 1883 – November 17, 1886
- Preceded by: Albert L. Phillips
- Succeeded by: Henry Allen Cooper

Member of the Wisconsin State Assembly from the Racine 1st district
- In office January 7, 1878 – January 6, 1879
- Preceded by: Norton J. Field
- Succeeded by: Norton J. Field

Personal details
- Born: Karel Jonáš; 24 October 1840 Malešov, Bohemia, Austrian Empire
- Died: 15 January 1896 (aged 55) Krefeld, German Empire
- Resting place: Olšany Cemetery, Prague
- Party: Democratic; Greenback (1878)
- Spouse: Christine Korizek (died 1923)
- Children: 4
- Education: Prague Polytechnical Institute

Charles Jonas (born Karel Jonáš; October 24, 1840 – January 15, 1896) was a Czech American journalist, linguist, and political activist. He was the 16th lieutenant governor of Wisconsin and served in the Wisconsin Legislature, representing Racine County. Later in life, he was an American consul general to Austria-Hungary, and the Russian and German empires.

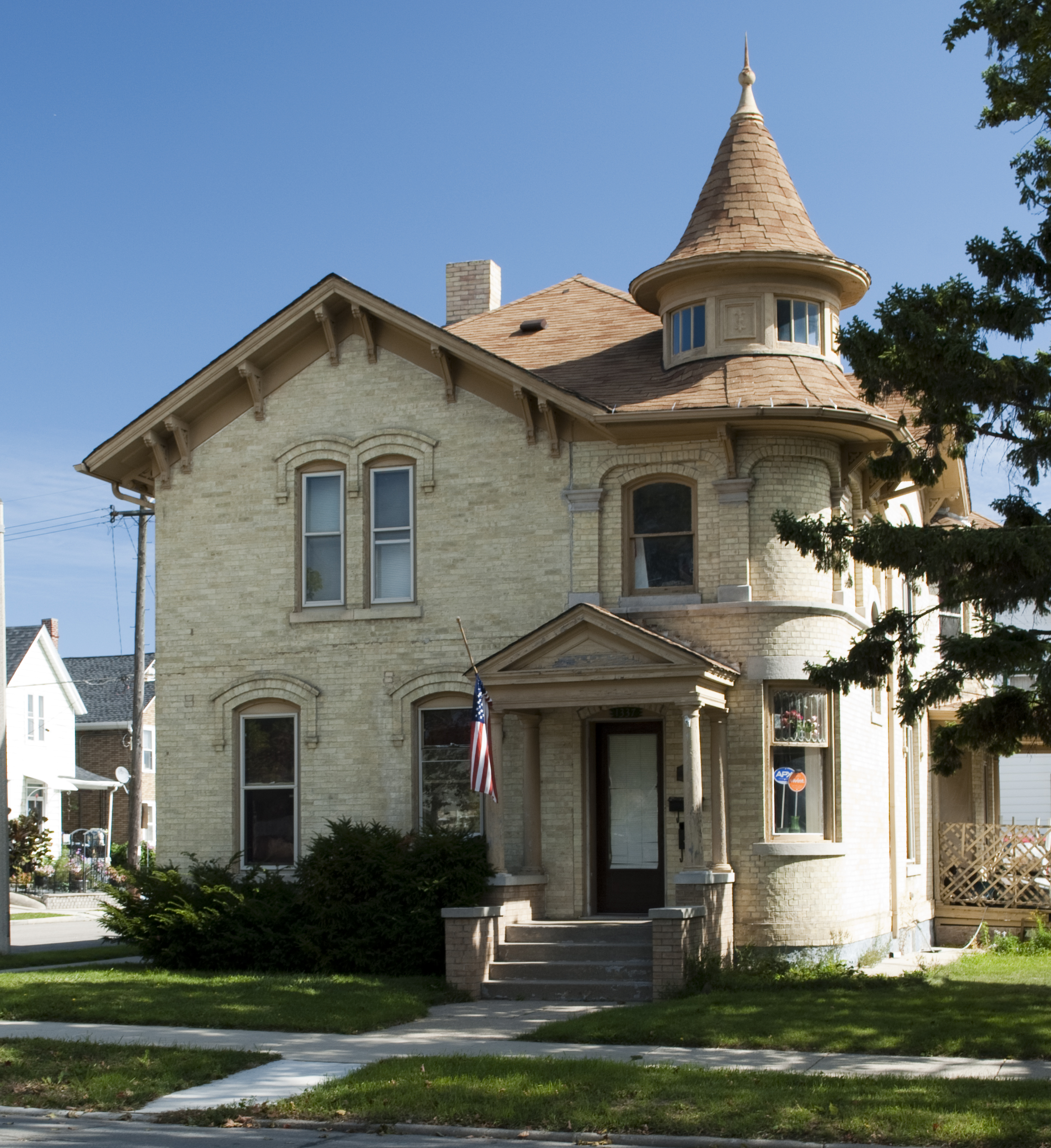
Karel Jonas House in Racine, Wisconsin

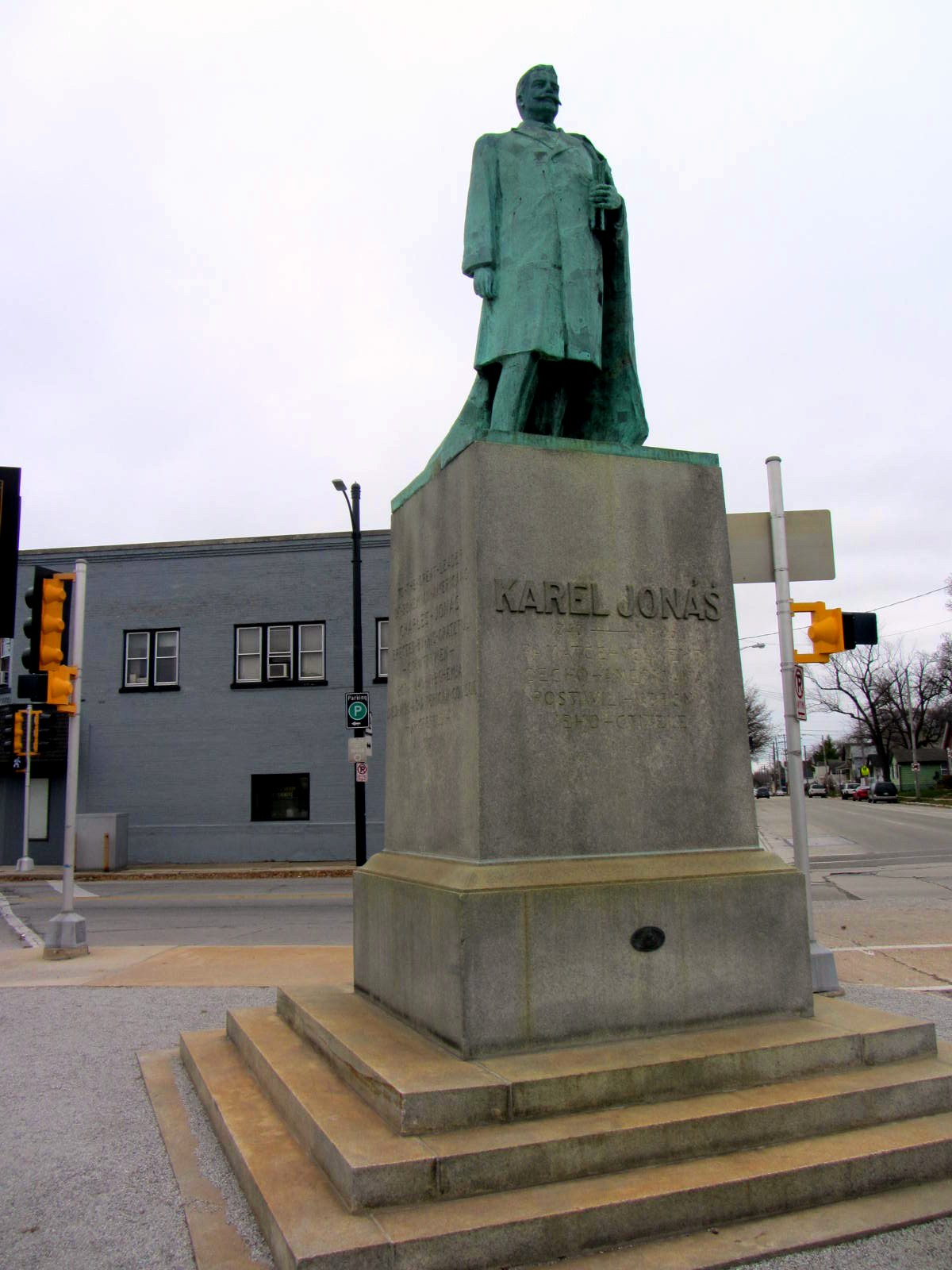
Charles Jonas statue in Racine, Wisconsin

Although in 1919 the United States Department of State informed the author Thomas Čapek that Jonas died of heart failure, recent scholarship has determined that Jonas shot himself. His former home in Racine, Wisconsin, the Karel Jonas House, is now listed in the National Register of Historic Places. It is located at 1337 North Erie Street.

== Background ==
Karel Jonáš was born on 24 October 1840 in Malešov house 32 to Ignác Jonáš and Terezie Rubínová. He studied at what was then the Bohemian School of Science and Polytechnic Institute in Prague, as well as attending lectures at Charles University in Prague. A strong Czech nationalist and friend of Vojtěch Náprstek, he fled Bohemia in 1860 after clashes with the authorities, moving via Bremen to London, where he continued to work as a journalist. In March 1863 he emigrated to Racine, Wisconsin, just south of Milwaukee (where Náprstek had been the first Czech to publish a periodical in the United States); there he edited and published the Czech language newspaper Slavie.

== Elective office and consular service ==
Jonas was skeptical of Abraham Lincoln and the policies of the Republican Party (which he saw as too centralist), and he gradually came to be affiliated with the Democrats. He was appointed to the Board of Managers of the Wisconsin Industrial School for Boys (a reform school) for 1874–1877, serving only through 1875.

He was elected an alderman for the City of Racine, serving from 1876 to 1883, and would serve as president of the Common Council of Racine for 1878–79.

He was elected as a Democratic member of the Wisconsin State Assembly in 1877 to represent the 1st Racine County district (the City of Racine) (incumbent Republican Norton J. Field was not a candidate for re-election), with 1229 votes to 760 for Republican Edward Gillen; he was assigned to the standing committees on the judiciary and on education. He was not a candidate for re-election in 1878, choosing instead to run on the Greenback Party ticket for the Wisconsin Senate's Third District (Racine County), losing to Republican William Everett Chipman by 3206 to 2177 (there was no Democratic candidate in the race, and some candidates that year ran as Democrats and Greenbackers simultaneously). He was succeeded in the Assembly by Field.

He ran again for the Senate in 1882 as a Democrat (to succeed Republican Albert L. Phillips, who was not a candidate for re-election), winning this time with 3213 votes to 2494 for Republican William T. Lewis; and was assigned to the committees on education and on enrolled bills. He did not run for re-election in 1886, and was succeeded by Republican Henry Allen Cooper.

On November 17, 1886, Jonas was appointed U. S. Consul at Prague by President Grover Cleveland, which position he held until July 16, 1889.

In 1890 he was elected 16th Lieutenant Governor of Wisconsin with a plurality of 34,974 in a four-way race, well ahead of his running mate, Milwaukee mayor George Wilbur Peck. He would serve in that office from 1891 until 1894, when he resigned to become the U.S. consul in Saint Petersburg, Russian Empire; in 1896, he was transferred to Crefeld, German Empire, where he died that same year.

Although in 1919 the Department of State informed author Thomas Čapek that Jonas died of heart failure, recent scholarship has determined that Jonas shot himself. After his death, Jonas was buried in Prague's Olšany Cemetery.

== Sources ==
- "Wisconsin Constitutional Officers; Lieutenant Governors" (PDF). State of Wisconsin Blue Book 2005–2006. Wisconsin Legislative Reference Bureau. July 2005. p. 31. Archived from the original (PDF) on October 25, 2007.
- "Charles Jonas". Office of the Lieutenant Governor. Archived from the original on May 28, 2010.

== Electoral history ==
=== Wisconsin Assembly (1877) ===
Wisconsin Assembly, Racine 1st District Election, 1877
Party	Candidate	Votes	%	±%
General Election, November 6, 1877
Democratic	Charles Jonas	1,229	61.79%	
Republican	Edward Gillen	760	38.21%	
Plurality		469	23.58%	
Total votes		1,989	100.0%	
Democratic gain from Republican				

=== Wisconsin Senate (1878) ===
Wisconsin Senate, 3rd District Election, 1878
Party	Candidate	Votes	%	±%
General Election, November 5, 1878
Republican	William Everett Chipman	3,206	59.56%	+4.30%
Greenback	Charles Jonas	2,177	40.44%	
Plurality		1,029	19.12%	+8.61%
Total votes		5,383	100.0%	-16.34%
Republican hold				

=== Wisconsin Senate (1882) ===
Wisconsin Senate, 3rd District Election, 1882
Party	Candidate	Votes	%	±%
General Election, November 7, 1882
Democratic	Charles Jonas	3,213	56.30%	+12.81%
Republican	William T. Lewis	2,494	43.70%	−11.98%
Plurality		719	12.60%	+0.40%
Total votes		5,707	100.0%	-17.13%
Democratic gain from Republican				

=== Wisconsin Lieutenant Governor (1890, 1892) ===
Wisconsin Lieutenant Gubernatorial Election, 1890
Party	Candidate	Votes	%	±%
General Election, November 4, 1890
Democratic	Charles Jonas	159,710	52.40%	+8.75%
Republican	Joseph B. Treat	124,746	40.92%	−8.85%
Prohibition	William R. Nethercut	13,361	4.38%	+0.28%
Labor	Nelson E. Allen	7,000	2.30%	−0.18%
Plurality		34,964	11.47%	+5.34%
Total votes		304,817	100.0%	-14.03%
Democratic gain from Republican				

Wisconsin Lieutenant Gubernatorial Election, 1892
Party	Candidate	Votes	%	±%
General Election, November 8, 1892
Democratic	Charles Jonas (incumbent)	176,860	47.80%	−4.59%
Republican	John C. Koch	170,097	45.98%	+5.05%
Prohibition	Gilbert Shepard	13,122	3.55%	−0.84%
Populist	Martin Pattison	9,885	2.67%	
Plurality		6,763	1.83%	-9.64%
Total votes		369,964	100.0%	+21.37%
Democratic hold				

Party political offices
Preceded by Andrew Kull	Democratic nominee for Lieutenant Governor of Wisconsin; 1890, 1892	Succeeded by A. J. Schmitz
Wisconsin State Assembly
Preceded by Norton J. Field	Member of the Wisconsin State Assembly from the Racine 1st district January 7, 1878 – January 6, 1879	Succeeded by Norton J. Field
Wisconsin Senate
Preceded by Albert L. Phillips	Member of the Wisconsin Senate from the 3rd district January 1, 1883 – January 3, 1887	Succeeded by Henry Allen Cooper
Political offices
Preceded by George Washington Ryland	Lieutenant Governor of Wisconsin; January 5, 1891 – April 4, 1894	Succeeded by Emil Baensch
