= Louis Christian Klein =

American politician (1832–1900)

Member of the Wisconsin State Assembly from the Racine 1st district
- In office January 5, 1885 – January 3, 1887
- Preceded by: William P. Packard
- Succeeded by: Edward Alden Egery

Personal details
- Born: October 13, 1832 Oberstein, Birkenfeld, Grand Duchy of Oldenburg
- Died: June 25, 1900 (aged 67) Racine, Wisconsin, U.S.
- Cause of death: Liver disease
- Resting place: Mound Cemetery, Racine, Wisconsin
- Party: Republican
- Spouse: Mary Jane Bliss (before 1900)
- Children: Louis F. Klein^{(died 1904)}; Leona (Birkhaeuser)

Louis Christian Klein (October 13, 1832 – June 25, 1900) was an American businessman, and Wisconsin pioneer. He was a member of the Wisconsin State Assembly, representing the city of Racine in the 1885 session. He was considered the father of the Racine County Insane Asylum.

== Biography ==
Louis C. Klein was born in October 1832 in the town of Oberstein, in the principality of Birkenfeld, in the area that is now the Rhineland-Palatinate region of Germany. When he was a child, his parents moved to France, where he and his siblings were educated. After his father's death, he emigrated to the United States with his mother, brother, and sister, landing first at New Orleans. His mother purchased a hotel and boarding house in Louisville, Kentucky, around 1850, which she operated for several years, and continued to own until it was destroyed in riots during Reconstruction. They came to Racine, Wisconsin, in 1855.

In Racine, Louis established a merchant business on Main Street, dealing in liquor, tobacco, toys, and other goods imported from Europe. He later took on his brother, Frederick, as a partner, renaming the business "Klein & Brother". He sold out his share of the business to his brother in 1872. His success in the merchant business enabled him to buy significant real estate in Racine.

He was a member of the Racine city council in 1860, 1875, and 1876, and also served on the Racine County board of supervisors in 1875, 1876, and 1888. He also served for several years on the Racine board of education.

In 1884, he was elected to the Wisconsin State Assembly, running on the Republican Party ticket. He defeated the Democratic incumbent, William P. Packard, and represented Racine County's first Assembly district, which then comprised just the city of Racine. He ran for re-election in 1886, but was defeated by Edward Alden Egery.

After leaving the Assembly, he was involved in the effort to establish a new insane asylum in Racine County. He helped move the proposal through the Racine County board, and was then selected to serve on the Asylum board of trustees. The Racine County Insane Asylum opened in 1889, and Klein remained involved in the maintenance of the organization for the rest of his life.

== Personal life and family ==
Louis C. Klein was the eldest of three children born to Louis Christian Klein and his wife Theresia. His brother, Frederick W. Klein, ran for mayor of Racine in 1901, but was defeated by the incumbent mayor, Michael Higgins.

Louis Klein married Mary Jane Bliss, the daughter of Charles Frederick Bliss, another German American immigrant and Racine pioneer. They had two children together. Their daughter, Leona, married Theodore K. Birkhaeuser, a Milwaukee dentist who went on to serve as a major in the United States Volunteers during the Philippine–American War. Their son, Louis, was also a successful businessman in Racine, but he died just four years after his father, due to Appendicitis.

== Electoral history ==
=== Wisconsin Assembly (1884, 1886) ===
Wisconsin Assembly, Racine 1st District Election, 1884
Party	Candidate	Votes	%	±%
General Election, November 8, 1884
Republican	Louis C. Klein	2,358	53.52%	+13.13%
Democratic	William P. Packard (incumbent)	1,935	43.92%	−10.99%
Prohibition	John F. Bickel	113	2.56%	−2.14%
Plurality		423	9.60%	-4.91%
Total votes		4,406	100.0%	+43.05%
Republican gain from Democratic				

Wisconsin Assembly, Racine 1st District Election, 1886
Party	Candidate	Votes	%	±%
General Election, November 2, 1886
Democratic	Edward Alden Egery	1,808	54.39%	+10.47%
Republican	Louis C. Klein (incumbent)	1,354	40.73%	−12.78%
Prohibition	Eugene Leach	162	4.87%	+2.31%
Plurality		454	13.66%	+4.06%
Total votes		3,324	100.0%	-24.56%
Democratic gain from Republican				

Wisconsin State Assembly
Preceded by William P. Packard	Member of the Wisconsin State Assembly from the Racine 1st district January 5, 1885 – January 3, 1887	Succeeded by Edward Alden Egery
