= Charles Bliss =

Charles Bliss may refer to:

- Charles K. Bliss (1897–1985), Austrian-Australian chemical engineer and semiotician
- Charles Frederick Bliss (1817–1894), German American immigrant, baker, pioneer and politician
