= William H. Bell (Wisconsin politician) =

American politician (1863–1937)

Member of the Wisconsin State Assembly from the Racine 1st district
- In office January 2, 1911 – January 6, 1913
- Preceded by: Wallace Ingalls
- Succeeded by: Charles H. Everett
- In office January 2, 1905 – January 4, 1909
- Preceded by: John Dixon
- Succeeded by: Wallace Ingalls

Personal details
- Born: August 8, 1863 Liverpool, England, UK
- Died: April 17, 1937 (aged 73) Racine, Wisconsin, U.S.
- Cause of death: Heart attack
- Resting place: Mound Cemetery, Racine
- Party: Republican
- Spouse: none
- Children: none

William Hamilton Bell (August 8, 1863 – April 17, 1937) was an English American immigrant, machinist, and Republican politician from Racine, Wisconsin. He was a member of the Wisconsin State Assembly during the 1905, 1907, and 1911 sessions, and served several years on the Racine city council.

== Early life ==
Bell was born on August 8, 1863, in Liverpool, England, to parents of Scottish ancestry. He was raised and educated in Liverpool before emigrating to the United States. He came to live in Racine, Wisconsin, in 1880.

Shortly after arriving in Racine, he was employed in a plant of the J. I. Case Company, and worked there until 1889. He then was hired as a machinist foreman at the Racine Hardware Company. After leaving that job in 1892, he worked the rest of his life in real estate.

== Career ==
His first major success in real estate was platting the "Hamilton district" of the city of Racine, just south of the Uptown business district. His success in the real estate business earned him a reputation for having a keen understanding of property values in the Racine area, and in 1901 he was appointed city public administrator for estates, serving as trustee or guardian for many Racine estates over the next 13 years.

The next year, he won his first elected office, running on the Republican Party ticket. He served as alderman for Racine's 11th ward on the Racine common council from 1902 until 1915. While serving as alderman, he was also elected president of the Manufacturers National Bank, succeeding Stephen Bull.

In 1904, Bell was the Republican nominee for Wisconsin State Assembly in Racine County's first Assembly district, which then comprised most of the city of Racine. He prevailed with 45% of the vote in the general election over Democratic, Socialist, and Prohibition opponents. He went on to win re-election in 1906 with 72% of the vote, facing only socialist and prohibition opposition.

He announced in 1908 that he would not run for re-election that year. That year, he also expanded his banking involvement as a board-appointed examiner for the Racine City Bank. After a two year hiatus from the Assembly, however, Bell sought to reclaim his seat in 1910. Wallace Ingalls, who had succeeded him in the Assembly, was mounting a primary challenge against then-congressman Henry Allen Cooper, leaving an open seat. Bell easily prevailed over his primary opponent, Charles Lange, and went on to win the general election with 66% of the vote. After this final term, Bell again declined to run for re-election.

He continued serving in city office for another several years, and served on the city police and fire commission for several years after, retiring in 1921. He was appointed to a final public office in 1932, when he served as a city jury commissioner, remaining in office until his death in 1937.

== Personal life and family ==
William Bell was one of at least two children born to John and Ellen (née Rushton) Bell. Both parents were born in Scotland. William Bell never married; his obituary identifies that he was survived by a sister and several nieces and nephews. Bell was also active in Freemasonry and served as an officer of the Belle City Lodge.

Bell died of a heart attack at his home in Racine on April 17, 1937. He was buried at Racine's historic Mound Cemetery.

== Electoral history ==
Wisconsin Assembly, Racine 1st District Election, 1904
Party	Candidate	Votes	%	±%
General Election, November 8, 1904
Republican	W. H. Bell	2,411	44.78%	−6.57%
Democratic	Charles D. Finch	1,789	33.23%	−15.42%
Socialist	M. Biddinger	1,043	19.37%	
Prohibition	S. L. Jackson	141	2.62%	
Plurality		622	11.55%	+8.85%
Total votes		5,384	100.0%	+10.99%
Republican hold				

Wisconsin Assembly, Racine 1st District Election, 1906
Party	Candidate	Votes	%	±%
General Election, November 6, 1906
Republican	W. H. Bell (incumbent)	2,156	72.37%	+27.59%
Socialist	William Somers	691	23.20%	+3.82%
Prohibition	L. H. Parks	132	4.43%	+1.81%
Plurality		1,465	49.18%	+37.62%
Total votes		2,979	100.0%	-44.67%
Republican hold				

Wisconsin Assembly, Racine 1st District Election, 1910
Party	Candidate	Votes	%	±%
Republican Primary, September 6, 1910
Republican	W. H. Bell (incumbent)	2,268	69.96%	
Republican	Charles Lange	974	30.04%	
Total votes		3,242	100.0%	
General Election, November 8, 1910
Republican	W. H. Bell (incumbent)	1,980	66.24%	+13.78%
Socialist	William Somers	687	22.98%	+11.94%
Democratic	Peter W. Galloway	322	10.77%	−25.73%
Plurality		1,293	43.26%	+27.30%
Total votes		2,989	100.0%	-45.10%
Republican hold				

Wisconsin State Assembly
Preceded by John Dixon	Member of the Wisconsin State Assembly from the Racine 1st district January 2, 1905 – January 4, 1909	Succeeded by Wallace Ingalls
Preceded by Wallace Ingalls	Member of the Wisconsin State Assembly from the Racine 1st district January 2, 1911 – January 6, 1913	Succeeded by Charles H. Everett
