= John Elkins =

19th century American politician

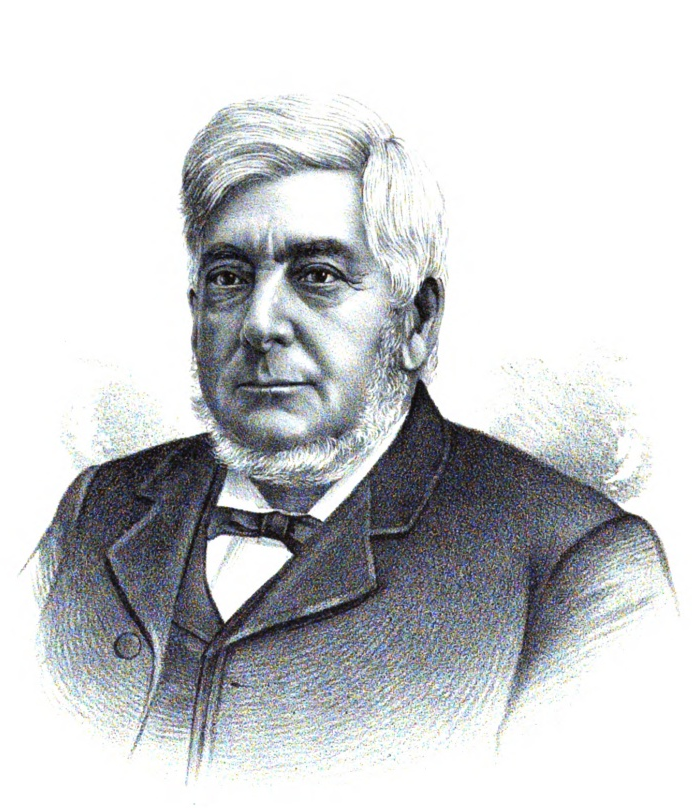
- From Portrait and Biographical Album of Racine and Kenosha Counties, Wisconsin (1892)

Member of the Wisconsin State Assembly from the Racine 1st district
- In office January 6, 1873 – January 5, 1874
- Preceded by: Richard B. Bates
- Succeeded by: Charles Frederick Bliss

Personal details
- Born: May 23, 1815 Piermont, New Hampshire, U.S.
- Died: December 13, 1898 (aged 83) Racine, Wisconsin, U.S.
- Party: Republican; Whig (before 1854)
- Spouse: Eliza Putnam (m. 1840; died 1897)
- Children: Edmund Elkins^{(died 1865)}; George Elkins^{(died age 2)}; Nancy M. (Smith)^{(b. 1846; died 1901)}; Gertrude (Beemer)^{(b. 1848; died 1919)}
- Occupation: Jeweler, watchmaker

John Elkins (May 23, 1815 – December 13, 1898) was an American jeweler, watchmaker, politician, and Wisconsin pioneer. He was a member of the Wisconsin State Assembly, representing the city of Racine in the 1873 session.

== Biography ==
John Elkins was born in Piermont, New Hampshire, on May 23, 1815. He was raised on his family's farm until age 17, when he moved to Boston, Massachusetts, and apprenticed as a jeweler. He then went to work as a journeyman jeweler for one year in Pittsburgh, Pennsylvania. In 1837, he moved to St. Louis, Missouri, and purchased a lot in the city to operate a store, but an outbreak of Cholera forced him to cancel his plans. He then moved to Rushville, Illinois, where he was able to open a shop and operate a business. At the time, there were no other jewelers within 200 miles of his shop.

After four years in Rushville, Elkins relocated to Fort Madison, Iowa, and then, in the Fall of 1843, he came to the Wisconsin Territory and settled in the area now known as Kenosha, Wisconsin, (then "Southport"). He remained nine years in Kenosha before moving to the neighboring city of Racine, where he re-established his business. Over the next several decades, he partnered with many different men for his business, first S. F. Heath for seven years, then his son, Edmund, who was his partner until his death in 1865, then he partnered with his daughters' husbands, George Beemer and H. J. Smith. The last partnership lasted for 25 years, until Elkins' death, making it the oldest jewelry business in the county.

Politically, Elkins was a member of the Whig Party, and joined the Republican Party after it was organized in the 1850s. He served as a member of the Racine school commission for two terms, and was elected to the Wisconsin State Assembly in 1872, serving in the 26th Wisconsin Legislature. He represented Racine County's first Assembly district, which then comprised just the city of Racine. He ran for re-election in 1873, but was defeated by Democrat Charles Frederick Bliss.

Elkins died at his home in Racine on December 13, 1898. His death followed a long decline in health.

== Personal life and family ==
John Elkins was the fourth child born to Josiah Elkins and his wife Nancy (née Shirley). After his father's death in 1838, his mother came to live with him in the west until her death in 1867.

On January 22, 1840, John Elkins married Eliza Putnam in Rushville, Illinois. Putnam was a native of Schenectady, New York. They had four children together, one child died in childhood, and another died as a young man. His wife died in 1897, just after their 57th anniversary.

== Electoral history ==
=== Wisconsin Assembly (1872) ===
Wisconsin Assembly, Racine 1st District Election, 1872
Party	Candidate	Votes	%	±%
General Election, November 5, 1872
Republican	John Elkins	1,327	61.84%	+14.76%
Liberal Republican	Samuel Ritchie	819	38.16%	
Plurality		508	23.67%	+17.82%
Total votes		2,146	100.0%	+38.01%
Republican gain from Democratic				

Wisconsin Assembly, Racine 1st District Election, 1873
Party	Candidate	Votes	%	±%
General Election, November 4, 1873
Democratic	Charles F. Bliss	1,079	56.46%	
Republican	John Elkins (incumbent)	832	43.54%	−18.30%
Plurality		247	12.93%	-10.75%
Total votes		1,911	100.0%	-10.95%
Democratic gain from Republican				

Wisconsin State Assembly
Preceded by Richard B. Bates	Member of the Wisconsin State Assembly from the Racine 1st district January 6, 1873 – January 5, 1874	Succeeded by Charles Frederick Bliss
