= Lucius S. Blake =

American politician (1816–1894)

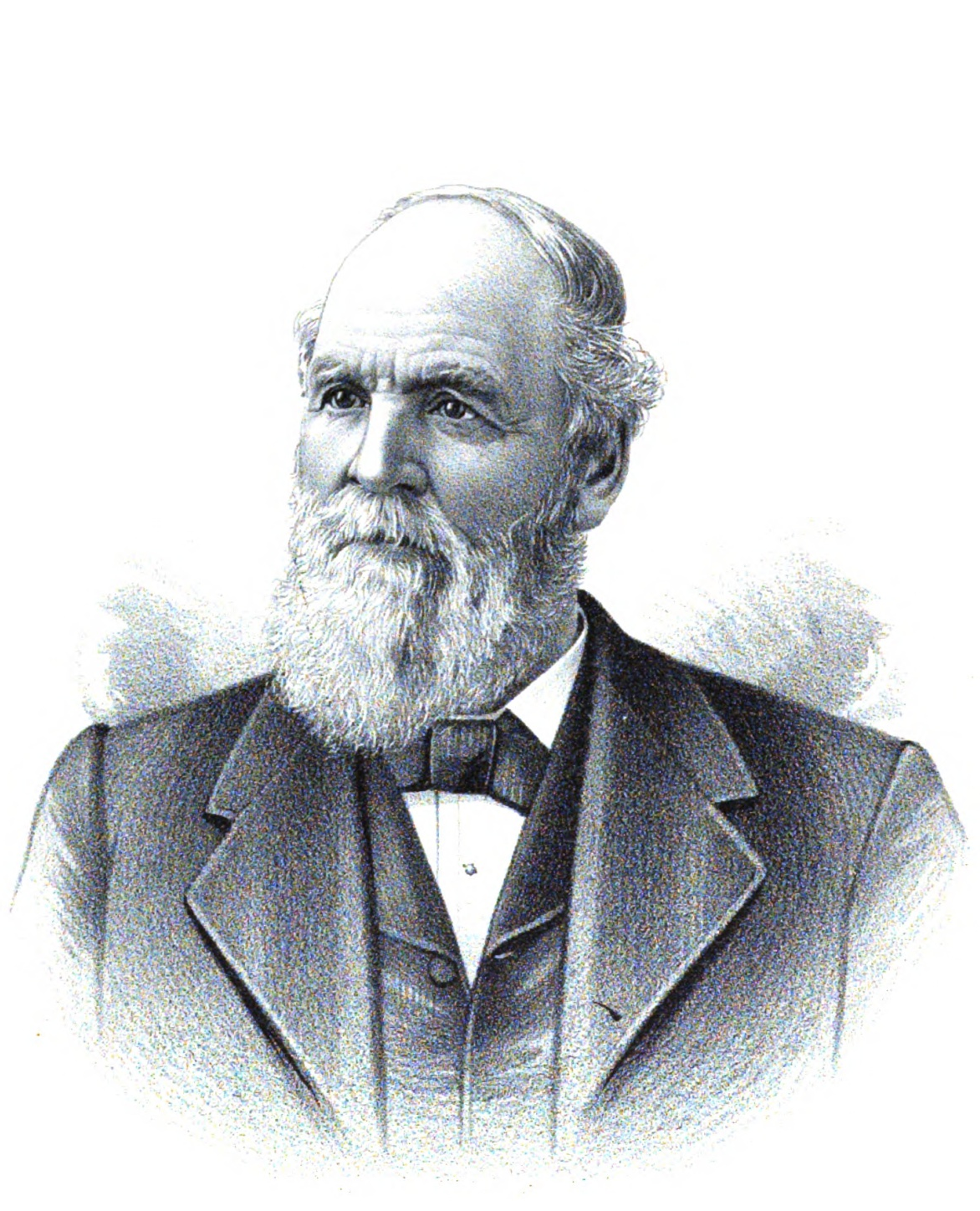
- From Portrait and Biographical Album of Racine and Kenosha Counties, Wisconsin (1892)

Member of the Wisconsin State Assembly from the Racine 1st district
- In office January 2, 1871 – January 1, 1872
- Preceded by: Albert L. Phillips
- Succeeded by: Richard B. Bates

County Treasurer of Racine County, Wisconsin
- In office January 1845 – January 1846
- Preceded by: Levi Blake
- Succeeded by: Seneca Raymond

Personal details
- Born: March 14, 1816 Burlington, Vermont, U.S.
- Died: November 4, 1894 (aged 78) Racine, Wisconsin, U.S.
- Resting place: Mound Cemetery, Racine
- Party: Republican; Free Soil (1848–1854); Democratic (before 1848)
- Spouse: Caroline Elliot (m. 1843–1894)
- Children: Fransesa Blake^{(b. 1844; died 1845)}; Lucius E. Blake^{(b. 1846; died 1852)}; Byron Bradbury Blake^{(b. 1848; died 1903)}; Stella Marion (Hart)^{(b. 1852; died 1915)}; Adoniram Judson Blake^{(b. 1856; died 1914)}
- Occupation: Carpenter, manufacturer
- Nickname: "Fanning Mill" Blake

Lucius Sawyer Blake (March 14, 1816 – November 4, 1894) was an American carpenter, businessman, and Wisconsin pioneer. He was an early settler at Racine, Wisconsin, and contributed significantly to the economic development of the city. He also represented Racine in the Wisconsin State Assembly during the 1871 session.

== Early life ==
Lucius S. Blake was born March 14, 1816, in Burlington, Vermont. He had little education in his childhood, and worked as an assistant in his father's shops, following him from Vermont to Erie County, New York, and then apprenticed as a carpenter and joiner. About 1834, the family started moving west by wagon, settling briefly in Michigan and Chicago, before making a claim on 600 acres of land in the area that is now Caledonia, Wisconsin. Lucius and his two elder brothers went first with their father and Lucius and his brother, Albert, were left to occupy and improve their claim until the rest of the family could arrive. They were among the first American settlers in Racine County.

== Pioneer businessman ==
After working several years helping his father establish their homestead, he set off on his own in 1838. After working for a short time employed by Samuel Hale and John Bullen for construction of buildings in Kenosha, he came to Racine and opened his own carpentry shop in 1839. In this era before the invention of threshing machines, Blake's main work product was manual fanning mills for the grain farmers of Racine County. This was highly profitable for him, and he soon incorporated horse power and steam powered machines into his manufacturing, producing as many as 3,000 mills per year. His business earned him the nickname "Fanning Mill Blake".

Beyond his own company, he was described as a critical pioneer and investor in many of the manufacturing businesses of Racine, serving as incorporator and president of Racine Woolen Mills, incorporator and president of the Chicago Rubber Clothing Company of Racine, incorporator and director of the Huffman-Puffer Trunk Manufacturing Company, incorporator and director of the E. H. Pease Manufacturing Company, president of the Turner Stove Manufacturing Company, incorporator and director of the Racine Steam Knitting Company, director in the Nail and Tack Manufacturing Company, and director in the Manufacturers National Bank.

== Political career ==
Politically, Blake was originally a member of the Democratic Party and cast his first vote for Andrew Jackson. As a Democrat, he was a member of Racine's village board in 1844, and then served as county treasurer in 1845, following his father's term in that office. He joined the Free Soil Party when it split from the Democrats in the late 1840s over the issue of slavery, and then joined the Republican Party when it was organized in the 1850s. After Racine became a city, he served as city railroad commissioner in 1860 and then served as a member of the city council in 1869, 1871, 1873, 1874, and 1877.

At the outbreak of the American Civil War, he was appointed provost marshal and draft commissioner at Camp Utley in Racine, and managed the first draft in the state of Wisconsin. He ran for mayor of Racine in 1862, but was defeated by Alvin Raymond. He was chosen as a delegate to the 1872 Republican National Convention, and served as a presidential elector for James A. Garfield, in 1880.

He was elected to the Wisconsin State Assembly in 1870, running on the Republican Party ticket. He represented Racine County's first Assembly district, which then comprised just the city of Racine. He served in the 24th Wisconsin Legislature but was then defeated running for re-election in 1871.

He ran again for mayor of Racine in 1878 and 1879, but was defeated on both attempts. At the time, he was described as the largest individual taxpayer in the city.

He died of a sudden heart failure at his home in Racine, on November 4, 1894. He was described as a millionaire at the time of his death.

== Personal life and legacy ==
Lucius S. Blake was the third of ten children born to Captain Levi Blake and his wife Mary Ann (née Sanford). His father served as an officer in the New York militia during the War of 1812 and served as county treasurer of Racine County in 1844; he later moved further west and was one of the founders of Sparta, Wisconsin.

Two of Lucius' brothers, Edward and Levi, served as officers in the Union Army during the American Civil War. Levi died of wounds near Baton Rouge, Louisiana.

Lucius married Caroline Elliott on December 26, 1843, at Racine. Caroline was an English American immigrant who had settled in Raymond, Wisconsin, with her parents in 1840. Lucius and Caroline had five children, though their first two children died young. Their eldest surviving son, Byron Bradbury Blake, worked as a superintendent at the J. I. Case Company.

In addition to his business and political pursuits, Blake was a deacon and member of the board of trustees of the First Baptist Church of Racine. He was also an early and prominent supporter of the Racine Fire Department—they named their second steam-powered fire engine in his honor.

The former Blake family residence at 936 Main Street, in Racine, was restored in 1976, and is now operated as private apartments by the company Preservation Racine Inc.

== Electoral history ==
=== Racine Mayor (1862) ===
Racine Mayoral Election, 1862
Party	Candidate	Votes	%	±%
General Election, April 1, 1862
Democratic	Alvin Raymond	642	54.97%	
Republican	Lucius S. Blake	526	45.03%	
Plurality		116	9.93%	
Total votes		1,168	100.0%	
Democratic gain from Republican				

=== Wisconsin Assembly (1870, 1871) ===
Wisconsin Assembly, Racine 1st District Election, 1870
Party	Candidate	Votes	%	±%
General Election, November 8, 1870
Republican	Lucius S. Blake	874	55.14%	−3.03%
Democratic	Herman Warner	711	44.86%	
Plurality		163	10.28%	-6.07%
Total votes		1,585	100.0%	+66.14%
Republican hold				

Wisconsin Assembly, Racine 1st District Election, 1871
Party	Candidate	Votes	%	±%
General Election, November 7, 1871
Democratic	Richard B. Bates	823	52.93%	
Republican	Lucius S. Blake (incumbent)	732	47.07%	−8.07%
Plurality		91	5.85%	-4.43%
Total votes		1,555	100.0%	-1.89%
Democratic gain from Republican				

=== Racine Mayor (1878, 1879) ===
Racine Mayoral Election, 1878
Party	Candidate	Votes	%	±%
General Election, April 2, 1878
Democratic	John G. Meachem (incumbent)	1,418	54.81%	
Republican	Lucius S. Blake	1,169	45.19%	
Plurality		249	9.63%	
Total votes		2,587	100.0%	
Democratic hold				

Racine Mayoral Election, 1879
Party	Candidate	Votes	%	±%
General Election, April 1, 1879
Democratic	E. J. Hueffner	1,495	52.90%	
Republican	Lucius S. Blake	1,331	47.10%	+1.91%
Plurality		164	5.80%	-3.82%
Total votes		2,826	100.0%	+9.24%
Democratic hold				

Wisconsin State Assembly
Preceded by Albert L. Phillips	Member of the Wisconsin State Assembly from the Racine 1st district January 2, 1871 – January 1, 1872	Succeeded by Richard B. Bates
Political offices
Preceded by Levi Blake	County Treasurer of Racine County, Wisconsin; January 1845 – January 1846	Succeeded by Seneca Raymond
