= Watervliet Side Cut Locks =

- U.S. National Register of Historic Places
- Location within New York Location within the United States
- Area: 0 acres (0 ha)
- NRHP reference No.: 71000529
- Added to NRHP: August 12, 1971

Watervliet Side Cut Locks, also known as the West Troy Side Cut Locks and "Double Locks," is a historic set of locks for the Erie Canal located at Watervliet in Albany County, New York. The side cut locks connected the Erie Canal to the Hudson River to allow for simplified access from Troy. They initially consisted of a lock at the Erie Canal (at about the modern 23rd Street), and a lock at the Hudson River. During the subsequent enlargement of the canal, the original lock at the canal and 23rd Street was doubled, and a new pair of locks were built gating to the Hudson River (while at the same time the general area was reconfigured.) The lock walls and sea wall are constructed of cut limestone blocks.

It was listed on the National Register of Historic Places in 1971.

The remains of the locks for the Hudson River end are buried under Interstate 787 and the northbound exit ramp for 23rd Street. The ruins of the locks are in good condition but have been buried to protect them and are not accessible

Originally, a weigh lock was located where the side-cut met the Erie Canal, but this was subsequently replaced by a new weigh lock a short distance further north
