= Llewelyn Evans =

Welsh American theologian (1833–1892)

Member of the Wisconsin State Assembly from the Racine 1st district
- In office January 5, 1857 – January 4, 1858
- Preceded by: Thomas Falvey
- Succeeded by: Hermon Warner

Personal details
- Born: June 23, 1833 Flintshire, Wales, UK
- Died: July 25, 1892 (aged 59) Colwyn Bay, Wales, UK
- Party: Republican

Llewelyn Ioan Evans (June 23, 1833 – July 25, 1892) was a Welsh American theologian and politician. With his parents, he was an early pioneer of Racine, Wisconsin, and represented Racine in the Wisconsin State Assembly during the 10th Wisconsin Legislature (1857). He then served more than a decade as a professor at Lane Seminary, in Cincinnati, Ohio. Later in life he returned to his native Wales.

Wisconsin State Assembly
Preceded by Thomas Falvey	Member of the Wisconsin State Assembly from the Racine 1st district January 5, 1857 – January 4, 1858	Succeeded by Hermon Warner
