= Otis Wells Johnson =

American politician (1855–1926)

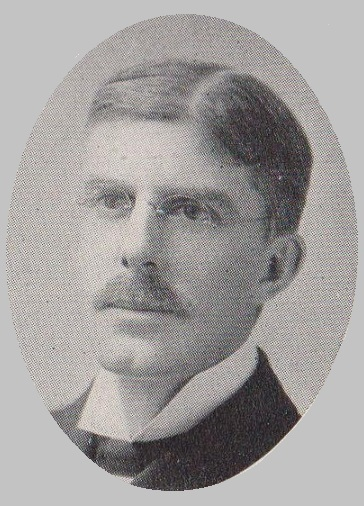

Member of the Wisconsin Senate from the 3rd district
- In office January 5, 1903 – January 7, 1907
- Preceded by: John F. Reynolds
- Succeeded by: Isaac T. Bishop

Personal details
- Born: March 12, 1855 Saugatuck, Michigan, U.S.
- Died: September 27, 1926 (aged 71) Racine, Wisconsin, U.S.
- Resting place: Mound Cemetery, Racine
- Party: Republican
- Spouse: married
- Children: 4
- Occupation: Manufacturer, banker

Otis Wells Johnson (March 12, 1855 – September 27, 1926) was an American manufacturer, banker, and Republican politician. He represented Racine and Kenosha counties in the Wisconsin Senate during the 1903 and 1905 sessions.

== Biography ==
He attended public schools, and later the University of Maine at Farmington. He was first employed in the lumber industry in St. Ignace, Michigan, later for a while in a Chicago lumberyard, and afterwards at St. Ignace again, where he resided until he came to Racine, Wisconsin in 1890 where he engaged in the manufacture of farm wagons.

Johnson was elected to the Senate as a member of the Republican Party and served from 1903 to 1907.
