= St. Nicholas Ukrainian Catholic Church =

Historic church in New York, United States

- U.S. National Register of Historic Places
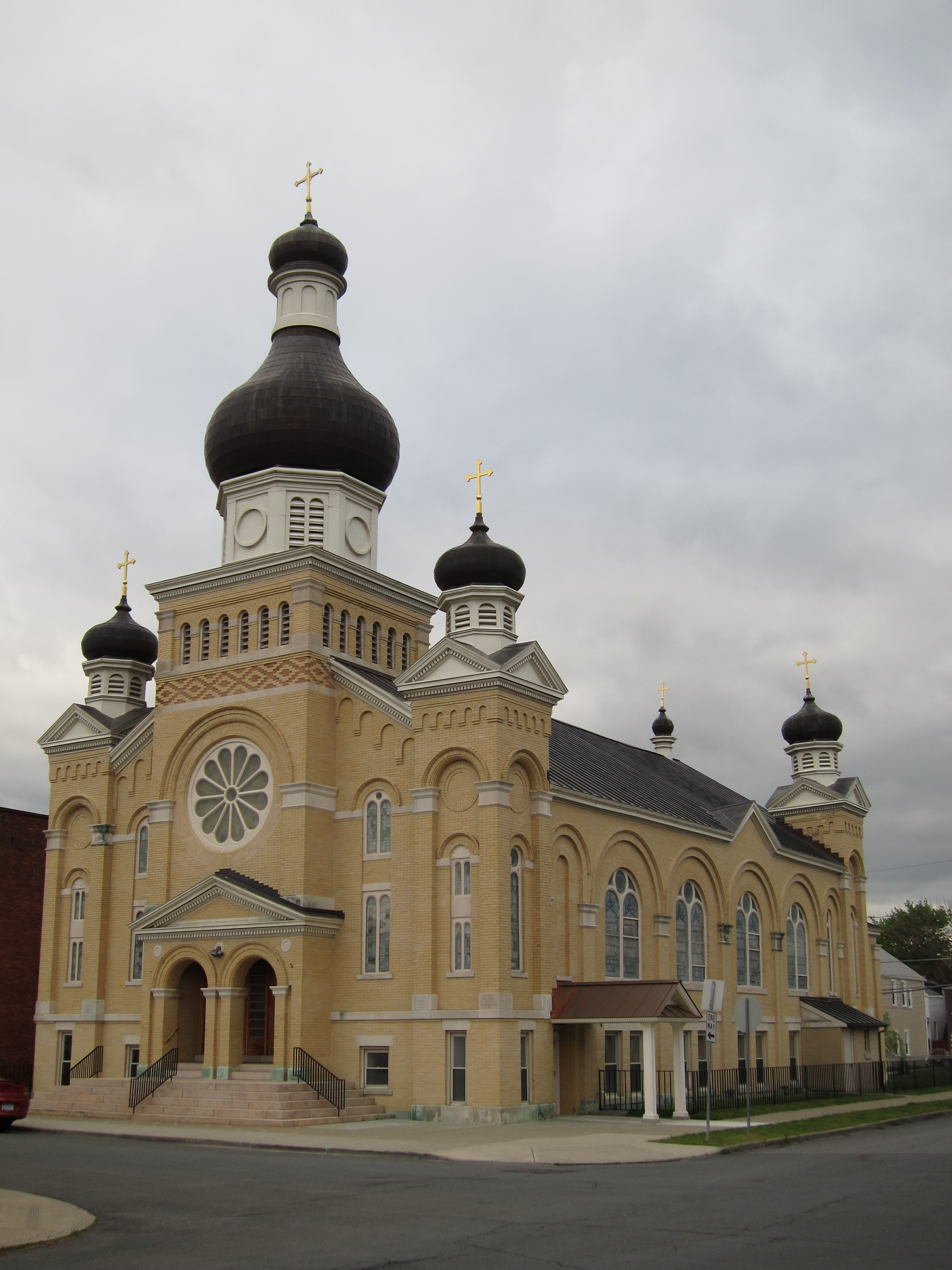
- Church in 2012

- Location within New York Location within the United States
- Location: 4th Ave. and 24th St., Watervliet, New York
- Coordinates: 42.7343°N 73.7030°W
- Area: less than one acre
- Built: 1906–1908
- Architect: Noack, Bernhardt
- NRHP reference No.: 04000288
- Added to NRHP: April 15, 2004

St. Nicholas Ukrainian Catholic Church, (Note: The church is incorrectly listed as "St. Nicholas Ukranian Catholic Church" in the National Register Information System (NRIS) database, hence it is also incorrectly listed in various websites echoing the public domain NRIS data. Its correct name, using "Ukrainian" not "Ukranian", is clear from the property's NRHP nomination form.) also known as St. Nicholas Greek Catholic Church, is a historic Ukrainian Catholic church in Watervliet, New York. It is listed on the National Register of Historic Places.

== History ==
In 1897, a frame meetinghouse became the First Ukrainian Catholic Church in South Troy. However, an increasing Ukrainian population in the area soon required a larger facility for the parish. A certificate of incorporation was filed in January 1900 for St. Nicholas Greek Catholic Church (Note: This name was used during the eighteenth century to distinguish it from Roman and Armenian Catholic churches.) and plans were begun on a new building. The church would serve Watervliet, Cohoes, and South Troy, with Watervliet chosen as the site because of its central location.

A campaign begun in 1905 raised over $4,500 for the project. In February 1906 a lot and building at 4th Avenue and 24th Street were purchased for $1,650; the existing structure was demolished. The new church was designed by Bernhardt Noack. Construction is thought to have begun in late 1906, and in May 1907 the cornerstone was laid and the building's walls were well underway. By late 1907, the project's funds were exhausted and the Cohoes and South Troy parish members withdrew their support. Economic distress from the Panic of 1907 led the remaining Watervliet supporters to seek help from Thomas Burke, the Roman Catholic Bishop of Albany. The church was able to get a $20,000 loan and was incorporated into the Albany Diocese. Construction on the church was completed in early 1908.

In the late 1940s, the interior was re-plastered and new religious iconography painted; the original slate roof was replaced with copper. Further work through the 1950s and 60s included basement modernization, the removal of the center dome, and the replacement of trim and the main steps.

The church was nominated for inclusion on the National Register of Historic Places under Criterion C for its local architectural significance. The nomination form describes it as the "preeminent architectural statement" of the Ukrainian Catholic community in Watervliet. The church was listed on the National Register on April 15, 2004.

== Architecture and setting ==
The building is large, one-story building with a raised basement. The facade consists of buff-colored brick arranged in common bond with limestone trim. The building's distinctive Eastern European appearance comes primarily from its onion-domed towers and round-arched windows.

The church is situated in a residential area. The adjacent parish house fronts 4th Avenue to the north of the church and is similarly set back from the road. Because the parish house has been heavily altered from its original condition, it was deemed to not contribute to the church property's significance.

== See also ==
- National Register of Historic Places listings in Albany County, New York
