= Charles H. Everett =

20th century American politician

Member of the Wisconsin Senate from the 3rd district
- In office January 4, 1915 – January 1919
- Preceded by: Isaac T. Bishop
- Succeeded by: George L. Buck

Member of the Wisconsin State Assembly from the Racine 1st district
- In office January 6, 1913 – January 4, 1915
- Preceded by: William H. Bell
- Succeeded by: John Dixon

Personal details
- Born: March 22, 1855 Turtle, Wisconsin, U.S.
- Died: July 5, 1947 (aged 92) Los Angeles, California, U.S.
- Resting place: Oakwood Cemetery, Beloit, Wisconsin
- Party: Republican
- Spouses: Angerona E. Barningham (m. 1878; died 1903); Grace Lang (died 1954)
- Occupation: Farmer

Charles Horatio Everett (March 22, 1855 – July 5, 1947) was an American farmer, agricultural leader, and Republican politician from the U.S. state of Wisconsin. He was a member of the Wisconsin Senate (1915 & 1917) and State Assembly (1913), representing Racine County.

== Biography ==
Everett was born on March 22, 1855, in Turtle, Wisconsin, in Rock County. He was raised and educated at the common schools in Rock County, becoming a successful farmer and livestock breeder.

In 1895, he moved to Racine, Wisconsin, where he became the editor of the Wisconsin Agriculturist—a business magazine catering to farmers—and continued in that role for nearly 30 years. For fifteen years, he also worked as a traveling lecturer for Wisconsin farm interests. He was the president of the Wisconsin State Dairymen's Association for two terms and was an appointed member of the Wisconsin State Board of Agriculture for decades, serving more than 15 years as secretary.

In 1910, he made his first run for state office when he launched a primary challenge against incumbent state senator Isaac T. Bishop. He lost by about 800 votes.

Two years later, he ran for Wisconsin State Assembly in Racine County's 1st Assembly district (comprising most of the city of Racine). He was elected with 47% of the vote in a four-way contest. In 1914, Isaac Bishop announced he would not run for another term in the State Senate, and Everett then ran to replace him in the 1914 election. Everett prevailed in the general election with 51% of the vote.

In 1918, rather than running for re-election to the Senate, he ran for Lieutenant Governor of Wisconsin in the Republican primary. He ran as a ticket with gubernatorial candidate Roy P. Wilcox on a patriotic platform in favor of U.S. participation in World War I. U.S. participation in the war was highly controversial with Wisconsin's German population, and the Republican incumbents had favored isolationism. Ultimately Wilcox and Everett fell short in the primary, and Everett did not run for office again.

He died at the age of 92 on July 5, 1947, in Los Angeles, California, but is interred in his home county in Beloit, Wisconsin.

== Electoral history ==
=== Wisconsin Senate (1910) ===
Wisconsin Senate, 3rd District Election, 1910
Party	Candidate	Votes	%	±%
Republican Primary, September 6, 1910
Republican	Isaac T. Bishop (incumbent)	3,656	56.46%	+16.11%
Republican	Charles H. Everett	2,819	43.54%	
Plurality		837	12.93%	+3.38%
Total votes		6,475	100.0%	+46.27%

=== Wisconsin Assembly (1912) ===
Wisconsin Assembly, Racine 1st District Election, 1912
Party	Candidate	Votes	%	±%
General Election, November 5, 1912
Republican	Charles H. Everett	1,887	47.26%	−18.99%
Democratic	Peter J. Meyers	1,618	40.52%	+29.75%
Social Democratic	Arthur C. Bowman	353	8.84%	−14.14%
Prohibition	Willis Cahoon	135	3.38%	
Plurality		269	6.74%	-36.52%
Total votes		3,993	100.0%	+33.59%

=== Wisconsin Senate (1914) ===
Wisconsin Senate, 3rd District Election, 1914
Party	Candidate	Votes	%	±%
General Election, November 3, 1914
Republican	Charles H. Everett	6,027	51.70%	−25.08%
Democratic	R. W. McCracken	4,677	40.12%	
Social Democratic	Jacob Jacobs	713	8.84%	−14.86%
Prohibition	William J. Hansche	240	2.06%	−0.18%
Plurality		1,350	11.58%	-44.23%
Total votes		11,657	100.0%	+68.28%

=== Wisconsin Lieutenant Governor (1918) ===
Wisconsin Lieutenant Gubernatorial Election, 1918
Party	Candidate	Votes	%	±%
Republican Primary, September 3, 1918
Republican	Edward Dithmar (incumbent)	74,402	44.94%	
Republican	Charles H. Everett	53,266	32.17%	
Republican	Harley Nickerson	37,895	22.89%	
Plurality		21,136	12.77%	
Total votes		165,563	100.0%	
