= Karel Jonas House =

Historic building in Racine, Wisconsin

- U.S. National Register of Historic Places
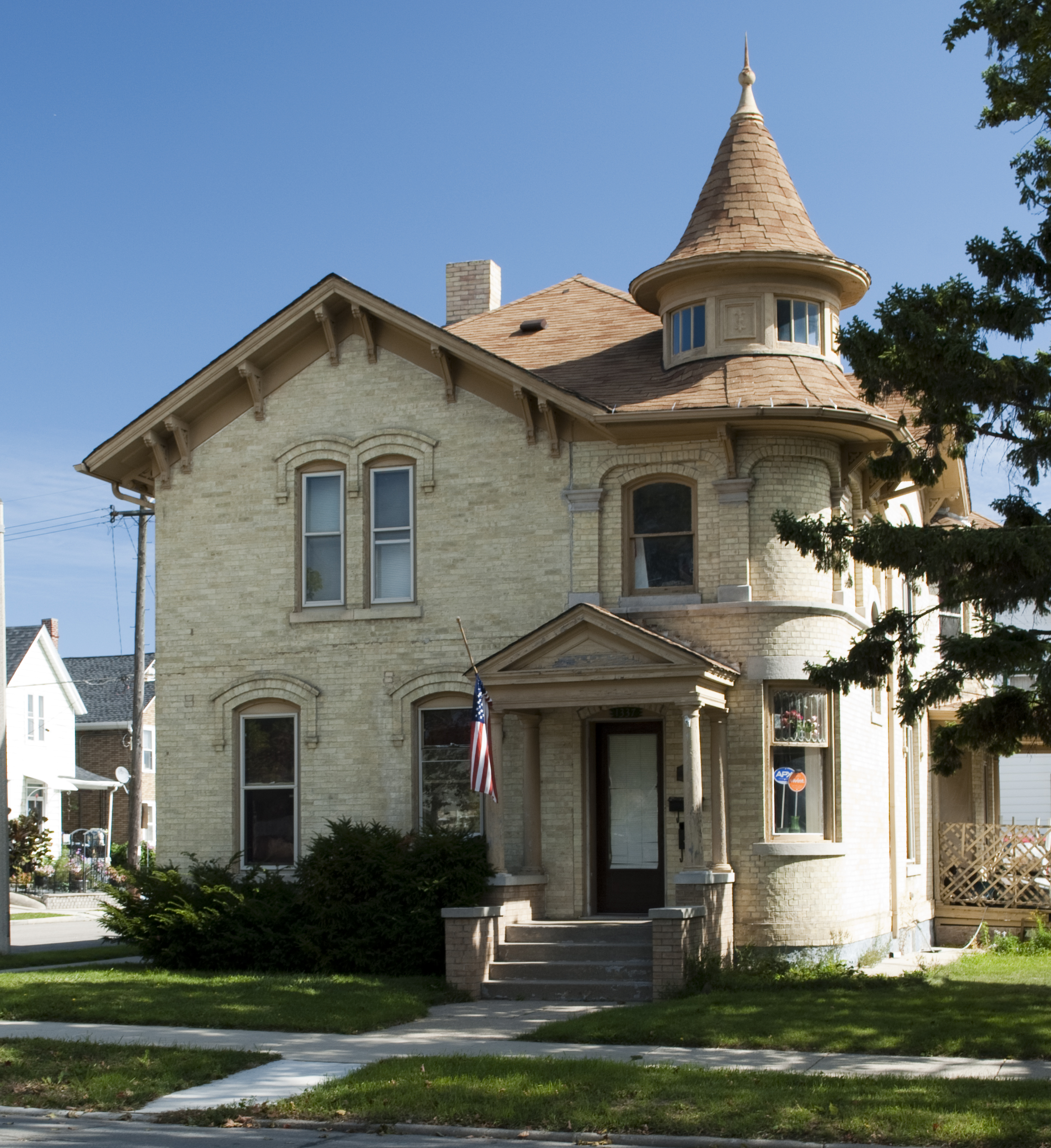
- The Jonas House in 2012

- Location within Wisconsin
- Location: 1337 N. Erie Street; Racine, Wisconsin
- Coordinates: 42°44′17″N 87°47′12″W
- Area: 0.25 acres (0.10 ha)
- Built: 1878
- Architectural style: Italianate
- NRHP reference No.: 82000700
- Added to NRHP: March 1, 1982

The Karel Jonas House, also known as Terry B. Vetter House, is a historic residence in Racine, Wisconsin, United States, that was home to journalist, politician, and diplomat Charles Jonas (Czech: Karel Jonáš). It was built in 1878. It was added to the National Register of Historic Places on March 1, 1982.

Karel Jonas was born in 1840, the son of a weaver in Malešov, a village in Bohemia, then under the Habsburg Empire. His family was able to educate him, and he became a political journalist associated with the Czech nationalist František Ladislav Rieger. In 1860, Jonas published a critique of the Habsburg education system – primarily how it favored Germans over Slavs. The authorities confiscated all copies, expelled Jonas from school, and he escaped to London.

In 1863 Jonas came to Racine, to edit a new Czech-language newspaper Slavie. Next year he married Kristina Korizek, the daughter of the founder of the paper. Through the Civil War, he and his paper supported the Union cause and the Republican party. In 1870 he returned to Europe to cover the Franco-Prussian War. When that ended in 1871, he slipped back into Prague for six or seven months, and wrote tracts like "Reasons for the Defeat of France" and "Women in Human Society, Especially in England and America." But he had left Austria ten years before without an exit visa and without serving his military obligations, so he soon returned to America.

Back in Racine, he continued publishing, and became the first leader in the Czech-American community. He also worked to help Czech immigrants adapt to the U.S. and the English language. He produced a primer called Spelling Book and First Reader for Czech-Slavic Youth in America, and the first known Czech-English dictionary. As the Republican establishment of the time became more aligned with capitalists and prohibitionists, Jonas's sympathies turned to the Horace Greeley's Liberal Republican candidacy, and then the Democratic Party. In 1876 he won a seat on Racine's common council for the fourth ward, which was largely Czech, and from 1878 to 1880 he served as president of that council. In 1877 he was elected to the Wisconsin assembly, where he advocated for labor causes, focusing on child labor issues.

In 1878 he and Kristina built the house which is the subject of this article. Though the house now looks a bit whimsical and exotic, the original did not. Where the round corner and turret now stand was open space, so the original house had a gabled-ell form, 2-story brick Italianate with segmentally arched windows and deep eaves supported by wooden brackets. The main entry was at the inside corner of the ell. The house was thoroughly dignified and standard for the time.

In 1885 Jonas won a seat on the State Senate. In 1887 his political connections got him placed as diplomatic consul in his beloved Prague, where he advocated expanding U.S. trade with the region and shared American farming techniques with Czech farmers. This patronage position ended with the first Cleveland administration and he returned to Wisconsin. In 1890 Jonas was elected Lieutenant Governor under Governor George W. Peck. In 1894 he resigned that post and was appointed consul to several cities in Europe. Disappointed with his appointments and somewhat estranged from his wife, he died in Germany in 1896.

Peter Stoffel, a merchant, bought the house from Jonas in 1894. Some time between 1901 and 1908, Stoffel filled in the ell, adding the rounded corner and turret, added the 2-story bay on the south side, and the pedimented portico which now shelters the front door.

== See also ==
- National Register of Historic Places listings in Racine County, Wisconsin
