= W. W. Woolnough =

American politician

Walter Waters Woolnough
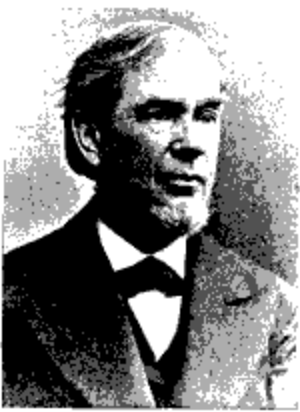
- Newsman and politician W. W. Woolnough
- Born: July 1822; Bungay, Suffolk
- Died: February 2, 1904 (aged 81); Battle Creek, Michigan
- Occupations: Newspaperman, abolitionist, politician

Walter Waters Woolnough (July 1822 - February 2, 1904) was a Michigan newspaperman, abolitionist and local politician, and one of the co-founders of the Republican Party in Michigan.

== Background ==
Woolnough was born in Bungay, Suffolk, and came with his family to Rochester, New York in 1833. He started work in the printing department of the Rochester Republican newspaper. In 1841, having finished his apprenticeship, he moved on to the Ashtabula Sentinel as a foreman. In August 1842, he married Emiline Manley of Ashtabula, with whom he would eventually have four daughters. He returned to Rochester in 1843, and in 1845 left for Battle Creek, Michigan with equipment sufficient to begin publication of the Western Citizen, the first newspaper ever published in that city. This failed, and he began instead to publish the fiercely Whig and anti-slavery Michigan Tribune, which also failed. In 1852, he bought the Battle Creek Journal from its founders, and became its editor and publisher.

He opposed the Whig nomination of Zachary Taylor, whom he considered the candidate of the pro-slavery wing of the Whigs. By 1854, Woolnough had given up on the party, calling to disband it and form an explicitly abolitionist party. He chaired a February meeting in his office, which led to a larger meeting in Battle Creek's Hinman Hall, which in turn led to the 'Under the Oaks' conclave in Jackson, Michigan, on July 6, 1854 (the first statewide convention that formed a platform and nominated candidates under the Republican name) where he was one of the sixty delegates who formed the new Republican Party.

In 1858, having freshly been elected to the legislature, he was one of the five local citizens appointed to write a charter for the new City of Battle Creek (until then a village).

== Elective office ==
Woolnough served one term in the 1859 session of the Michigan House of Representatives, representing the 3rd Calhoun County house district as a Republican. He was assigned to the standing committees on printing (of which he was chair), and on engrossment and enrollment. He spent some time as an alderman from Battle Creek's third ward; and as a justice of the peace. He served on the city's school board, eventually becoming its chairman.

== After the Legislature ==
In 1863, he sold the Journal to Charles E. Griffith, and for seven years published a second Michigan Tribune, which was accounted more successful than its predecessor. In 1872, he was a supporter of Horace Greeley's presidential campaign, and from that time on was identified with the mugwump faction of the Republican Party. In 1883, he became an editorial writer and political editor for the Daily Moon of Battle Creek. He was famous for his ability to set the type for his columns by hand as he wrote them.

By then the oldest newspaper editor in the state, Woolnough died February 2, 1904, at his home in Battle Creek.

The Woolnoughs' eldest daughter, also named Emiline, in 1876 married newsman E. A. Egery, who would later serve a term in Wisconsin's legislature. After Egery was convicted of financial crimes in Wisconsin, she would return to Battle Creek and become an accomplished newswoman herself at the Moon and other papers, under the name Mrs. Emiline Egery.
