= Ohio Street Methodist Episcopal Church Complex =

Historic church in New York, United States

- U.S. National Register of Historic Places
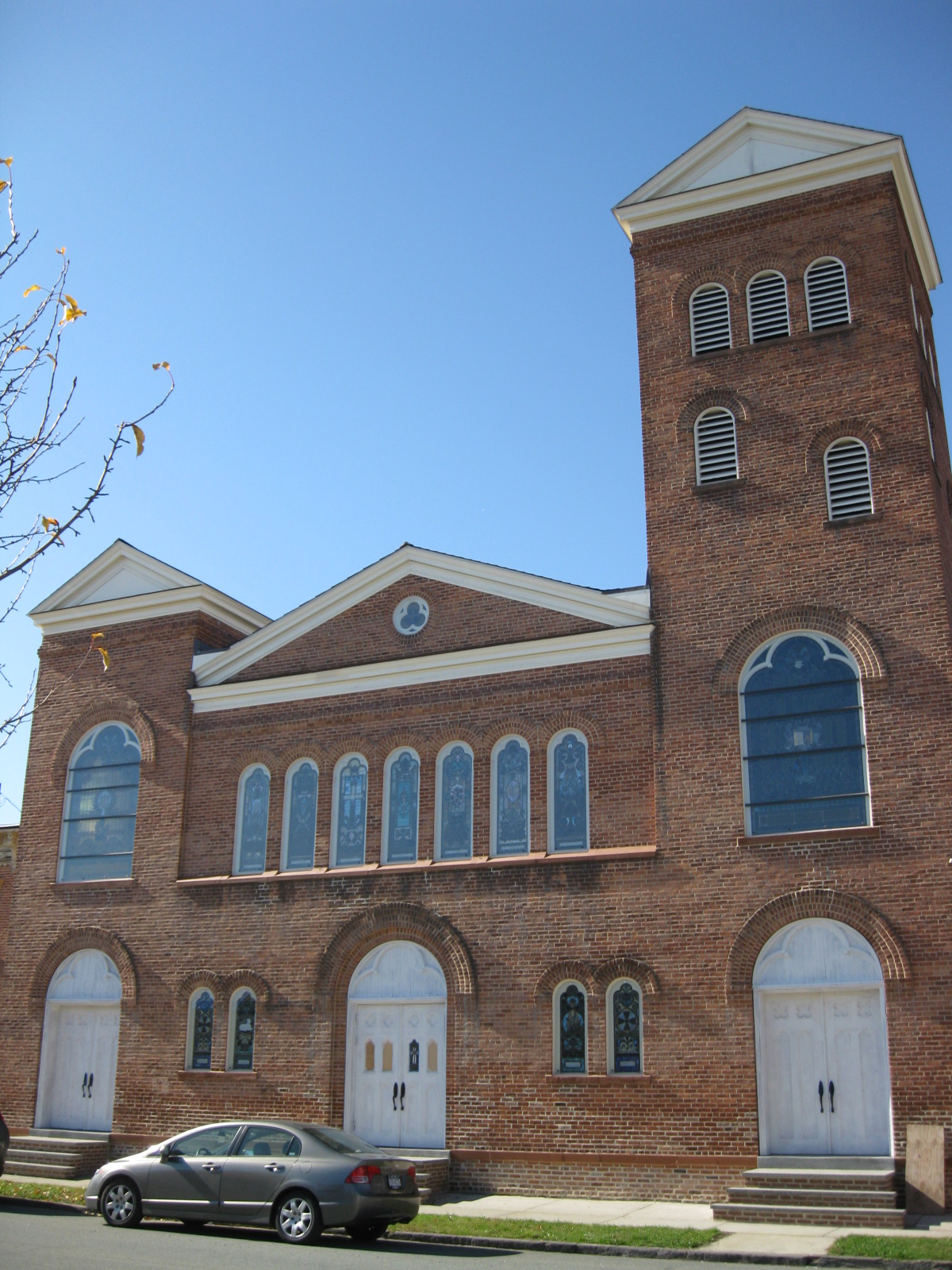
- Ohio Street Methodist Episcopal Church Complex, October 2009

- Location within New York Location within the United States
- Location: 1921 Third Ave., Watervliet, New York
- Coordinates: 42°43′51.93″N 73°42′10.58″W
- Area: less than one acre
- Built: 1850
- Architectural style: Greek Revival, Romanesque
- NRHP reference No.: 05001393
- Added to NRHP: December 8, 2005

Ohio Street Methodist Episcopal Church Complex, also known as Third Avenue Methodist Church and St. Ann Maronite Catholic Church, is a historic Methodist Episcopal church at 1921 Third Avenue in Watervliet, Albany County, New York. It was originally built about 1850 and modified about 1895. The parish house was built about 1880. Both are brick buildings with wood floor and roof framing and stone foundations.

It was listed on the National Register of Historic Places in 2005.

In 2013 the church was renamed St. Ann Maronite Catholic Church as the 100 year old Maronite congregation, previously located on 4th Street in Troy brought the vacant Methodist Church Complex from the city of Watervliet.
