= Charles Frederick Bliss =

19th century American politician

Charles F. Bliss
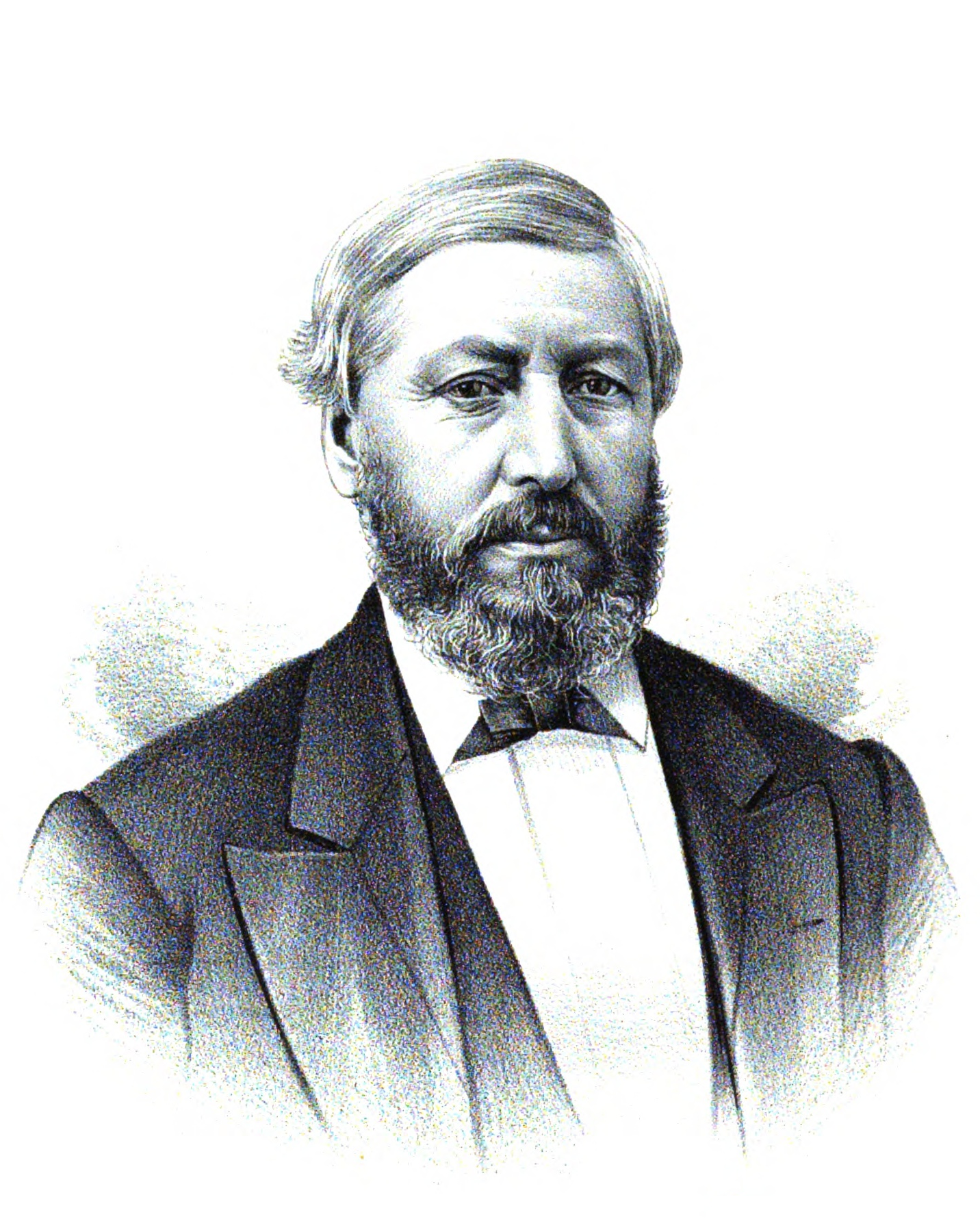
- From Portrait and Biographical Album of Racine and Kenosha Counties, Wisconsin (1892)

Member of the Wisconsin State Assembly from the Racine 1st district
- In office January 5, 1874 – January 3, 1876
- Preceded by: John Elkins
- Succeeded by: Norton J. Field

Personal details
- Born: December 27, 1817 Niederweiler, Grand Duchy of Baden
- Died: July 11, 1894 (aged 76) Racine, Wisconsin, U.S.
- Resting place: Mound Cemetery, Racine
- Party: Democratic
- Spouse: Catherine E. Closs (m. 1841; died 1893)
- Children: Mary Jane (Klein)^{(b. 1842; died 1926)}; George Seymour Bliss^{(b. 1844; died 1896)}; Charles W. Bliss^{(b. 1850; died 1878)}; Carrie (Lingsweiler)^{(b. 1850; died 1918)}; Amelia C. (Eddy)^{(b. 1855; died 1916)}
- Occupation: Baker, confectioner, soda-water manufacturer

Charles Frederick Bliss (December 27, 1817 – July 11, 1894) was a German American immigrant, baker, and Wisconsin pioneer. He was a member of the Wisconsin State Assembly, representing the city of Racine in the 1874 and 1875 sessions.

== Biography ==
Charles F. Bliss was born on December 27, 1817, in the village of Niederweiler, in what is now the state of Baden-Württemberg in southern Germany. After the death of his father, in 1833, he emigrated to the United States with his mother. They settled originally at Huron, Ohio, but his mother died just a few months after their arrival. He subsequently moved to New York state working in Buffalo and Rochester. He had apprenticed as a baker in Germany, but went to work as a cooper in New York to improve his income.

In October 1848, he moved west to Wisconsin, and settled at Racine. There, he resumed his profession as a baker and confectioner, and later began manufacturing and selling soda water and beer. He sold out of his bakery in 1875, and from then-on prioritized manufacturing soda and cider vinegar.

He was involved in local politics with the Democratic Party. He served on the Racine County board of supervisors in 1858, 1859, and 1861, he was a member of the Racine city council in 1859 and 1872, and was a school commissioner in 1865 and 1870.

In 1873, he was elected to his first term in the Wisconsin State Assembly, representing Racine County's first Assembly district, which then comprised just the city of Racine. He defeated incumbent Republican John Elkins and then won re-election in 1874, defeating former Assemblymember Horatio T. Taylor. He did not run for a third term in 1875.

He died after an illness of several weeks at his home in Racine, on July 11, 1894.

== Personal life and family ==
Charles F. Bliss married Catherine E. Closs on October 25, 1841, at Buffalo, New York. Closs was also a German American immigrant. They had five children together before her death in 1893.

Their eldest daughter, Mary Jane, married Louis Christian Klein, another German American immigrant and Racine pioneer, who also served in the State Assembly.

Their eldest son, George Seymour Bliss, was also prominent in Racine as a businessman and farmer. George's son, Harold Bliss, died in the Iroquois Theatre fire in Chicago in December 1903. He was a college student at the time, studying dentistry.

Charles F. Bliss was involved in many local fraternal and religious organizations. He was one of the original trustees of the First German Evangelical Lutheran Congregation of Racine. The Church still exists at the same location in Racine, though the current church building was constructed in 1897. He was also active in Freemasonry, and the Independent Order of Odd Fellows.

== Electoral history ==
=== Wisconsin Assembly (1873, 1874) ===
Wisconsin Assembly, Racine 1st District Election, 1873
Party	Candidate	Votes	%	±%
General Election, November 4, 1873
Democratic	Charles F. Bliss	1,079	56.46%	
Republican	John Elkins (incumbent)	832	43.54%	−18.30%
Plurality		247	12.93%	-10.75%
Total votes		1,911	100.0%	-10.95%
Democratic gain from Republican				

Wisconsin Assembly, Racine 1st District Election, 1874
Party	Candidate	Votes	%	±%
General Election, November 3, 1874
Democratic	Charles F. Bliss (incumbent)	1,116	52.22%	−4.24%
Republican	Horatio T. Taylor	1,021	47.78%	
Plurality		95	4.45%	-8.48%
Total votes		2,137	100.0%	+11.83%
Democratic hold				

Wisconsin State Assembly
Preceded by John Elkins	Member of the Wisconsin State Assembly from the Racine 1st district January 5, 1874 – January 3, 1876	Succeeded by Norton J. Field
