= Isaac T. Bishop =

American politician (1844–1920)

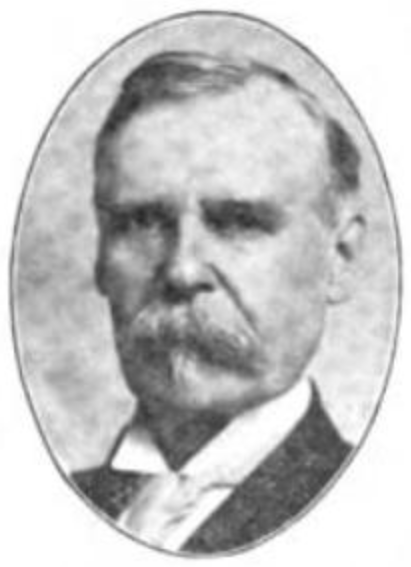
- From the Wisconsin Blue Book

Member of the Wisconsin Senate from the 3rd district
- In office January 7, 1907 – January 4, 1915
- Preceded by: Otis Wells Johnson
- Succeeded by: Charles H. Everett

Personal details
- Born: June 6, 1844 Somers, Wisconsin, U.S.
- Died: July 20, 1920 (aged 76) Somers, Wisconsin, U.S.
- Resting place: Oakwood Cemetery, Somers
- Party: Republican
- Spouses: Lydia J. Clemons (died 1912); Harriet Otto (Tanis) (m. 1915–1920)
- Children: John C. Bishop^{(b. 1870; died 1902)}; Adelmer Austin Bishop^{(b. 1871; died 1921)}; Isaac Thorn Bishop Jr.^{(b. 1878; died 1896)}; Edwin Sherwood Bishop^{(b. 1880; died 1916)}; Benjamin Harrison Bishop^{(b. 1887; died 1952)}
- Occupation: Farmer, politician

Military service
- Allegiance: United States
- Branch/service: United States Volunteers; Union Army
- Years of service: 1862–1865
- Rank: Private, USV
- Unit: Bty. B, 2nd Ill. Light Artillery; 55th Reg. Ill. Vol. Infantry
- Battles/wars: American Civil War

Isaac Thorn Bishop Sr. (June 6, 1844 – July 20, 1920) was an American farmer and Republican politician from Kenosha County, Wisconsin. He was a member of the Wisconsin Senate, representing the Wisconsin's 3rd Senate district for two terms (1907–1915).

== Early life and war service ==
Bishop was born on June 6, 1844, in Somers, Wisconsin. He was raised on his father's farm, and worked as a farmhand until 1861, when he went to work as a clerk for Doan & Hawley, dry goods merchants in the city of Kenosha, Wisconsin.

He left that job in the Summer of 1862, when he volunteered for service in the Union Army in the midst of the American Civil War. He was initially enrolled as a private in Battery B, 2nd Illinois Light Artillery Regiment, but was quickly transferred to Company C of the 55th Illinois Infantry Regiment and went to meet the regiment in the western theater of the war. He saw extensive combat during the Vicksburg Campaign, and wrote an account of the Battle of Arkansas Post in a letter to his sister in 1863. He survived the war without serious injury and mustered out near the end of the war, in May 1865.

After returning from the war, he resumed farming and eventually took over his father's farm in Somers, which he tended until 1908. In Somers, he was elected town chairman for at least five terms, served as justice of the peace, and served on the Kenosha County board of supervisors. He also worked for 37 years as an officer of the Somers Mutual Fire Insurance Company.

== Political career ==
From his local efforts, Bishop rose to prominence in the Kenosha County Republican Party. He first ran for state office in 1906, when he entered the race for the Republican Party nomination for Wisconsin Senate in the 3rd State Senate district—Racine and Kenosha counties. This was the first election to utilize the new primary process—rather than the old caucus system—to select nominees. Bishop challenged incumbent Republican senator Otis Wells Johnson and faced a third candidate, Professor Otis L. Trenary. Bishop prevailed in the primary with 40% of the vote. He went on to defeat Democrat Michael Higgins and Social Democrat W. W. Britton with 47% of the vote in the November general election.

Bishop faced another challenging primary in 1910, opposed by Charles H. Everett of Racine, the editor of the Wisconsin Agriculturist. This was an era of significant division within the Republican Party between progressive and stalwart factions, and while Everett did not openly declare for either side, Bishop was a self-described progressive who declared his support for the re-election of U.S. senator Robert M. La Follette. Bishop ultimately received 56% of the primary vote. He faced no Democratic opponent in the general election, and went on to receive 77% of the vote against Prohibition and Social Democratic candidates.

In 1914, Bishop declared he would not seek a third term in the Senate. He was succeeded by his 1910 primary opponent, Charles H. Everett.

== Personal life and family ==
Bishop was one of at least eleven children born to Jacob and Anna (née Potter) Bishop. The Bishops were some of the earliest American settlers of northern Kenosha County. Originally from New York, they came to Wisconsin after spending several years in Ohio, and established their farm in Somers about 1842. Jacob Bishop was the first clerk of the Somers school district. Anna Potter was a descendant of American Revolutionary War general James Potter.

Isaac Bishop was married twice, his first wife was Lydia J. Clemons. Clemons was a native of Utica, New York. They married in November 1886 and had five children together before her death in 1912. In 1915, the 70-year-old Bishop married 37-year-old widow Harriet Tanis (née Otto), who survived him. Of Bishop's five children, only two survived him. His eldest son, John, died in his 30s after falling from a stationary train car and hitting his head. Isaac Jr. died of a bowel obstruction at age 18. And Edwin suffered a fatal heart attack at age 35 while working as a professor at the University of Chicago.

Isaac Bishop was a leading member of the Knights of Pythias in Kenosha and was an avid historian. Near the end of his life, he claimed to own one of the three original drafts of the United States Declaration of Independence, which he planned to donate to the Smithsonian Institution.

He died at his home in Somers on July 20, 1920, following a long illness.

== Electoral history ==
=== Wisconsin Senate (1906, 1910) ===
Wisconsin Senate, 3rd District Election, 1906
Party	Candidate	Votes	%	±%
Republican Primary, September 4, 1906
Republican	Isaac T. Bishop	1,779	40.27%	
Republican	Otis Wells Johnson (incumbent)	1,365	30.90%	
Republican	Otis L. Trenary	1,274	28.84%	
Plurality		414	9.37%	
Total votes		4,418	100.0%	
General Election, November 2, 1906
Republican	Isaac T. Bishop	4,978	47.46%	−1.57%
Democratic	Michael Higgins	4,392	41.88%	−6.58%
Social Democratic	W. W. Britton	1,116	10.64%	
Prohibition	Otis Wells Johnson (incumbent)	2	0.02%	
Plurality		586	5.59%	+5.01%
Total votes		10,488	100.0%	-15.62%
Republican hold				

Wisconsin Senate, 3rd District Election, 1910
Party	Candidate	Votes	%	±%
Republican Primary, September 6, 1910
Republican	Isaac T. Bishop (incumbent)	3,656	56.46%	
Republican	Charles H. Everett	2,819	43.54%	
Plurality		837	12.93%	
Total votes		6,475	100.0%	
General Election, November 8, 1910
Republican	Isaac T. Bishop (incumbent)	5,319	76.79%	+29.32%
Social Democratic	S. S. Walkup	1,453	20.98%	+10.34%
Prohibition	William R. Hausche	155	2.24%	
Plurality		3,866	55.81%	+50.22%
Total votes		6,927	100.0%	-33.95%
Republican hold				

Wisconsin Senate
Preceded by Otis Wells Johnson	Member of the Wisconsin Senate from the 3rd district January 7, 1907 – January 4, 1915	Succeeded by Charles H. Everett
