= Albert L. Phillips =

19th-century American politician

Member of the Wisconsin Senate from the 3rd district
- In office January 3, 1881 – January 1, 1883
- Preceded by: William Everett Chipman
- Succeeded by: Charles Jonas

Member of the Wisconsin State Assembly from the Racine 1st district
- In office January 4, 1869 – January 2, 1871
- Preceded by: Charles E. Dyer
- Succeeded by: Lucius S. Blake

Personal details
- Born: May 12, 1824 Adams, Massachusetts, U.S.
- Died: 1893 (aged 68–69) Racine, Wisconsin, U.S.
- Resting place: Mound Cemetery, Racine
- Party: Republican
- Spouse: Mary Green Phillips

Albert Liscom Phillips (May 12, 1824 – April 15, 1893) was an American merchant, Republican politician, and Wisconsin pioneer. He served two years each in the Wisconsin Senate (1881–1882) and State Assembly (1869–1870), representing Racine County.

== Biography ==
Phillips was born on May 12, 1824, in Adams, Massachusetts. He came west to Wisconsin in 1850, settling first in Dodge County before moving to Racine in 1856, where he resided for the rest of his life.

== Career ==
Phillips was a member of the Assembly during the 1869 and 1870 sessions before representing the 3rd District in the Senate during the 1881 and 1882 sessions. Additionally, he was a member of the city council and assessor of Racine. He was a Republican.

Phillips was part of a delegation of the Racine County board of supervisors that traveled to other areas of the state to inspect municipal jail facilities as part of a project to build a new Racine County jail. During this travel, Phillips contracted a disease which ultimately resulted in his death. He died at his home in Racine on April 15, 1893.

Wisconsin State Assembly
Preceded by Charles E. Dyer	Member of the Wisconsin State Assembly from the Racine 1st district January 4, 1869 – January 2, 1871	Succeeded by Lucius S. Blake
Wisconsin Senate
Preceded by William Everett Chipman	Member of the Wisconsin Senate from the 3rd district January 3, 1881 – January 2, 1883	Succeeded by Charles Jonas
