= William Everett Chipman =

American politician (1822–1893)

William E. Chipman

Member of the Wisconsin Senate from the 3rd district
- In office January 6, 1879 – January 3, 1881
- Preceded by: Thomas A. Bones
- Succeeded by: Albert L. Phillips

Personal details
- Born: September 27, 1822 Brockville, Upper Canada, British North America
- Died: September 30, 1893 (aged 71) Burlington, Wisconsin, U.S.
- Resting place: Burlington Cemetery, Burlington
- Party: Republican
- Spouses: Susan B. Kathan (m. 1846; died 1850); Martha Powell (m. 1857–1893)
- Occupation: Farmer

William Everett Chipman (September 27, 1822 – September 30, 1893) was a Canadian American immigrant, farmer, Republican politician, and Wisconsin pioneer. He served two years in the Wisconsin Senate, representing Racine County during the 1879 and 1880 terms.

== Biography ==
Chipman was born in Brockville, Upper Canada (modern day Ontario), and was raised there until he was 12. At that age, he emigrated with his parents to the United States and settled at Cicero, Onondaga County, New York, where he completed his education.

In 1846, he went west to the Wisconsin Territory and rented a farm near Burlington, in Racine County. In 1852, he ventured to California with a wagon train. He returned to the Midwest in 1856, residing in Kankakee County, Illinois, until 1864, when he returned to Burlington and made a permanent settlement. He purchased a farm on Browns Lake, and erected a home which became his primary residence for the rest of his life.

Chipman was elected to the Wisconsin Senate in 1878, running on the Republican Party ticket. He represented the 3rd Senate district, which then comprised all of Racine County, and served in the 1879 and 1880 legislative sessions.

In 1893, Chipman traveled to Ohio with his wife, but had to return due to poor health. He died at his home near Burlington on September 30, 1893.
