= Racine County Insane Asylum =

Former hospital in Wisconsin, United States

Coordinates: 42°42′13.40″N 87°50′59.60″W

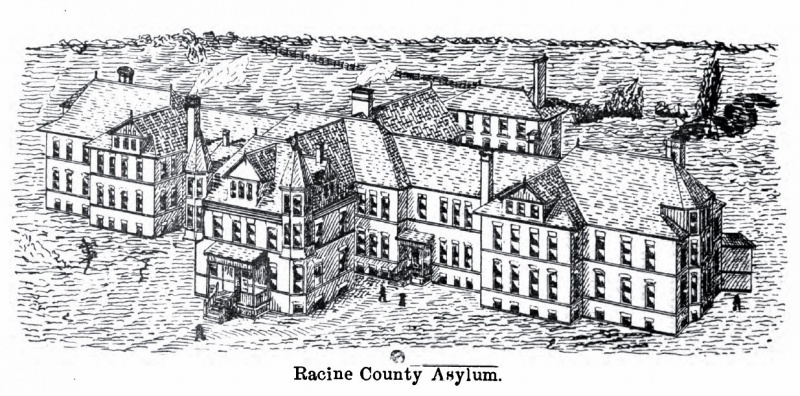
Engraving of the building, 1892

The Racine County Insane Asylum was a mental hospital, operated by the County of Racine, Wisconsin, from 1889 to the 1970s.

== History ==
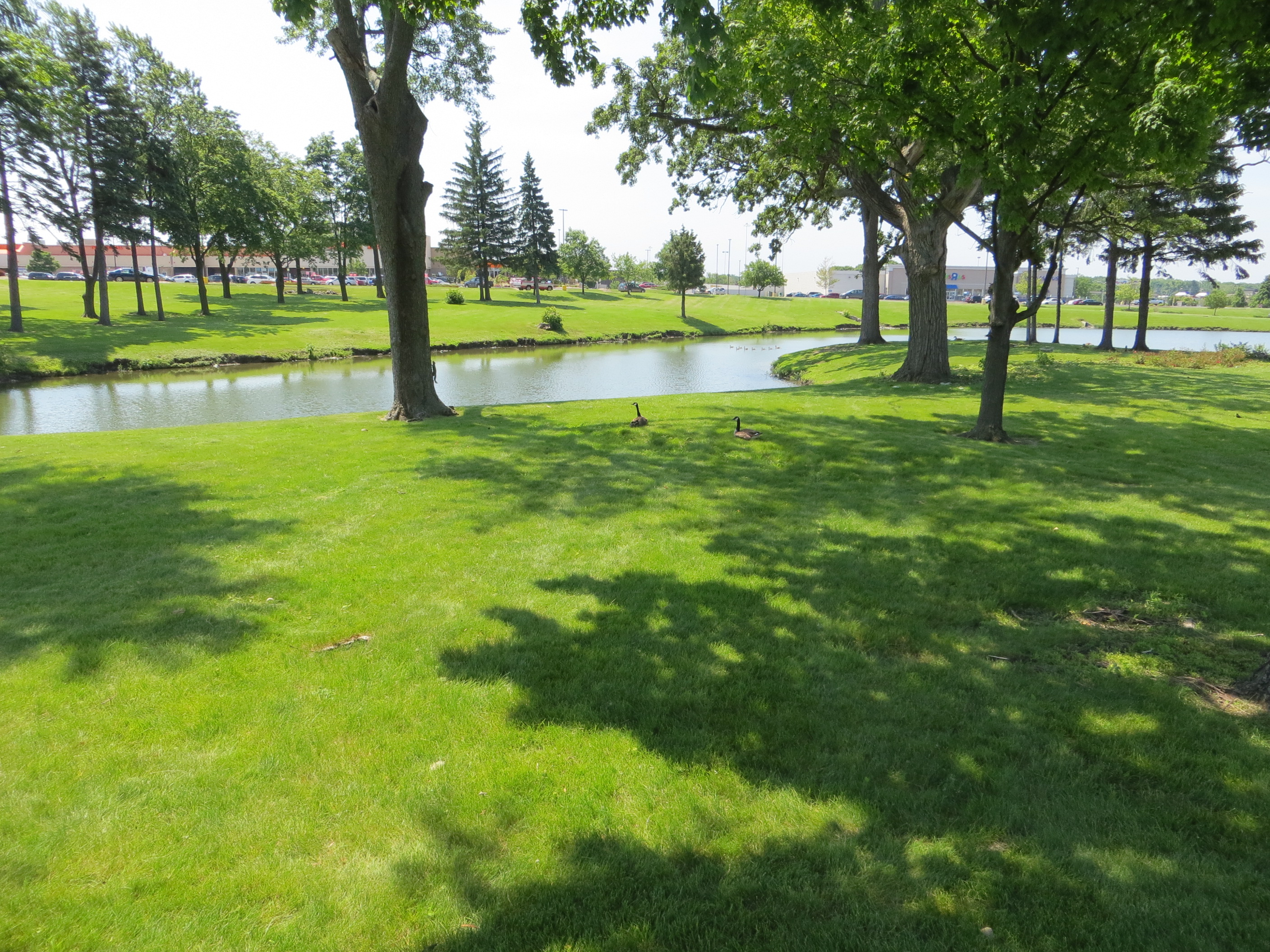
Former asylum pond and grounds

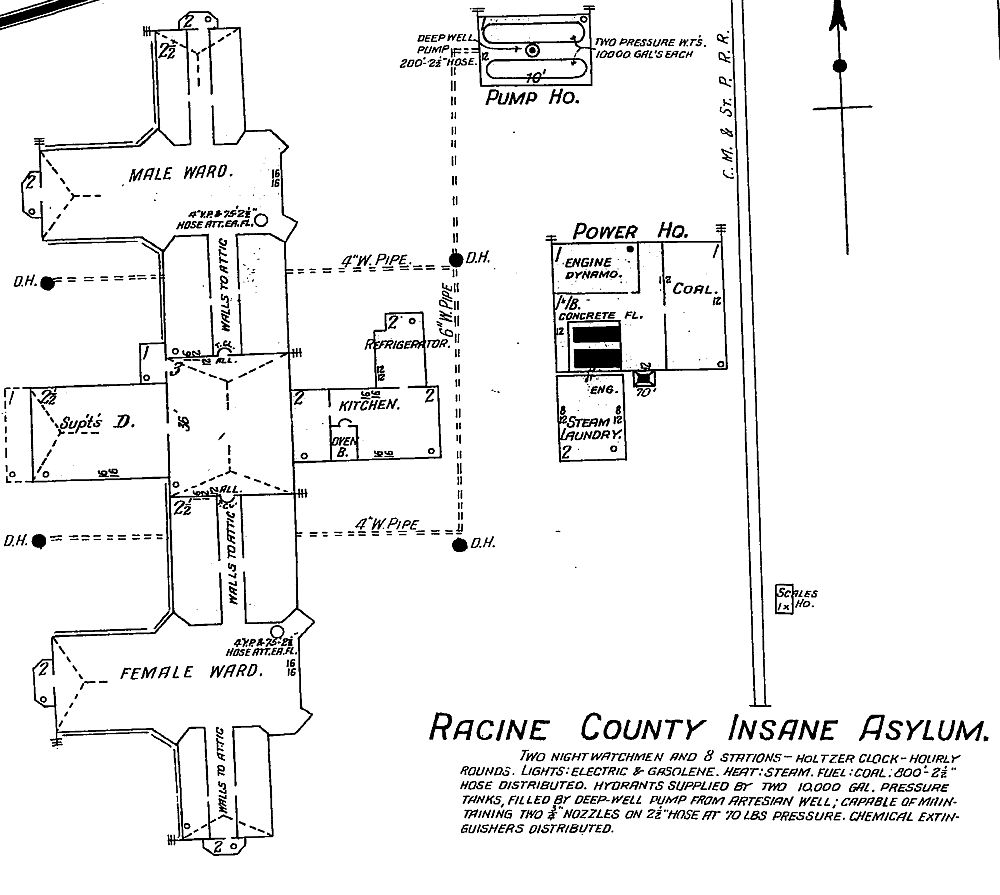
Map, 1908

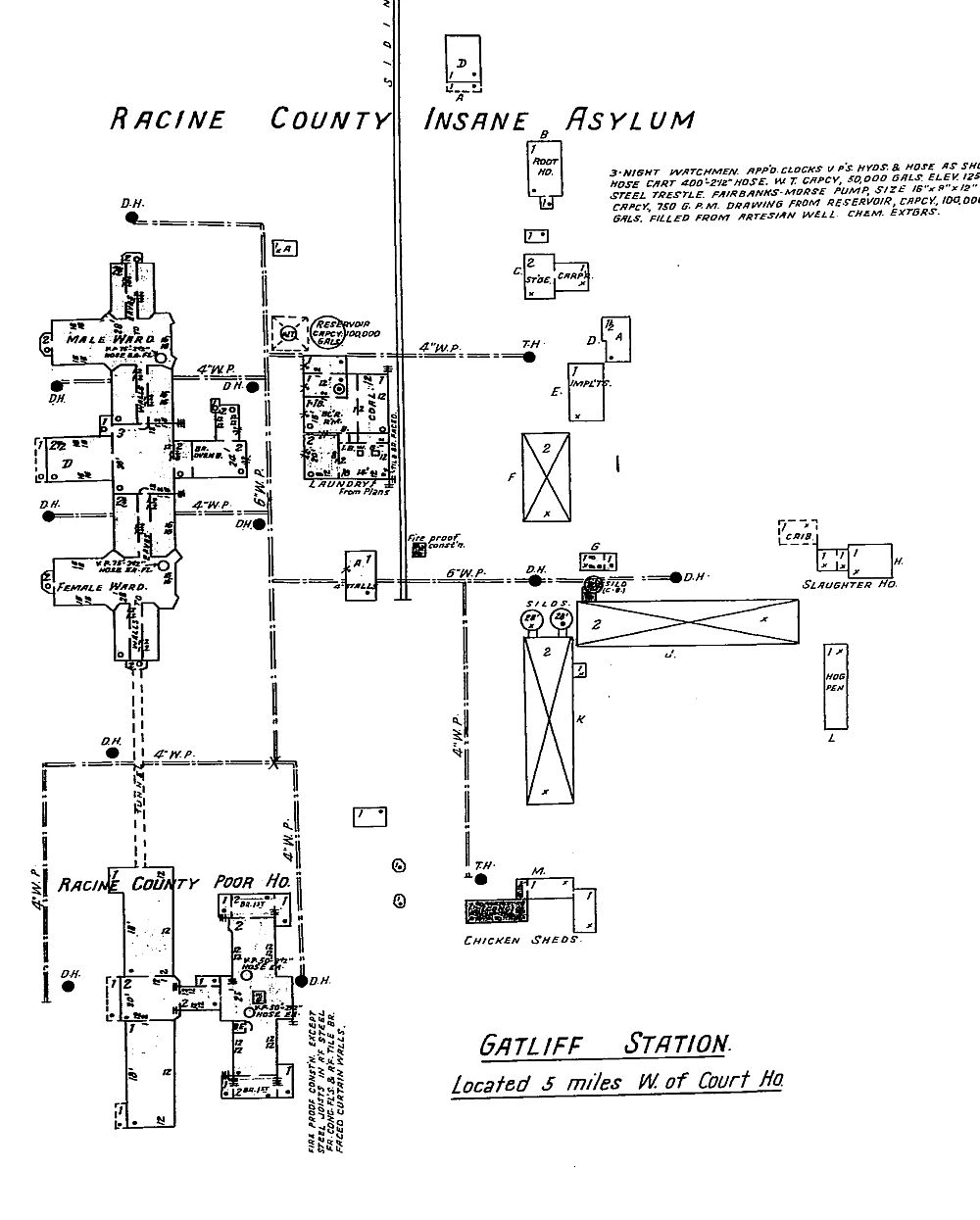
Map, 1933

The first insane patients were admitted to the Racine county poorhouse in 1855. The construction of a separate building for the insane was approved by the county board of supervisors on November 26, 1888. The asylum admitted its first three patients on December 18, 1889. By 1904, the hospital housed 133 patients. On February 19 of that year, the building was destroyed in a fire. The asylum was rebuilt quickly after the fire, and a home for the county poor was added to the facility in 1918. The institution was also known as the Gatliff Asylum and was served by the Gatliff stop on the railroad. Gatliff was named after Nelson Gatliff (1813–1898), an early pioneer in Racine County who owned extensive farmland. The facility was also used as a tuberculosis sanatorium. Later it was known as High Ridge Hospitals and High Ridge Health Care Center of Racine County. It was closed on October 1, 1986, at which time the approximately 210 residents who were there were moved to the new Ridgewood Health Care Center. Asbestos removal in, then demolition of, High Ridge Health Care Center began in October 1988, to be completed by early 1989. The site is now a retail development known as High Ridge Centre, with only the old duck pond remaining from the former asylum.
