= William P. Packard =

American politician

William P. Packard (December 13, 1838 in Chatham Township, Ohio – ?), was a member of the Wisconsin State Assembly. He settled in Racine, Wisconsin in 1854.

== Political career ==
Packard was a member of the Assembly during the 1880 and 1883 sessions. Other positions he held include Racine alderman in 1876 and 1878 and Mayor of Racine. He was a Democrat.
