= Wallace Ingalls =

American politician (1859–1936)

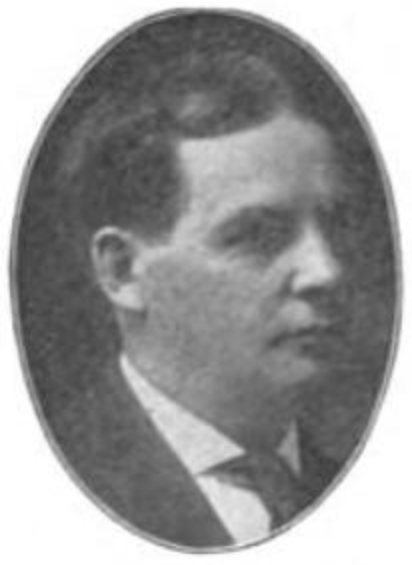

Member of the Wisconsin State Assembly
- Constituency: Racine County First District
- In office 1908–1910
- In office 1920–1922
- In office 1924–1930

Personal details
- Born: November 22, 1859 Linn, Wisconsin
- Died: February 3, 1936 (aged 76) Linn, Wisconsin
- Party: Republican
- Education: Albany Law School
- Occupation: Lawyer, politician

Wallace Ingalls (November 22, 1859 – February 3, 1936) was an American lawyer and politician.

Ingalls was born in the town of Linn, Walworth County, Wisconsin, on November 22, 1859. (Note: His obituary in The Racine Journal-Times and his biography in the 1929 Wisconsin Blue Book both give his birth date as November 22, 1859, but his biography in the 1909 Wisconsin Blue Book gives his birth date as November 21, 1859.) Ingalls received his law degree from Albany Law School. He was the district attorney of Walworth County, Wisconsin from 1892 to 1896 and was a Republican. Ingalls practiced law in Sharon, Wisconsin, then in Elkhorn, Wisconsin and later moved to Racine, Wisconsin and practiced law there. He was also a farmer. Ingalls served in the Wisconsin State Assembly in 1909, 1921, and from 1925 to 1929. Ingalls died of a heart attack in 1936 at his home in the Town of Linn, in Walworth County, Wisconsin.
