= John Dixon (Wisconsin politician) =

American politician

John Dixon (January 31, 1853 – May 2, 1938) was an American politician and businessman.

== Early life and career ==
Born on a farm in the town of Brighton, Kenosha County, Wisconsin, Dixon was educated in the public schools. He was elected Brighton Town Clerk. In 1877, Dixon moved to Union Grove, Wisconsin where he owned a hardware retail business. He then moved to Racine, Wisconsin and continued to work in the hardware business until 1912.

From 1893 to 1899, Dixon served as Racine County clerk on the Republican Party ticket. From 1903 to 1904 and from 1915 to 1919, Dixon served in the Wisconsin State Assembly from Racine County.

== Death ==
Dixon died at his winter home in Orlando, Florida.
