= Richard B. Bates =

American politician

Richard B. Bates (August 17, 1843 – 1910) was a member of the Wisconsin State Assembly.

== Early life ==
Bates was born on August 17, 1843, in West Troy, New York, now known as Watervliet. He died in 1910. He was educated in the public school system, finishing his secondary schooling in Fort Edward, New York. In the spring of 1856, Bates relocated to Delavan, Wisconsin. In 1857, Bates lived in Darien, Wisconsin, before moving back to Delavan in 1862. In March 1865, Bates moved to Milwaukee to work as a bookkeeper, before moving back to Delavan in June 1867 to manage his father's lumber business following his death in 1866. He sold the lot in Delavan and purchased a lumber yard in Racine, where he remained.

== Career ==
Bates was elected to the Wisconsin State Assembly in 1871. He was a Democrat.
