= Norton J. Field =

American politician

Member of the Wisconsin State Assembly
- In office 1876–1881

Personal details
- Born: September 26, 1839 Elba, New York, U.S.
- Died: after 1881
- Education: Racine College
- Occupation: Republican

Military service
- Allegiance: United States
- Branch/service: Union Army
- Years of service: American Civil War
- Rank: first sergeant
- Unit: 2nd Wisconsin Volunteer Infantry Regiment

Norton J. Field (September 26, 1839 – after 1881) was a member of the Wisconsin State Assembly.

== Biography ==
Field was born on September 26, 1839, in Elba, New York. In 1857, he graduated from Racine College. During the American Civil War, Field served with the 2nd Wisconsin Volunteer Infantry Regiment of the Union Army. He achieved the rank of first sergeant.

== Political career ==
Field was a member of the Assembly during the 1876, 1877, 1879 and 1881 sessions. He was a Republican.
