= Stephen A. Harrison =

American politician (1829–1898)

Member of the Wisconsin State Assembly
- In office January 4, 1875 – January 3, 1876
- Preceded by: A. Warren Phelps
- Succeeded by: Bernard F. Cooke
- Constituency: Milwaukee 4th district
- In office January 3, 1870 – January 2, 1871
- Preceded by: Patrick Drew
- Succeeded by: James Stephen White
- Constituency: Milwaukee 1st district

Personal details
- Born: September 18, 1829 England, UK
- Died: June 7, 1898 (aged 68) Milwaukee, Wisconsin, U.S.
- Resting place: Forest Home Cemetery, Milwaukee
- Party: Republican
- Spouses: Martha Gardiner (died 1881); Alice Dudley Ward (m. 1882–1898)
- Children: Martha Emma Harrison^{(b. 1849; died 1935)}; Harriet Louisa (Green)^{(b. 1850; died 1940)}; Mary Ann (West)^{(b. 1851; died 1919)}; Bessie D. (Keihle)^{(b. 1854; died 1934)}; Ida Maria (Atkins)^{(b. 1856; died 1919)}
- Occupation: Contractor

Stephen A. Harrison (September 18, 1829 – June 7, 1898) was an English American immigrant, construction contractor, Republican politician, and Wisconsin pioneer. He served two terms in the Wisconsin State Assembly, representing downtown Milwaukee during the 1870 and 1875 terms. He also served on the Milwaukee Common Council.

== Biography ==
Stephen A. Harrison was born in England in September 1829. He received a common school education there before emigrating to the United States in 1853. He first arrived in Milwaukee, Wisconsin, in 1854, but was not initially encouraged by the business climate. He traveled around the region for the next two years, but ultimately decided to return to Milwaukee.

A building contractor by trade, he formed a partnership with William Clark, known as Harrison & Clark. They became a major building contractor in Milwaukee, and in 1861 they bid for the contract to build the west wing of the third Wisconsin State Capitol then under construction in Madison—their bid was not selected. During these years though, he did construct the first headquarters of the Northwestern Mutual insurance company and the main building of the Milwaukee Soldiers Home.

Harrison made his first run for Wisconsin State Assembly in 1862, running on the Republican Party ticket. He lost the general election to Democrat John Sharpstein.

In the Spring of 1869, he was elected to a two year term on the Milwaukee Common Council. That fall, he was elected to represent Milwaukee County's 1st district in the Wisconsin State Assembly, defeating Democrat Edward Keogh by 45 votes.

In 1874, he ran for Wisconsin Assembly again. The districts had been redrawn since his previous term, and in 1874 he resided in what was then Milwaukee County's 4th district. The incumbent, Liberal Republican A. Warren Phelps, was running for re-election on the Reform ticket. Harrison initially seemed poised to easily receive the Republican nomination, but when he made it clear he would not vote for the re-election of Matthew H. Carpenter as U.S. senator in the next session of the legislature, a movement of Carpenter allies began to try to deny him the nomination. Carpenter's camp supported city councilmember Julius Wechselberg for the nomination, but Harrison ultimately prevailed at the district convention. Wechselberg then entered the general election as an independent candidate. Harrison narrowly prevailed with 47.5% of the vote, Wechselberg received 36.5%; Phelps received just 16%.

In the 1870s and 1880s, Harrison became a major railroad construction contractor in southeast Wisconsin, constructing roughly 1,100 miles of track for the Chicago, Milwaukee & St. Paul Railroad, and also taking contracts for the Wisconsin Central Railroad.

Harrison died at his home in Milwaukee on June 7, 1898.

== Electoral history ==
=== Wisconsin Assembly (1869) ===
Wisconsin Assembly, Milwaukee County 1st District Election, 1869
Party	Candidate	Votes	%	±%
General Election, November 2, 1869
Republican	Stephen A. Harrison	395	53.02%	
Democratic	Edward Keogh	350	46.98%	
Plurality		45	6.04%	
Total votes		745	100.0%	
Republican gain from Democratic				

=== Wisconsin Assembly (1874) ===
Wisconsin Assembly, Milwaukee County 4th District Election, 1874
Party	Candidate	Votes	%	±%
General Election, November 3, 1874
Republican	Stephen A. Harrison	831	47.54%	
Independent Republican	Julius Wechselberg	638	36.50%	
Reform	A. Warren Phelps (incumbent)	279	15.96%	
Plurality		193	11.04%	
Total votes		1,748	100.0%	
Republican gain from Liberal Republican				

Wisconsin State Assembly
Preceded by Patrick Drew	Member of the Wisconsin State Assembly Milwaukee 1st district January 3, 1870 – January 2, 1871	Succeeded by James Stephen White
Preceded by A. Warren Phelps	Member of the Wisconsin State Assembly Milwaukee 4th district January 4, 1875 – January 3, 1876	Succeeded by Bernard F. Cooke
