= Race track =

Facility built for racing of animals, vehicles, or athletes

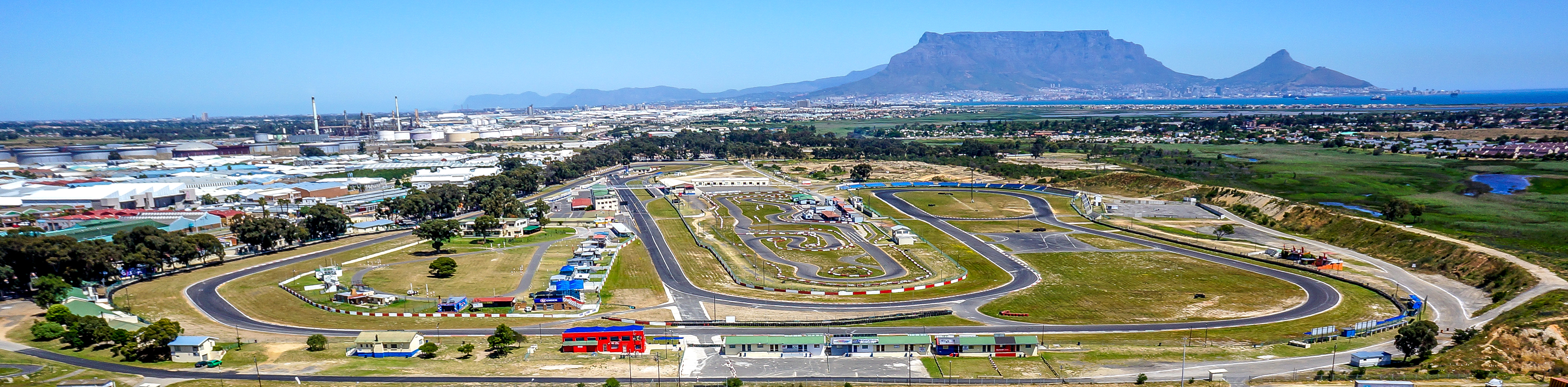
An aerial view of the Killarney motorsport race track in Cape Town, South Africa

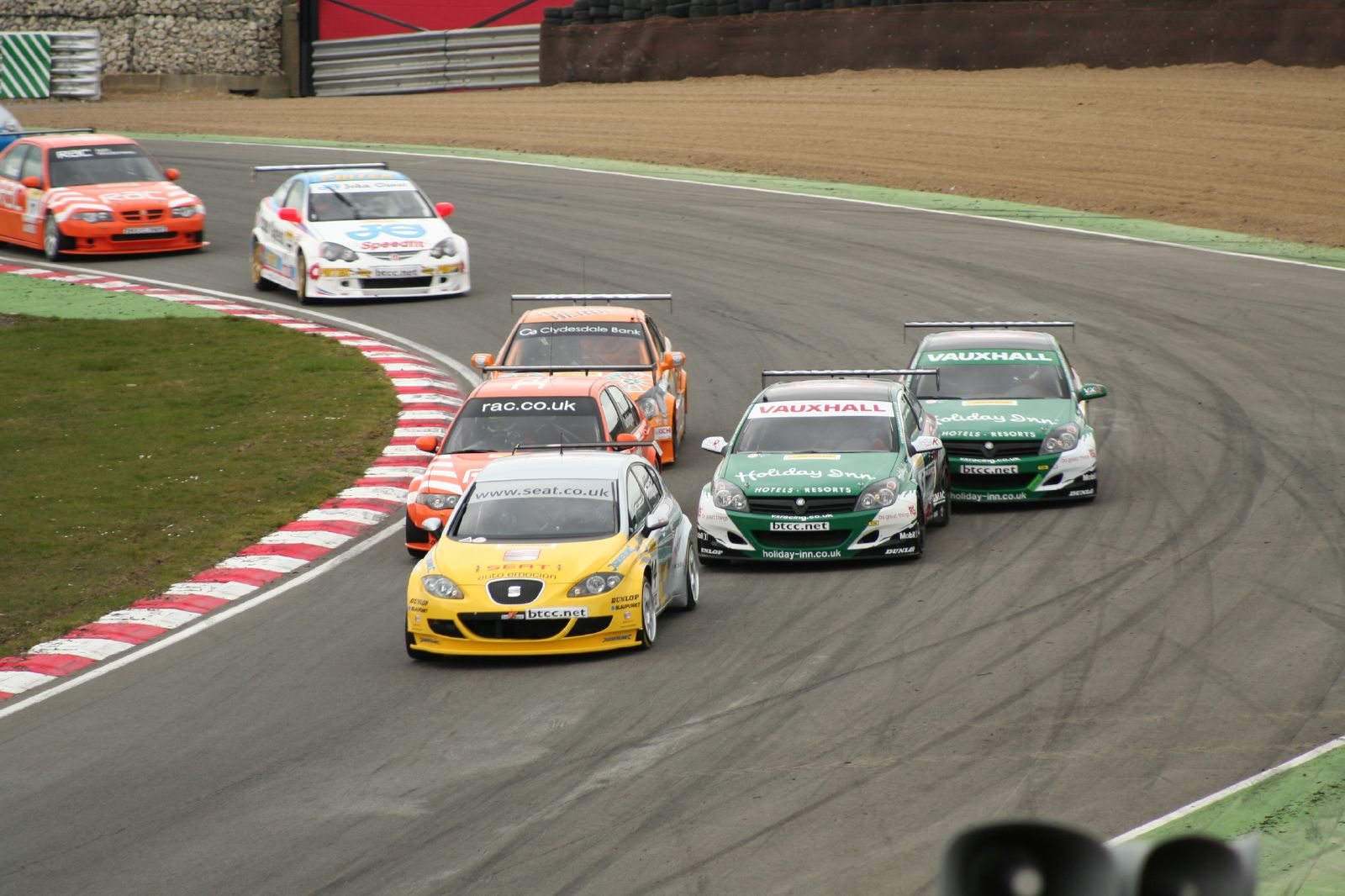
Touring Car race at Brands Hatch circuit

A race track (racetrack, racing track, racing circuit or autodrome) is a facility built for racing of vehicles, athletes, or animals (e.g. horse racing or greyhound racing). A race track also may feature grandstands or concourses. Race tracks are also used in the study of animal locomotion.

A racetrack is a permanent facility or building. Racecourse is an alternate term for a horse racing track, found in countries such as the United Kingdom, India, Australia, Hong Kong, and the United Arab Emirates. Race tracks built for bicycles are known as velodromes. Circuit is a common alternate term for race track, given the circuit configuration of most race tracks, allowing races to occur over several laps. Some race tracks may also be known as speedways, or raceways.

A race course, as opposed to a racecourse, is a nonpermanent track for sports, particularly road running, water sports, road racing, or rallying. Many sports usually held on race tracks also can occur on temporary tracks, such as the Monaco and Singapore Grands Prix in Formula One.

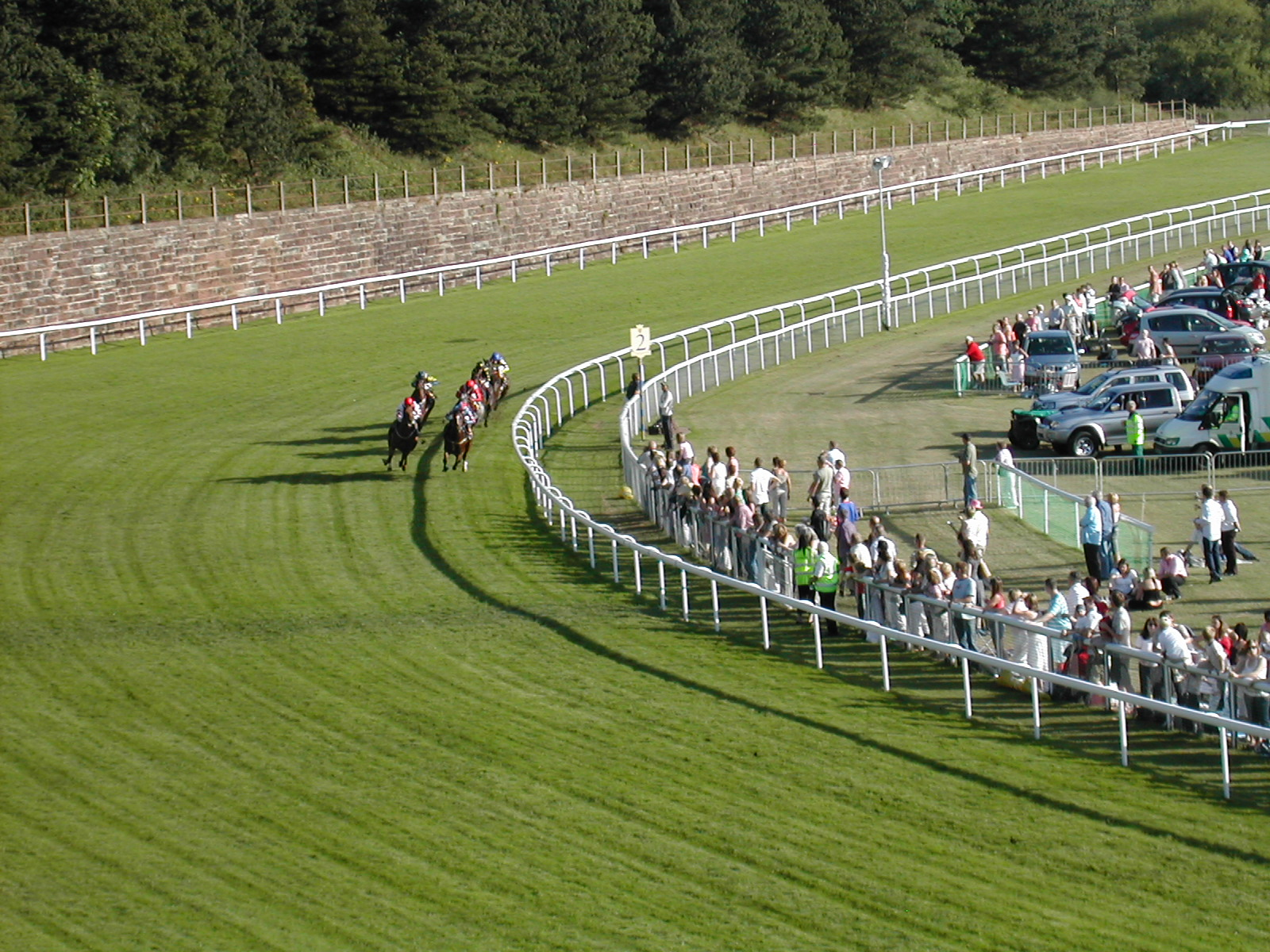
A typical racecourse

== History ==
Some evidence remains of racetracks being developed in several ancient civilizations. The most developed ancient race tracks were the hippodromes of the Ancient Greeks and the circuses (circi) of the Roman Empire. Both of these structures were designed for horse and chariot racing. The stadium of the Circus Maximus in Ancient Rome could hold 200,000 spectators.

Racing facilities existed during the Middle Ages, and records exist of a public racecourse being opened at Newmarket, in London, in 1174. In 1780, the Earl of Derby created a horse-racing course on his estate at Epsom; the English Derby continues to be held there today. Racecourses in the British Isles are based on grass, known as turf tracks. In the United States, the race tracks are soil.

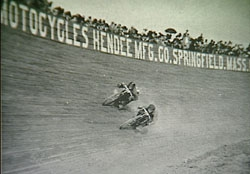
Motorcycles racing on a highly banked board track in 1911

With the advent of the automobile in the late 19th and early 20th centuries, race tracks were designed to suit the nature of powered machines. The earliest tracks were modified horse-racing courses. Racing automobiles in such facilities began in September 1896, at Narragansett Park in Cranston, Rhode Island. The Indianapolis Motor Speedway was opened in August 1909.

Beginning in the early 1900s, motorcycle races were run on high, banked, wooden race tracks called board tracks. During the 1920s, many of the races on the AAA Championship circuit were run on such board tracks. Modern racetracks are designed with spectator safety being paramount, following incidents of spectator and track marshals fatalities. These often involve run-off areas, barriers, and high fencing.

== Sports ==
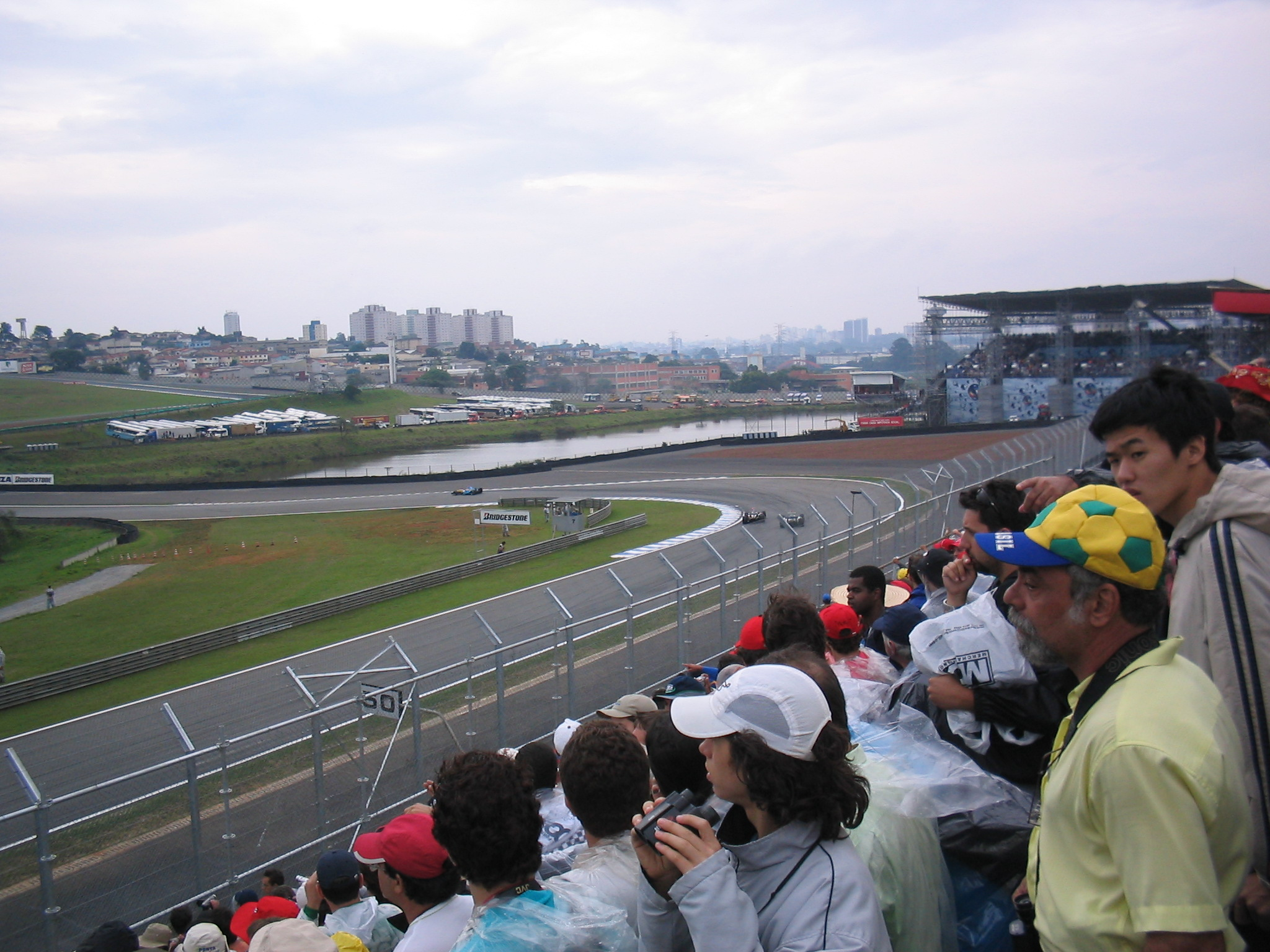
Autódromo José Carlos Pace Racetrack showing safety fencing

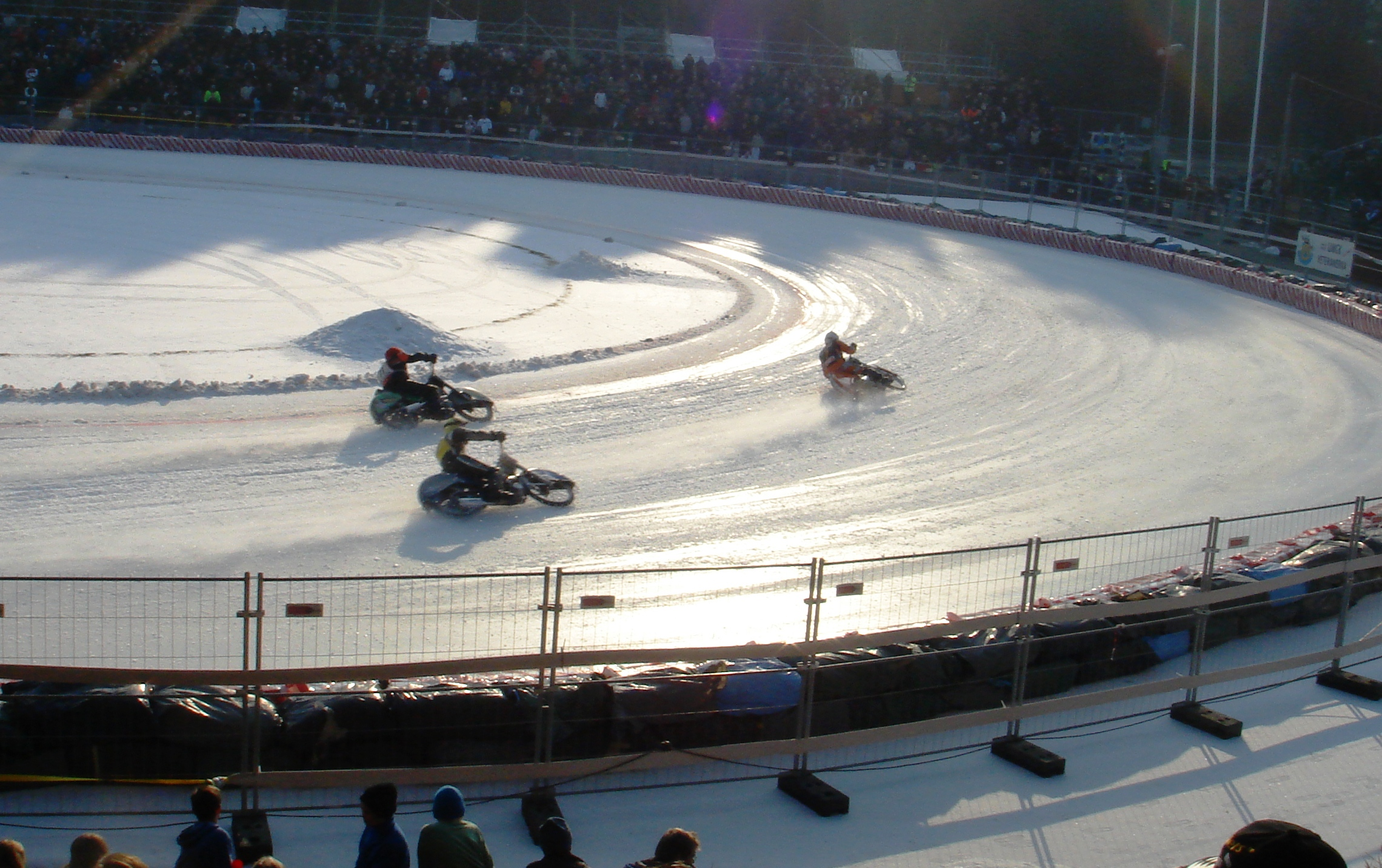
Motorcycle ice racing

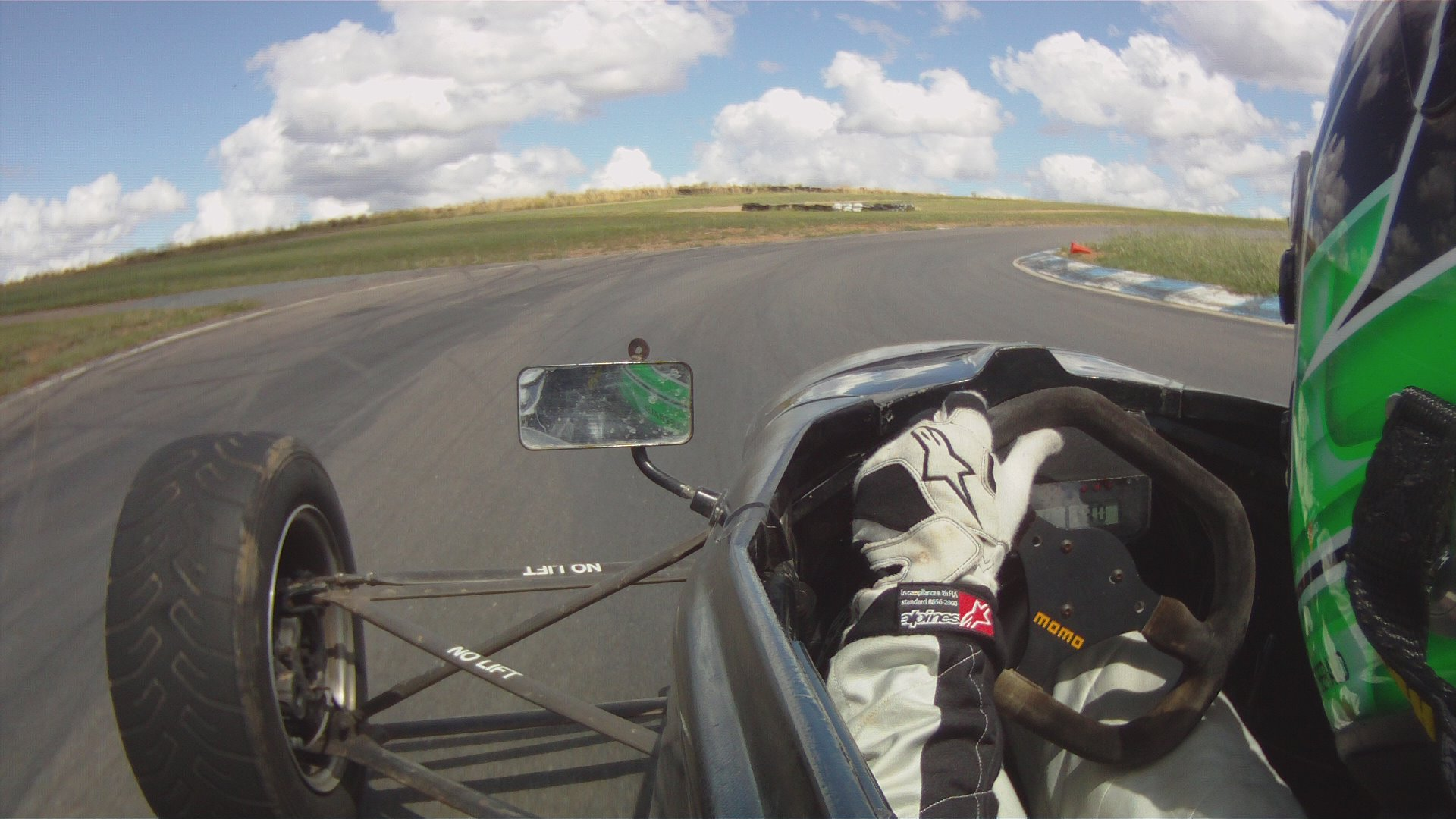
View of a race track from a race car at Wakefield Park, Australia

Racetracks are used for:

=== Animal sports ===
- Camel racing
- Greyhound racing
- Harness racing
- Horse racing

=== Human sports ===
- Bobsleigh
- Cycle sport
- Skeleton (sport)
- Track and field

=== Motor sports ===
- Auto racing
- Drag racing
- Kart racing
- Motorcycle racing
- Stock car racing
- Track racing (motorcycles)
- Truck racing
- Drift racing

== Configurations ==
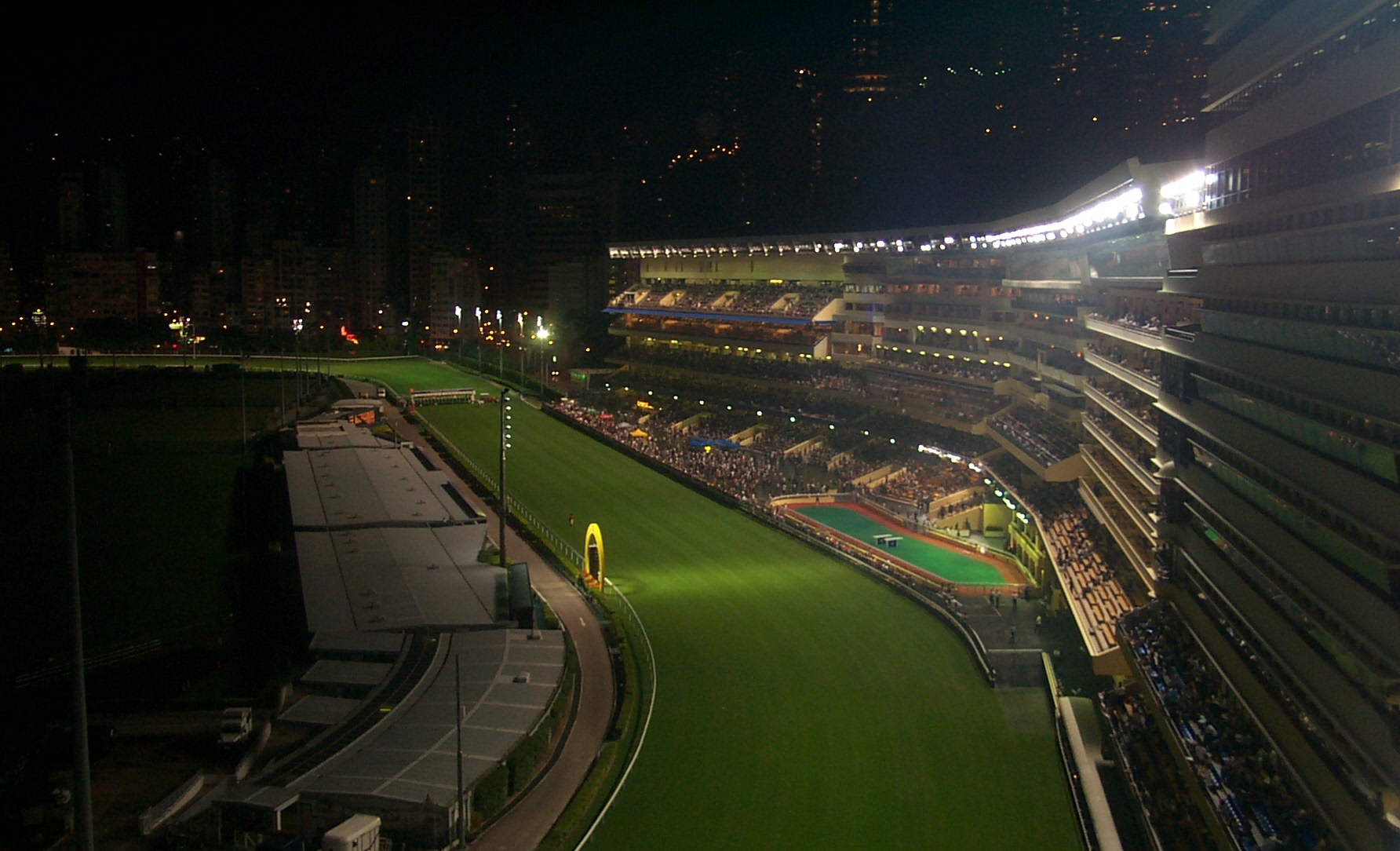
Horseracing track, Happy Valley Racecourse in Hong Kong, showing grandstands

Some racetracks offer little in the way of permanent infrastructure other than the track; others incorporate spectator facilities such as grandstands, hospitality or facilities for competitors, such as pit lanes and garages, paddocks and stables. Several racetracks are incorporated into larger venues or complexes, incorporating golf courses, museums, hotels, and conference centres. Some racetracks are small enough to be contained indoors, for sports such as motocross, track cycling, and athletics.

Many racetracks are multi-use, allowing different types of sport on the same track, or incorporating many tracks in one venue. Commonly, running tracks are incorporated within general use or soccer stadiums, either permanently visible or covered by stands or pitches.

Many horse and motorsport tracks are configurable, allowing different routes or sections. Some venues contain smaller tracks inside larger ones, with access tunnels and bridges for spectators. Some racetracks incorporate a short course and a longer course which uses part of the shorter one, usually the main straight, such as Brands Hatch. The Le Mans road race venue is centred on a smaller permanent circuit within its complex.

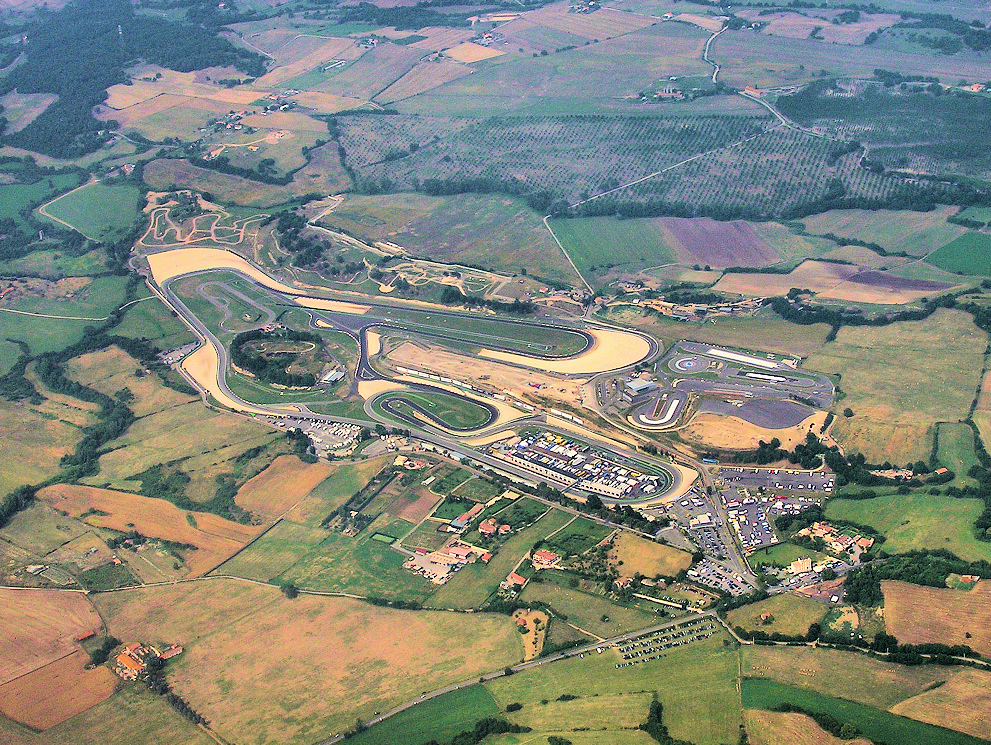
The ACI Vallelunga car racing track near Rome, Italy, a typical meandering layout with run-off areas

== Surfaces ==
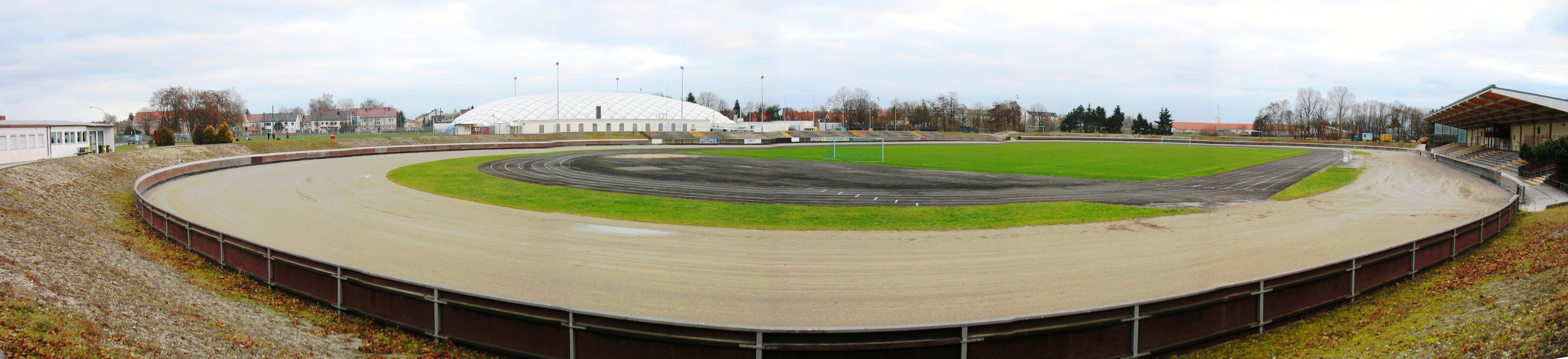
Stadion Haunstetten, a sand track

Surfaces include:

- All-weather running track (Tartan) (athletics)
- Artificial turf (electric radio controlled off-road racing)
- Asphalt/tarmac (motorsports, athletics, cycling)
- Carpet (electric radio controlled racing)
- Concrete (motorsports)
- Dirt (horses, greyhounds, automobiles, motorbikes (track racing), stock cars, radio controlled off-road racing, cycling)
- Grass (horses, amateur motorsports, cross country running)
- Ice (speed skating – when on dirt tracks, bobsleighs, speed skating, ice motor racing)
- Sand (horses, camels, greyhounds, rally raid)
- Wood (track cycling, board track racing – now defunct)

== Motorsport ==
Race tracks are primarily designed for road racing competition through speed, featuring defined start-finish lines or posts, and sometimes even a series of defined timing points that divide the track into time sectors. A racetrack for cars (i.e. a car track) is a closed circuit, instead of a street circuit utilizing temporarily closed public roads.

Race tracks can host individual or team sports. Racetracks can feature rolling starts, or fixed starts, with associated equipment (starting blocks, cages, wheel traps etc.) They invariably feature a pit lane, and usually timing equipment.

=== Track layout ===
Some car tracks are of an oval shape, and can be banked, which allows almost universal spectator views or high speed racing (cycling, stock cars). A famous one is Nardò where high-speed manufacturer testing often takes place, and the Indianapolis Motor Speedway. Some oval tracks are variations on an oval shape, for practical reasons or to introduce varying difficulties such as Talladega (a tri-oval). Most race tracks have meandering circuits with many curves, chicanes and changes in height, to allow for a challenge in skill to the competitors, notably motocross and touring car racing – these tend to predominate throughout most of the world, but especially in Europe.

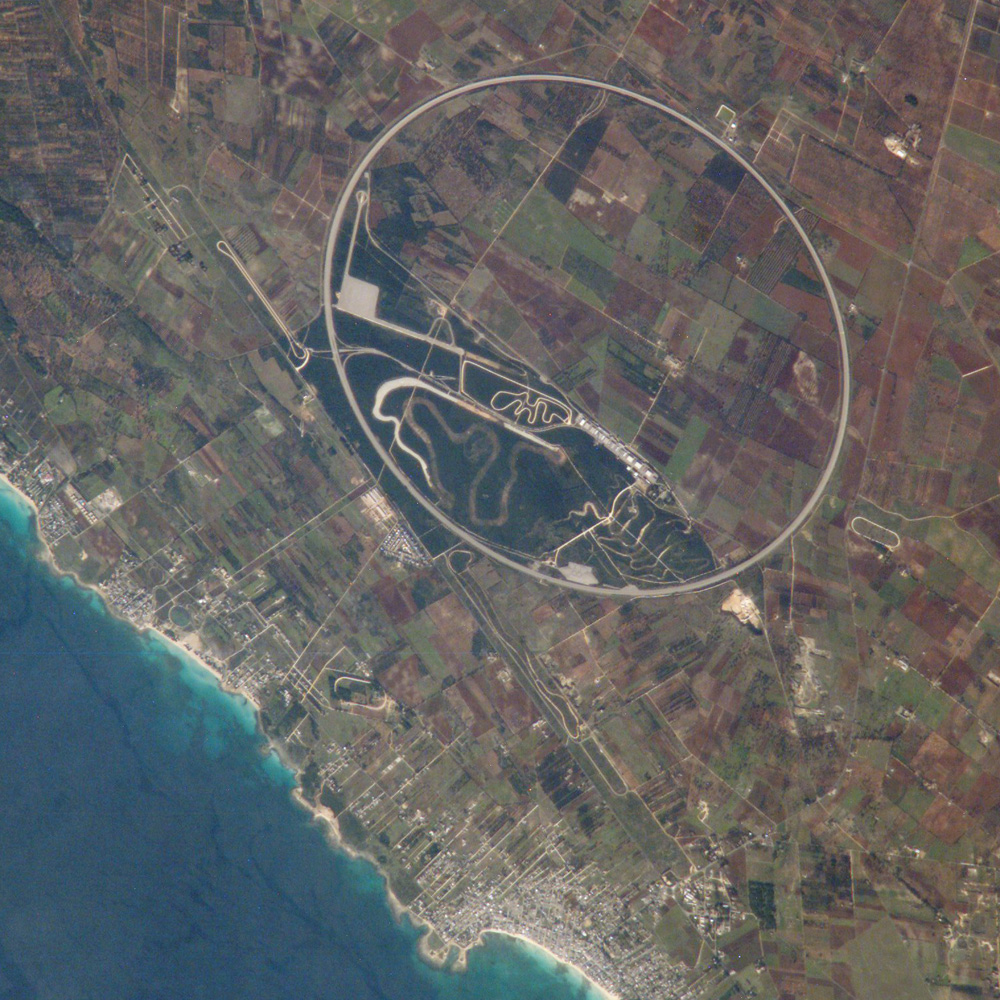
Photograph from space of Nardò Ring in Italy, it is 12.6 kilometres (7.8 mi) long and is perfectly round – the image was taken from the ISS at an angle making it appear elliptical.

=== Road circuits ===
Flatter meandering motorsport courses are sometimes called 'road circuits', originating in the fact that the earliest road racing circuits were simply closed-off public roads. Some car racetracks are specifically configured in a long straight, namely drag racing.

True road circuits are still in use, e.g. the Australian GP has been run in Adelaide and continues to be in Melbourne on regular city streets. The most famous of these are the Monaco GP, and the Circuit de la Sarthe circuit in Le Mans, France. These are not permanent facilities built for racing (although parts of the Circuit de la Sarthe are purpose-built, and closed to the public).

=== Converted airfields ===
After World War II, many wartime airfields, particularly in Great Britain where numerous airfields where used by RAF and USAAF for bombing runs in continental Europe, were left without further use. The Berlin Air Lift and later Cold War purposes required personnel with experience in quickly repairing and maintaining modern aircraft made of aluminium or even titanium. This coincided with a post-war boom in motorsport, and many airfields were converted to race tracks, where the circuit layout usually combined parts of the runways and the surrounding perimeter taxiways.

The famous British track at Silverstone is a former Class A airfield, as are Castle Combe and Goodwood. The long runways were perfect for drag strips, one was converted into the permanent Santa Pod Raceway quartermile. This type of track also appears on the popular motoring show Top Gear, which is filmed at Dunsfold Aerodrome. The 1964 Austrian Grand Prix was held at Zeltweg Air Base, then a permanent circuit was built nearby, currently named Red Bull Ring. Not exactly a converted airfield racetrack, but closely related to the history of aviation, is the famous 24h race track of Le Mans. The Circuit des 24 Heures du Mans paddock is located between the Le Mans Airfield and the Hunaudières racecourse which in 1908 was the site of Wright brothers flight demonstrations.

== See also ==
- Animal locomotion
- Auto racing
- List of motor racing circuits by FIA grade
- List of horse racing venues
