= J. I. Case =

J. I. Case may refer to:

- Case Corporation — the tractor manufacturer formerly known as the J. I. Case Company
- Jerome Case (1819–1891) — Jerome Increase Case, farm machinery maker and racehorse owner; founder of J. I. Case Company
- Jackson Irving Case (1865–1903) — son of Jerome Case
- Jerome I. Case High School — a Wisconsin high school also known as "J.I. Case" or "Racine Case"
