= Aaron Van Schaick Cochrane =

American politician (1858-1943)

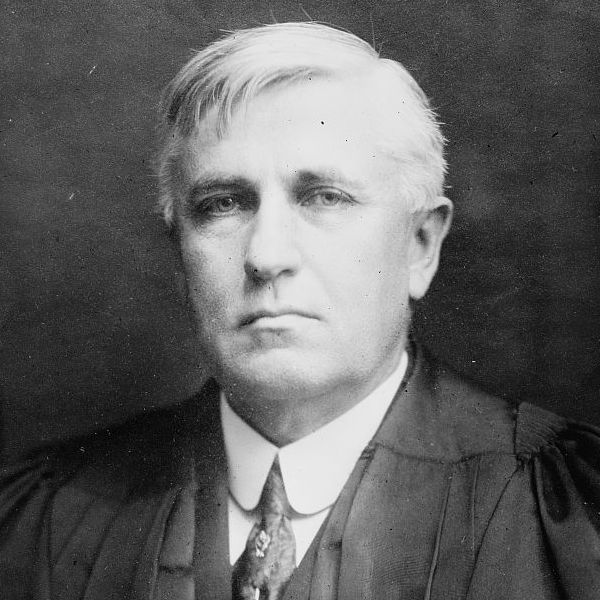

Justice of the New York Supreme Court
- In office January 1, 1902 – January 18, 1928
Court roles
Presiding Justice of the New York Supreme Court, Appellate Division, 3rd department
In office January 1, 1922 – January 18, 1928
Appointed by	Nathan L. Miller
Preceded by	John M. Kellogg
Succeeded by	Charles C. Van Kirk
Associate Justice of the New York Supreme Court, Appellate Division, 3rd department
In office 1906 – January 1, 1922
Appointed by	Frank W. Higgins
Succeeded by	Charles C. Van Kirk
Justice of the New York Supreme Court for the 3rd department
In office January 1, 1902 – 1906

Member of the U.S. House of Representatives from New York's 19th district
- In office March 4, 1897 – March 3, 1901
- Preceded by: Frank S. Black
- Succeeded by: William H. Draper

Personal details
- Born: March 14, 1858 Coxsackie, New York, U.S.
- Died: September 7, 1943 (aged 85) Hudson, New York, U.S.
- Party: Republican
- Relatives: Isaac W. Van Schaick (uncle)

Aaron Van Schaick Cochrane (March 14, 1858 – September 7, 1943) was an American lawyer, judge, and Republican politician from Columbia County, New York. He served 26 years as a judge of the New York Supreme Court, serving four years as a trial judge in the 3rd judicial district, then serving 22 years as a justice of the Appellate Division, 3rd department. From 1922 until his retirement in 1928, he was presiding justice in the 3rd department.

Before his judicial service, he served two terms in the U.S. House of Representatives, representing New York's 19th congressional district from 1897 to 1901. Earlier, he also served as district attorney of Columbia County and city judge of Hudson, New York. His name was often abbreviated as A. V. S. Cochrane.

His uncle, Isaac Whitbeck Van Schaick, was also a member of Congress, representing Milwaukee County, Wisconsin, for two terms in the 1880s.

== Biography ==
Born in Coxsackie, New York, Cochrane attended the common schools and the Hudson River Institute at Claverack, New York. He graduated from Yale College in 1879. He moved to Hudson, New York, in 1879, where he studied law. He was admitted to the bar in 1881 and commenced practice in Hudson, New York. He served as city judge of Hudson in 1887 and 1888. He served as district attorney of Columbia County 1889–1892.

Cochrane was elected as a Republican to the Fifty-fifth and Fifty-sixth Congresses (March 4, 1897 – March 3, 1901) as the representative of New York's 19th congressional district. He was not a candidate for renomination in 1900, but was elected associate justice of the Supreme Court of New York in 1901. He was re-elected in 1915 for another 14-year term, and was designated by Gov. Nathan L. Miller as Presiding Justice of the Appellate Division in 1922.

Cochrane resigned from the bench in January 1928, but served as official referee until 1941. He died in Hudson, New York, September 7, 1943. He was interred in Riverside Cemetery, Coxsackie, New York.

U.S. House of Representatives
Preceded by Frank S. Black	Member of the U.S. House of Representatives from New York's 19th congressional district March 4, 1897 – March 3, 1901	Succeeded by William H. Draper
Legal offices
Preceded by John M. Kellogg	Presiding Justice of the New York Supreme Court, Appellate Division, 3rd department January 1, 1922 – January 18, 1928	Succeeded by Charles C. Van Kirk
