= James Greeley Flanders =

19th century American lawyer and politician

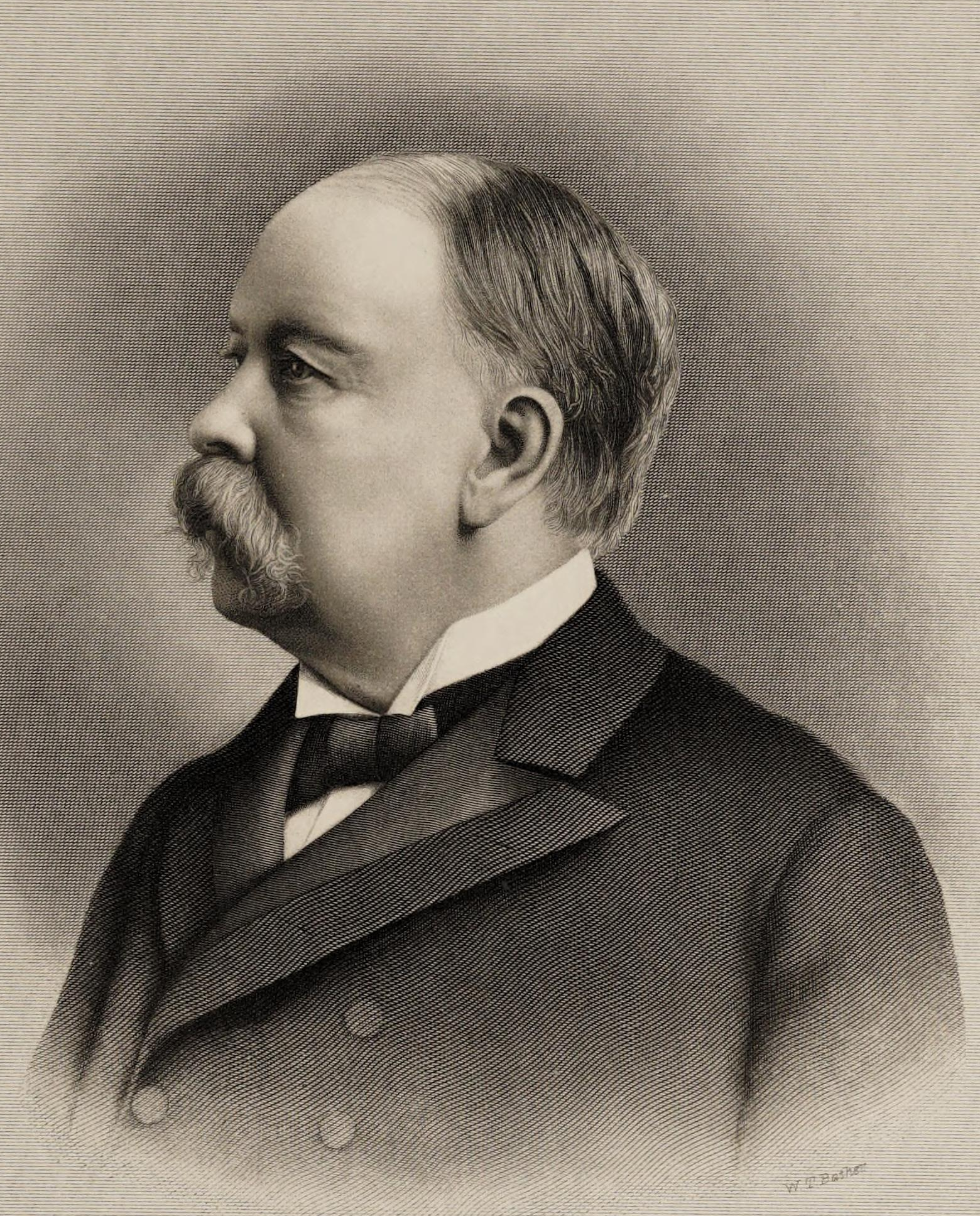

Member of the Wisconsin State Assembly from the Milwaukee 1st district
- In office January 1, 1877 – January 1, 1878
- Preceded by: Patrick Drew
- Succeeded by: Charles T. Burnham

Personal details
- Born: James Greeley Flanders; December 13, 1844 New London, New Hampshire
- Died: January 1, 1920 (aged 75) Milwaukee, Wisconsin
- Resting place: Forest Home Cemetery; Milwaukee, Wisconsin
- Party: Republican
- Spouses: Mary Cornelia Haney; (died 1930)
- Children: Charlotte B. F. (Simpson)^{(b. 1876; died 1944)}; Kent Haney Flanders^{(b. 1878; died 1907)}; Roger Y. Flanders^{(b. 1882; died 1932)}
- Parents: Walter Powers Flanders (father); Susan Everett (Greeley) Flanders (mother)
- Education: Yale College; Columbia Law School

James Greeley Flanders (December 13, 1844 – January 1, 1920) was a member of the Wisconsin State Assembly.

== Biography ==
Flanders was born on December 13, 1844, in New London, New Hampshire. He graduated from Yale College in 1867 and from Columbia Law School in 1869. In 1873, Flanders married Mary C. Haney. They had five children. On January 1, 1920, he died in Milwaukee, Wisconsin due to a severe cold. He was buried at Forest Home Cemetery. Flanders was an Episcopalian.

== Career ==
Flanders was a member of the Assembly during the 1877 session. He was also a school board member, and a delegate to the 1896 Democratic National Convention.

Flanders was a Milwaukee attorney and lifetime friend of Lieutenant General Arthur MacArthur Jr., led a long but successful fight on behalf of MacArthur's widow, Mrs. Mary Pinkney "Pinky" Hardy MacArthur. For some reason, Mrs. MacArthur was granted a pension of merely $1,200/per year after MacArthur died on September 5, 1912, whereas the widows of all other lieutenant generals were receiving $2,500/per year. Flanders was able to win the legal battle and have the pension for Mrs. MacArthur raised to $2,500/per year.
