= Christopher Raesser =

American politician

Christopher S. Raesser (February 20, 1842 or 1843 – 1927) was a commission merchant and a Republican member of the Wisconsin State Assembly from Milwaukee.

Straesser was born in Rochester, New York, but came to Wisconsin in 1846. He received a business education, graduating from a commercial college, and worked as a wood and bark salesman. He served with the 3rd Wisconsin Volunteer Cavalry Regiment from 1862 to 1866, mostly as a clerk in the District of the Frontier, Department of the Missouri, where he participated in Indian fighting in western Kansas.

== Elected office ==
In the 1878 Assembly election for the sixth district of Milwaukee County (the sixth and thirteenth wards of the City of Milwaukee), Raesser defeated incumbent Assemblyman Henry Smith, who received only 253 votes as the Greenback Party nominee, to 488 for Democrat Alonzo H. Richards and 716 for Raesser. He was elected again in 1879.

In 1888 he was elected again to the Assembly, receiving 2385 votes to 1398 for Democrat Jacob Truss, 808 for E. J. Mansar (Union Labor) and 103 for Socialist Will Koenig. By the time of his return to the Assembly, he described himself as a "merchant and vessel owner." Incumbent Joseph Meyers of the Populists was not on the ballot. Raesser was succeeded by fellow Republican William Pierron.
