= James Stephen White =

19th century American politician

James S. White

Member of the Wisconsin State Assembly from the Milwaukee 1st district
- In office January 2, 1871 – January 1, 1872
- Preceded by: Stephen A. Harrison
- Succeeded by: John W. Cary

Personal details
- Born: December 6, 1838 Detroit, Michigan, U.S.
- Died: August 8, 1908 (aged 69) Holtville, California, U.S.
- Resting place: Holy Cross Cemetery, Colma, California
- Party: Democratic
- Spouses: Teresa McDevitt (m. 1861; died 1867); Margaret Theresa Mullen (m. 1868–1908)
- Children: with Teresa McDevitt; John M. White^{(died 1888)}; with Margaret Mullen; James S. White Jr.^{(b. 1874)}; Josephine White^{(b. 1877; died 1958)}; Laura Janet (Pabst)^{(b. 1880; died 1949)}; Angela M. White^{(b. 1884; died 1968)}; Marion I. White; Edgar J. White; Margaret J. White

Military service
- Allegiance: United States
- Branch/service: United States Volunteers; Union Army
- Years of service: 1861–1862
- Rank: 2nd Lieutenant, USV
- Unit: 1st Reg. Wis. Vol. Infantry
- Battles/wars: American Civil War

James Stephen White (December 6, 1838 – August 8, 1908) was an American businessman, Democratic politician, and Wisconsin pioneer. He represented Milwaukee in the Wisconsin State Assembly during the 1871 session, and was later imprisoned for embezzlement arising from his eight years working as city comptroller.

== Biography ==
James S. White was born at Detroit, Michigan, in December 1838. As a child, he moved with his parents to Milwaukee, Wisconsin Territory, in 1843. He received a common school education in Milwaukee and attended a partial collegiate course at Sinsinawa Mound College. He then returned to Milwaukee and received a mercantile education at Larigo's Mercantile Academy.

At the outbreak of the American Civil War, he volunteered for service and was enrolled in Company B of the 1st Wisconsin Infantry Regiment. He was elected 2nd lieutenant of the company and served a year with the regiment before resigning due to poor health in August 1862.

On his return from the war, he was appointed deputy treasurer of the city of Milwaukee, serving from 1863 to 1868, and was then appointed a member of the city board of health. Although White was always a staunch Democrat, in 1870 he ran as an Independent Democrat for the Wisconsin State Assembly against two-term former representative Patrick Drew. White defeated Drew, but remained in the Democratic caucus in the 1871 session. He did not run for re-election in 1871.

In 1872, he was elected city comptroller and was subsequently re-elected in 1873, 1874, 1876, and 1878. In 1879, he purchased the Milwaukee Daily News and operated the paper for a year before selling it to a group of Republican businessmen. He retired from politics and went into business in Chicago with a speculator firm McGeoch & Everingham.

White's brief career with McGeoch & Everingham would ultimately ruin his reputation and send him to prison. When he left office in 1880, he kept a number of un-issued city bonds, worth about $8,000 (about $220,000 adjusted for inflation to 2021). His firm in Chicago ran into financial trouble in 1883, and White offered up the un-issued bonds as collateral to keep the business afloat. The company eventually failed anyway, at which time the bank attempted to collect on the bonds. White was arrested and convicted of embezzlement, but before he could be sentenced, his lawyer made several technical challenges about the status of the bonds. These technical issues were ultimately resolved by the Wisconsin Supreme Court in the case State v. White. With the Supreme Court ruling against him, White's case proceeded in the circuit court and he was sentenced to 30 months in state prison by Judge A. Scott Sloan. He ultimately served 24 months before being pardoned by Governor Jeremiah McLain Rusk.

Despite his financial crime, he was hired as bookkeeper for the Milwaukee County sheriff in 1890, and retained by the sheriff's successors in 1892 and 1894.

Sometime after 1895, White moved to California, where he died in August 1908.

== Electoral history ==
=== Wisconsin Assembly (1870) ===
Wisconsin Assembly, Milwaukee 1st District Election, 1870
Party	Candidate	Votes	%	±%
General Election, November 8, 1870
Independent Democrat	James S. White	603	57.93%	
Democratic	Patrick Drew	438	42.07%	−4.90%
Plurality		165	15.85%	+9.81%
Total votes		1,041	100.0%	+39.73%
Democratic gain from Republican				

Wisconsin State Assembly
Preceded by Stephen A. Harrison	Member of the Wisconsin State Assembly from the Milwaukee 1st district January 2, 1871 – January 1, 1872	Succeeded by John W. Cary
