= William Henry Draper (American politician) =

American politician (1841-1921)

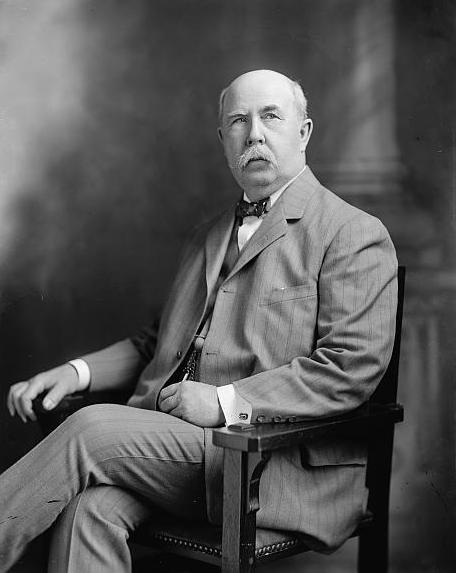

Member of the U.S. House of Representatives from New York
- In office March 4, 1901 – March 3, 1913
- Preceded by: Aaron Van Schaick Cochrane
- Succeeded by: Henry Bruckner
- Constituency: 19th district (1901–03); 22nd district (1903–13)

Personal details
- Born: June 24, 1841 Rochdale, Massachusetts, U.S.
- Died: December 7, 1921 (aged 80) Troy, New York, U.S.
- Party: Republican

William Henry Draper (June 24, 1841 – December 7, 1921) was a Republican member of the United States House of Representatives from New York.

== Early life ==
Born in Rochdale, Massachusetts in 1841, Draper moved with his family to Troy, New York in 1847. He was the president of W.H. Draper & Sons which manufactured cord and twine.

== Political career ==
Draper was elected as a Republican to the Fifty-seventh Congress as the representative of New York's 19th congressional district serving from March 4, 1901, to March 3, 1903. For the Fifty-eighth Congress he redistricted and was elected as the representative of New York's 22nd congressional district; he was reelected to the succeeding four congresses serving from March 4, 1903, to March 3, 1913. He chose not to run for reelection to the Sixty-third Congress, and was succeeded by Henry Bruckner.

== Later life ==
He died in Troy, New York on December 7, 1921. He was interred in Oakwood Cemetery.

U.S. House of Representatives
Preceded by Aaron Van Schaick Cochrane	Member of the U.S. House of Representatives from New York's 19th congressional district March 4, 1901 – March 3, 1903	Succeeded by Norton P. Otis
Preceded by Lucius N. Littauer	Member of the U.S. House of Representatives from New York's 22nd congressional district March 4, 1903 – March 3, 1913	Succeeded by Henry Bruckner
