= John W. Cary =

American lawyer and politician

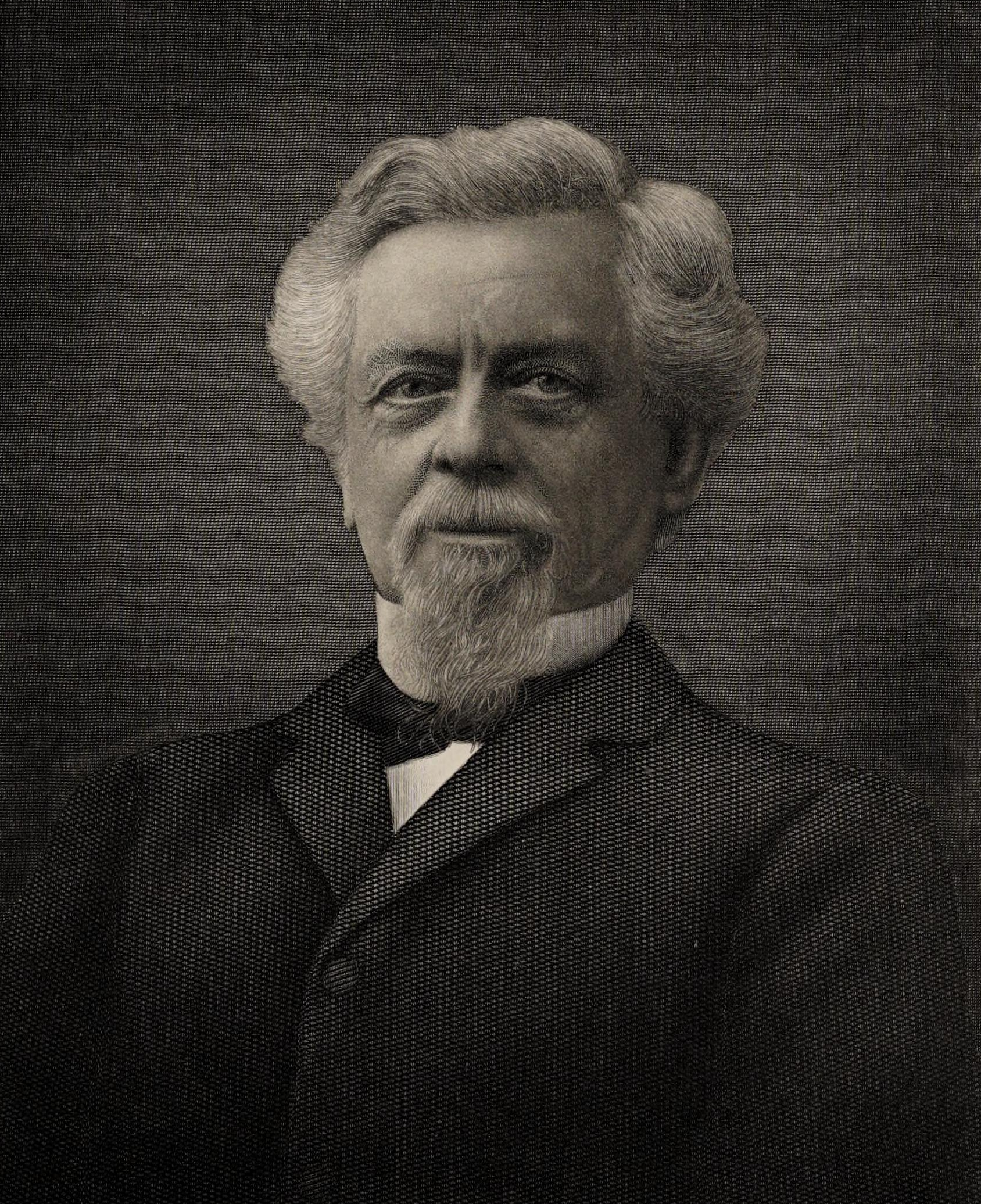

Member of the Wisconsin Senate from the 7th district
- In office January 3, 1853 – January 1, 1855
- Preceded by: Samuel G. Bugh
- Succeeded by: Charles Clement

9th Mayor of Racine, Wisconsin
- In office April 1857 – April 1858
- Preceded by: Jerome Case
- Succeeded by: Jerome Case

Member of the Wisconsin State Assembly from the Milwaukee 1st district
- In office January 1, 1872 – January 6, 1873
- Preceded by: James S. White
- Succeeded by: Isaac W. Van Schaick

Member of the Milwaukee City Council
- In office April 1868 – April 1869

Personal details
- Born: John Watson Cary; February 11, 1817 Shoreham, Vermont
- Died: March 29, 1895 (aged 78) Chicago, Illinois
- Resting place: Forest Home Cemetery; Milwaukee, Wisconsin
- Party: Democratic
- Spouses: Eliza Vilas; (m. 1844; died 1845); Isabel Brinkerhoff; (m. 1847; died 1906)
- Children: with Eliza Vilas; Eliza Vilas (Sanburn)^{(b. 1845)}; with Isabel Brinkerhoff; Frances (Kendrick)^{(b. 1848)}; Melbert B. Cary^{(b. 1853; died 1946)}; Fred Asa Cary^{(b. 1857)}; John Watson Cary^{(b. 1862)}; George Peter Cary^{(b. 1864)}; Paul Van Ettan Cary^{(b. 1867)}; Isabel Brinkerhoff Cary^{(b. 1869)}
- Parents: Asa Cary (father); Anna (Sanford) Cary (mother)
- Relatives: Alfred L. Cary (nephew)
- Education: Union College

John Watson Cary (February 11, 1817 – March 29, 1895) was an American lawyer and politician. He served as the 9th Mayor of Racine, Wisconsin, and was a member of the Wisconsin State Senate and the Wisconsin State Assembly.

== Biography ==
John Watson Cary was born in Shoreham, Vermont, the eighth of nine children born to Asa and Anna (Sanford) Cary. His family moved to western New York around 1831. He graduated from Union College and was admitted to the bar in 1844. He moved to Racine, Wisconsin, in 1850 and to Milwaukee in 1859.

Cary died in Chicago's Victoria Hotel in 1895.

== Career ==
Cary was a member of the Senate from 1853 to 1854 and was Mayor of Racine in 1857. He was a member of the Milwaukee City Council in 1868 and was elected to represent Milwaukee's first ward in the State Assembly in 1872. Cary was a Democrat.

Cary was most well known for his legal career. He was the chief legal counsel to the Chicago, Milwaukee, and St. Paul Railroad for 36 years, from 1859 until his death. He was seen as an extremely accomplished lawyer, having successfully argued many cases before the Supreme Court of the United States.

== Personal life and family ==
Cary married his first wife, Eliza Vilas, on July 10, 1844. Eliza died due to complications from the birth of their daughter in 1845.

On June 6, 1847, Cary married his second wife, Isabel Brinkerhoff. They had seven children together.

Cary's lineage can be traced back to the 12th century Lord Adam De Kari in Somersetshire, England. The 14th century MP John Cary of Devon was also an ancestor. His first American ancestor was also named John Cary and arrived in the Massachusetts Bay Colony in 1634.

Wisconsin State Assembly
Preceded by James S. White	Member of the Wisconsin State Assembly from the Milwaukee 1st district January 1, 1872 – January 6, 1873	Succeeded by Isaac W. Van Schaick
Wisconsin Senate
Preceded by Samuel G. Bugh	Member of the Wisconsin Senate from the 7th district 1853 – 1855	Succeeded by Charles Clement
Political offices
Preceded by Jerome Case	Mayor of Racine, Wisconsin; 1857 – 1858	Succeeded by Jerome Case
