= A. Warren Phelps =

American politician

A. Warren Phelps (August 11, 1829 – October 19, 1885) was an American businessman from Milwaukee, Wisconsin, who served one term as a member of the Wisconsin State Assembly from Milwaukee, as well as serving on Milwaukee's Common Council and Board of School Directors.

== Background ==
He was born August 11, 1829, in Fort Covington, New York, son of Daniel and Levica Phelps. The Phelps family moved in 1838 to Wisconsin, settling for about a year in Johnstown before removing to Milwaukee. Warren Phelps studied mostly under private tutors, and finished his schooling at Dr. Buck's private academy. After finishing school, he worked for his father, a tanner, and then for two years as a travelling salesman for a patent medicine company.

Disliking the sales business, he began to work as a bookkeeper for various local businesses, eventually becoming a partner in the lumber business of Benjamin Bagnall in 1857. He remained in this business until 1870, when he went into the coal business instead, at first in partnership with S. L. Elmore as "Elmore and Phelps" and then from 1875 on his own.

== Public office ==
Phelps served on the Milwaukee Common Council in 1871–1872, and was elected in 1873 to represent the 4th Milwaukee County Assembly district (the Fourth Ward of the City of Milwaukee) as a candidate of the Liberal Reform Party, a short-lived coalition of Democrats, reform and Liberal Republicans, and Grangers formed in 1873 in the U.S. state of Wisconsin, which secured the election for two years of William Robert Taylor as Governor of Wisconsin, as well as electing a number of state legislators. Phelps polled 706 votes to 602 for Republican L. A. Proctor; Democratic incumbent Gottlob E. Weiss, who had won the seat the year before by one vote, was not a candidate for re-election. He was assigned to, and chaired, the standing committee on internal improvements.

He sought re-election in 1874 as a Democrat, but came in third, behind Republican Stephen A. Harrison and independent Julius Wechselberg.

In 1882, he was appointed to the Board of School Directors from the 4th Ward.

At the time of his death, he was an active Democrat, and had been slated to be appointed Postmaster of Milwaukee, a hope later dashed.

== Personal life and death ==
In 1855, Phelps married Delight Bartlett, with whom he had four children (two still living as of 1877), who died while the children were still young. In 1869 he married Carrie Sumner of Southbridge, Massachusetts.

In October 1885, Phelps died from injuries sustained in a runaway horse accident. The day before Phelps' funeral, Milwaukee Police Chief Ries issued an order to arrest the owners of all horses left unhitched. On December 24 of that same year, Carrie Phelps and their son A. W. Phelps Jr. were injured in another runaway horse incident, when a horse hitched to the same buggy which Warren Sr. had been driving at the time of his fatal accident panicked and careened down Grand Avenue, eventually overturning the buggy and throwing both of them from the carriage.
