= Alfred L. Cary =

American lawyer and politician (1835–1914)

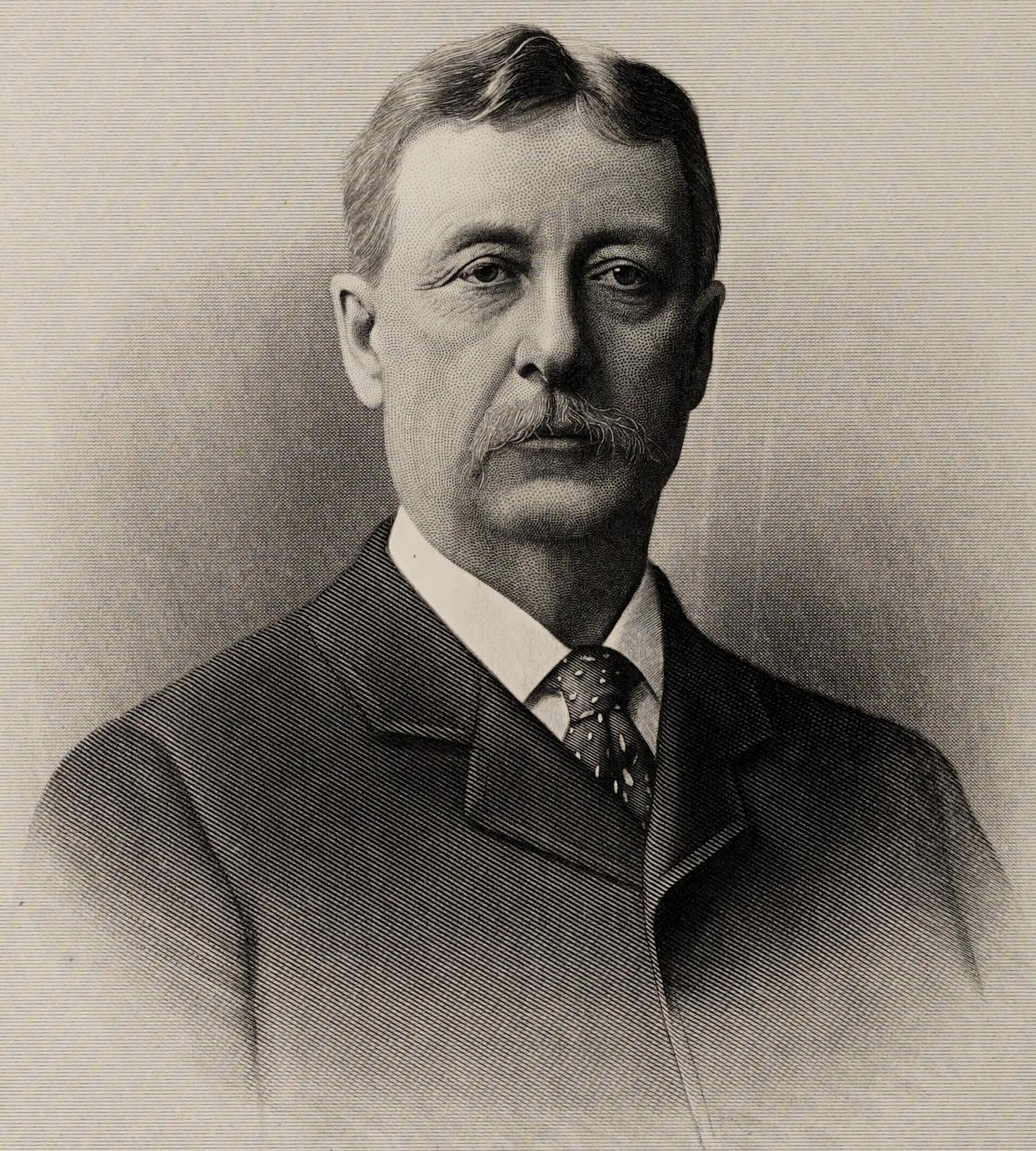

Member of the Wisconsin State Assembly from the Milwaukee 1st district
- In office January 1, 1874 – January 1, 1875
- Preceded by: Isaac W. Van Schaick
- Succeeded by: Isaac W. Van Schaick

Member of the Milwaukee City Council
- In office April 1872 – April 1874

Personal details
- Born: July 23, 1835 Sterling, New York, US
- Died: 1914 (aged 78–79)
- Resting place: Forest Home Cemetery; Milwaukee, Wisconsin
- Party: Democratic
- Spouses: Harriet M. Van Slyck; (m. 1864)
- Children: 4
- Relatives: John W. Cary (uncle)
- Profession: lawyer

Alfred Levi Cary (July 23, 1835 – 1914) was an American lawyer and prominent corporate counsel in 19th century Wisconsin. He also served one year in the Wisconsin State Assembly.

== Early life and education ==
Cary was born on July 23, 1835, in Sterling, New York. He moved to Racine, Wisconsin, in his youth and was educated at Racine High School. He was drawn to Racine to study under John G. McMynn who was considered one of the best educators in the western states. He returned east after his primary education and became a teacher, while continuing his education at Falley Seminary in Fulton, Oswego County, New York. In 1858, however, he returned to Racine and began studying law and working as a clerk in the office of his uncle, John W. Cary, who was already a prominent corporate attorney. He followed his uncle to Milwaukee in 1859, and in 1861 was admitted to the bar.

== Career ==
In 1865, he and his uncle formed a law partnership known as J. W. & A. L. Cary. They added Jedd P. C. Cottrill to the firm in 1870, and, when John Cary became general solicitor for the Chicago, Milwaukee, and St. Paul Railroad in 1874, Alfred carried on the partnership with Cottrill.

Cary was a member of the Wisconsin State Assembly in 1874, during the height of the Reform Party. The Reform Party was a short-lived coalition of Democrats, liberal Republicans, and Grangers. Their signature issue was a railroad regulation bill. Cary was a Democrat but was a vehement opponent of the Reform agenda.

In the 1880s, Cary became general solicitor for the Milwaukee, Lake Shore, and Western Railway Company, where he distinguished himself for the next eleven years. In 1893, the company was absorbed by the Chicago and North Western Railway Company and Cary returned to private law practice.

== Family ==
Cary married Harriet M. Van Slyck on September 6, 1864. They had at least four children. He died in 1914.

Cary's lineage can be traced back to the 12th century Lord Adam De Kari in Somersetshire, England. The 14th-century MP John Cary of Devon was also an ancestor. His first American ancestor was also named John Cary and arrived in the Massachusetts Bay Colony in 1634.
