= Henry Smith (Wisconsin politician) =

19th century American politician (1838–1916)

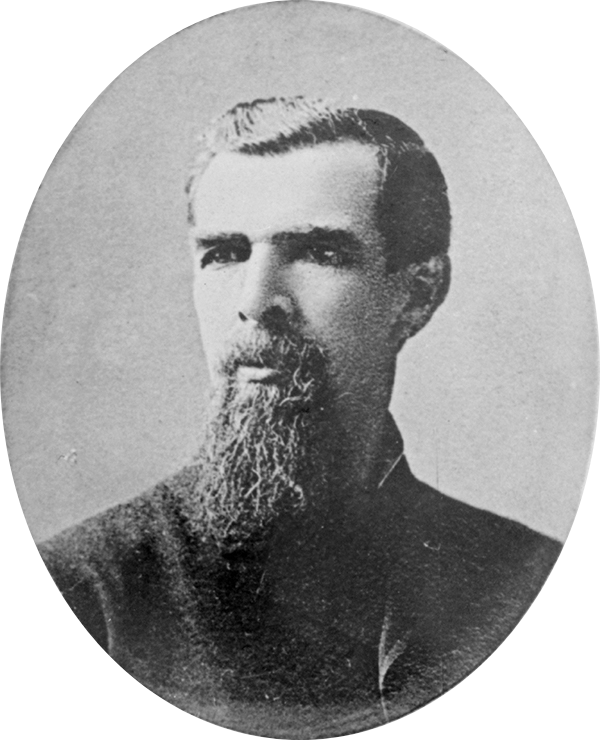
- Smith c. 1887–1889

Member of the U.S. House of Representatives from Wisconsin's 4th district
- In office March 4, 1887 – March 3, 1889
- Preceded by: Isaac W. Van Schaick
- Succeeded by: Isaac W. Van Schaick

Member of the Wisconsin State Assembly from the Milwaukee 6th district
- In office January 7, 1878 – January 6, 1879
- Preceded by: Florian J. Ries
- Succeeded by: Christopher Raesser

Milwaukee City Comptroller
- In office April 1882 – April 1884

Member of the Milwaukee Common Council
- In office: April 1914 – September 16, 1916; April 1898 – April 1912; April 1884 – March 1887; April 1880 – April 1882; April 1868 – April 1872

Personal details
- Born: July 22, 1838 Baltimore, Maryland, U.S.
- Died: September 16, 1916 (aged 78) Milwaukee, Wisconsin, U.S.
- Resting place: Union Cemetery, Milwaukee
- Party: Democratic; Greenback; Socialist; Union Labor; Populist
- Spouse: Mary Eimermann (m. 1875–1916)
- Occupation: Millwright, architect, builder, politician

Henry Smith (July 22, 1838 – September 16, 1916) was an American millwright, architect, builder, and politician from Milwaukee, Wisconsin. He served one term in the U.S. House of Representatives, representing Wisconsin's 4th congressional district as a member of the Union Labor Party during the 50th United States Congress (1887–1889). He previously served in the Wisconsin State Assembly as a socialist, during the 1878 term, and served two years as Milwaukee city comptroller, elected on the Democratic Party ticket. He also served 25 years as a member of the Milwaukee Common Council, scattered between 1868 and 1916. In addition to his elections on the Union Labor, Socialist, and Democratic tickets, at various other times in his career he ran for office on the Greenback and Populist tickets.

== Early life and career ==
Smith was born in Baltimore, Maryland, on July 22, 1838. He moved with his parents to Massillon, Ohio, and then in 1844 to Milwaukee in the Wisconsin Territory. He attended the Milwaukee public schools, and from the ages of 13 to 17 apprenticed as a bookbinder. His brother taught him the millwrighting trade in which he worked until he entered politics.

== Early political career ==
Smith was first elected to public office in 1868, serving as a Democratic member of the Milwaukee Common Council from 1868 to 1872. In 1877, he was elected to the 31st session of the State Assembly from Milwaukee County's Sixth District (comprising the sixth and thirteenth wards of Milwaukee) as a Socialist (at that time not a formalized party), with 618 votes to 381 for Democrat Charles Fashel and 381 for Greenback Jacob Olberman. He served only one term, being defeated in the 1878 election, in which he ran on the Greenback ticket, but received only 253 votes, to 488 for Democrat Alonzo H. Richards and 716 for Republican Christopher Raesser. In 1880 he ran for the Assembly from the Fifth Milwaukee County district on the Democratic ticket against incumbent Isaac Van Schaick, receiving 3778 votes to Van Schaick's 5678.

Smith was again elected a member of the Common Council, serving from 1880 to 1882, then as city comptroller from 1882 to 1884, and again to the Common Council from 1884 to 1887.

== Congressional career ==
In 1886, Smith was elected as a Union Labor Party candidate to the Fiftieth Congress (March 4, 1887 – March 3, 1889), with 13,355 votes to 9645 for Republican Thomas H. Brown (Republican incumbent Isaac Van Schaick was not a candidate for re-election), 8233 for Democrat John Black (former mayor of Milwaukee) and 187 for Prohibitionist Z. C. Trask. He was elected as the representative of Wisconsin's 4th congressional district.

In 1888, Republican former incumbent Van Schaick defeated Smith for election to the Fifty-first Congress, receiving 22,212 votes to 20,685 for Smith (running on the Democratic and Labor tickets), 527 for Socialist John Schuler and 302 for Prohibitionist George Heckendorn.

== Later political career and death ==
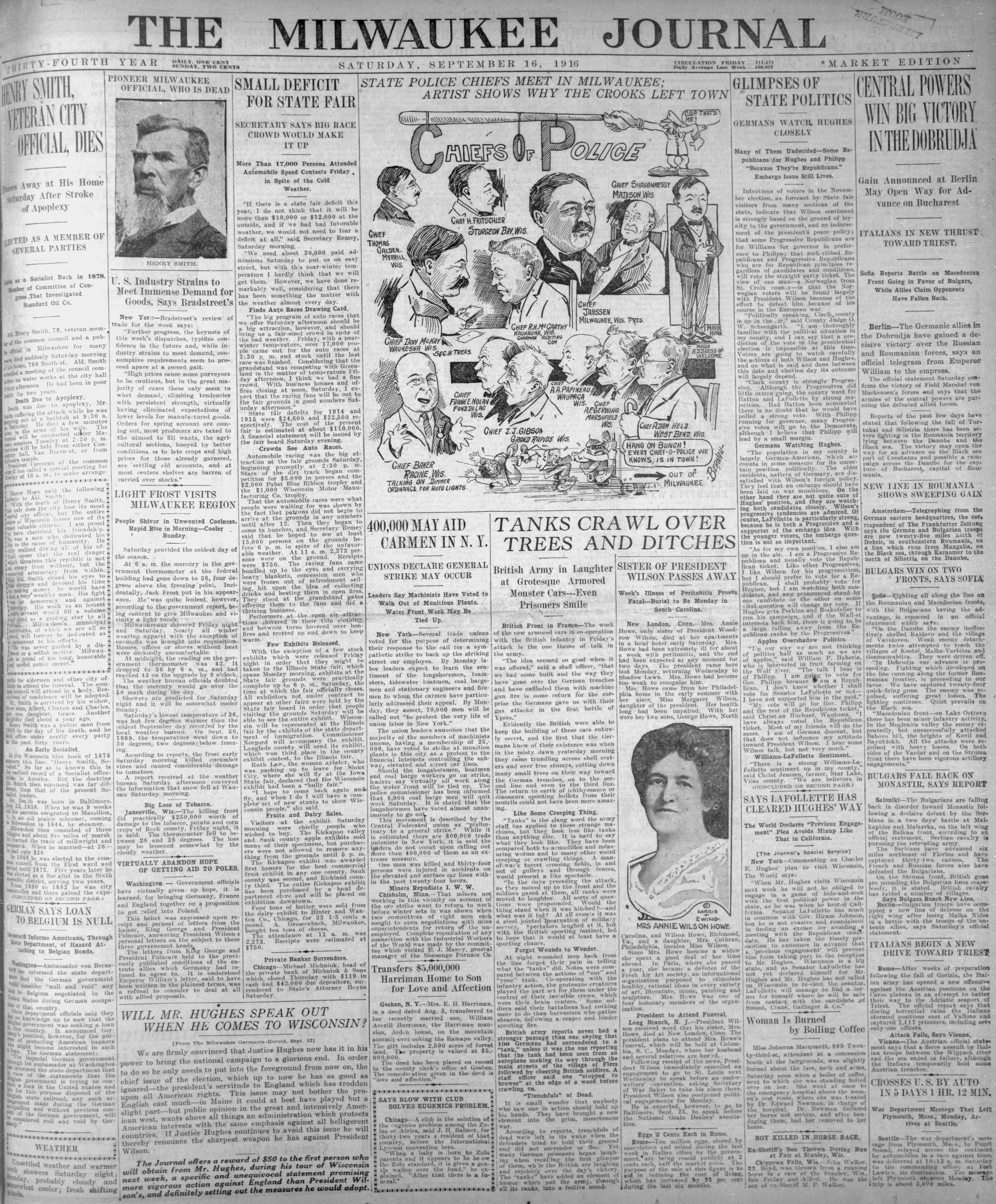
Smith on the front page of The Milwaukee Journal following his death, September 16, 1916

Smith returned to work as an architect and builder, also serving as Wisconsin State Master Workman of the Knights of Labor. He was the Populist candidate for mayor of Milwaukee in 1896, coming in third place with 21% of the vote. He was once again elected a member of the Common Council in 1898 and served until 1912, then again from 1914 until his death in Milwaukee on September 16, 1916. His remains were cremated and the ashes interred in Milwaukee's Union Cemetery. His papers are in the collection of the Wisconsin Historical Society.

== Footnotes ==
U.S. House of Representatives
Preceded by Isaac W. Van Schaick	Member of the U.S. House of Representatives from Wisconsin's 4th congressional district March 4, 1887 - March 3, 1889	Succeeded by Isaac W. Van Schaick
