= Jay Eye See =

Standardbred racehorse

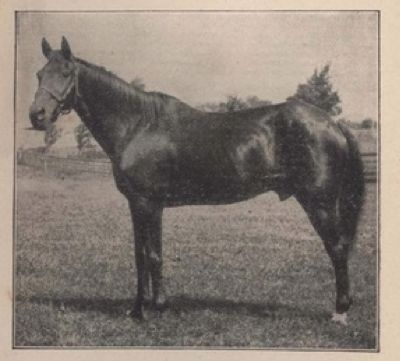
- Jay Eye See
- Sire: Dictator
- Dam: Midnight
- Sex: Gelding
- Foaled: 1878
- Country: Racine, Wisconsin, United States
- Colour: Black
- Owner: 1. Col. Richard West, Lexington, Kentucky. 2. Jerome Case, Racine, Wisconsin.
- Trainer: Edwin D. Blither
- Record: Broke the mile trotting record of 2:10 at Narragansett Park in 1884. Set a pacing record of 2:06.25 in 1892 at Independence, Iowa.

Honours
- Namesake of the Case Jay-Eye-See Brougham automobile. Inducted into the Harness Racing Hall of Fame in 1990 and the Wisconsin Harness Racing Hall of Fame in 1996.

Jay Eye See was a harness racer who is known for breaking the trotting record in 1884, and for breaking the pacing record in 1892. Jay Eye See was owned by manufacturer Jerome Case, whose company named the Case Jay-Eye-See Brougham automobile after him.

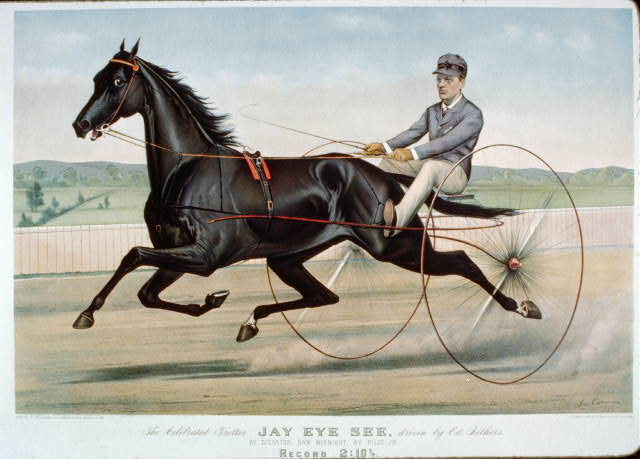
Currier and Ives print of Jay Eye See setting the trotting record in 1884

== Racing career ==
Jay Eye See's name (also spelled "Jay-Eye-See") was a pun on the initials of his owner, threshing machine manufacturer Jerome Case. Harness racing was the sport of choice among the wealthy in the 1880s, and Jay Eye See was Mr. Case's favorite horse.

The black gelding, foaled in 1878, broke the mile trotting record of 2:10 at Narragansett Park in 1884. After winning many other races, the horse was injured and retired in August 1889.

However, Jay-Eye-See was retrained by Edwin D. Blither to race with a new gait, and three years later set a pacing record of 2:06.25 in 1892 at Independence, Iowa. Both records were quickly broken; the trotting mark on the next day, and the pacing mark in a subsequent heat of the same race. However, the feat of two records was unique enough that the horse became a celebrity. Currier and Ives did a series of prints and the horse's image was used to advertise products by the Case company for years. The horse outlived Case and died in 1909 at the age of 31. The horse "known the country over" had its obituary printed in national newspapers such as the New York Times. Jay-Eye-See was inducted into the Harness Racing Hall of Fame in 1990 and the Wisconsin Harness Racing Hall of Fame in 1996.

A planned marble monument to Jay Eye See was never erected, and the horse's grave site neglected for almost a century. After a developer planned to build a parking lot over the suspected grave, local historians located and removed the bones in July 1997. The remains were proposed to be re-interred in the Case family mausoleum at Mound Cemetery. However, by 2003 the bones were still stored in a box at the historian's home waiting for funding for the memorial.
