= Isaac W. Van Schaick =

American politician (1817–1901)

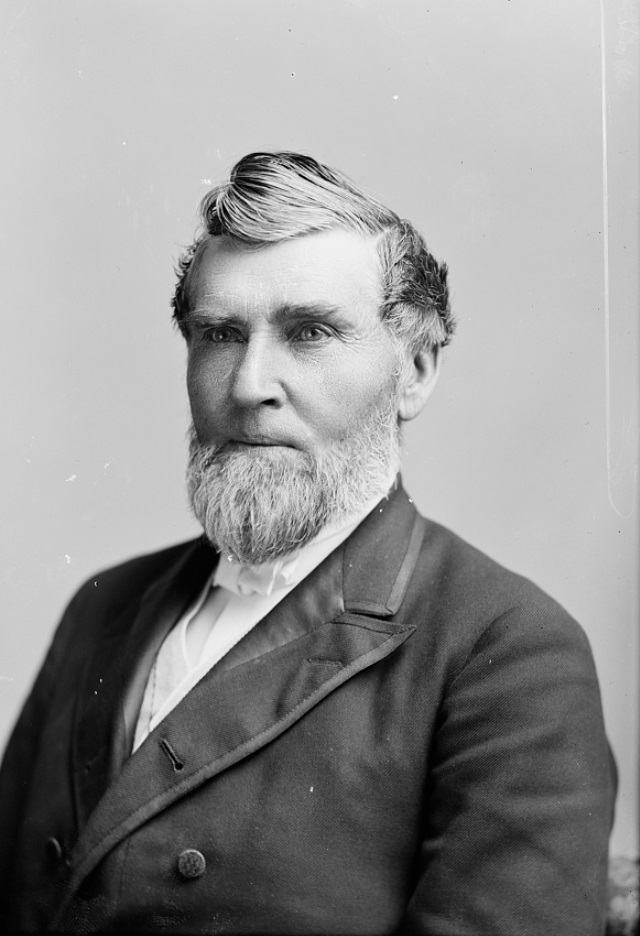
- Photo by C. M. Bell, ca. 1890

Member of the U.S. House of Representatives from Wisconsin's 4th district
- In office March 4, 1889 – March 3, 1891
- Preceded by: Henry Smith
- Succeeded by: John L. Mitchell
- In office March 4, 1885 – March 3, 1887
- Preceded by: Peter V. Deuster
- Succeeded by: Henry Smith

Member of the Wisconsin Senate from the 5th district
- In office January 1, 1877 – January 1, 1883
- Preceded by: Robert Hall Baker
- Succeeded by: Jedd Philo Clark Cottrill

Member of the Wisconsin State Assembly from the Milwaukee 1st district
- In office January 4, 1875 – January 3, 1876
- Preceded by: Alfred L. Cary
- Succeeded by: Patrick Drew
- In office January 6, 1873 – January 5, 1874
- Preceded by: John W. Cary
- Succeeded by: Alfred L. Cary

Personal details
- Born: December 7, 1817 Coxsackie, New York, U.S.
- Died: August 22, 1901 (aged 83) Catonsville, Maryland, U.S.
- Resting place: Athens Rural Cemetery; Athens, New York
- Party: Republican
- Spouse: Eliza Sanderson (m. 1842–1901)
- Children: 1 adopted daughter
- Relatives: Aaron Van Schaick Cochrane (nephew)
- Occupation: Manufacturer

Isaac Whitbeck Van Schaick (December 7, 1817 – August 22, 1901) was an American businessman, Republican politician, and Wisconsin pioneer. He served two terms in the U.S. House of Representatives, representing Milwaukee County, Wisconsin. He also served six years in the Wisconsin Senate and two years in the state Assembly. As a legislator, he was noted for almost never making speeches in the legislative chamber, preferring to operate in individual conversation with his peers.

His nephew, Aaron Van Schaick Cochrane, was also a member of Congress and a judge in New York.

== Early life ==
Van Schaick was born in Coxsackie, New York, on December 7, 1817. He was educated in the common schools there and worked on his father's farm. He engaged in the manufacture of glue in New York. He moved to Chicago in 1857, and to Milwaukee, Wisconsin, in 1861, where he was in the flour-milling business with his wife's family. After the American Civil War, Van Schaick traveled to Arkansas and worked for in the cotton industry. He returned to Milwaukee three years later.

== Politics ==
Van Schaick was elected to the Milwaukee Common Council in 1871. He served as member of the Wisconsin State Assembly in 1873 and 1875. He served in the Wisconsin State Senate from 1877 to 1882.

Van Schaick was elected as a Republican to the Forty-ninth Congress in 1884 as the representative of Wisconsin's 4th congressional district. He declined to be a candidate for renomination in 1886, and was succeeded by Henry Smith of the Union Labor Party.

Van Schaick defeated Smith for election to the 51st United States Congress in 1888, receiving 22,212 votes to 20,685 for Smith (running on the Democratic and Labor tickets), 527 for Socialist John Schuler and 302 for Prohibitionist George Heckendorn. He was not a candidate for renomination to Congress in 1890, and was succeeded by Democrat John Lendrum Mitchell. In 1892 he ran unsuccessfully for State Senator from the 4th district, losing to Democrat James W. Murphy.

== Late life ==
Van Schaick was financially ruined in the Panic of 1893, and never recovered; his health began failing around the same time. He moved briefly to New Orleans, Louisiana, before settling permanently at the home of his adopted daughter in Catonsville, Maryland. Isaac Van Schaick died at Catonsville on August 22, 1901; he was interred in Athens Cemetery, Athens, New York.

== Personal life and family ==
Isaac Van Schaick was the only surviving son of the 12 children born to Aaron Van Schaick and his wife Helena (née Witbeck) of Greene County, New York.

Isaac Van Schaick married Eliza Sanderson in 1842, at Athens, New York. His wife was the eldest sister of his longtime business partner Edward Sanderson. They had no biological children, but adopted his wife's niece, Margaret Pierce, when she was an infant.

== Electoral history ==
=== Wisconsin Assembly (1872, 1874) ===
Wisconsin Assembly, Milwaukee 1st District Election, 1872
Party	Candidate	Votes	%	±%
Republican	Isaac W. Van Schaick	510	85.28%	
Democratic	Jacob Braun	88	14.72%	
Total votes		598	100.0%	
Republican gain from Democratic				

Wisconsin Assembly, Milwaukee 1st District Election, 1874
Party	Candidate	Votes	%	±%
Republican	Isaac W. Van Schaick	752	56.54%	
Democratic	John W. Cary	578	43.46%	
Total votes		1,330	100.0%	
Republican gain from Democratic				

=== Wisconsin Senate (1876, 1878, 1880) ===
Wisconsin Senate, 5th District Election, 1876
Party	Candidate	Votes	%	±%
Republican	Isaac W. Van Schaick	4,563	58.78%	
Democratic	Henry C. Runkle	3,200	41.22%	
Total votes		7,763	100.0%	
Republican hold				

Wisconsin Senate, 5th District Election, 1878
Party	Candidate	Votes	%	±%
Republican	Isaac W. Van Schaick (incumbent)	3,437	53.80%	
Democratic	David G. Hooker	2,639	41.31%	
Greenback	Robert Gunyan	312	4.88%	
Total votes		6,388	100.0%	
Republican hold				

Wisconsin Senate, 5th District Election, 1880
Party	Candidate	Votes	%	±%
Republican	Isaac W. Van Schaick (incumbent)	5,678	60.05%	
Democratic	Henry Smith	3,778	39.95%	
Total votes		9,456	100.0%	
Republican hold				

=== U.S. House of Representatives (1884) ===
Wisconsin's 4th Congressional District Election, 1884
Party	Candidate	Votes	%	±%
Republican	Isaac W. Van Schaick	16,783	49.05%	+7.31%
Democratic	Peter V. Deuster (incumbent)	15,907	46.49%	−2.11%
Greenback	Henry Smith	1,296	3.79%	
Prohibition	C. E. Reed	226	0.66%	
	Harrison C. Hobart (write-in)	1	0.00%	
Plurality		876	2.56%	-4.30%
Total votes		34,213	100.0%	+71.66%
Republican gain from Democratic				

=== U.S. House of Representatives (1888) ===
Wisconsin's 4th Congressional District Election, 1888
Party	Candidate	Votes	%	±%
Republican	Isaac W. Van Schaick	22,212	50.80%	+20.10%
Democratic	Henry Smith (incumbent)	20,685	47.31%	+4.80%
Socialist	John Schuler	527	1.21%	
Prohibition	George M. Heckendorn	302	0.69%	+0.10%
	Write-ins	3	0.00%	
Plurality		1,527	3.49%	-8.32%
Total votes		43,729	100.0%	+39.18%
Republican gain from Labor				

=== Wisconsin Senate (1892) ===
Wisconsin Senate, 4th District Election, 1892
Party	Candidate	Votes	%	±%
Democratic	James W. Murphy	5,214	51.01%	+15.47%
Republican	Isaac W. Van Schaick	4,824	47.19%	−4.32%
Prohibition	William Bendike	98	0.96%	+0.74%
Populist	Meschaff	86	0.84%	
Plurality		390	3.82%	-12.15%
Total votes		10,222	100.0%	+0.06%
Democratic gain from Republican				

Wisconsin State Assembly
Preceded by John W. Cary	Member of the Wisconsin State Assembly from the Milwaukee 1st district January 6, 1873 – January 5, 1874	Succeeded by Alfred L. Cary
Preceded by Alfred L. Cary	Member of the Wisconsin State Assembly from the Milwaukee 1st district January 4, 1875 – January 3, 1876	Succeeded by Patrick Drew
Wisconsin Senate
Preceded by Robert Hall Baker	Member of the Wisconsin Senate from the 5th district January 1, 1877 – January 1, 1883	Succeeded by Jedd P. C. Cottrill
U.S. House of Representatives
Preceded by Peter V. Deuster	Member of the U.S. House of Representatives from Wisconsin's 4th congressional district March 4, 1885 – March 3, 1887	Succeeded by Henry Smith
Preceded by Henry Smith	Member of the U.S. House of Representatives from Wisconsin's 4th congressional district March 4, 1889 – March 3, 1891	Succeeded by John L. Mitchell
