= Jerome Case =

19th century American businessman and politician

J. I. Case
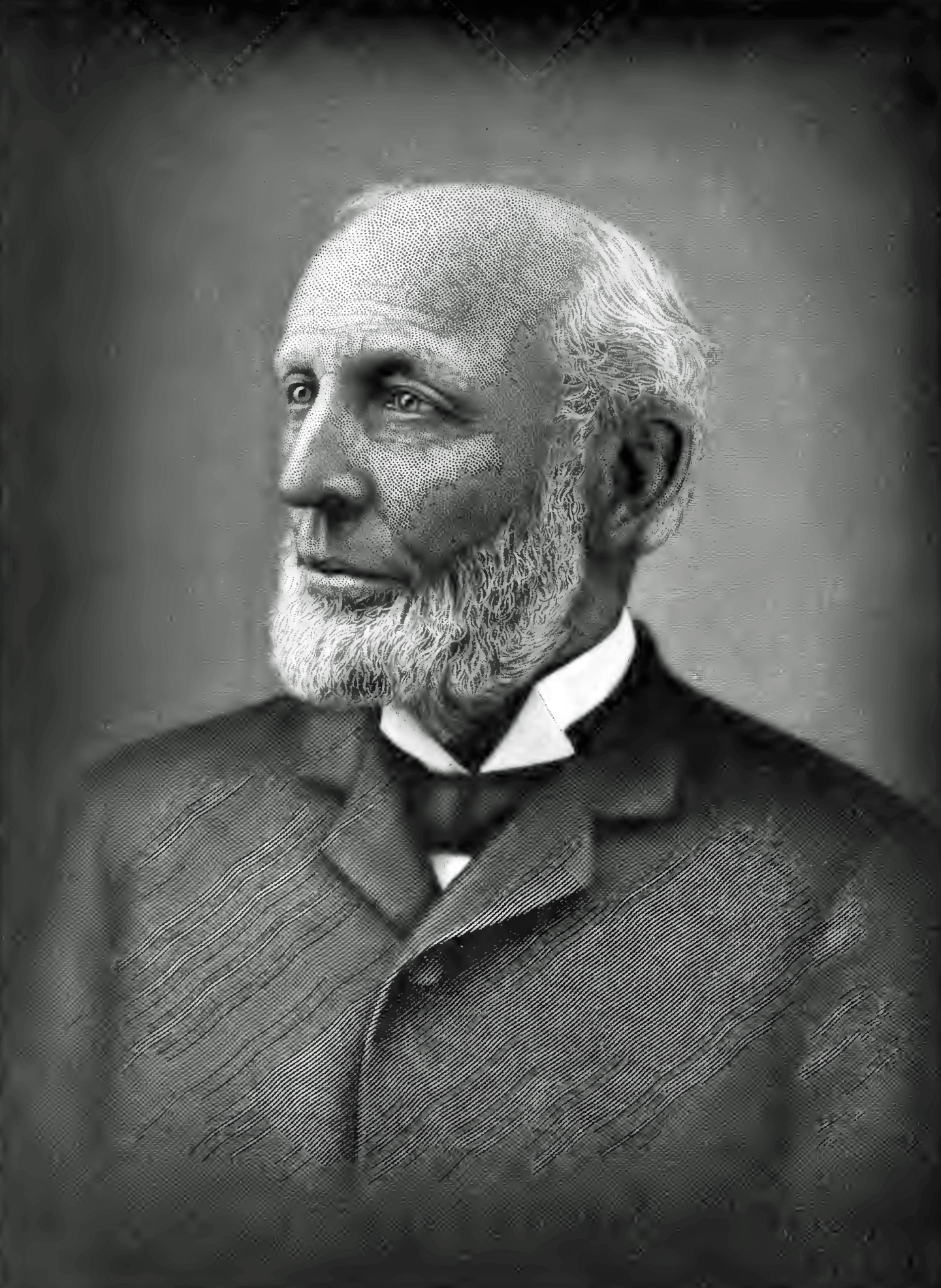

Member of the Wisconsin Senate from the 7th district
- In office January 2, 1865 – January 7, 1867
- Preceded by: Timothy D. Morris
- Succeeded by: Henry Stevens

8th, 10th, & 12th Mayor of Racine, Wisconsin
- In office April 1860 – April 1861
- Preceded by: W. W. Vaughan
- Succeeded by: George C. Northrop
- In office April 1858 – April 1859
- Preceded by: John W. Cary
- Succeeded by: W. W. Vaughan
- In office April 1856 – April 1857
- Preceded by: George Wustum
- Succeeded by: John W. Cary

Personal details
- Born: December 11, 1819 Williamstown, New York, U.S.
- Died: December 22, 1891 (aged 72) Racine, Wisconsin, U.S.
- Resting place: Mound Cemetery, Racine
- Spouse: Lydia Ann Bull (m. 1848)
- Children: Henrietta Case (Fuller)^{(b. 1858)} Jessie Fremont Case (Wallis)^{(b. 1861)} Amanda Case (Crooks)^{(b. 1862)} Jackson Irving Case^{(b. 1865)}
- Known for: Case Corporation

Jerome Increase Case (December 11, 1819 – December 22, 1891) was an early American manufacturer of threshing machines. He founded the J. I. Case Company which has gone through many mergers and name changes to today's Case Corporation. He served three terms as mayor of Racine, Wisconsin, and represented Racine County in the Wisconsin State Senate in 1865 and 1866. He also raised champion race horses.

== Early life ==
Jerome Increase Case was born December 11, 1819, in Williamstown in Oswego County, New York. His father was Caleb Case (1787–1874) and mother Deborah Jackson (1789–1833). He was one of seven children. Through his mother he claimed to be related to Andrew Jackson.

His father sold some primitive "ground hog" machines (imported from England) that helped speed up the separation of grain after it was harvested. In 1840, Jerome started a small business threshing his neighbors' crops with the horse-powered devices. In the summer of 1842, he bought six of the machines on credit and traveled first to Chicago by ship. On his way north to Rochester, Wisconsin he sold five and kept one for his own business. Through the winter he worked on improvements to the thresher, but the new model was not ready for the 1843 harvest. By May 1844 the new model which did a better job of fully separating the grain was working. Since Rochester did not have water power available, he moved to Racine, Wisconsin.

== Racine ==
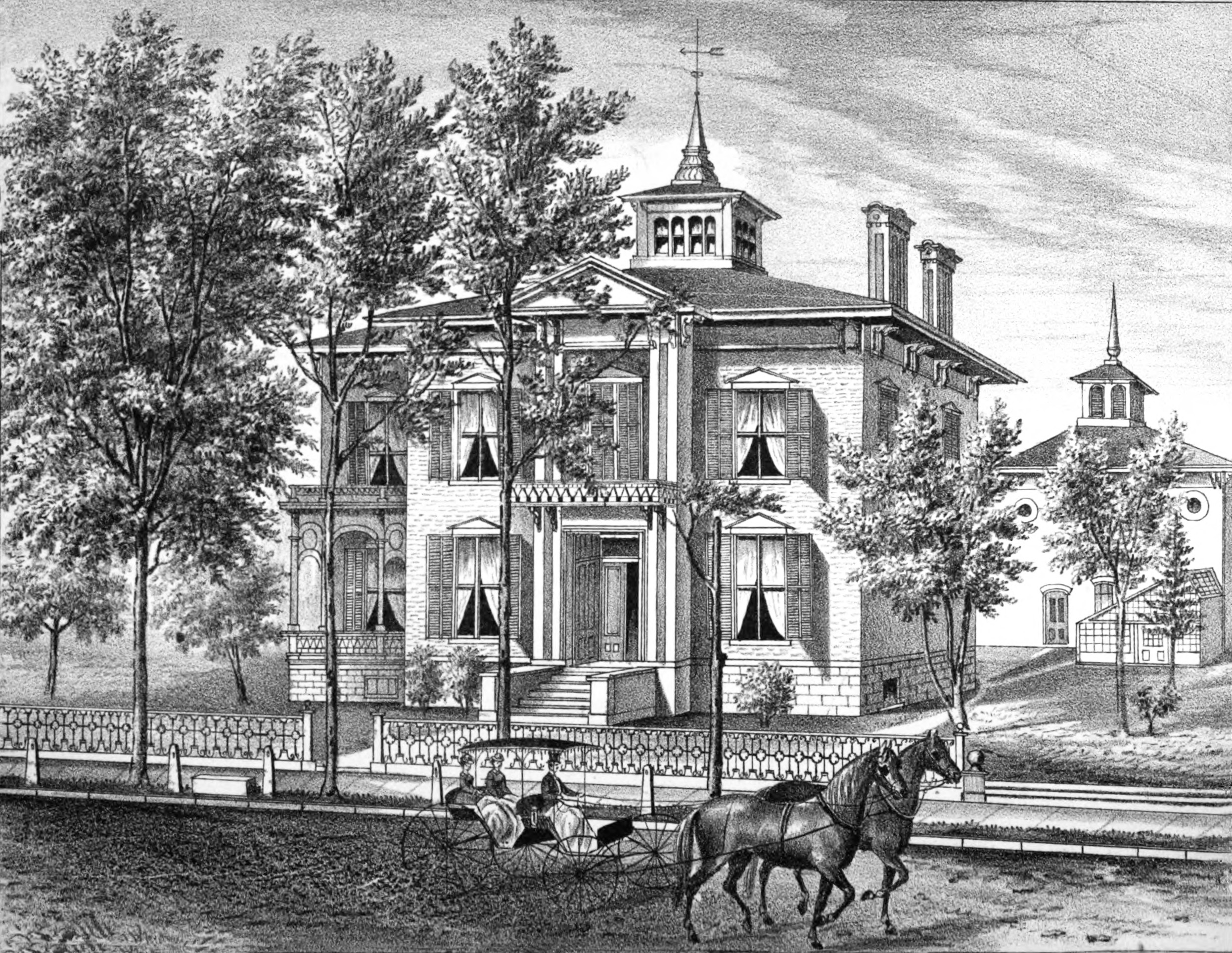
The Case home on Main Street of Racine

He first manufactured the machines in a small shop in Racine, and then built a three-story brick factory in 1847 on the Root River. A new vibrator process introduced in 1852 was so successful he was selling throughout Illinois, Indiana, and Ohio by 1853. By 1855 the plant covered several acres, including a private boat dock on Lake Michigan. In 1856 he was elected mayor of Racine, declined the re-nomination the next year, but was elected again in 1858 and 1860. He often financed the machines with high interest rates. This worked until the panic of 1857 and unreliable state-issued paper money caused many customers to default. Case accepted animals, supplies, and land instead of cash. At the start of the American Civil War, farmers would often walk away from their debts to enlist, sometimes not returning.

The labor shortage combined with increased demand for food (with no imports from the south) resulted in a growing business in the 1860s. Massena B. Erskine, Robert H. Baker, and Stephen Bull (his brother-in-law) became partners when J. I. Case Company was officially organized in 1863. Case was elected to the Wisconsin State Senate in 1865 and served one two-year term. Also in 1865 he happened to meet up with a company of the 8th Wisconsin Volunteer Infantry Regiment returning from the war. He adopted the mascot of the regiment, an eagle named Old Abe, as company symbol.

In 1871 he was a founder of Manufacturers' National Bank of Racine and the First National Bank of Burlington. He was an early investor in the Northwestern Life Insurance Company in Milwaukee, Wisconsin. In 1876 he started another company to make plows, licensing the "center draft" technology from Ebenezer G. Whiting. Initially called Case, Whitney & Company, when he became sole owner in 1878 it became the J. I. Case Plow Company, and J. I. Case Plow Works in 1884. He was a founder of the Wisconsin Academy of Sciences, Arts and Letters, and president of the Racine County Agricultural Society. Some time in the 1870s he had one of the rare two-story houses built on Main Street in Racine.

== Hinsdale ==
By the time that Case bought land in what would be the future Hinsdale, Illinois in 1869, his name was well known throughout the country. In his early days, he traveled throughout Illinois, Indiana, Iowa, and Wisconsin to sell, deliver, service, and collect his machines, which is how he likely became familiar with the area. He became a good friend of William Robbins, the founder of Hinsdale, and hired his son, John S. Robbins, as manager for his plow manufacturing plant in Racine.

On Case's property in Hinsdale, he planned a fine "villa" which never came to be. Along with it, he was going to have horse barns and a racing track. In 1872, the "J. I. Case's Addition to the Town of Hinsdale" was filed and approved in DuPage County. In 1885, Case subdivided his large property in Hinsdale and moved back to Wisconsin.

== Horses ==
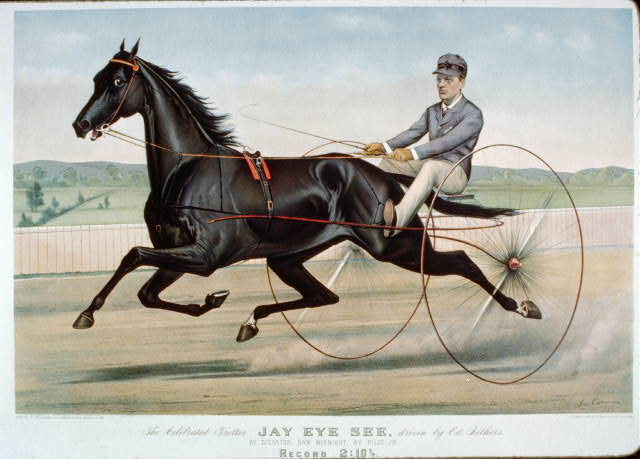
Currier and Ives print of Jay-Eye-See setting the trotting record in 1884

As he turned over the business to other partners, he spent more time on breeding race horses on his Hickory Grove Farm. Harness racing was the sport of choice among the wealthy in the 1880s. One of his favorite horses was named Jay-Eye-See, a pun on Case's initials. The black gelding, foaled in 1878, broke the mile trotting record of 2:10 at Narragansett Park in 1884. After winning many other races, the horse was injured and retired in August 1889. It is believed by some, but has not been proven, that the racehorse was born on a farm near Hinsdale.

However, Jay-Eye-See was retrained by Edwin D. Blither to race with a new gait, and three years later set a pacing record of 2:06.25 in 1892 at Independence, Iowa. Both records were quickly broken; the trotting mark on the next day, and the pacing mark in a subsequent heat of the same race. However, the feat of two records was unique enough that the horse became a celebrity. Currier and Ives did a series of prints and the horse's image was used to advertise products by the Case company for years. The horse outlived Case and died in 1909 at the age of 31. The horse "known the country over" had its obituary printed in national newspapers such as the New York Times. Jay-Eye-See was inducted into the Harness Racing Hall of Fame in 1990 and the Wisconsin Harness Racing Hall of Fame in 1996.

== Death and legacy ==
Case also owned some Great Lakes ships, a winter home in California, a ranch in Texas, and a stock farm in Kentucky. In 1849 he married Lydia Ann Bull, daughter of DeGrove Bull of Yorkville, Wisconsin. He died on December 22, 1891, in Racine, less than a year before the comeback of his favorite horse. His widow, born August 6, 1826, died December 9, 1909. They had four children live to adulthood: one son and three daughters. Henrietta Case was born March 3, 1858, and married Percival Strong Fuller (1858–1896). Jessie Fremont Case was born April 17, 1861, and married Mitchell Wallis. Amanda Case was born October 1, 1862, and married Jonathan James Crooks of San Francisco. Following in the footsteps of her horse-loving father, in 1926 she was instrumental in the survival and then success of the Pendleton Round-Up, the huge and still thriving Pendleton, Oregon rodeo. Jackson Irving Case was born October 23, 1865, married Henrietta May Roy on May 25, 1886, and had four sons. He was elected mayor of Racine when he was only 26, but died January 8, 1903, before he was 38.

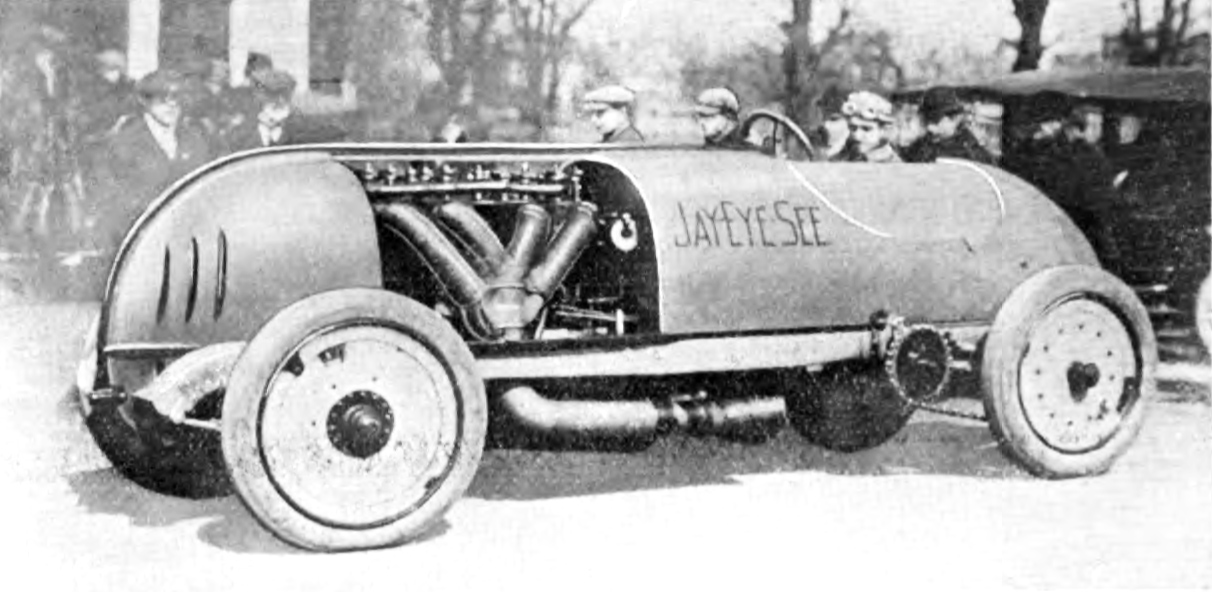
Jay-Eye-See racecar in 1912 with driver Louis Disbrow

Three other children died young. The family continued its interest in racing, but times had changed. The company sponsored a team of racing cars, led by driver Lewis Strang until he died in 1911. Around 1912, they named a car after Jay-Eye-See, driven by Louis Disbrow. One of the largest at the time, it had a 290-horsepower engine, and a streamlined shape that looked like an upside-down canoe.

A popular, easy to read biography of Case in the context of his company and his times is Stewart H. Holbrook, Machines of Plenty, Pioneering in American Agriculture (New York: Macmillan, 1955).

Jerome I. Case High School, located in Mount Pleasant, Wisconsin, is named in his honor. It is in what is now suburban Racine, near the site of his farm. Most of Hickory Grove Farm is now developed, except for a small open space at 42°41′56″N 87°48′02″W named Case-Harmon Field. Jay-Eye-See Avenue at 42°42′18″N 87°48′11″W was named for his horse, a block away from Case Avenue which intersects Jerome Boulevard.

A planned marble monument to Jay Eye See was never erected, and the horse's grave site neglected for almost a century. After a developer planned to build a parking lot over the suspected grave, local historians located and removed the bones in July 1997. The remains were proposed to be re-interred in the Case family mausoleum at Mound Cemetery. However, by 2003 the bones were still stored in a box at the historian's home waiting for funding for the memorial.

The J. I. Case Wetland Wildlife Refuge in Terre Haute, Indiana is also named in his honor.

In 2008, Case was inducted into the Association of Equipment Manufacturers Hall of fame.

Wisconsin Senate
Preceded by Timothy D. Morris	Member of the Wisconsin Senate from the 7th district January 2, 1865 – January 7, 1867	Succeeded by Henry Stevens
Political offices
Preceded by George Wustum	Mayor of Racine, Wisconsin; April 1856 – April 1857	Succeeded by John W. Cary
Preceded by John W. Cary	Mayor of Racine, Wisconsin; April 1858 – April 1859	Succeeded by W. W. Vaughan
Preceded by W. W. Vaughan	Mayor of Racine, Wisconsin; April 1860 – April 1861	Succeeded by George C. Northrop
