= Bernard F. Cooke =

American politician

Bernard F. Cooke was a Democratic member of the Wisconsin State Assembly during the 1876 session. He represented the 4th District of Milwaukee County, Wisconsin. Cooke was born on April 16, 1842, in what is now Milwaukee, Wisconsin.
