= Narragansett Park (1867–1924) =

Racing venue in Cranston, Rhode Island

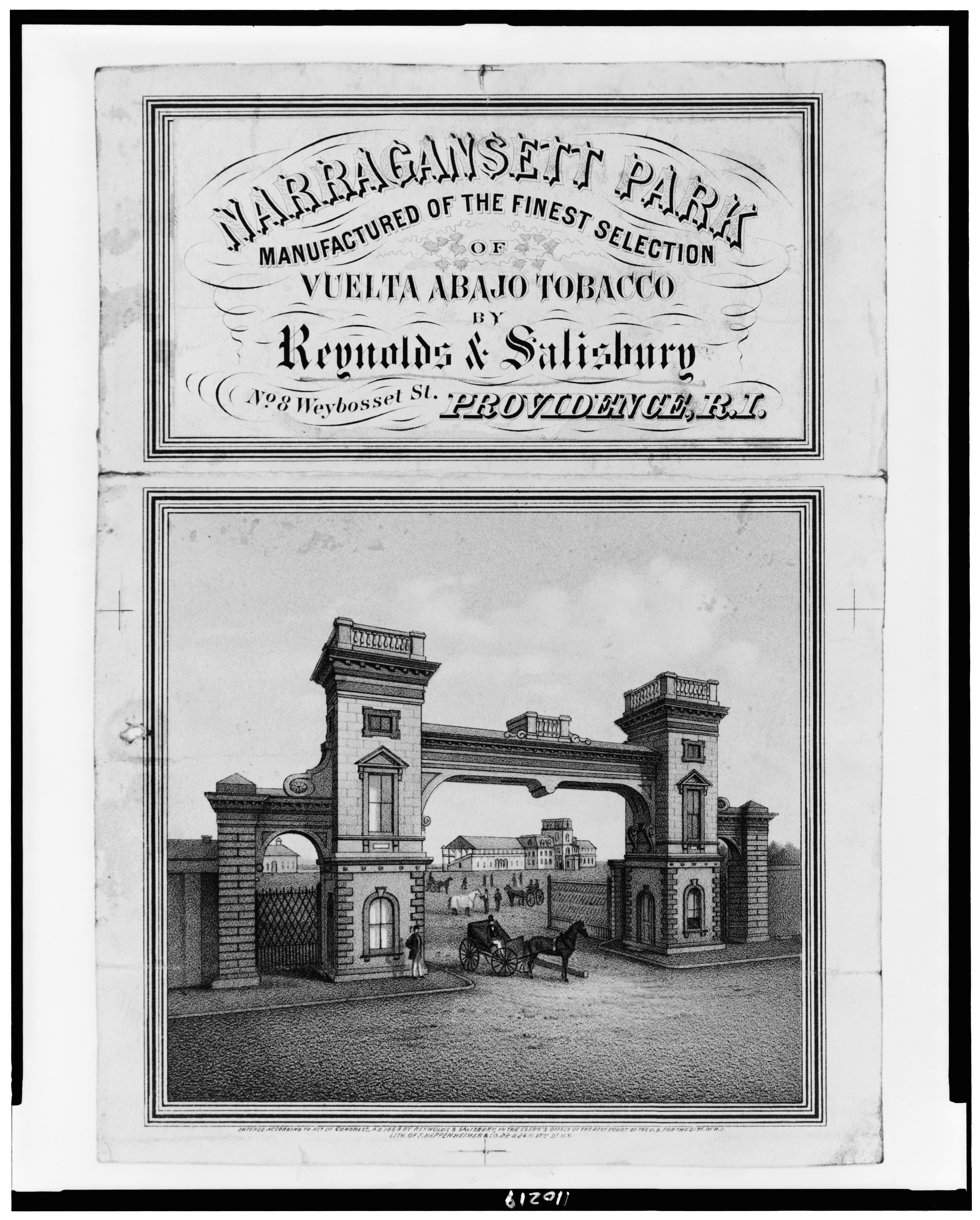
- Location: Cranston, Rhode Island
- Capacity: 5,000 (1867–1914); 10,000 (1914–1924)
- Broke ground: 1867 (harness track); 1914 (speedway)
- Opened: 1867 (harness track); 1915 (speedway)
- Closed: 1924

Oval
- Surface: 1896–1907: Dirt; 1907–1914: Clay; 1915–1924: Asphalt
- Length: 0.99 mi (1.6 km)
- Turns: 4
- Banking: Turns: 27.5° Straights: 10°

Narragansett Park was an American horse and motor racing venue in Cranston, Rhode Island.

== Horse racing ==
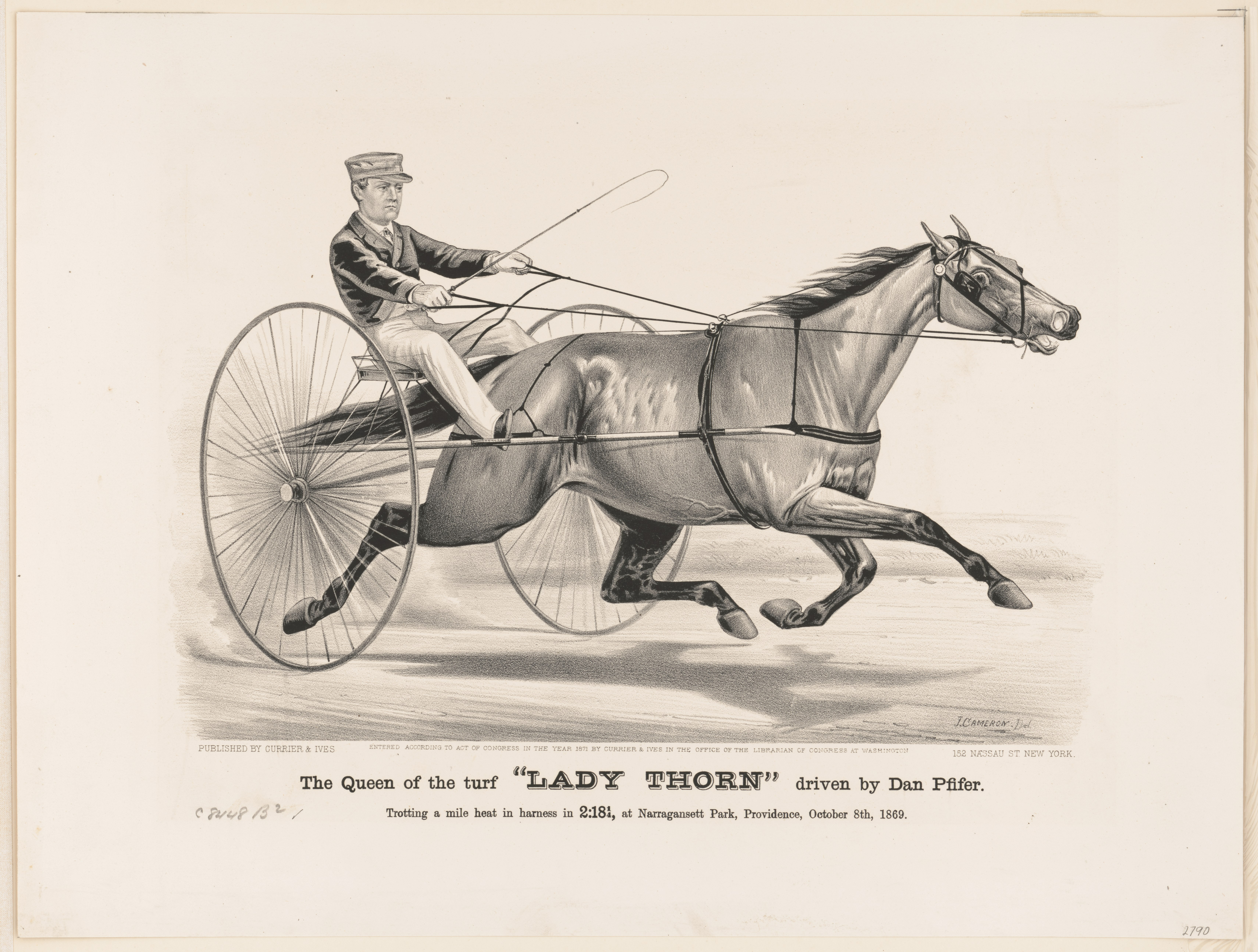
Lady Thorn driven by Dan Pfifer at Narragansett Park on October 8, 1869

Narragansett Park opened on July 31, 1867. The one-mile track was located on a 37-acre parcel of land 3 miles outside of Providence, Rhode Island. The park was constructed by Amasa Sprague, who previously operated Washington Park in Providence and decided to build his own park after falling out with his business partner Edward Babcock over gambling.

The entry to the park featured a 30-foot high archway with two large towers on each side that served as ticket booths. The park's main building was four-stories high and contained a covered entryway where ladies could be picked up or dropped off by carriage. The first floor contained a pool room, a concession area, and a private office. The second story was open to the track and contained a 5,000-seat grandstand as well as two large rooms, one for men and one for women. A large hall was located on the third story and the top floor was home to the president's office. There was also a three-story judge's stand with a weighing room and offices on the first floor and the judge's room on the second floor. The top floor was reserved for the use of female spectators. The property also contained five carriage houses and three stables.

Sprague's financial fortunes deteriorated following the Panic of 1873. He leased the track for races until 1881, when it was purchased at auction for $25,000 by J. B. Barnaby. Barnaby formed the Narragansett Driving Association and sold stock. The association hired Seth Griffith from Fleetwood Park Racetrack to rebuild the track and spent $5,000 on building repairs and plumbing. In 1883, the track joined the Grand Circuit. In 1884, Jay Eye See broke the mile trotting record of 2:10 at Narragansett Park. During the 1880s, Bill Cody and his Wild West Show held multiple exhibitions at the park. However, due to overall poor attendance at the track, the association lost money and was unable to pay interest on the mortgage it took out to fund the previous repairs. In 1884, the track was once again put up for auction. On December 6, 1884, a syndicate led by Henry L. Fairbrother purchased the property for $30,000.

== Fairgrounds ==
The Rhode Island Society for the Encouragement of Domestic Industry began hosting fairs at Narragansett Park in 1867. The society purchased the property in 1886. The Rhode Island State Fair Association, led by Frederick E. Perkins, took over control of the state fair and the property in 1890. Perkins was the first to present vaudeville as an attraction at an agricultural fair and in 1896 organized the first oval track automobile race in the United States. Racing continued at the park during the society's ownership. On June 9, 1894, Monk Saunders, a black groom, was shot and killed by James B. Mathes, a white colleague. Mathes claimed self-defense and was acquitted of murder on October 11, 1894.

The final fair took place in 1898 and Perkins sold the property to a corporation that staged harness races at the park. On August 30, 1901 the great Dan Patch came to the Narragansett Trotting Park as part of the Grand Circuit and won all three heats he was involved with. Wu Ting-fang, the Chinese Ambassador to the United States was among the attendees. Dan Patch returned the following year and came within a quarter second of beating the record for fastest mile set by Star Pointer five years earlier. Due to the harness racing's decline in popularity, the corporation was unable to make its mortgage payments and ownership reverted to Perkins.

== Automobile racing ==
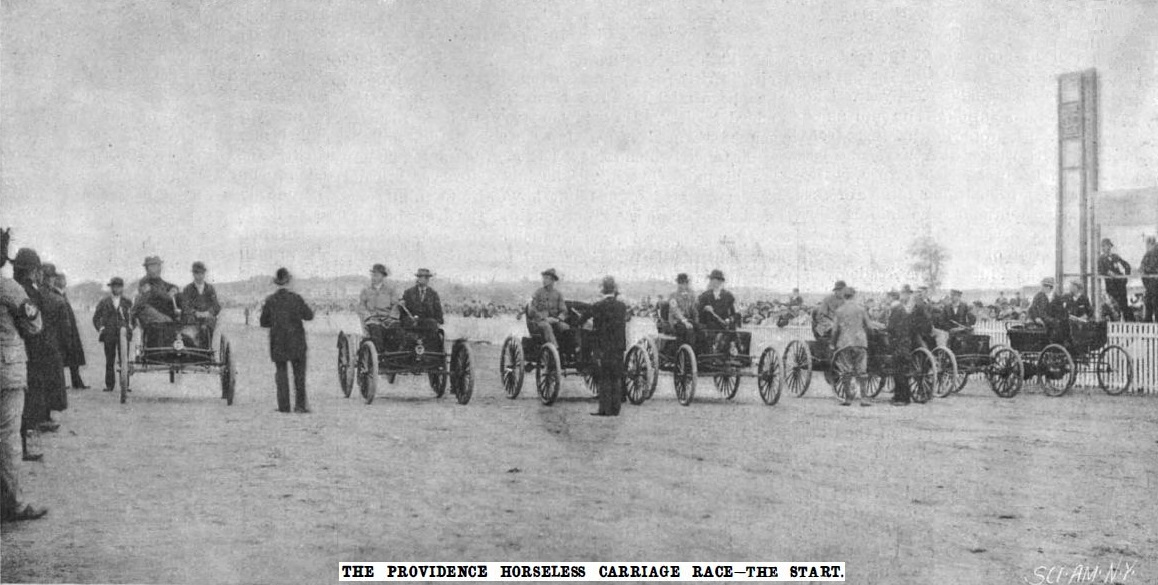
Start of the Providence Horseless Carriage Race, held on September 7, 1896, as part of the Rhode Island State Fair

On September 7, 1896, the first organized oval track race held in the United States took place at Narragansett Park as part of that year's state fair. Four of the seven cars were able to run at the required average speed of 15 mph. The race winner was a Riker from Brooklyn, which completed five laps on the one-mile track in 15 minutes, 1 3/4 seconds. Second was the entry from the Electric Carriage & Wagon Company, and third was a Duryea. In 1907 the track was resurfaced with clay. Automobile races were held sporadically at the park until 1914, when Perkins closed it for renovations.

In 1914, Perkins converted the former harness park into Narragansett Park Speedway. The track was paved with asphalt and graded. The curves were graded at 27.5% and widened from 80 feet to 125 feet. A 9-foot concrete retaining wall was built on the outside of curves to keep cars from running off. A pit lane was constructed on the inside of the track. The grandstand was remodeled and bleachers were constructed to bring the total capacity to 10,000.

The opening meeting was held on September 18, 1915. The feature race was won by Eddie Rickenbacker in a Prest-O-Lite Maxwell. In 1916, the speedway was purchased by Paul Castiglioni, Antonio Capelli, and Fred Suter. Narragansett returned to the AAA Championship Car schedule in 1917. Tommy Milton won the 100-mile and 25-mile races and Ralph Mulford won the five mile race.

The final race occurred on August 5, 1923, and was won by Ira Vail. 12,000 people attended the race but there was a lack of seats due to the grandstand and all of the five bleachers having been deemed unsafe for use. A month earlier, track ownership had come under fire for leasing the property to group of Roma for use as an encampment.

On April 14, 1924, a grass fire caused $20,000 to the track's buildings. The following year Narragansett Park was sold to a developer, who demolished remaining buildings to make way for a residential neighborhood. Some streets in the new neighborhood were named after cars that competed in the park's last races as Fiat Avenue goes down the back straight into the far turn. In 1928, an athletic field was constructed on part of the property. In 1938 the field was turned into Cranston Stadium.

In 1934, a new horse track opened in Pawtucket, Rhode Island using the name Narragansett Park.
