= Patrick Drew =

American politician (1832–1903)

Member of the Wisconsin State Assembly from the Milwaukee 1st district
- In office January 3, 1876 – January 1, 1877
- Preceded by: Isaac W. Van Schaick
- Succeeded by: James Greeley Flanders
- In office January 6, 1868 – January 3, 1870
- Preceded by: George W. Clason
- Succeeded by: Stephen A. Harrison

Personal details
- Born: February 21, 1832 County Limerick, Ireland, UK
- Died: November 1, 1903 (aged 71) Milwaukee, Wisconsin, U.S.
- Resting place: Calvary Cemetery, Milwaukee
- Party: Democratic
- Occupation: Building contractor

Patrick Drew (February 21, 1832 – November 1, 1903) was an Irish American immigrant, construction contractor, and Democratic politician. He served three terms in the Wisconsin State Assembly, representing the city of Milwaukee.

== Biography ==
Drew was born in County Limerick, Ireland, sources have differed on the date. In 1854, he settled in Milwaukee, Wisconsin. He died in 1903 and was buried at Calvary Cemetery.

== Career ==
Drew was a member of the Assembly during the 1868, 1869 and 1876 sessions. Previously, he had been a member of the school board of Milwaukee from 1863 to 1865 and of the board of supervisors of Milwaukee County in 1863. Drew was later Commissioner of Public Works for Milwaukee's east side from 1893 to 1896. He was a Democrat.

Wisconsin State Assembly
| Preceded by George W. Clason | Member of the Wisconsin State Assembly from the Milwaukee 1st district January 6, 1868 – January 3, 1870 | Succeeded by Stephen A. Harrison |
| Preceded by Isaac W. Van Schaick | Member of the Wisconsin State Assembly from the Milwaukee 1st district January 3, 1876 – January 1, 1877 | Succeeded by James Greeley Flanders |
