= List of mayors of Racine, Wisconsin =

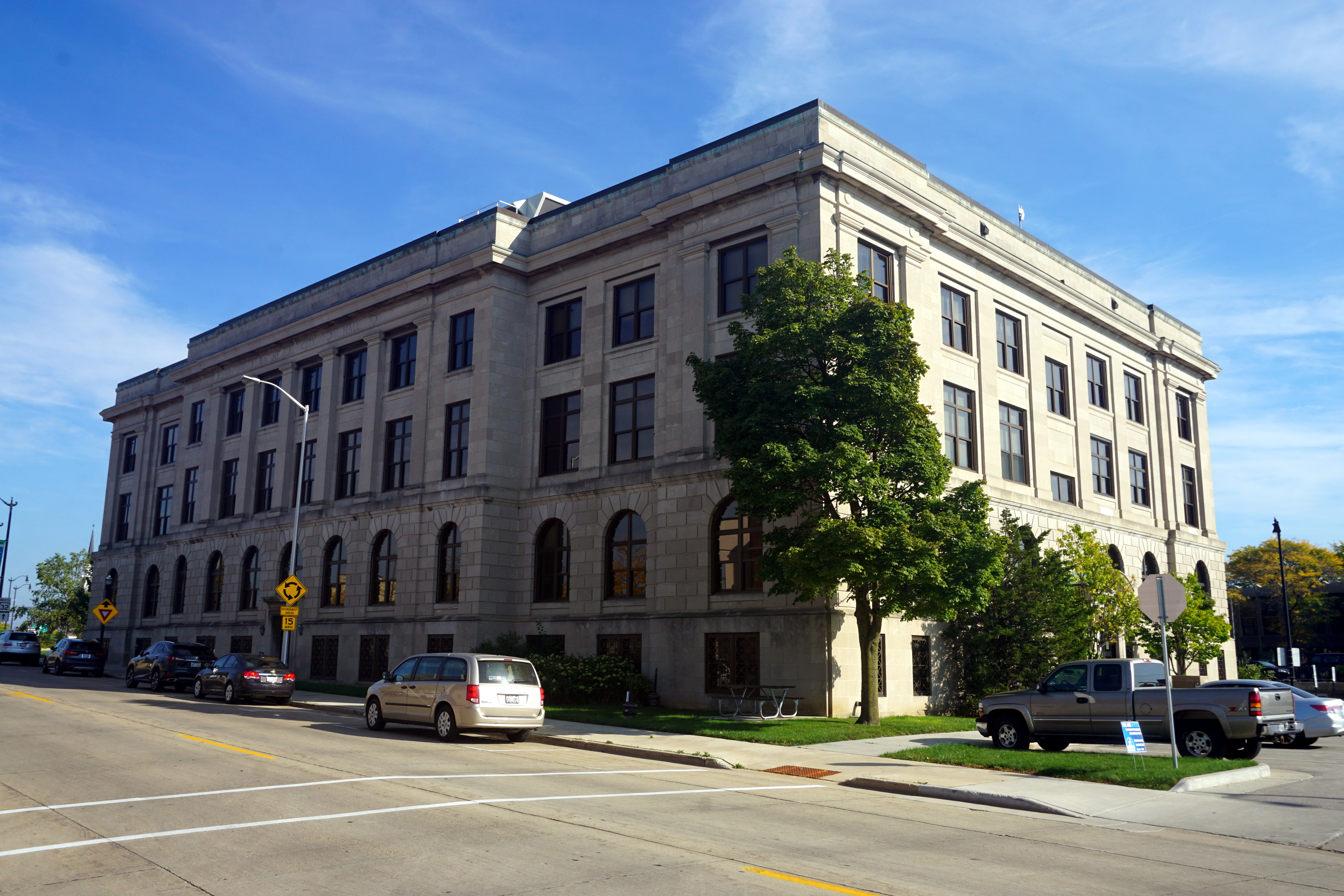
Racine City Hall

This is a list of mayors of Racine, Wisconsin, USA. Racine was originally incorporated as a village in 1841 before Wisconsin statehood. In the first term of the Wisconsin Legislature (1848), Racine was re-incorporated as a city. Racine has always since then utilized a mayor-council form of government. Mayors were initially elected every year; a two-year mayoral term was adopted in 1891, and a four-year term was implemented in 1991.

The first mayor of Racine was Reuben M. Norton, a pioneer businessman. The current mayor is Cory Mason, who previously represented Racine in the Wisconsin State Assembly. Racine's longest-serving mayor was Stephen F. Olsen, serving from 1973 to 1987. The most notable mayor was likely Walter Samuel Goodland (1911–1915), who went on to become governor of Wisconsin. The most locally famous mayor was likely Jerome Case (1856, 1858, 1860), who also established the Case Corporation which was a major employer in the city and whose name is still present on many local institutions, including Jerome I. Case High School.

== Village presidents (1841–1848) ==
The village of Racine was incorporated by an act of the Wisconsin Territory government signed into law on February 13, 1841. An election was held on April 6, 1841, to elect the first village government.

Order	President	Term start	Term end	Notes
X	Elias Smith	1841	1841	Elected but resigned at the time his term was scheduled to begin, April 12.
1	Charles S. Wright	1841	1842	Elected at May 5 special election.
2	Bushnell B. Gary	1842	1843	
3	Matthew B. Mead	1843	1844	
4	Warren Cole	1844	1845	
5	John A. Carswell	1845	1846	
6	Clark W. Spafard	1846	1847	
7	C. W. White	1847	1848	
8	Eli R. Cooley	1848	1848	

== Mayors with 1-year term (1848–1891) ==
Wisconsin achieved statehood in May 1848, and the 1st Wisconsin Legislature met in June. At that session, they approved an act to re-incorporate Racine as a city, which was signed by Governor Nelson Dewey on August 8, 1848. The first city election was held in October of that year. Unless otherwise indicated, Wisconsin's mayoral elections have always taken place on the first Tuesday of April, with inauguration following within two weeks.

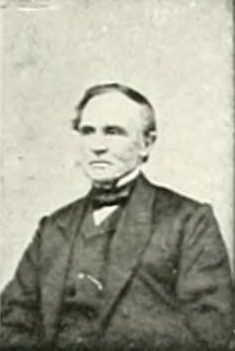
Reuben M. Norton, first mayor of Racine

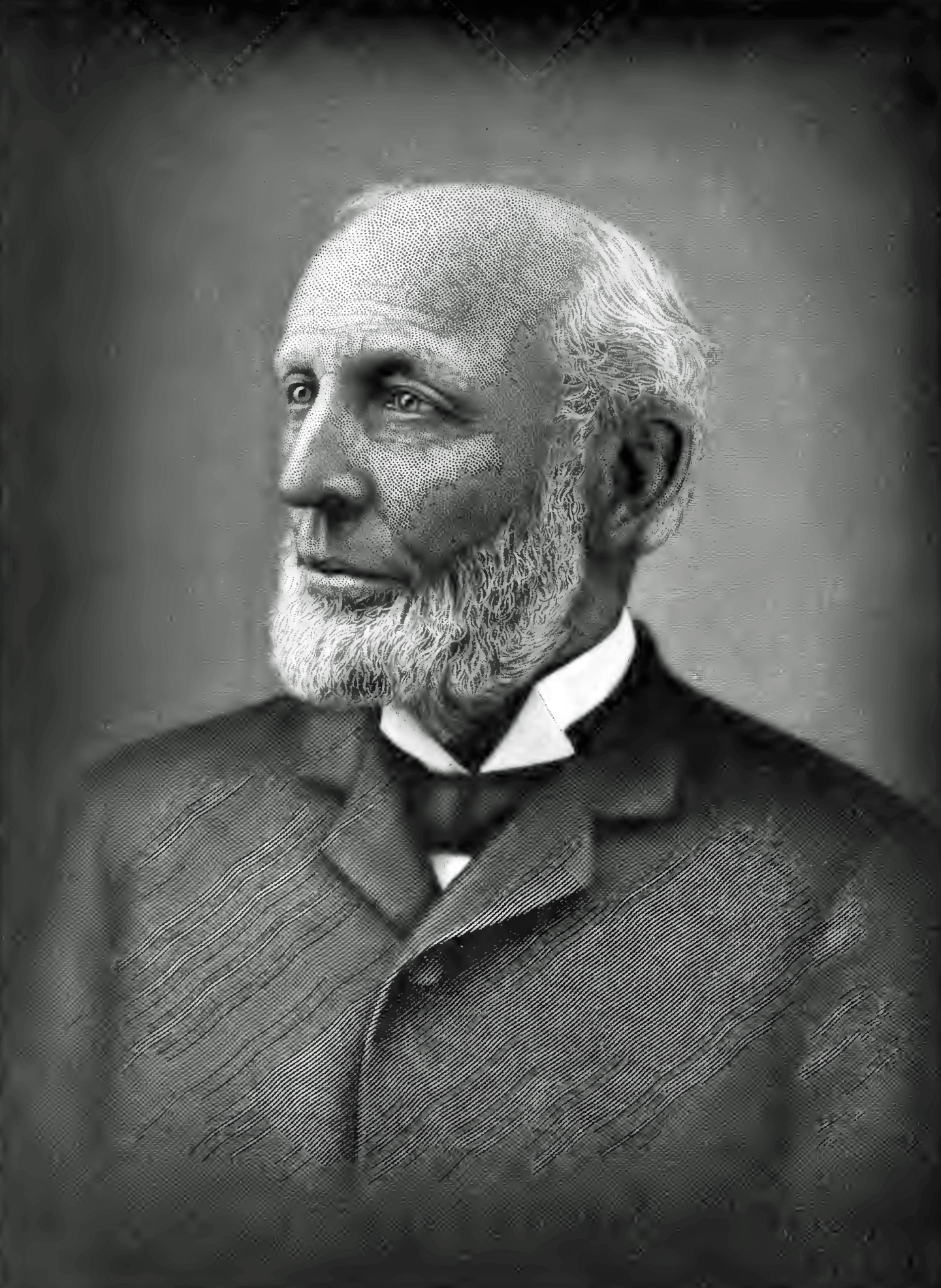
Jerome Case, the 8th, 10th, and 12th mayor of Racine and founder of the Case Corporation

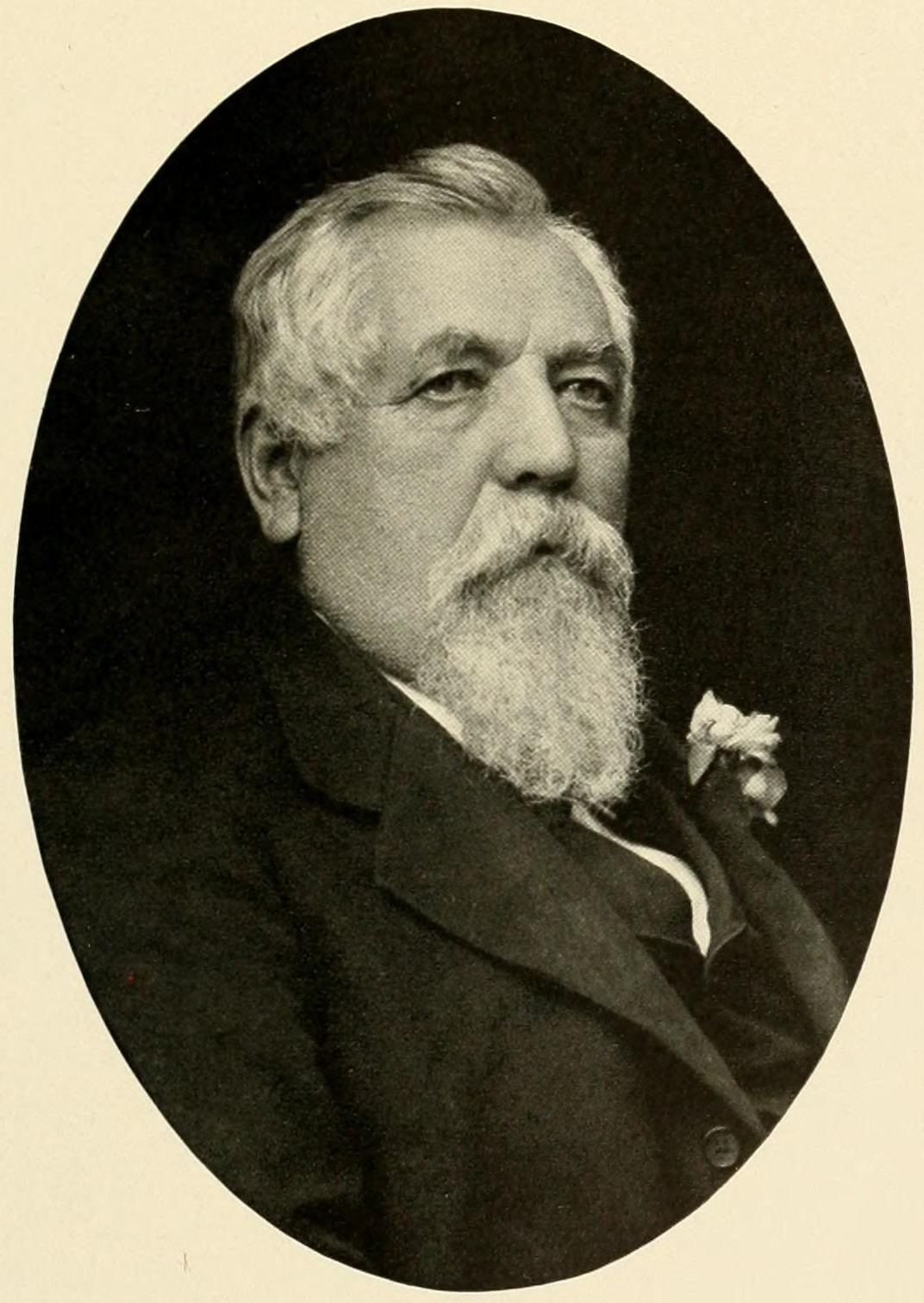
Martin Mathias Secor, the 28th and 31st mayor of Racine

Order	Mayor	Term start	Term end	Notes
1	Reuben M. Norton	1848	1849	Elected in October 1848.
2	Henry Bryan	1849	1850	
3	Eli R. Cooley	1850	1851	
4	William H. Waterman	1851	1852	
5	William T. Richmond	1852	1853	
6	David McDonald	1853	1855	First two-term mayor.
7	George Wustum	1855	1856	
8	Jerome I. Case	1856	1857	
9	John W. Cary	1857	1858	
10	Jerome I. Case	1858	1859	
11	William W. Vaughan	1859	1860	
12	Jerome I. Case	1860	1861	First three-term mayor.
13	George C. Northrop	1861	1862	
14	Alvin Raymond	1862	1863	
15	George C. Northrop	1863	1864	
16	Thomas Falvey	1864	1865	
17	John W. Hart	1865	1866	
18	George A. Thompson	1866	1869	First mayor to serve three consecutive terms.
19	Massena B. Erskine	1869	1872	
20	Reuben G. Doud	1872	1874	
21	Robert Hall Baker	1874	1875	
22	Reuben G. Doud	1875	1876	
23	John G. Meachem	1876	1879	
24	Ernest J. Hueffner	1879	1880	
25	Massena B. Erskine	1880	1881	
26	William P. Packard	1881	1883	
27	Titus G. Fish	1883	1884	
28	Martin Mathias Secor	1884	1885	
29	Joseph Miller	1885	1886	
30	Daniel A. Olin	1886	1888	
31	Martin Mathias Secor	1888	1889	
32	Frank L. Mitchell	1889	1890	
33	Adolph Weber	1890	1891	

== Mayors with 2-year term (1891–1991) ==
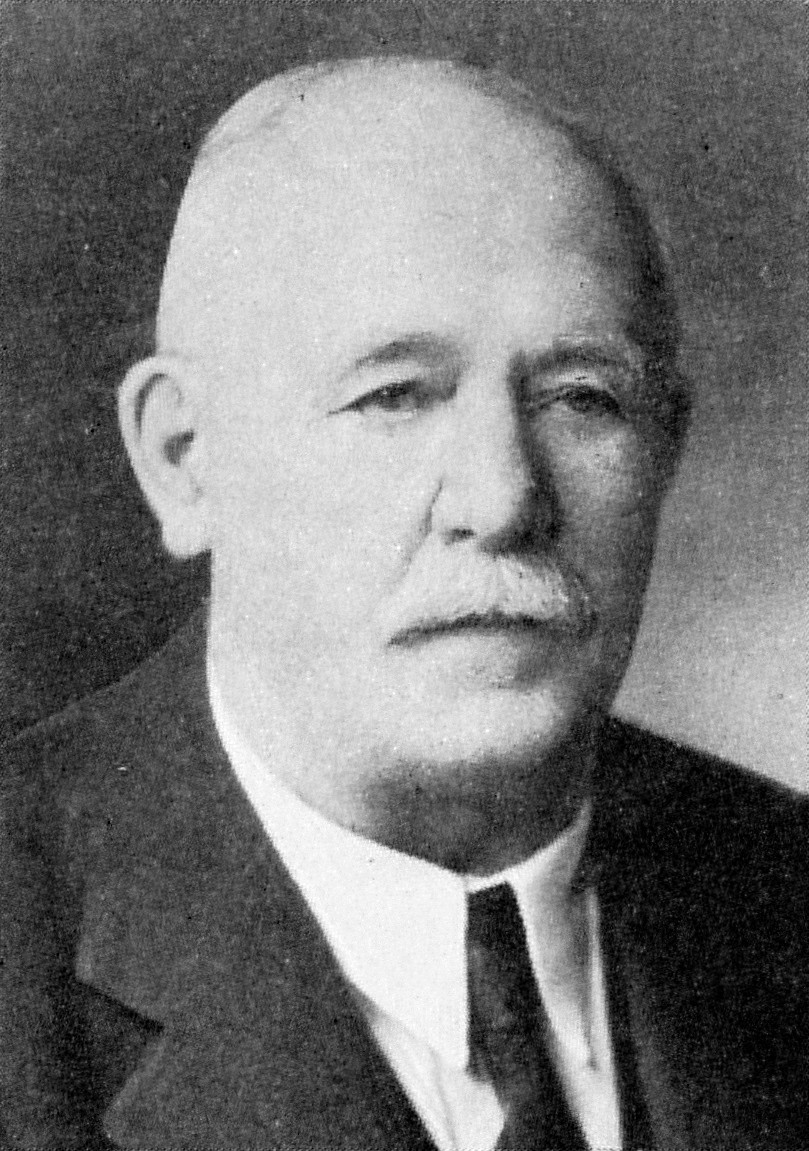
Walter Samuel Goodland, 40th mayor of Racine and 31st governor of Wisconsin

Order	Mayor	Term start	Term end	Notes
34	Jackson I. Case	1891	1895	
35	David G. Janes	1895	1897	
36	Fred Graham	1897	1899	
37	Michael Higgins Jr.	1899	1903	
38	Peter B. Nelson	1903	1907	Elected 1903, 1905.
39	Alex J. Horlick	1907	1911	Elected 1907, 1909.
40	Walter Samuel Goodland	1911	1915	Elected 1911, 1913.
41	T. William Thiesen	1915	1919	Elected 1915, 1917.
42	William H. Armstrong	1919	1921	Elected 1919.
43	A. J. Lunt	1921	1923	Elected 1921.
44	William H. Armstrong	1923	1931	Elected 1923, 1925, 1927, 1929. First five-term mayor.
45	William J. Swoboda	1931	1937	Elected 1931, 1933, 1935.
46	Roy A. Spencer	1937	1939	Elected 1937.
47	T. G. Morris	1939	1943	Elected 1939, 1941.
48	Francis H. Wendt	1943	1949	Elected 1943, 1945, 1947.
49	John E. Gothner	1949	1955	Elected 1949, 1951, 1953.
50	Jack H. Humble	1955	1963	Elected 1955, 1957, 1959, 1961.
51	William H. Beyer	1963	1969	Elected 1963, 1965, 1967.
52	Kenneth L. Huck	1969	1973	Elected 1969, 1971.
53	Stephen F. Olsen	1973	1987	Elected 1973, 1975, 1977, 1979, 1981, 1983, 1985. First mayor to serve seven terms. Racine's longest-serving mayor.
54	N. Owen Davies	1987	1995	Elected 1987, 1989.

== Mayors with 4-year term (1991–present) ==
In 1989, Racine's city council voted to double the mayoral term from two years to four years.

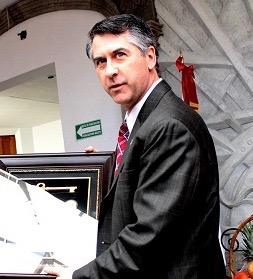
John Dickert, 57th mayor of Racine

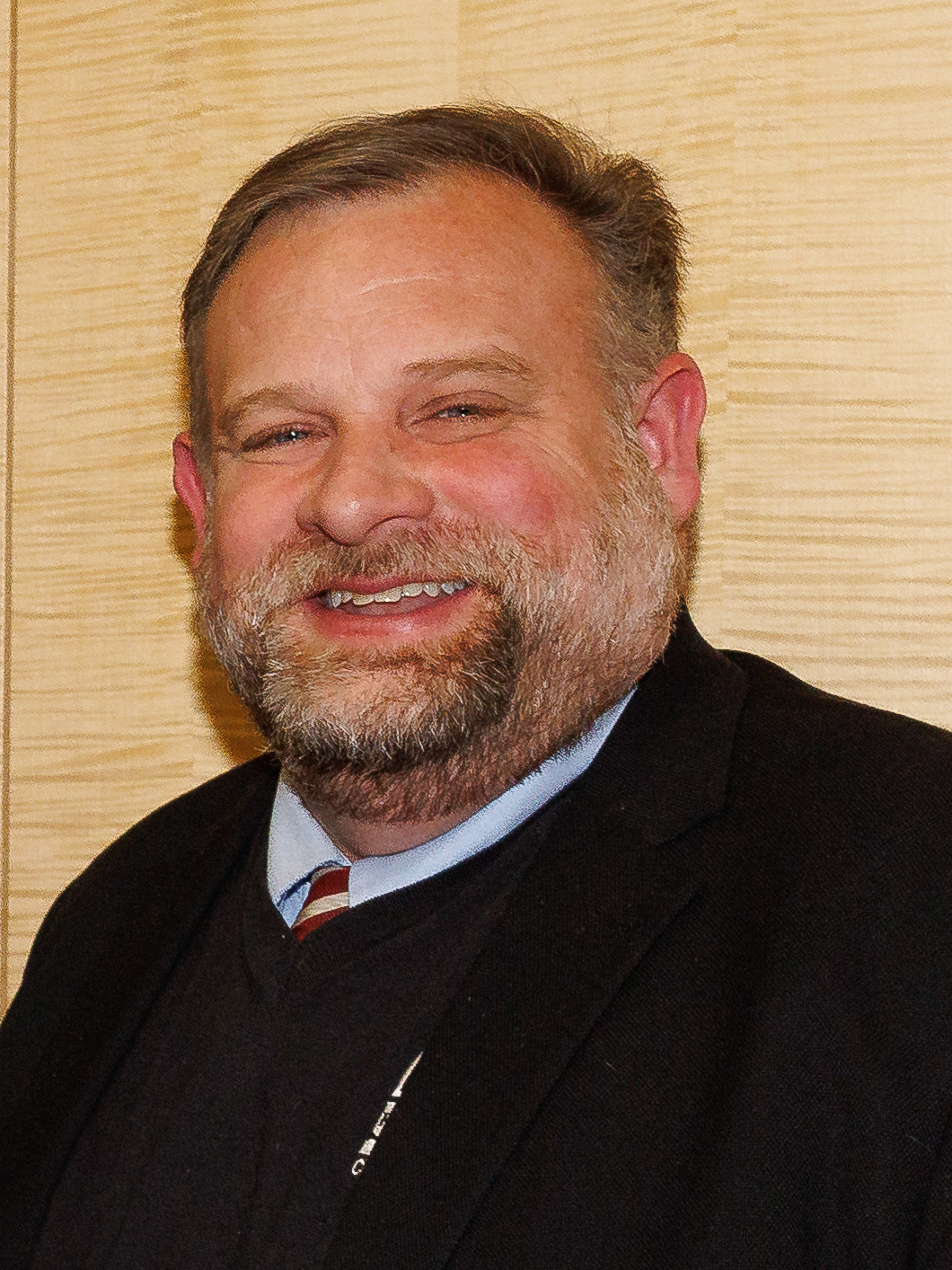
Cory Mason, 58th mayor of Racine

Order	Mayor	Term start	Term end	Notes
54	N. Owen Davies	1987	1995	Re-elected 1991.
55	James M. Smith	1995	2003	Elected 1995, 1999.
56	Gary E. Becker	2003	2007	Elected 2003, 2007. Indicted and resigned in January 2009.
-	Tom Friedel	2009	2009	Interim mayor elected by city council January 30, 2009.
57	John Dickert	2009	2017	Elected in May 5, 2009, special election. Re-elected 2011, 2015. Resigned July 2017.
-	Dennis Wiser	2017	2017	Acting mayor due to succession ordinance (was city council president at the time of Dickert's resignation).
58	Cory Mason	2017	present	Elected in October 17, 2017, special election. Re-elected 2019, 2023.

== See also ==
- Racine, Wisconsin
- Racine County, Wisconsin
- Political subdivisions of Wisconsin
