= Robert Hall Baker =

American businessman and politician

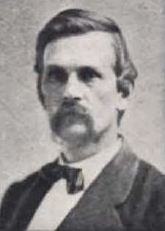

Member of the Wisconsin Senate from the 5th district
- In office January 4, 1875 – January 1, 1877
- Preceded by: Charles Herrick
- Succeeded by: Isaac W. Van Schaick
- In office January 6, 1873 – September 1873
- Preceded by: Philo Belden
- Succeeded by: Charles Herrick

Chairman of the Republican Party of Wisconsin
- In office October 1879 – September 1881
- Preceded by: Horace Rublee
- Succeeded by: Edward Sanderson

21st Mayor of Racine, Wisconsin
- In office April 1874 – April 1875
- Preceded by: Reuben G. Doud
- Succeeded by: Reuben G. Doud

Member of the City Council of Racine, Wisconsin
- In office April 1871 – April 1872
- In office April 1868 – April 1869
- In office April 1865 – April 1866

Personal details
- Born: June 27, 1839 Lake Geneva, Wisconsin, U.S.
- Died: October 5, 1882 (aged 43) Racine, Wisconsin, U.S.
- Resting place: Mound Cemetery, Racine
- Party: Republican
- Spouse: Emily M. Carswell (m. 1859–1882)
- Children: Mary Louise (Richards)^{(b. 1862; died 1940)}; George Carswell Baker^{(b. 1865; died 1886)}; Edward Larrabee Baker^{(b. 1869; died 1949)}; Robert Hall Baker Jr.^{(b. 1870; died 1911)}; Charles Henry Baker^{(b. 1873; died 1946)}
- Parent: Charles Minton Baker (father)
- Occupation: Manufacturing businessman

Robert Hall Baker Sr. (June 27, 1839 – October 5, 1882) was an American businessman and Republican politician from Racine, Wisconsin. He was the 21st mayor of Racine, Wisconsin, and represented Racine County for three years in the Wisconsin Senate (1873, 1875, 1876). He also served as chairman of the Republican Party of Wisconsin in 1880 and 1881. In business, he was one of the four principal owners of the J. I. Case Company, an important business in the growth and development of the city of Racine.

== Biography ==
Born in Geneva, Walworth County, Wisconsin Territory, to Martha Washington Larrabee and Charles Minton Baker. His father was a lawyer, judge, and politician. Baker attended Beloit College and assisted his father's law practice in Lake Geneva before moving to Racine.

Robert married Emily M. Carswell in 1859 and they had five children. They resided in Racine at the corner of 6th and Main Street, now the site of the U.S. Post Office.

In 1856, he entered business in Racine hardware supply, then worked for one year with Thomas Falvey, a reaper manufacturer. He then went to work for the J. I. Case Company in 1860 as a collecting agent.

In January 1863, Baker purchased a one quarter stake in the J. I. Case Company, becoming one of the four major shareholders in the company, the others being Massena B. Erskine, Stephen Bull, and Jerome Case himself.

In Racine, Baker was elected to the City Council in 1865, and was elected school commissioner in 1867. He two more terms on the City Council in 1868 and 1871, and was elected mayor in 1874. He won election to the Wisconsin Senate in 1872, defeating Democrat Nicholas D. Fratt. In 1873, he was the Republican candidate for Lieutenant Governor of Wisconsin, losing to Charles D. Parker. In 1874 he was elected to return to the Senate, defeating incumbent Liberal Republican Charles Herrick. Baker was chairman of the Republican Party of Wisconsin during the presidential campaign of James Garfield, and was appointed government director of the Union Pacific Railroad by Garfield after he became president. He held this office until his death in 1882.

He was a director of the Racine Hardware Manufacturing Company, a director of the Manufacturers National Bank of Racine and the National Iron Company of De Pere, Wisconsin, and president of the Hampton Coal Mining Company.

== Electoral history ==
=== Wisconsin Senate (1872) ===
Wisconsin Senate, 5th District Election, 1872
Party	Candidate	Votes	%	±%
Republican	Robert Hall Baker	2,922	59.72%	+6.91pp
Democratic	Nicholas D. Fratt	1,971	40.28%	−6.91pp
Total votes		4,893	100.0%	+13.68%
Republican hold				

=== Wisconsin Lieutenant Governor (1873) ===
Wisconsin Lieutenant Gubernatorial Election, 1873
Party	Candidate	Votes	%	±%
Democratic	Charles D. Parker	80,212	54.41%	
Republican	Robert Hall Baker	67,208	45.59%	
Total votes		147,420	100.0%	
Democratic gain from Republican				

=== Wisconsin Senate (1874) ===
Wisconsin Senate, 5th District Election, 1874
Party	Candidate	Votes	%	±%
Republican	Robert Hall Baker	2,706	55.96%	+17.42pp
Liberal Republican	Charles Herrick	2,130	44.04%	−17.42pp
Total votes		4,836	100.0%	+22.68%
Republican gain from Liberal Republican				

Party political offices
Preceded by Milton Pettit	Republican nominee for Lieutenant Governor of Wisconsin; 1873	Succeeded by Henry L. Eaton
Preceded by Horace Rublee	Chairman of the Republican Party of Wisconsin; October 1879 – September 1881	Succeeded by Edward Sanderson
Wisconsin Senate
Preceded by Philo Belden	Member of the Wisconsin Senate from the 5th district January 6, 1873 – September 1873	Succeeded by Charles Herrick
Preceded by Charles Herrick	Member of the Wisconsin Senate from the 5th district January 4, 1875 – January 1, 1877	Succeeded by Isaac W. Van Schaick
Political offices
Preceded by Reuben G. Doud	Mayor of Racine, Wisconsin; April 1874 – April 1875	Succeeded by Reuben G. Doud
