= Mound Cemetery (Racine, Wisconsin) =

Cemetery in Racine, Wisconsin

- Interactive map of Mound Cemetery

Details
- Established: June 3, 1852
- Location: 1147 West Blvd, Racine, Wisconsin
- Country: US
- Coordinates: 42.720520°N 87.812600°W
- Size: 55 acres (22 ha)
- No. of interments: >2,600
- Find a Grave: Mound Cemetery

Mound Cemetery is a 55-acre burial site located in Racine, Wisconsin. Established in 1852, it was previously the site of approximately 138 prehistoric effigies and burial mounds. Mound Cemetery now contains over 2,600 burials, including many of the most prominent citizens from the history of Racine.

== History ==
The namesake burial mounds are believed to be over a thousand years old. Only fourteen of the original burial mounds remain on the cemetery grounds. The remaining effigy mounds are shaped like lizards and surrounded by circular burial mounds.

The site of Mound Cemetery was first purchased in 1834 by Joseph Antoine Ouilmette, a fur trader believed to have been of French and Native American ancestry. It was sold in 1851 to white settlers Norman Clark and James Kinzie. At the time of the sale, Ouilmette described the site as the "burial place of his fathers", leaving the impression that the burial site had previously been utilized by the Potawatomi.

Mound Cemetery was officially dedicated on June 3, 1852, with the land originally divided into 1,768 burial plots.

On May 12, 1976, Mound Cemetery was designated as an official landmark of the city of Racine.

A 1985 act of the Wisconsin Legislature set new requirements for the treatment of all human remains in such sites, regardless of cultural or ethnic origin, and established that sites were not to be disturbed without a permit from the Wisconsin Historical Society.

== Notable interments ==
- Harold C. Agerholm (1925–1944), USMC, Medal of Honor recipient.
- Robert Hall Baker (1839–1882), businessman, Racine mayor, Wisconsin state senator, major shareholder of the Case Corporation.
- Lucius S. Blake (1816–1894), businessman, "father of Racine industry".
- Jerome Case (1819–1891), businessman, Racine mayor, founder of the Case Corporation.
- Henry Allen Cooper (1850–1931), U.S. congressman.
- James Rood Doolittle (1815–1897), United States senator.
- Reuben G. Doud (1830–1877), businessman, Racine mayor.
- Nicholas D. Fratt (1825–1910), businessman, Wisconsin state senator, gubernatorial candidate.
- William Horlick (1846–1936), businessman, creator of Malted milk.
- Gilbert Knapp (1798–1887), sailor, founder of Racine.
- John G. McMynn (1824–1900), 7th Superintendent of Public Instruction of Wisconsin.
- Timothy D. Morris (1818–1876), Wisconsin state senator, Racine sheriff during the Joshua Glover affair.
- Reuben M. Norton (1796–1884), first mayor of Racine.
- Albert L. Phillips (1824–1893), Wisconsin state senator.
- Martin Mathias Secor (1841–1911), businessman, Racine mayor.
- Henry Stevens (1818–1875), Wisconsin state senator.
