= Senator Herrick =

Senator Herrick may refer to:

- Charles Herrick (1814–1886), Wisconsin State Senate
- Ebenezer Herrick (1785–1839), Maine State Senate
- Walter R. Herrick (1877–1953), New York State Senate
