= James Doolittle =

James Doolittle may refer to:

- James R. Doolittle (1815–1897), U.S. senator from Wisconsin, 1857–1869
- Jimmy Doolittle (1896–1993), U.S. Army general and aviator
