= Horatio T. Taylor =

19th century American politician

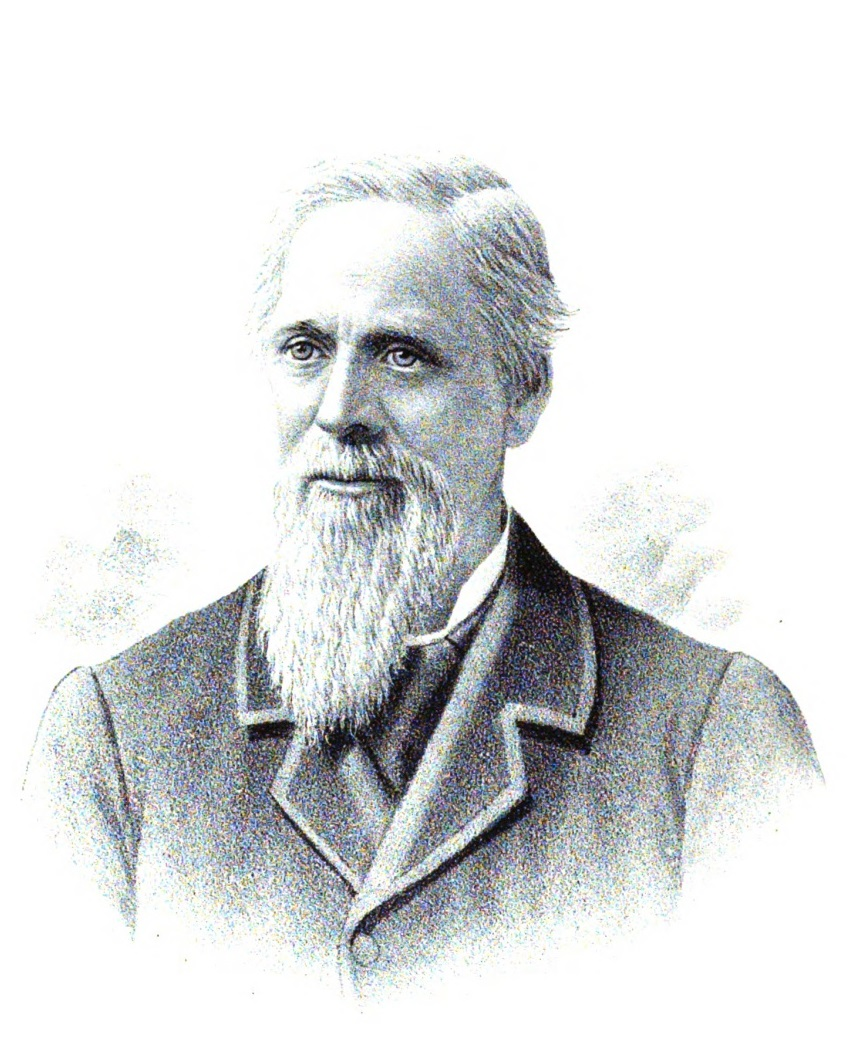
- From Portrait and Biographical Album of Racine and Kenosha Counties (1892)

Member of the Wisconsin State Assembly from the Racine 1st district
- In office January 5, 1863 – January 4, 1864
- Preceded by: Calvin H. Upham
- Succeeded by: George C. Northrop

Sheriff of Racine County, Wisconsin
- In office January 1, 1861 – January 5, 1863
- Preceded by: William G. Everit
- Succeeded by: Aaron S. French

Personal details
- Born: June 13, 1827 Batavia, New York, U.S.
- Died: April 27, 1905 (aged 77) Winnetka, Illinois, U.S.
- Cause of death: Stroke
- Resting place: Mound Cemetery, Racine, Wisconsin
- Party: Republican; Democratic (before 1854)
- Spouse: Maria Campbell (m. 1850; died 1876)
- Children: Henry H. Taylor; Ida (Dyer); 1 other
- Occupation: Merchant, salesman

Horatio Theodore Taylor (June 13, 1827 – April 27, 1905) was an American merchant, salesman, and Wisconsin pioneer. He was an early settler at Racine, Wisconsin, and represented the city in the Wisconsin State Assembly during the 1863 session. He also served as sheriff of Racine County, and was an early employee of the J. I. Case Company.

== Biography ==
Horatio T. Taylor was born June 13, 1827, in Batavia, New York. He was sent to study at an academy in Rochester, New York, and later at Clarence Hollow. When he was just 14 years old, in 1841, he traveled west to the Wisconsin Territory and went to work as a salesman for Lee & Dickson, the first mercantile house in Racine. He worked for ten years, then, in 1851, opened a grocery store, which he operated successfully for thirty years.

He was a member of the Racine County board of supervisors in 1856, 1873, 1874, 1875, and 1876. He was also a school commissioner in 1865, 1867, and 1869. And served as city assessor in 1870. He was appointed a deputy sheriff of Racine County in 1857, and simultaneously served as deputy U.S. marshal.

Taylor was originally an anti-slavery Democrat, but abandoned the party after the Kansas–Nebraska Act, and joined the new Republican Party. In 1860, he was the Republican nominee for sheriff of Racine County, and was elected with much of the rest of the Republican ticket.

Rather than running for re-election as sheriff, in 1862, Taylor ran for Wisconsin State Assembly, and was elected to represent Racine County's first Assembly district—comprising just the city of Racine. He did not run for re-election in 1863.

He as an associate of Jerome Case through religious and political affairs, and in 1875 he went to work for the J. I. Case Company. He worked nine years as a traveling salesman for Case, and then worked in the stock department of the company for a number of years until his retirement.

After a period of poor health, Taylor went to live at the home of his daughter, Ida Dyer, in Winnetka, Illinois. He suffered a stroke there in 1904, and was largely incapacitated until his death in April 1905.

== Personal life and family ==
Horatio T. Taylor was a son of George Taylor and his wife Lydia (née Markham). His paternal grandfather, William Taylor, served in the Rhode Island militia through seven years of the American Revolutionary War, and participated in the Battle of Bunker Hill.

Horatio Taylor had at least two siblings, who also came to live in Wisconsin.

He married Maria Campbell, the daughter of another Wisconsin pioneer, on November 28, 1850. They had three children together, though one child died young. His wife died in 1876.

Wisconsin State Assembly
Preceded by Calvin H. Upham	Members of the Wisconsin State Assembly from the Racine 1st district January 5, 1863 – January 4, 1864	Succeeded by George C. Northrop
Legal offices
Preceded by William G. Everit	Sheriff of Racine County, Wisconsin; January 1, 1861 – January 5, 1863	Succeeded by Aaron S. French
