= United States Congressional Joint Special Committee on Conditions of Indian Tribes =

Committee formed on March 3, 1865

The Joint Special Committee on Conditions of Indian Tribes was formed on March 3, 1865, by resolution of both houses of U.S. Congress for the purpose of "directing an inquiry into the condition of the Indian tribes and their treatment by the civil and military authorities of the United States". The Senate resolution was sponsored by James Rood Doolittle who was then the Chairman of the Senate Committee on Indian Affairs. He became the Chairman of the new Joint Special Committee, leading it to be called the "Doolittle Committee."

The Committee reported its findings to the Senate on January 26, 1867. It was ordered that the report be printed, and it was eventually published together with a lengthy Appendix containing much of the testimony collected during the investigation.

== Background ==
The push for a thorough investigation of the condition and treatment of Indigenous Peoples throughout the country arose amid reports of government corruption following the 1864 Sand Creek Massacre (also known as the Chivington Massacre) in which an estimated 150–500 friendly Cheyenne and Arapaho people were murdered in their sleep by the U.S. Army in Colorado Territory. Several other investigations were spawned by this massacre, including one in 1865 by the Joint Committee on the Conduct of the War, which criticized the Indian Bureau and the Interior Department under which the Committee was situated. Public calls emerged for the Indian Bureau to be moved back under the War Department, from which it had been transferred to the Interior Department when it was created in 1849.

== Methods ==
The Doolittle Committee consisted of seven committee members, three of whom were Senators and four of whom were House Representatives. The members divided U.S. States and Territories into three groups, forming subcommittees to investigate each area.

Members	Regions
Sen. James Rood Doolittle (WI) – Chairman Sen. Lafayette Sabine Foster (CT) – Vice President Rep. Lewis Winans Ross (IL)	Kansas Indian Territory Colorado (territory) New Mexico (territory) Utah (territory)
Sen. James Willis Nesmith (OR) Rep. William Higby (CA)	California Oregon Nevada Washington (territory) Idaho (territory) Montana (territory)
Rep. William Windom (MN) Rep. Asahel Wheeler Hubbard (IA)	Minnesota Nebraska (territory) Dakota (territory) Upper Montana (territory)

The committee pursued their investigations in a number of ways. They first took sworn testimony from Colorado officials connected to the Sand Creek Massacre during hearings in Washington, D.C., on March 7–8, 1865. Next, they traveled to many of the areas in question to take testimony in person from a variety of stakeholders, including military personnel, Indian Agents and Superintendents, clergymen, members of the tribes themselves, and non-Indigenous civilian settlers. In August 1865, Senators Doolittle and Foster, and Representative Ross, visited Fort Lyon to confer with the tribes there regarding the Sand Creek Massacre.

They also sought testimony about U.S.-Native American relations in writing through letters to regional authorities and other knowledgeable people in areas where they were unable to visit. In addition to general requests for information and testimony, the committee compiled a list of 23 questions that Senator Doolittle sent out by means of a circular. Dated May 10, 1865, it asked recipients to respond in writing by September 1, 1865.

The committee members completed their field investigations in the fall of 1865. In March 1866, the subcommittees' reports and some of the relevant documentation were printed by the Government Printing Office. The document totaled 532 pages and would later become the final report's Appendix. However, the report would not be completed until the following January, after the committee came under pressure by the media who had begun publishing controversial excerpts from the leaked Appendix.

== Report ==
Senator Doolittle finally completed the 10-page report and read it in the Senate, which ordered it to be printed, on January 26, 1867. It was eventually published together with the Appendix as Condition of the Indian Tribes: Report of the Joint Special Committee, Appointed under Joint Resolution of March 3, 1865: With an Appendix. As Senator Doolittle spearheaded the committee, its report came to be known as the "Doolittle Report."

== Conclusions ==
The report outlines five main conclusions of the committee:

1. Except in the Indian Territories, Indigenous populations were declining rapidly at the time. Causes of Indigenous population decline included disease, wars, loss of land area and the encroachment of white populations leading to reduced food supply in the form of game, and mistreatment by U.S. authorities.
2. Wars by white people against Indigenous tribes were destructive and often became wars "of extermination," with the authors noting the frequency with which Indigenous people were "slaughtered indiscriminately". The committee members determined that a large majority of the conflicts with Indigenous tribes were directly caused by "lawless white men".
3. The effects of human migration, due to settlers seeking gold and land, and the construction Transcontinental Railroad lines, had negative impacts on the availability of game. Bison were specifically affected, which was a principle food source for Indigenous Peoples of the Great Plains. The inability of authorities to enforce laws in sparsely populated areas also led to conflicts between Indigenous groups and white settlers, who ignored territorial boundaries in their search for gold or land on which to settle.
4. Recommendation that the Indian Bureau should remain as part of the Department of the Interior, rather than being moved back under the War Department.
5. Recommendation to pass a pending Senate bill, which would subdivide the states and territories overseen by the Indian Bureau into five districts and create five inspection boards to oversee them.

== Aftermath ==
A few days after the report was read in the Senate, the House Military Committee signaled that they would support a bill to move the Indian Bureau back under the War Department. When the bill came to the Senate the following month, Senator Doolittle vehemently opposed it. He argued that it would be better policy in both fiscal and humanitarian terms to move forward with Boards of Inspection to ease relations between the U.S. Government and Indigenous tribes, rather than to continue warring with them.

While Senator Doolittle's proposed legislation was not successful, the committee's report brought to light the corruption in the Indian Bureau as well as the poor treatment of Native Americans by the U.S. military and civilians and its impact on their populations. The investigation was significant in shifting the public debate about Native American affairs toward reform.
