= Charles Minton Baker =

19th century American lawyer and politician

The Honorable Charles M. Baker
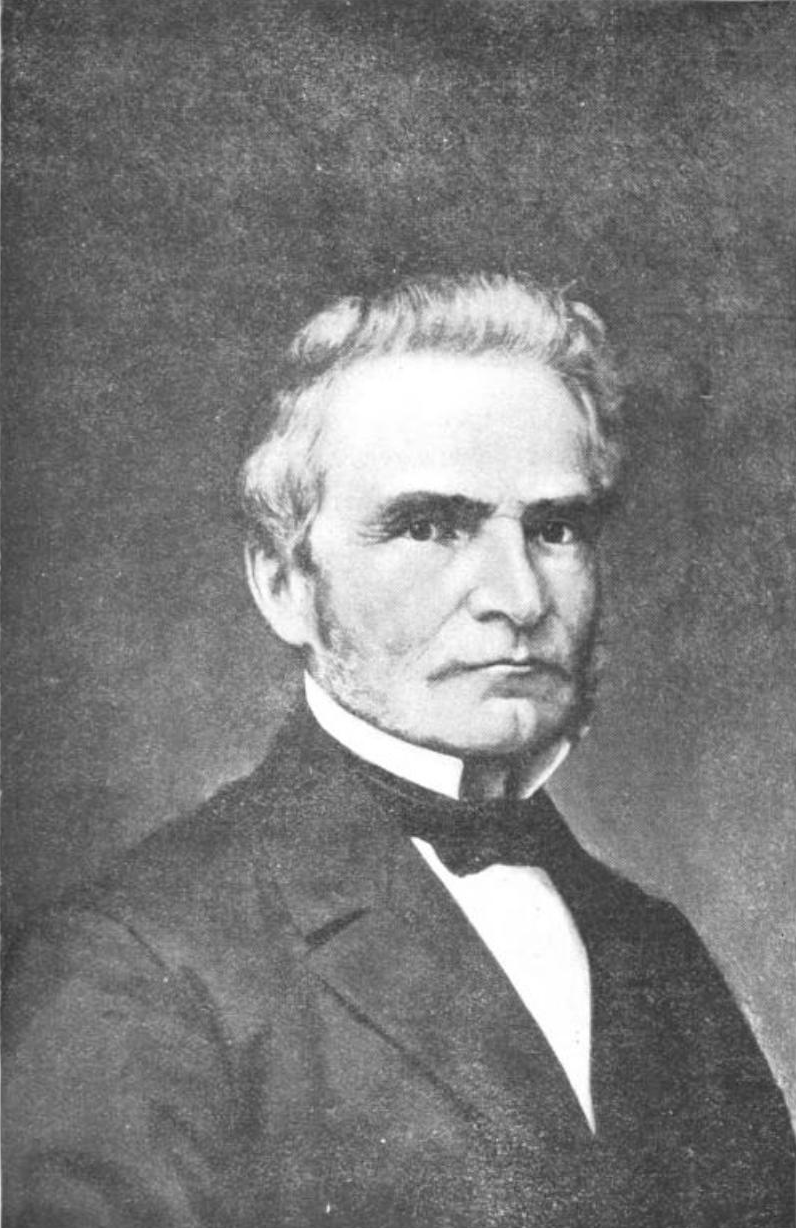

Wisconsin Circuit Court Judge for the 1st circuit
- In office March 1856 – April 1856
- Appointed by: William A. Barstow
- Preceded by: James Rood Doolittle
- Succeeded by: James M. Keep

Member of the Council of the Wisconsin Territory from Rock and Walworth counties
- In office December 5, 1842 – January 4, 1847 Serving with Edward V. Whiton
- Preceded by: James Maxwell
- Succeeded by: Andrew Palmer (Rock); Henry Clark (Walworth)

Personal details
- Born: October 18, 1804 New York, New York, U.S.
- Died: February 5, 1872 (aged 67) Lake Geneva, Wisconsin, U.S.
- Resting place: Oak Hill Cemetery; Lake Geneva, Wisconsin
- Spouses: Martha Washington Larrabee (m. 1830; died 1843); Eliza Holt
- Children: Mary Louise Baker (Browne)^{(b. 1831; died 1895)}; Charles Henry Baker^{(b. 1834; died 1918)}; Edward Larrabee Baker^{(b. 1836; died 1891)}; Robert Hall Baker^{(b. 1839; died 1882)}; Henry Baker^{(b. 1841; died 1842)}; Martha Ellen Baker^{(b. 1843; died 1843)}
- Parents: James Baker (father); Elizabeth (Price) Baker (mother)
- Profession: lawyer

Charles Minton Baker (October 18, 1804 – February 5, 1872) was an American lawyer and politician. He served several years on the Council of the Legislative Assembly of the Wisconsin Territory and was a delegate to Wisconsin's first constitutional convention in 1846. After Wisconsin became a state, he briefly served as a Wisconsin circuit court judge. His son, Robert Hall Baker, became a prominent businessman and Republican politician in Racine, Wisconsin.

== Biography ==
The son of James and Elizabeth Price Baker, he was born in New York City but quickly moved with his family to Addison County, Vermont. In 1822, he entered Middlebury College, but had to leave without completing his first year due to health problems. In the fall 1823, he became a teaching assistant at a girls' school in Philadelphia, where he stayed for two years.

In 1826, he moved to Troy, New York, and began studying law under Samuel G. Huntington. He was admitted to the New York bar in 1830, and entered a law partnership with Henry W. Strong. His health failed again in 1834 and he returned to Vermont.

In 1838, Baker moved to the Wisconsin Territory, where he settled near Lake Geneva, in Walworth County. He was appointed district attorney for the county in 1839. He served on the Wisconsin Territorial Council from 1842 through 1846, and was a delegate to the first Wisconsin Constitutional Convention in 1846.

After Wisconsin became a state, in 1848, he was appointed by the new governor, Nelson Dewey, as one of three commissioners to revise and codify the laws of the state of Wisconsin. And, in 1849, the legislature appointed him to manage the printing of the code at Albany, New York.

He served briefly as a Wisconsin circuit court judge, when he was appointed in March 1856 to finish the last few weeks of the term of Judge James Rood Doolittle, who had resigned. During the American Civil War, he served as a Judge Advocate under Provost Marshal I. N. Bean, in the Wisconsin 1st district.

== Personal life and family ==
Baker married his first wife, Martha Washington Larrabee, September 6, 1830, while he was living in Troy, New York. They had six children before her death in 1843, though only four survived to adulthood. Baker later married Eliza Holt, who survived him.

His son Robert Hall Baker was also a prominent 19th century politician and businessman in southeastern Wisconsin. He was for several years Mayor of Racine, Wisconsin, represented the county in the Wisconsin State Senate, and became a major partner in the J. I. Case Company.

Charles Milton Baker died at his home in Geneva, Wisconsin, in January 1873. In 1928, his grandson Edward Larrabee Baker later published his grandfather's letters and memoirs under the title Charles Minton Baker and the Pioneer Trail.

The Wisconsin Historical Society possesses a photograph of Charles Minton Baker.

Legal offices
Preceded by James Rood Doolittle	Wisconsin Circuit Court Judge for the 1st circuit March 1856 – April 1856	Succeeded by James M. Keep
