= Reuben G. Doud =

19th century American politician

20th & 22nd Mayor of Racine, Wisconsin
- In office April 1875 – April 1876
- Preceded by: Robert Hall Baker
- Succeeded by: John G. Meachem
- In office April 1872 – April 1874
- Preceded by: Massena B. Erskine
- Succeeded by: Robert Hall Baker

Member of the Wisconsin State Assembly from the Waupaca County district
- In office January 11, 1865 – January 10, 1866
- Preceded by: Albert K. Osborn
- Succeeded by: Albert K. Osborn

Personal details
- Born: January 20, 1830 McGraw, New York, U.S.
- Died: September 30, 1877 (aged 47) Northern Hospital for the Insane, Oshkosh, Wisconsin, U.S.
- Resting place: Mound Cemetery, Racine, Wisconsin
- Party: Republican
- Spouse: Katharine Reynolds (m. 1864–1877)
- Children: Mary Elizabeth Doud; (b. 1864)
- Occupation: Businessman, politician

Reuben Griffin Doud Jr. (January 20, 1830 – September 30, 1877) was an American businessman, Republican politician, and Wisconsin pioneer. He was the 20th and 22nd mayor of Racine, Wisconsin. Earlier, he served in the Wisconsin State Assembly, representing Waupaca County during the 1865 term.

== Biography ==
Born in McGraw, New York, in Cortland County, to Reuben and Betsey McGraw Doud. In 1849, Doud moved to Wisconsin, first arriving in Racine, then traveling to Delavan, and finally settling near Green Bay. He entered the transportation business as a cabin boy on Fox River steamboats.

In 1856, he traveled to Pittsburgh, Pennsylvania, and purchased a steamboat, which he navigated down the Ohio River, up the Mississippi, to the Wisconsin River, and was the first boat to pass through the completed locks on the Fox River after the improvements had been completed that year. He made the same trip again in 1857, after building another steamboat in Pittsburgh, the Appleton Belle, which he then sold in Oshkosh. He then began building steamboats in Wisconsin, building and operating the Fountain City and Bay City, which traveled a route between Berlin, Oshkosh, Fond du Lac and Green Bay.

In 1861, he sold his interests on this existing transportation route and relocated to Gills Landing, Wisconsin, and became involved in the warehousing business there, and constructed a tannery. He continued to operate the steamboat Berlin City, on a route between Green Bay and New London, and, in 1863 and 1864, manufactured two new boats, the Northwestern and Tigress.

In 1866, he moved to Racine, Wisconsin, and began a partnership with Martin E. Tremble to enter the lumber industry. Tremble and Doud owned significant forested lands and operated a mill on the Big Suamico River, near Green Bay. He built two schooners, the Reuben Doud and M. E. Tremble, and purchased a third, Rainbow.

In 1877, while preparing a European trip with his family, Doud was hospitalized. He died at the Northern Hospital for the Insane in the town of Oshkosh, Wisconsin, September 30, 1877.

== Public office ==
In 1864, while living in Gills Landing, Doud was elected as a Republican to represent Waupaca County in the Wisconsin State Assembly for the 1865 session.

After moving to Racine, he was elected Mayor of the city in 1872, 1873, and 1875.

== Personal and family life ==
On September 15, 1864, Doud married Katharine Reynolds of Cortland, New York. They had one daughter, Mary Elizabeth.
