= 1871 Wisconsin gubernatorial election =

- November 7, 1871
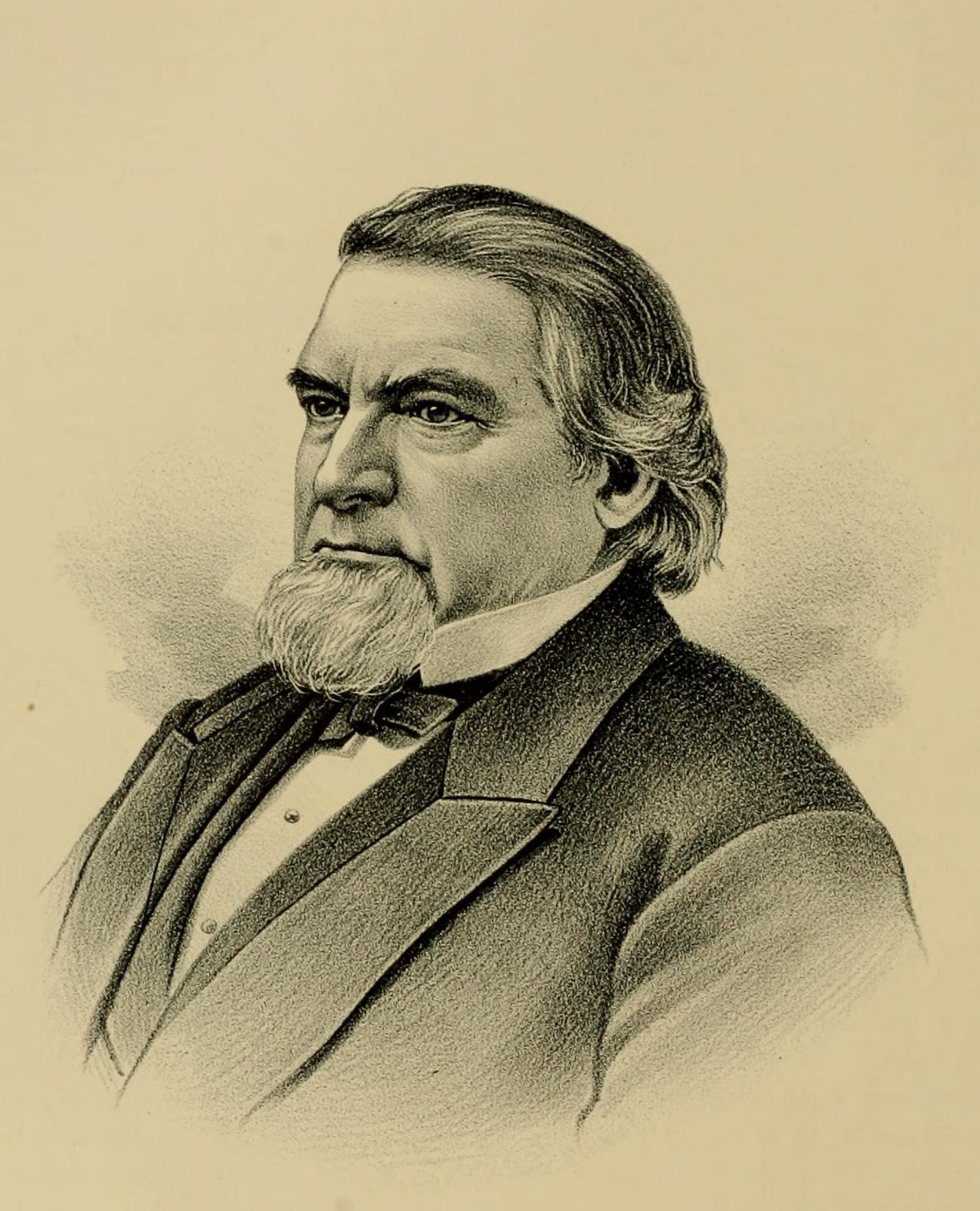

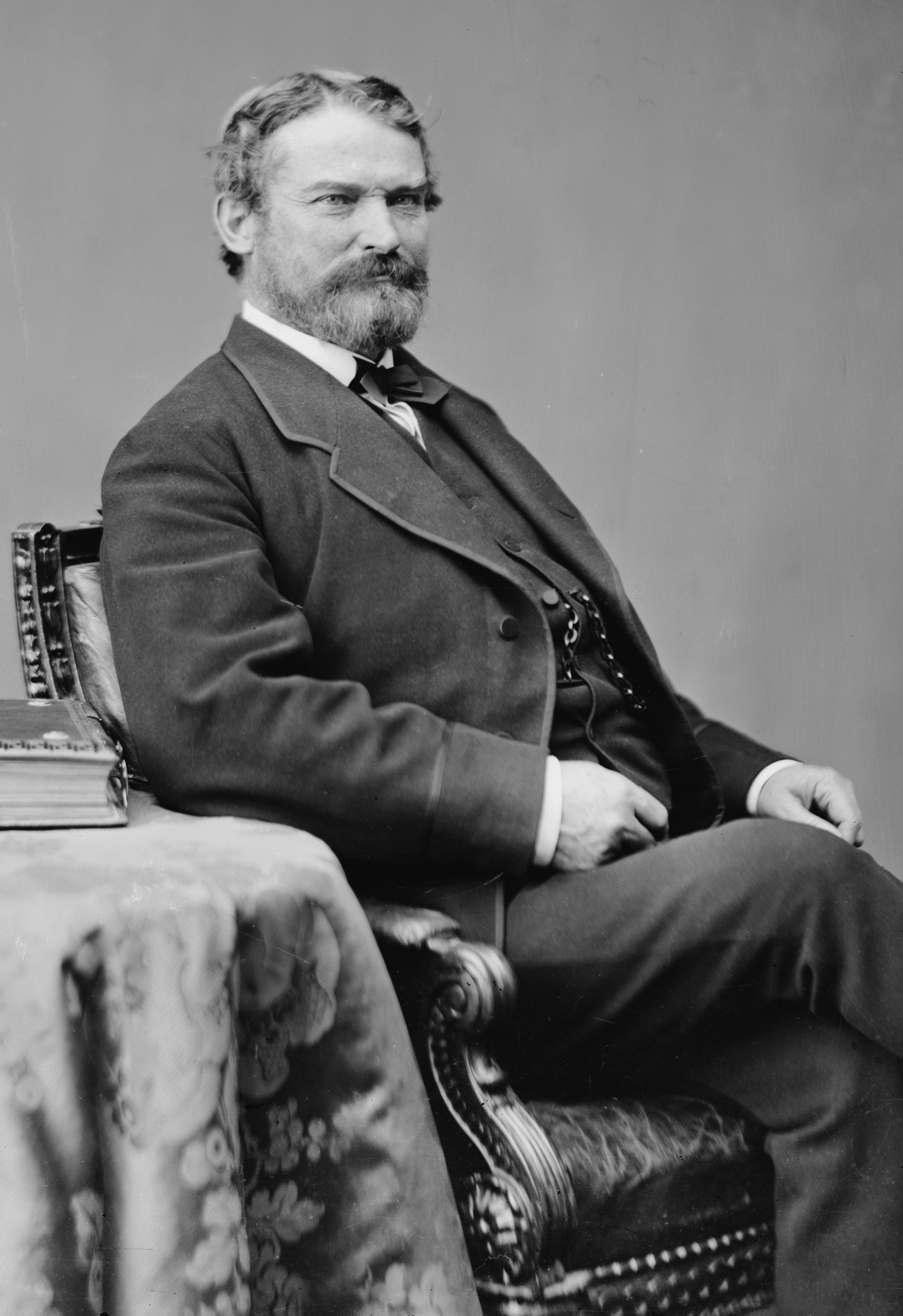
Nominee	Cadwallader C. Washburn	James Rood Doolittle
Party	Republican	Democratic
Popular vote	78,301	68,910
Percentage	53.17%	46.79%
- County results Washburn : 50–60% 60–70% 70–80% 80–90% >90% Doolittle : 50–60% 60–70% 70–80% 80–90%
Governor before election
Lucius Fairchild
Republican
Elected Governor
Cadwallader C. Washburn
Republican

The 1871 Wisconsin gubernatorial election was held on November 7, 1871. Republican Cadwallader C. Washburn was elected with 53% of the vote, defeating Democratic candidate James Rood Doolittle. Incumbent Governor Lucius Fairchild did not seek re-election.

Both major party candidates in this election had served as delegates to the Peace Conference of 1861 which attempted to avert the American Civil War.

== Nominations ==
=== Republican party ===
Cadwallader C. Washburn had just left office as Congressman for Wisconsin's 6th congressional district, having served a total of ten years in the United States House of Representatives. Between his years in Congress, Washburn had served as a Union Army general in the Civil War under Ulysses S. Grant.

=== Democratic party ===
James Rood Doolittle had served twelve years as a Republican United States Senator before becoming the Democratic Party's nominee for Governor in the 1871 election. Prior to his service in the U.S. Senate, Doolittle had been a Wisconsin Circuit Court Judge.

== Results ==
1871 Wisconsin gubernatorial election
Party	Candidate	Votes	%	±%
Republican	Cadwallader C. Washburn	78,301	53.17%	+0.02%
Democratic	James Rood Doolittle	68,910	46.79%	−0.04%
	Scattering	63	0.04%	
Majority		9,391	6.38%	
Total votes		147,274	100.00%	
Republican hold		Swing	+0.06%	

=== Results by county ===
County	C. C. Washburn Republican		James R. Doolittle Democratic		Scattering Write-in		Margin		Total votes cast
County	#	%	#	%	#	%	#	%	Total votes cast
Adams	719	72.19%	277	27.81%	0	0.00%	442	44.38%	996
Ashland	40	71.43%	16	28.57%	0	0.00%	24	42.86%	56
Barron	169	82.84%	35	17.16%	0	0.00%	134	65.69%	204
Bayfield	75	66.37%	38	33.63%	0	0.00%	37	32.74%	113
Brown	1,335	43.43%	1,739	56.57%	0	0.00%	-404	-13.14%	3,074
Buffalo	1,156	69.51%	507	30.49%	0	0.00%	649	39.03%	1,663
Burnett	198	90.00%	22	10.00%	0	0.00%	176	80.00%	220
Calumet	636	35.83%	1,139	64.17%	0	0.00%	-503	-28.34%	1,775
Chippewa	696	44.99%	851	55.01%	0	0.00%	-155	-10.02%	1,547
Clark	377	70.86%	154	28.95%	1	0.19%	223	41.92%	532
Columbia	2,248	58.69%	1,579	41.23%	3	0.08%	669	17.47%	3,830
Crawford	814	47.00%	916	52.89%	2	0.12%	-102	-5.89%	1,732
Dane	4,171	51.88%	3,865	48.08%	3	0.04%	306	3.81%	8,039
Dodge	2,538	35.68%	4,575	64.32%	0	0.00%	-2,037	-28.64%	7,113
Door	578	77.17%	166	22.16%	5	0.67%	412	55.01%	749
Douglas	58	45.67%	69	54.33%	0	0.00%	-11	-8.66%	127
Dunn	1,133	68.42%	523	31.58%	0	0.00%	610	36.84%	1,656
Eau Claire	1,409	61.26%	890	38.70%	1	0.04%	519	22.57%	2,300
Fond du Lac	3,596	48.13%	3,875	51.86%	1	0.01%	-279	-3.73%	7,472
Grant	3,154	61.54%	1,971	38.46%	0	0.00%	1,183	23.08%	5,125
Green	1,757	65.29%	934	34.71%	0	0.00%	823	30.58%	2,691
Green Lake	1,299	68.05%	610	31.95%	0	0.00%	689	36.09%	1,909
Iowa	1,457	47.15%	1,632	52.82%	1	0.03%	-175	-5.66%	3,090
Jackson	668	64.98%	356	34.63%	4	0.39%	312	30.35%	1,028
Jefferson	2,225	43.66%	2,867	56.26%	4	0.08%	-642	-12.60%	5,096
Juneau	1,080	56.54%	829	43.40%	1	0.05%	251	13.14%	1,910
Kenosha	1,051	53.84%	901	46.16%	0	0.00%	150	7.68%	1,952
Kewaunee	361	35.05%	669	64.95%	0	0.00%	-308	-29.90%	1,030
La Crosse	1,798	56.67%	1,374	43.30%	1	0.03%	424	13.36%	3,173
Lafayette	1,616	50.06%	1,612	49.94%	0	0.00%	4	0.12%	3,228
Manitowoc	1,452	44.09%	1,833	55.66%	8	0.24%	-381	-11.57%	3,293
Marathon	218	21.80%	780	78.00%	2	0.20%	-562	-56.20%	1,000
Marquette	532	35.40%	971	64.60%	0	0.00%	-439	-29.21%	1,503
Milwaukee	3,690	39.58%	5,631	60.41%	1	0.01%	-1,941	-20.82%	9,322
Monroe	1,209	56.95%	914	43.05%	0	0.00%	295	13.90%	2,123
Oconto	662	68.11%	310	31.89%	0	0.00%	352	36.21%	972
Outagamie	1,219	41.11%	1,746	58.89%	0	0.00%	-527	-17.77%	2,965
Ozaukee	295	15.75%	1,574	84.04%	4	0.21%	-1,279	-68.29%	1,873
Pepin	577	70.88%	237	29.12%	0	0.00%	340	41.77%	814
Pierce	1,228	69.61%	534	30.27%	2	0.11%	694	39.34%	1,764
Polk	561	75.50%	182	24.50%	0	0.00%	379	51.01%	743
Portage	899	62.69%	535	37.31%	0	0.00%	364	25.38%	1,434
Racine	2,073	55.55%	1,659	44.45%	0	0.00%	414	11.09%	3,732
Richland	1,401	58.11%	1,009	41.85%	1	0.04%	392	16.26%	2,411
Rock	3,661	70.88%	1,504	29.12%	0	0.00%	2,157	41.76%	5,165
Sauk	1,832	67.28%	891	32.72%	0	0.00%	941	34.56%	2,723
Shawano	191	42.35%	259	57.43%	1	0.22%	-68	-15.08%	451
Sheboygan	1,927	49.75%	1,943	50.17%	3	0.08%	-16	-0.41%	3,873
St. Croix	1,181	53.76%	1,015	46.20%	1	0.05%	166	7.56%	2,197
Trempealeau	988	77.01%	294	22.92%	1	0.08%	694	54.09%	1,283
Vernon	1,686	80.21%	416	19.79%	0	0.00%	1,270	60.42%	2,102
Walworth	2,908	69.59%	1,270	30.39%	1	0.02%	1,638	39.20%	4,179
Washington	666	21.90%	2,371	77.97%	4	0.13%	-1,705	-56.07%	3,041
Waukesha	2,413	48.82%	2,529	51.16%	1	0.02%	-116	-2.35%	4,943
Waupaca	1,575	65.46%	831	34.54%	0	0.00%	744	30.92%	2,406
Waushara	1,500	81.34%	344	18.66%	0	0.00%	1,156	62.69%	1,844
Winnebago	3,005	59.74%	2,019	40.14%	6	0.12%	986	19.60%	5,030
Wood	340	50.90%	328	49.10%	0	0.00%	12	1.80%	668
Total	78,301	53.17%	68,910 (Note: The county figures add up to 68,920)	46.79%	63	0.04%	9,391	6.38%	147,274

==== Counties that flipped from Democratic to Republican ====
- Ashland
- Lafayette

==== Counties that flipped from Republican to Democratic ====
- Iowa
- Shawano
- Sheboygan
