= Aaron S. French =

American businessman (1823–1902)

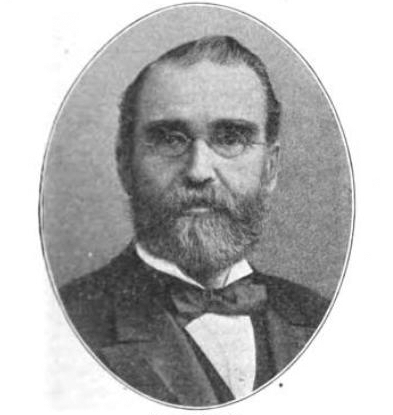
- Portrait of Aaron French
- Born: Aaron Samuel French; March 23, 1823; Wadsworth, Ohio, US
- Died: March 24, 1902 (aged 79); Pittsburgh, Pennsylvania, US
- Resting place: Allegheny Cemetery, Pittsburgh
- Occupation: industrialist

Aaron Samuel French (March 23, 1823 – March 24, 1902) was an American industrialist and philanthropist. French left school at an early age, and the first decades of his life were characterized by working a variety of jobs and recovering from prolonged illness. After co-founding a successful vehicular spring company, French gained prominence as a businessman and philanthropist in Pittsburgh during the second half of the 19th century.

== Early life ==
Aaron French was born in 1823 in Wadsworth, Ohio to Philo French and Mary (McIntyre) French. He dropped out of school at age 12 to work as a farm laborer, later apprenticing as a blacksmith and working as an agent of the American Fur Company, among other jobs. In 1843, French married Euphrasia Terrill of Liverpool, Ohio, and they had five children, of whom three survived. Euphrasia died in 1870.

In 1844, at age 20, French enrolled at the Archie McGregor Academy in Wadsworth for an additional year of schooling. Following this, he worked as a wagon maker in Illinois, but fell ill and spent four years recuperating in Ohio. Once recovered, French found work in blacksmithing for several railroad companies, eventually rising to the position of superintendent of blacksmiths and master mechanic for the now-defunct Racine & Mississippi Railroad in Racine County, Wisconsin. When the American Civil War broke out, French volunteered but was rejected for health reasons. Instead, he was elected sheriff of Racine County and served from 1862 to 1864.

== Business career ==
While finishing his term as sheriff, French partnered with Calvin Wells to establish the A. French Spring Company in Pittsburgh, which manufactured vehicular springs. The company began with just 10 employees in a small rented building near Union Depot, and French hired his son, Philo Nelson French, to work with them. Wells stepped down in 1884, and in 1887, Philo French was appointed general superintendent. At this time, the company boasted around 450 employees and a facility spanning two city blocks, by some accounts the largest of its kind in the world. As French's business expanded, he grew to become one of Pittsburgh's most prominent citizens, gaining membership to elite organizations such as the Duquesne Club, the Pittsburgh Chamber of Commerce, the South Fork Fishing and Hunting Club, and the Knights Templar. French also remarried, to Caroline B. Skeer of Chicago, and they had one child, Mary Adelaide, who died at age 18.

== Philanthropy ==
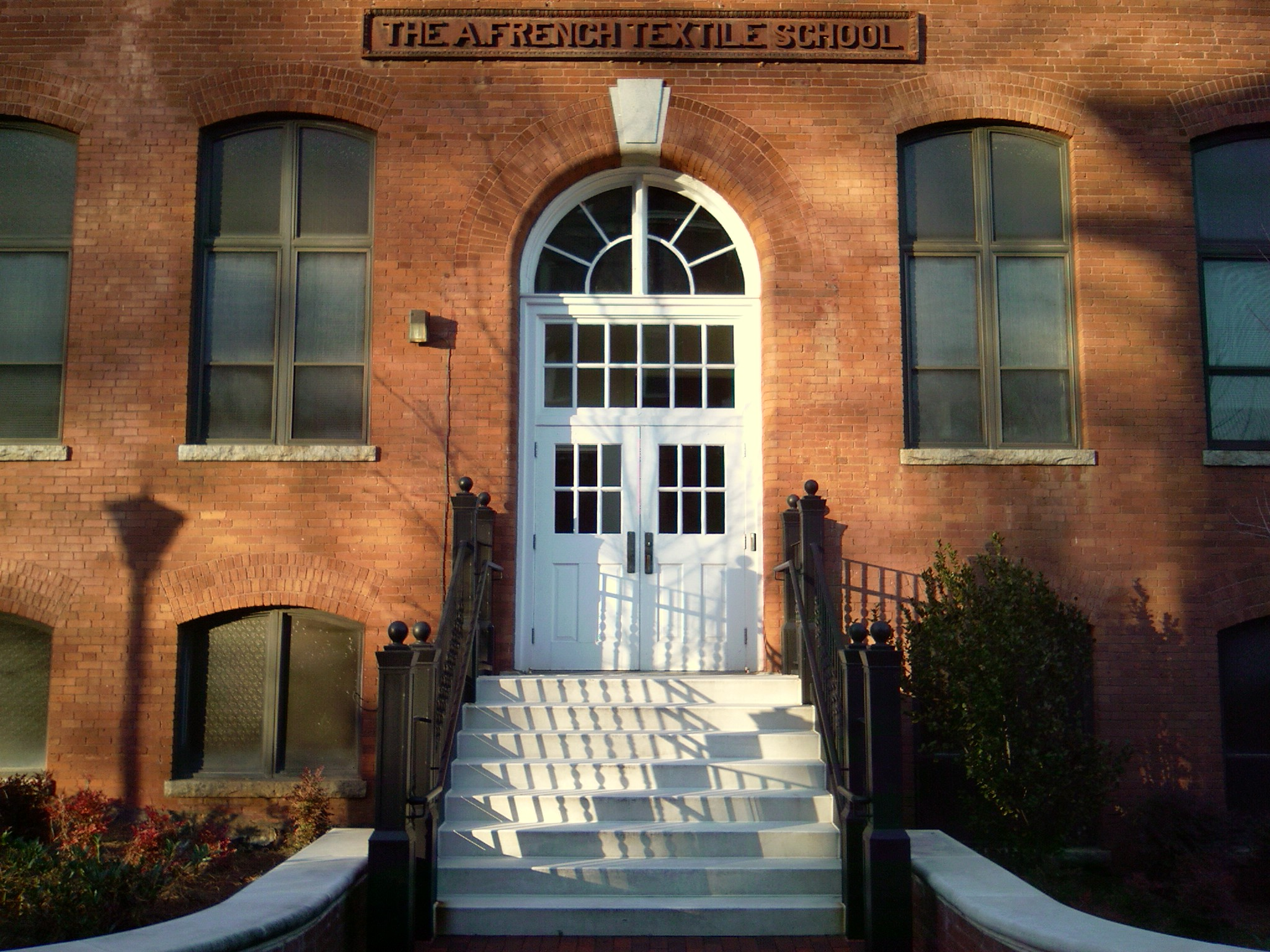
Facade of the A. French Building at Georgia Tech

French's business success also provided the funds and time to pursue philanthropy. He played a large part in the establishment of Georgia Tech's textile engineering department, which opened in February 1899, and was the young school's fourth department. French had met Lyman Hall, then president of the school, at a North Carolina summer resort, and Hall had convinced him of the need for a textile school in the South. French agreed to donate $2,500 unconditionally and an additional $3,000 if the government would match it; Hall convinced the state legislature to allocate $10,000. In recognition of this philanthropy, both the new school and the building that housed it bear French's name. The building still stands in what is now the Georgia Institute of Technology Historic District, and the textile school was expanded into Georgia Tech's School of Polymer, Textile & Fiber Engineering.

== Death ==
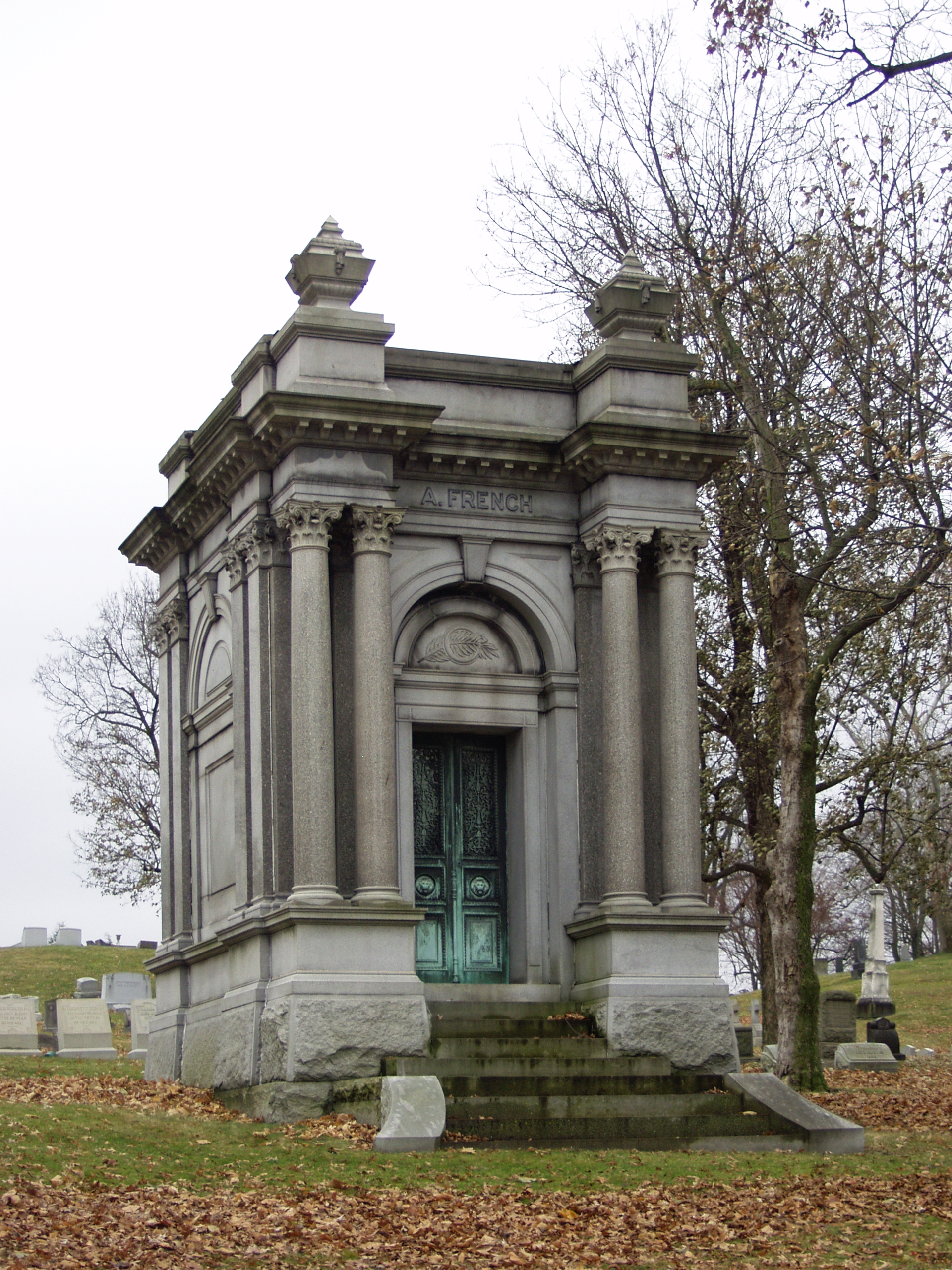

French died in 1902, a day after his 79th birthday, in his Pittsburgh home. He was interred in a large polished-granite mausoleum in Allegheny Cemetery, unique in that cemetery for its Roman triumphal arch.
