= George C. Northrop =

19th century American politician

Member of the Wisconsin State Assembly from the Racine 1st district
- In office January 4, 1864 – January 2, 1865
- Preceded by: Horatio T. Taylor
- Succeeded by: John Vaughan

13th & 15th Mayor of Racine, Wisconsin
- In office April 1863 – April 1864
- Preceded by: Alvin Raymond
- Succeeded by: Thomas Falvey
- In office April 1861 – April 1862
- Preceded by: Jerome I. Case
- Succeeded by: Alvin Raymond

Personal details
- Born: April 1, 1819 Galway, New York, U.S.
- Died: July 13, 1874 (aged 55) Racine, Wisconsin, U.S.
- Cause of death: Liver disease
- Resting place: Mound Cemetery, Racine
- Spouses: Sarah J. Wortser (died 1854); Mary C. Wortser (died 1871)
- Children: with Sarah Wortser; Henry Wortser Northrop^{(died 1839)}; George Grant Northrop^{(died 1852)}; George Wortser Northrop^{(died 1855)}; with Mary Wortser; Infant son^{(died 1859)}; Sarah (Banks)^{(b. 1863; died 1939)}
- Profession: Lawyer

George Chester Northrop (April 1, 1819 – July 13, 1874) was an American lawyer, banker, and Wisconsin pioneer. He was an early mayor of Racine, Wisconsin, and established the first bank in Racine. He also represented the city in the Wisconsin State Assembly in 1864. His last name is sometimes spelled Northrup.

== Biography ==
George C. Northrop was born April 1, 1819, in Galway, New York. He received a liberal academic education and then went on to study law at Ballston Spa. He was admitted to the bar and opened a law office in Medina, New York. After a period of poor health, he moved west to Racine, Wisconsin, in 1849, and was admitted to the Wisconsin bar.

In 1853, he formed a partnership with Horatio B. Munroe, Reuben M. Norton, and Henry S. Durand to organize the Racine County Bank, the first bank in Racine. Northrop worked for several years as the first cashier and manager of the bank, which was later converted to the First National Bank of Racine. During these years, he also became one of the founding shareholders and directors of the Racine Gas-Light Company. In 1859, Northrop also became an investor in a new bank formed by his younger brother, Byron Booth Northrop, known as the "Bank of B. B. Northrop & Co."

He was elected mayor of Racine with large majorities in 1861 and 1863. During the American Civil War, he gave notable speeches in support of the Union cause and advocated for emancipation. He was elected to the Wisconsin State Assembly in 1863, running on the National Union Party ticket, and was nearly elected speaker for the 17th Wisconsin Legislature.

He suffered poor health for most of his life and died of jaundice on July 15, 1874.

== Personal life and family ==
George C. Northrop was the fourth of six children born to Dr. Booth Northrop and his wife Huldah (née Shepard). His younger brother, Byron Booth Northrop, also came to Racine and was a prominent citizen in the early years of the city. His older brother, Henry H. Northrop, was a Presbyterian minister in Michigan and served as a chaplain with the 13th Michigan Infantry Regiment in the Civil War. The Northrops were descendants of Joseph Northrop and his wife Mary (née Norton), English colonists who settled in New Haven, Connecticut Colony, in 1638. Stiles Northrop, who also served in the Wisconsin State Assembly in the 1860s, was a distant cousin.

George C. Northrop married twice. His first wife was Sarah Wortser; they had three children who all died in infancy, before her death in 1854. He then married Mary Wortser, the sister of his first wife. They had another son who died in infancy, then had a daughter, Sarah, who survived them. Sarah married William Rochester Banks of Lamar, Missouri, and had at least two children.

Wisconsin State Assembly
Preceded by Horatio T. Taylor	Member of the Wisconsin State Assembly from the Racine 1st district January 4, 1864 – January 2, 1865	Succeeded by John Vaughan
Political offices
Preceded by Jerome I. Case	Mayor of Racine, Wisconsin; April 1861 – April 1862	Succeeded by Alvin Raymond
Preceded by Alvin Raymond	Mayor of Racine, Wisconsin; April 1863 – April 1864	Succeeded by Thomas Falvey
