= Lyman Hall (academic) =

American academic administrator

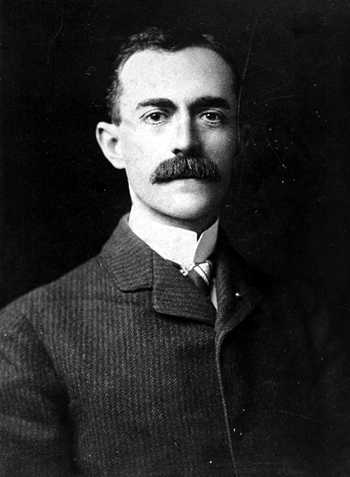
- Lyman Hall circa 1896
- Born: February 18, 1859; Americus, Georgia
- Died: August 16, 1905 (aged 46); New York
- Education: Mercer University; West Point
- Known for: President of Georgia Tech
- Scientific career
- Fields: Mathematics

Lyman Hall (February 18, 1859 – August 16, 1905) was a professor and president of the Georgia School of Technology (now called the Georgia Institute of Technology, commonly referred to as Georgia Tech). Hall's administration introduced degrees in electrical engineering and civil engineering in December 1896, textile engineering in February 1899, and engineering chemistry in January 1901.

Hall died in 1905, reportedly due to the stress of fundraising for a new chemistry building which now bears his name.

== Early life ==
Born in 1859 in Americus, Georgia, he attended Mercer University in Penfield, Georgia. He was admitted to the United States Military Academy in 1877, and graduated in 1881. Due to a physical disability, he was unable to have a military career; instead, he taught mathematics at the Georgia Military Academy in Kirkwood, Georgia, for two years and subsequently at the South Carolina Military Academy in Charleston, South Carolina (now known as "The Citadel") from 1883 to 1886. He was then a professor at the Moreland Park Military Academy before Georgia Tech recruited him.

== Career ==
In 1888, Captain Lyman Hall was appointed Georgia Tech's first mathematics professor (and consequently head of the school's mathematics department). He had a solid background in engineering due to his time at West Point and often incorporated surveying and other engineering applications into his coursework. He had an energetic personality and quickly assumed a leadership position among the faculty. At the first faculty meeting on October 5, 1888, he was elected secretary. On June 25, 1895, Hall was invited to speak to Georgia Tech's board about the school's needs. While there were no recorded minutes, subsequent board actions suggest that he recommended the construction of on-campus dormitories to reduce disciplinary problems, and a more proactive recruitment of students.

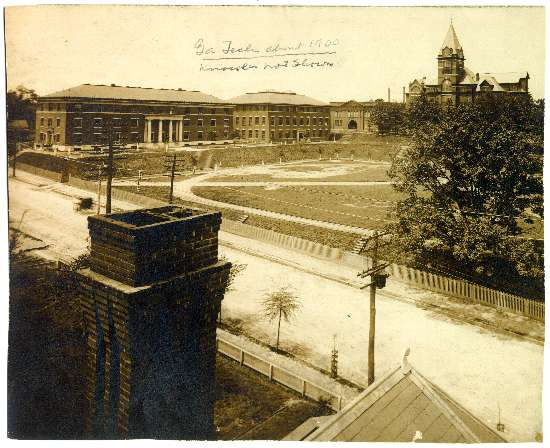
Georgia Tech around 1900, with Tech Tower in the background

Previous president Isaac S. Hopkins tendered his resignation in May 1895 because he had been elected president of the First Methodist Church of Atlanta and he could not do "justice to both to the school and the church". While several successors were considered, Samuel M. Inman proposed that the decision be postponed. Georgia Tech's trustees correspondingly elected Hall as the chairman of the faculty (acting president) From January 1, 1896, to July 1, 1896. On June 24, the trustees elected him the institute's second president.

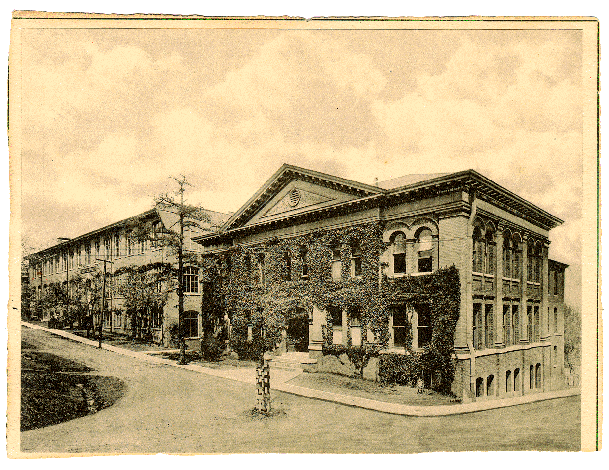
The Lyman Hall Laboratory of Chemistry in 1913

In February 1899, Georgia Tech opened the first textile engineering school in the Southern United States, with $10,000 from the Georgia General Assembly, $20,000 of donated machinery, and $13,500 from supporters. The school was named the A. French Textile School, after its chief donor and supporter, Aaron S. French.

Hall's other goals included enlarging Tech and attracting more students, so he expanded the school's offerings beyond mechanical engineering; the new degrees introduced during Hall's administration included electrical engineering and civil engineering in December 1896, textile engineering in February 1899, and engineering chemistry in January 1901. Hall also became infamous as a disciplinarian, even suspending the entire senior class of 1901 for returning from Christmas vacation a day late.

Hall died on August 16, 1905, during a vacation at a New York health resort. His death while still in office was attributed to stress from his strenuous fund raising activities (this time, for a new Chemistry building). Later that year, the school's trustees named the new chemistry building the "Lyman Hall Laboratory of Chemistry" in his honor.

== Lyman Hall building ==
The Lyman Hall Laboratory of Chemistry at Georgia Tech was erected in 1905. It now houses the Bursar's Office after being completely gutted in 1989, but the quote from geologist Sir Archibald Geikie's 1905 published work remains on the front of the building: "In the first place I would put accuracy."

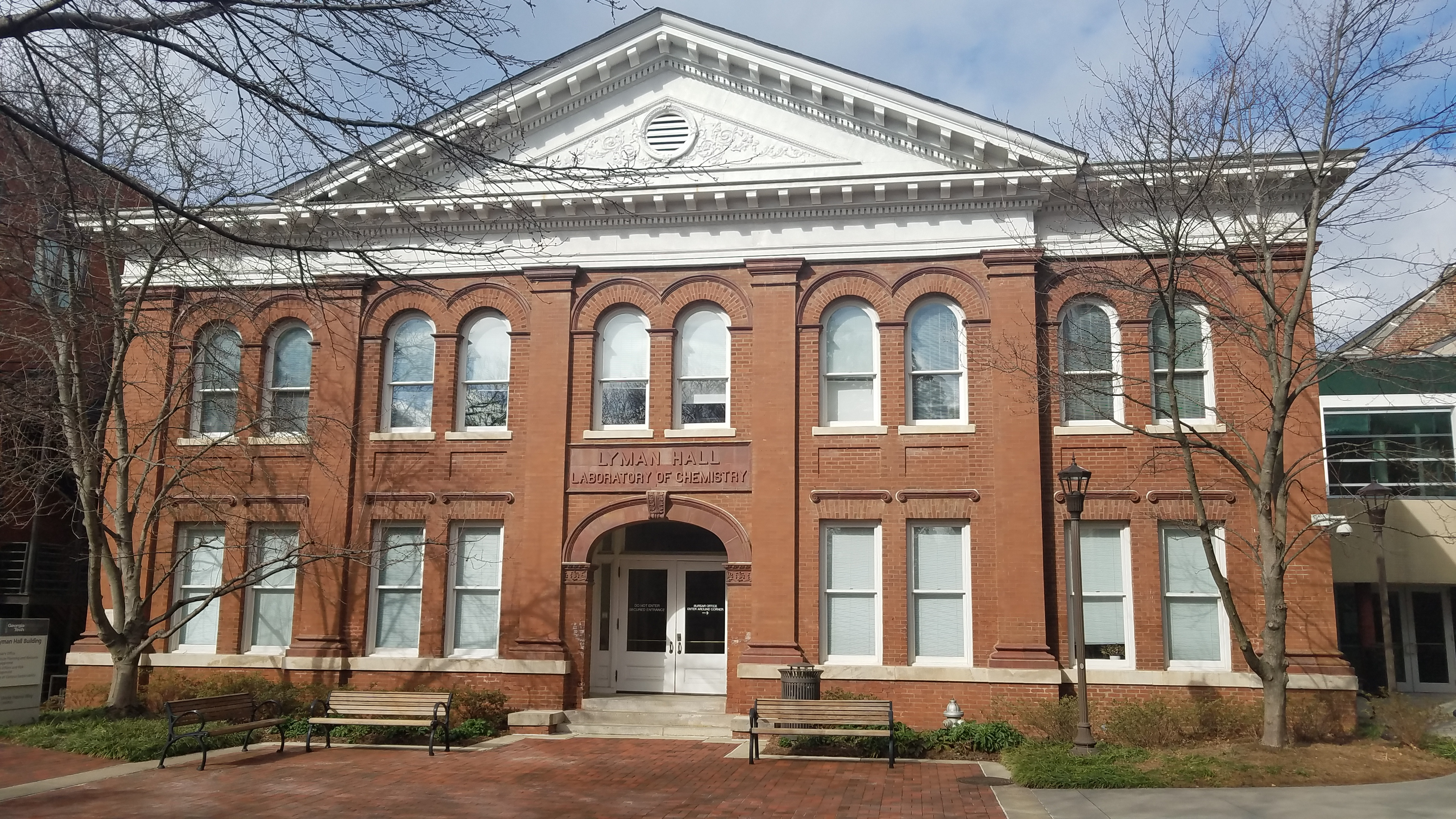
Lyman Hall Building

The 1903 to 1906 school announcements describe the architecture of the building in great detail:

The Lyman Hall Laboratory of Chemistry, which is in the shape of a T, is of brick with limestone trimmings, and is two stories in height, with a full basement. Each floor has an approximate area of 5,600 square feet. The lecture-rooms, stock-rooms, library, offices, gas analysis laboratory, photographic and spectroscopic rooms occupy the front, and the laboratories the rear wing. Especial care has been given to lighting and ventilation, the laboratories being lighted on three sides. For the removal of noxious gases, they are amply provided with hoods, each of which has a separate flue leading to a tight wooden fume-box loaced just under the roof. This box communicates with the outer air, and can be provided with forced draught if necessary. The Chemical and Physical laboratories have been fitted up with reference to practical work, and such addition will be made from time to time as may be required for experimental research. The apparatus and appliances are of the newest and best forms, and will be increased as occasion may demand.

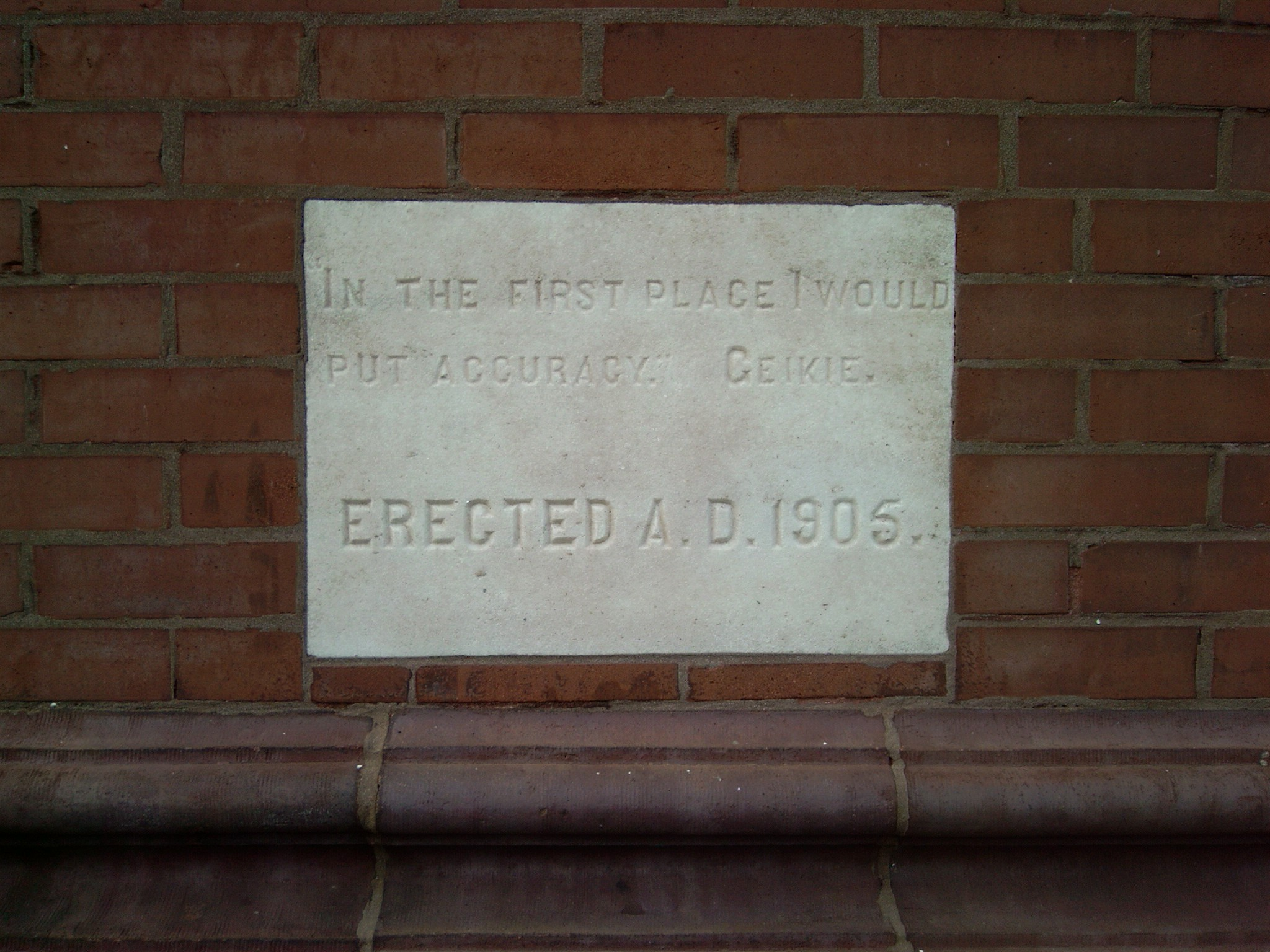
The building's cornerstone, with the inscription "In the first place I would put accuracy."

The building is located within the Georgia Institute of Technology Historic District, and it is included in the 12-building area listed on the National Register of Historic Places.

== See also ==
- History of Georgia Tech
