= Georgia Institute of Technology Historic District =

Historic district in Georgia, United States

- U.S. National Register of Historic Places
- U.S. Historic district
- Location within Atlanta Location within Georgia Location within the United States
- Location: 225 North Avenue, Atlanta, Georgia, USA
- Coordinates: 33°46′21″N 84°23′40″W
- Area: 9 acres (0.036 km^{2}), 12 buildings
- Built: 1888
- Architect: Multiple
- Architectural style: Beaux Arts, Colonial Revival, Romanesque
- NRHP reference No.: 78000983
- Added to NRHP: October 25, 1978

The Historic District of the Georgia Institute of Technology, also known as the Old Campus of Georgia Tech or the Hill District, is significant in the areas of architecture, education, engineering and science, as well as landscape architecture. The area is a Registered Historic Place and part of the central campus of Georgia Tech. Located in Midtown Atlanta, Georgia, United States, it is roughly bounded by North Avenue on the south, Bobby Dodd Stadium on the east, Bobby Dodd Way on the north and Cherry Street on the west.

== Environs ==
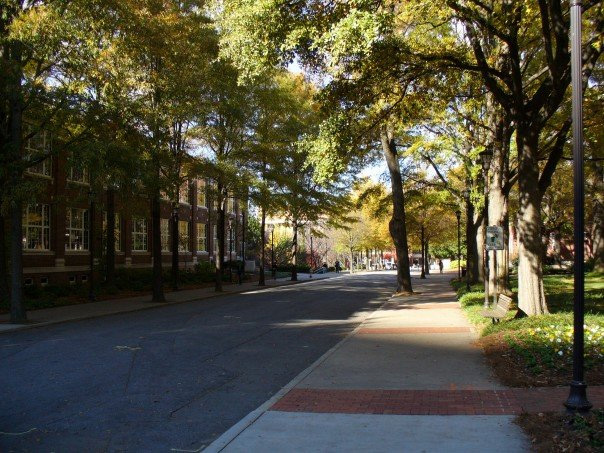
Cherry Street, closed to vehicle traffic, serves as a footpath along the Western border of the Historic District of Georgia Tech.

The Georgia Institute of Technology Historic District is situated on and around the crest of "The Hill," the highest elevation of the school's original nine-acre campus. Comprising 12 buildings, the Old Campus is a landscaped cluster of mixed-period classroom, dormitory and administrative brick buildings. Buildings of the Old Campus include the Carnegie Building, which was the campus library until 1953; the Georgia Tech President's Office is now located there. Lyman Hall Laboratory, named after Lyman Hall, one of Georgia Tech's earlier presidents, was the school's first Chemistry Building. The YMCA Building, funded by John D. Rockefeller in 1910, now houses the Georgia Tech Alumni Association Offices. The random placement of these buildings around the centrally positioned Administration Building ("Tech Tower") has created unique urban spaces. Hundred-year-old trees shade the red brick buildings and enhance the sense of special enclosure.

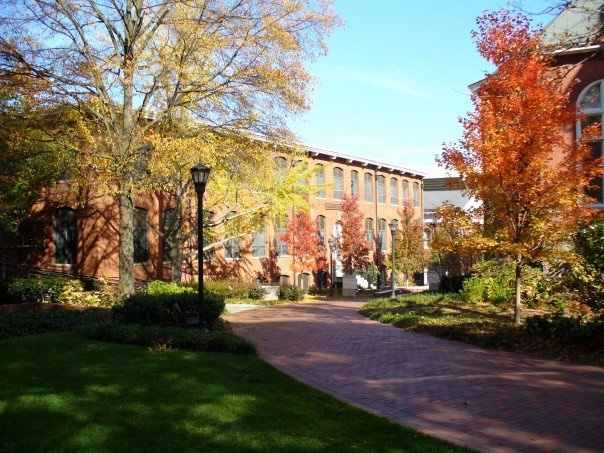
Uncle Heinie Way seen from West of Tech Tower.

A brick roadway, Uncle Heinie Way, wraps around the Administration Building and provides both service and vehicular access to the buildings in this portion of the Campus. A new plaza, Harrison Square, which both a hard surface of brick and concrete as well as an open green space, was created in 1968 after the demolition of the Old Shop, the successor of the original (a near-twin to the adjacent Administration building which burned down shortly after its completion).

== Style, form, planning ==
The Old Campus of Georgia Tech is significant for more than just the design of the buildings of which it is comprised. As is evident in the placement of the buildings, little thought was actually given to the future expansion of the then young technological school. Instead, the site planning was carried out in such a manner as to meet the immediate and pressing needs of the school. This practical approach has created the significant quality of space. The harmony found within the Old Campus is attributed to the fact that almost all of the buildings were built within a short span of time—from 1885 to 1923. Though all exhibit a consistent approach in design and construction, none include a repetition of style or form.

== National Register of Historic Places ==
In 1978, the area was added to the National Register of Historic Places. Near the entrance to Tech Tower, a historical marker maintained by the Georgia Historical Society commemorates this listing as well as the early history of the Georgia Tech campus.

== The twelve buildings ==
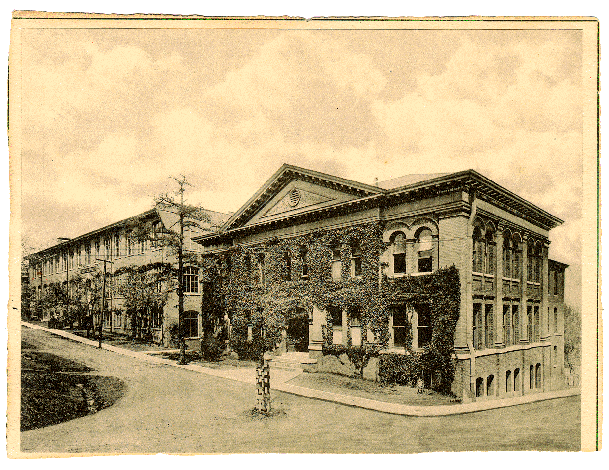
The Lyman Hall Laboratory of Chemistry

- Lettie Pate Whitehead Evans Administration Building (1888)
- Clarence Knowles Dormitory (1897–1992)
- Aaron S. French Building (1898)
- Electrical (Engineering) Building (1901), renamed the Domenico Pietro Savant Building
- Janie Austell Swann Dormitories (1901)
- Lyman Hall Laboratory of Chemistry (1905)
- Andrew Carnegie Library Building (1907)
- Joseph Brown Whitehead Memorial Hospital (1911), renamed the Lloyd W. Chapin Building in 1987
- John Davison Rockefeller YMCA Building (1912), renamed the Lawrence W. "Chip" Robert, Jr. Alumni/Faculty House in 1979
- David Melville Smith Building (1923)
- William Henry Emerson Building (1925)
- John Saylor Coon Building (five units completed between 1911–1938)

The Old Shop could be considered a "thirteenth building." Erected in 1888, it was destroyed by a fire in 1892 and a replacement was built in the same year. The second shop building was demolished in 1968.

== See also ==
- History of Georgia Tech
- Georgia Tech main campus

== Bibliography ==
- "Georgia Institute of Technology Historic District". National Park Service. Archived from the original on February 26, 2003.
- "Georgia Institute of Technology". Marietta Street Artery Association. Archived from the original on January 2, 2007.
- "A Thousand Wheels are set in Motion: The Building of Georgia Tech at the Turn of the 20th Century, 1888-1908". Georgia Tech Library and Information Center.
- Atlanta, Georgia, a National Park Service Discover Our Shared Heritage Travel Itinerary
