= Charles Herrick =

American politician (1814–1886)

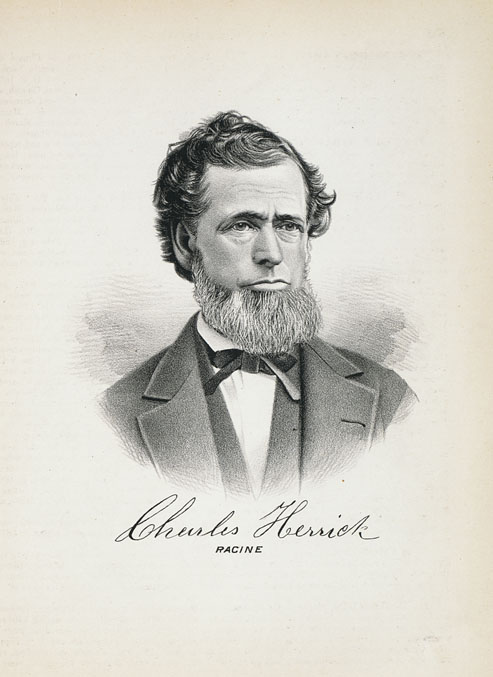
- 1879 portrait

Member of the Wisconsin Senate from the 5th district
- In office January 15, 1874 – January 13, 1875
- Preceded by: Robert Hall Baker
- Succeeded by: Robert Hall Baker

Member of the Mount Pleasant Town Board
- In office 1872–1873
- In office 1870–1871

Member of the Racine City Council
- In office 1850–1851

Member of the Racine Village Board
- In office 1845–1846

Personal details
- Born: September 22, 1814 Westford, Massachusetts, U.S.
- Died: November 14, 1886 (aged 72) Racine, Wisconsin
- Resting place: Mound Cemetery, Racine
- Party: Liberal Reform (1874); Liberal Republican (1873)
- Spouse: Ann (Ball) Herrick
- Children: 3
- Occupation: farmer, banker

Charles Herrick (September 22, 1814 – November 14, 1886) was an American farmer and banker who represented Racine County in the Wisconsin State Senate during the 1874 session. He was elected as a Liberal Republican.

== Background ==
Herrick was born in Westford, Massachusetts on September 22, 1814. He received both common school and academic education. He left his home town in 1836, and spent some time logging on the Muskegon and White Rivers of Michigan. In 1841, he moved to the Wisconsin Territory, settling first in Racine, where he went into the produce business and sold cattle. On December 14, 1846, he married Ann Ball, a native of Virgil, New York; the couple had three sons. In 1849, he went into the business of manufacturing fanning mills, a business he continued until 1854.

He was a Trustee in 1845 of the then-Village of Racine, then in 1850 was an alderman of the City of Racine (the Village of Racine incorporated as a city in 1848). When the city created a school board, he was among those elected to it. When, in 1855, a Racine Gas-light and Coke Company was organized, he was among those elected to its initial board of directors.

In 1857 he moved to the neighboring town of Mount Pleasant. He was a supervisor of the town in 1870 and 1872.

== State Senate ==
Herrick was elected in an 1873 special election to fill a vacancy created by the resignation of incumbent Robert Hall Baker, a Republican, who was running for lieutenant governor. Herrick won 2,423 votes, to 1,519 votes for former state senator and State Representative Philo Belden, the regular Republican candidate.

In 1874, Baker (who had lost his race for Lieutenant Governor) ran for his old seat, and beat Herrick by 2,706 votes to Herrick's 2,130 as the candidate of the Liberal Reform Party, a short-lived coalition of Democrats, Reform and Liberal Republicans, and Grangers formed in 1873 which secured the election of a Governor of Wisconsin and elected a number of state legislators.

== Death ==
He died of heart failure at his home in Racine on November 14, 1886.

== Electoral history ==
Wisconsin Senate, 5th District Election, 1873
Party	Candidate	Votes	%	±%
General Election, November 4, 1873
Liberal Republican	Charles Herrick	2,423	61.47%	
Republican	Philo Belden	1,519	38.53%	
Total votes		'3,942'	'100.0%'	
Liberal Republican gain from Republican				

Wisconsin Senate, 5th District Election, 1874
Party	Candidate	Votes	%	±%
General Election, November 3, 1874
Republican	Robert Hall Baker	2,706	55.96%	+17.42%
Liberal Republican	Charles Herrick (incumbent)	2,130	44.04%	−17.42%
Total votes		'4,836'	'100.0%'	+22.68%
Republican gain from Liberal Republican				
