= James R. Doolittle =

American politician

The Honorable James R. Doolittle
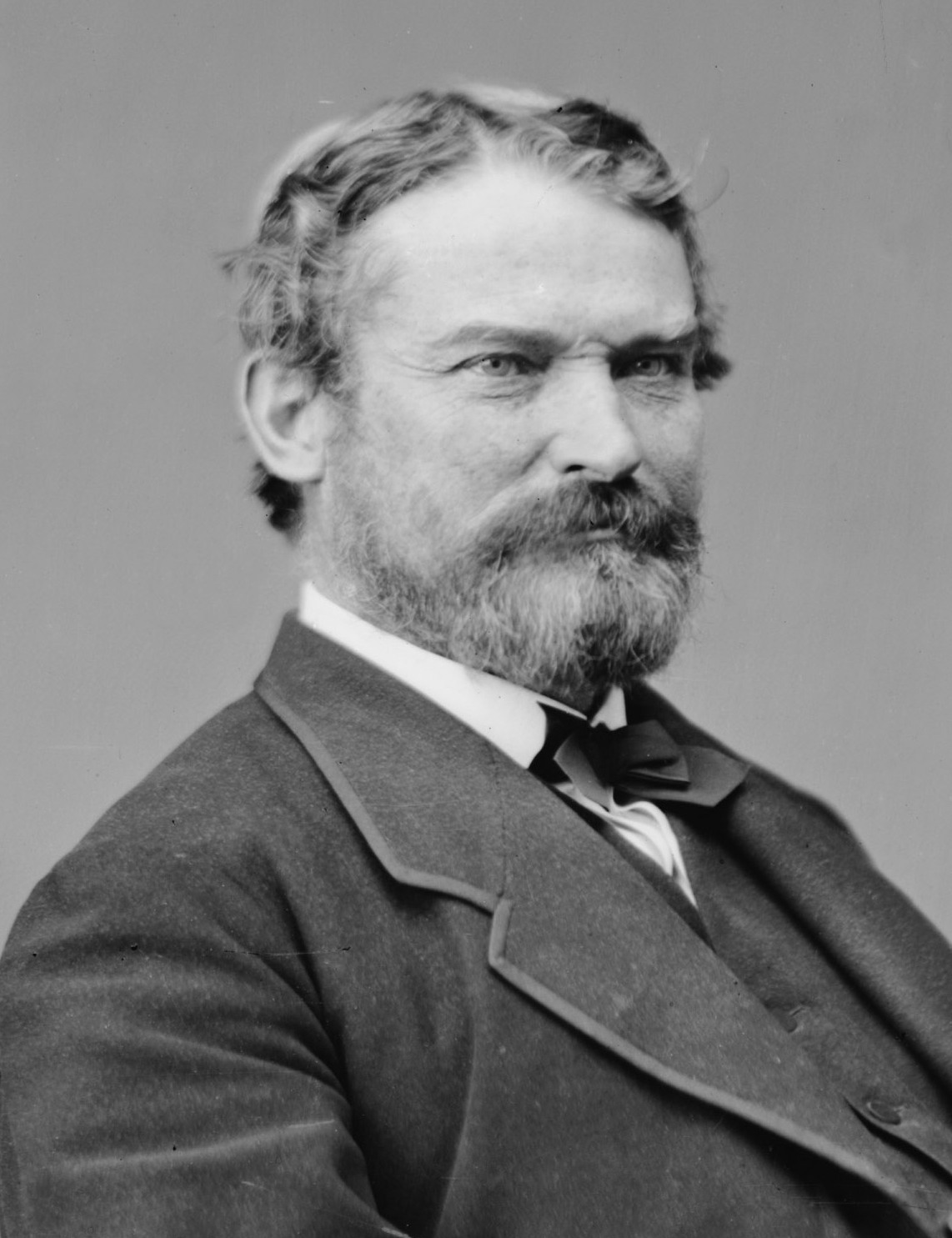
- Doolittle c. 1860–1875

Chairman of the Senate Indian Affairs Committee
- In office March 4, 1861 – March 4, 1867
- Preceded by: William K. Sebastian
- Succeeded by: John B. Henderson

United States Senator from Wisconsin
- In office March 4, 1857 – March 3, 1869
- Preceded by: Henry Dodge
- Succeeded by: Matthew H. Carpenter

Chairman of the Democratic Congressional Campaign Committee
- In office 1868

Wisconsin Circuit Court Judge for the 1st Circuit
- In office October 1853 – March 1856
- Preceded by: Wyman Spooner
- Succeeded by: Charles Minton Baker

Personal details
- Born: January 3, 1815 Hampton, New York, U.S.
- Died: July 27, 1897 (aged 82) Providence, Rhode Island, U.S.
- Resting place: Mound Cemetery, Racine, Wisconsin
- Party: Democratic (after 1871); Republican (1854–1871); Democratic (before 1854)
- Spouse: Mary Lovina Cutting (m. 1837; died 1879)
- Children: 6
- Education: Hobart College
- Profession: Politician, lawyer

James Rood Doolittle Sr. (January 3, 1815 – July 27, 1897) was an American lawyer, politician, and Wisconsin pioneer. He represented Wisconsin for 12 years as a United States senator, from March 4, 1857, to March 4, 1869. During his years in the Senate, he was a Republican and a strong supporter of Abraham Lincoln's administration during the American Civil War. He was chairman of the Senate Indian Affairs Committee from 1861 to 1867. Later in life he became a member of the Democratic Party and made an unsuccessful run for governor of Wisconsin.

== Early life ==
Born in Hampton, New York, Doolittle was the son of Reuben Doolittle and Sarah Rood. He attended Middlebury Academy in Wyoming, New York, and, in 1834, he graduated from Hobart College in Geneva, New York. He subsequently studied law and was admitted to the New York bar association in 1837.

== Early career ==
He then established a law practice in Rochester. Doolittle moved to Warsaw, New York, in 1841. From 1847 to 1850, he was the district attorney for Wyoming County. He also served for a time as a colonel in the New York State militia.

In 1851, Doolittle moved to Racine, Wisconsin, and, in 1853, was elected Wisconsin Circuit Court Judge for the 1st Circuit, defeating incumbent appointee Wyman Spooner. During his time as judge, he presided over the July 1855 case of The State of Wisconsin v. David F. Mayberry, the result of which led to the only recorded lynching in the history of Rock County, Wisconsin. Doolittle resigned from the court in March 1856.

== Senator ==
Until the 1850 repeal of the Missouri Compromise, Doolittle was a Democrat. He left the party and was elected and then elected to the Senate as a Republican in 1857 and 1863, respectively. He was a delegate to the Peace Conference of 1861 in Washington, D.C.

While senator, Doolittle was the Chairman of the Committee on Indian Affairs. Along with his colleague, Jacob Collamer of Vermont, Doolittle represented the minority view for the Mason Report (June 1860), which was prepared by the Senate committee to investigate John Brown's raid on Harper's Ferry in October 1859. He also proposed a constitutional amendment to ban secession.

During the Civil War, Doolittle supported many of Lincoln's policies, and he was active in representing Wisconsin's interests on Capitol Hill. During the summer recess of 1865, he visited the Natives west of the Mississippi River as chairman of the Joint Special Committee on Conditions of Indian Tribes, which was charged with an inquiry into the condition of the Native tribes and their treatment by the U.S. civil and military authorities. In the West, the committee split into subcommittees, which considered different regions with Doolittle participating in the inquiry into Native affairs in Kansas, the Indian Territory, and Colorado.

The report of the committee, The Condition of the Tribes, was issued on January 26, 1867. Doolittle was accused by The New York Times in 1872, while he was under consideration for appointment as Secretary of the Interior in the projected "reform cabinet" by Democratic presidential candidate Horace Greeley, of suppressing the report, as it contained information exposing the Native ring of fraudulent suppliers of goods to the Native tribes under treaty obligations. The Times alleged that the report was printed only after the Cincinnati Gazette obtained a copy of it.

Doolittle took a prominent part in the debate on the various war and reconstruction measures, upholding the federal government but always insisting that the seceding states had never ceased to be a part of the Union. He strongly opposed the Fifteenth Amendment and believed that each state should determine questions of suffrage for itself. He was also one of 11 senators, and one of three Republican senators, to vote against the Fourteenth Amendment to the United States Constitution.

== Later life ==
After he left the Senate, he ran for Governor of Wisconsin in 1871 as a Democrat. After he lost, he retired from politics.

Doolittle returned to the Midwest and became a lawyer in Chicago, Illinois, while he maintained his residence in Racine. He served for a year as the acting president of the Old University of Chicago, and he spent many years on its staff as a professor in the law school as well as serving on the Board of Trustees.

He was president of the National Union Convention of 1866 in Philadelphia and also of the 1872 Democratic National Convention in Baltimore, which adopted the nomination of Horace Greeley. He died of Bright's disease in Edgewood, Rhode Island in 1897, and was interred in Mound Cemetery in Racine, Wisconsin.

== Personal life and family ==
James R. Doolittle married Mary Lovina Cutting on July 27, 1837. They had four sons and two daughters, and were married for 42 years before her death in 1879.

Their son James Jr. became a prominent lawyer in Chicago, and served five years on the Chicago Board of Education.

== Sources ==
- United States Congress. "James R. Doolittle (id: D000428)". Biographical Directory of the United States Congress. Retrieved on 2009-04-28
- This article incorporates text from a publication now in the public domain: Wilson, J. G.; Fiske, J., eds. (1900). "Doolittle, James Rood" . Appletons' Cyclopædia of American Biography. New York: D. Appleton.

Party political offices
Preceded by Charles D. Robinson	Democratic nominee for Governor of Wisconsin; 1871	Succeeded by William Robert Taylor
U.S. Senate
Preceded by Henry Dodge	U.S. senator (Class 1) from Wisconsin; 1857 – 1869; Served alongside: Charles Durkee and Timothy O. Howe	Succeeded by Matthew H. Carpenter
Preceded by William K. Sebastian	Chairman of the Senate Indian Affairs Committee; 1861–1867	Succeeded by John B. Henderson
Legal offices
Preceded by Wyman Spooner	Wisconsin Circuit Court Judge for the 1st Circuit; 1853 – 1856	Succeeded by Charles Minton Baker
