= Thomas Falvey (Wisconsin politician) =

19th century American businessman and politician

16th Mayor of Racine, Wisconsin
- In office April 1864 – April 1865
- Preceded by: George C. Northrop
- Succeeded by: John W. Hart

Member of the Wisconsin State Assembly from the Racine 1st district
- In office January 1, 1855 – January 5, 1857
- Preceded by: Charles S. Wright
- Succeeded by: Lewelyn J. Evans

Personal details
- Born: April 21, 1828 County Clare, Ireland
- Died: January 16, 1875 (aged 46) Racine, Wisconsin, U.S.
- Resting place: Calvary Catholic Cemetery, Racine, Wisconsin
- Party: Democratic
- Spouse: Sinai Jane Mather (m. 1864–1875)

Thomas Falvey (April 21, 1828 – January 16, 1875) was an Irish American businessman and Democratic politician. He was the 16th mayor of Racine, Wisconsin, and represented Racine in the Wisconsin State Assembly in 1855 and 1856.

== Biography ==
Born in Clare, County Clare, Ireland, Falvey emigrated to the United States with his mother in 1833 and settled in Little Falls, New York where he worked as a moulder. Falvey then moved to Fulton New York. In 1851, Falvey moved to Racine, Wisconsin and was in the farm implement business. In 1855 and 1856, Falvey served in the Wisconsin State Assembly and was a Democrat. Later, Falvey served as mayor of Racine, Wisconsin. Falvey died suddenly of a heart attack in Racine, Wisconsin, shortly after returning from a business trip to Kansas City.
