= Reuben M. Norton =

American businessman and mayor (1796–1884)

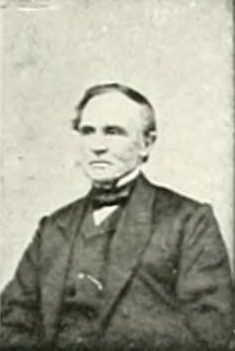
- Photo dated c. 1848

1st Mayor of Racine, Wisconsin
- In office October 6, 1848 – April 1849
- Preceded by: Position established
- Succeeded by: Henry Bryan

Personal details
- Born: September 30, 1796 Greenwich, New York, U.S.
- Died: April 24, 1884 (aged 87) Chicago, Illinois, U.S.
- Resting place: Mound Cemetery, Racine, Wisconsin
- Party: Free Soil Party (1848); Democratic (before 1848)
- Spouse: Elizabeth Perine (died 1877)
- Children: Reuben Norton (died 1862); H. L. Norton; Mrs. Augustus Gray

Reuben Moores Norton (September 30, 1796 – April 24, 1884) was an American businessman and the first mayor of Racine, Wisconsin. He was also the first president of the Racine County Bank and the first president of the Western Union Railroad Company. In historical documents, he is often referred to as R. M. Norton.

== Biography ==
Norton was born in Greenwich, in Washington County, New York, one of eleven children born to Captain Elijah Norton and his wife Rebecca (Moore) Norton. His father, Elijah, had served as a captain in the militia during the American Revolutionary War.

When he first arrived in the Wisconsin Territory, Norton was involved in the lumber industry, and was president of the Oconto Lumber Company. He located at the village of Racine in 1842, purchased a large farm, and engaged in grain trade and warehousing.

In 1843, Norton established the first meat-packing plant in Racine, assisted by his brother-in-law Alexander Mosher. The business was located on the south bank of the Root River, near the present location of the Chicago and Northwestern Railroad overpass at 9th Street. They purchased and slaughtered cattle from southeast Wisconsin and northern Illinois, then packed and shipped the meat down the river to Lake Michigan, and on to markets in New York and Boston.

In April 1848, Norton was elected as a member of the last board of trustees for the Village of Racine, before it was abolished and replaced by the new city government. After the incorporation of the city of Racine, an election was held for the first city officers. Norton was nominated by the new Free Soil Party as their candidate for Mayor. Norton was elected with 47% of the vote over Whig and Democratic candidates Matthew B. Mead and Henry Bryan.

Following his term as Mayor, Norton continued to grow in influence in the Racine business community. In 1854, Norton was one of the co-founders of the Racine County Bank, and was the first president of the company. He was also a major shareholder and a member of the board of directors of the Racine and Mississippi Railroad Company, and later became the first president of its successor company, the Western Union Railroad Company, which subsequently became a component of the Chicago, Milwaukee, St. Paul and Pacific Railroad.

In the 1860s, he ran into financial trouble and had to sell much of his property. He moved to Chicago and went into business with his son-in-law, Augustus R. Gray. His former home on Main Street was purchased by Jerome Case.

== Personal life and family ==
Norton married Elizabeth Perine, together they had at least three children. Their son, Reuben, enlisted as a private with the 20th Wisconsin Infantry Regiment in the American Civil War and died of wounds at the Battle of Prairie Grove.

Norton died at the home of his son-in-law, Augustus Gray, on April 24, 1884. He was buried at Racine's historic Mound Cemetery.

== Electoral history ==
=== Racine Mayor (1848) ===
Racine Mayoral Election, 1848
Party	Candidate	Votes	%
General Election, October 3, 1848
Free Soil	Reuben M. Norton	231	47.05%
Whig	Matthew B. Mead	170	34.62%
Democratic	Henry Bryan	90	18.33%
Plurality		61	12.42%
Total votes		491	100.0%
Free Soil win (new seat)			

Political offices
City incorporated	Mayor of Racine, Wisconsin; October 1848 – April 1849	Succeeded by Henry Bryan
