= James E. Dull =

James Dull
- Dull, c. 1967
- Born: April 18, 1928; Connellsville, Pennsylvania
- Died: March 22, 2009 (aged 80)
- Education: Slippery Rock State Teacher's College; Miami University
- Scientific career
- Workplaces: Miami University; Georgia Institute of Technology

James "Jim" Edward Dull (April 18, 1928 – March 22, 2009) was dean of students of Georgia Institute of Technology (commonly known as "Georgia Tech") from 1964 to 1991. Dull was instrumental in the peaceful integration of Georgia Tech, and he oversaw many improvements with student life during his tenure at Georgia Tech.

== Early life and education ==
Dull was born in Connellsville, Pennsylvania, to James and Anna Jean Dull. He attended Slippery Rock State Teacher's College and graduated in 1950 with a Bachelor of Science in biology and health/physical education. From 1950 to 1952, he served in the United States Army, where was stationed at Fort Dix, New Jersey and became a corporal. He then studied at Miami University in Oxford, Ohio, where he earned a Master of Science degree in higher education with certification in counseling and guidance. He met Gay Kimbro, who was then teaching in the Miami University Laboratory School, at a square dance club meeting at Miami University in 1954. They were married on June 8, 1955, in Atlanta and then returned to Miami University, where Dull continued to work with student affairs and residence hall activities.

== Georgia Tech ==
After serving five years at Miami, Dull accepted a position at Georgia Tech as assistant dean of students after meeting with Dean Griffin, who described the many opportunities for improvements needed at Georgia Tech. Dull and his wife lived in Towers Residence Hall for the next 3 years; during this time their two sons were born. Three years after arriving at Georgia Tech he was made associate dean of students. President Harrison promoted him to dean of students in 1964 after Dean Griffin retired.

Dull was responsible for all disciplinary processes and policies, and he had administrative responsibility of all student personnel services and programs outside the curriculum. Dull was also involved with many campus organizations during his tenure, such as the Ramblin' Reck Club and the Georgia Tech cheerleaders; he bought the original Ramblin' Wreck, a 1930 Ford Cabriolet. Dull improved freshman orientation and was the adviser for the student government. Dull also started and coached the Wreckettes Dancing and Drill team, and he organized a national championship-winning College Bowl team. In an extracurricular program, Dull taught students beginning ballroom dancing for 30 years.

Mrs. Dull was also involved with Georgia Tech. For example, she helped bring sororities to campus. Mr. and Mrs. Dull are both honorary alumni, and they wrote a book, "It’s For You, Thirty-One Years of Our Life On the Georgia Tech Campus." Dull served nine presidents during his career at Georgia Tech.

=== Integration ===
Dull played an important role in the successful racial integration of Georgia Tech in 1961. After riots occurred when black students enrolled at the University of Georgia in January 1961, Dull was assigned to develop a plan to accomplish integration at Georgia Tech peacefully. Implementation of Dull's plans began on January 17, when university president Edwin Harrison called a meeting of the student body at which he told students that the institution would not condone riots, demonstrations or disturbances, or that any student who instigated such activity could be faced with "immediate dismissal." In May 1961, Harrison announced that three black students had been accepted for fall admission, and Dull started a series of interactions with student leaders and organizations aimed at winning their support and cooperation for integration. After several months of planning by Georgia Tech's president and staff, integration was achieved that fall without any incidents. Georgia Tech became the first university in the Deep South to desegregate peacefully and without a court order, with Ford Greene, Ralph A. Long, Jr., and Lawrence Michael Williams becoming Georgia Tech's first three African American students. In later years, Harrison credited Dull with the institution's success in achieving integration without incident.

=== Buzz ===
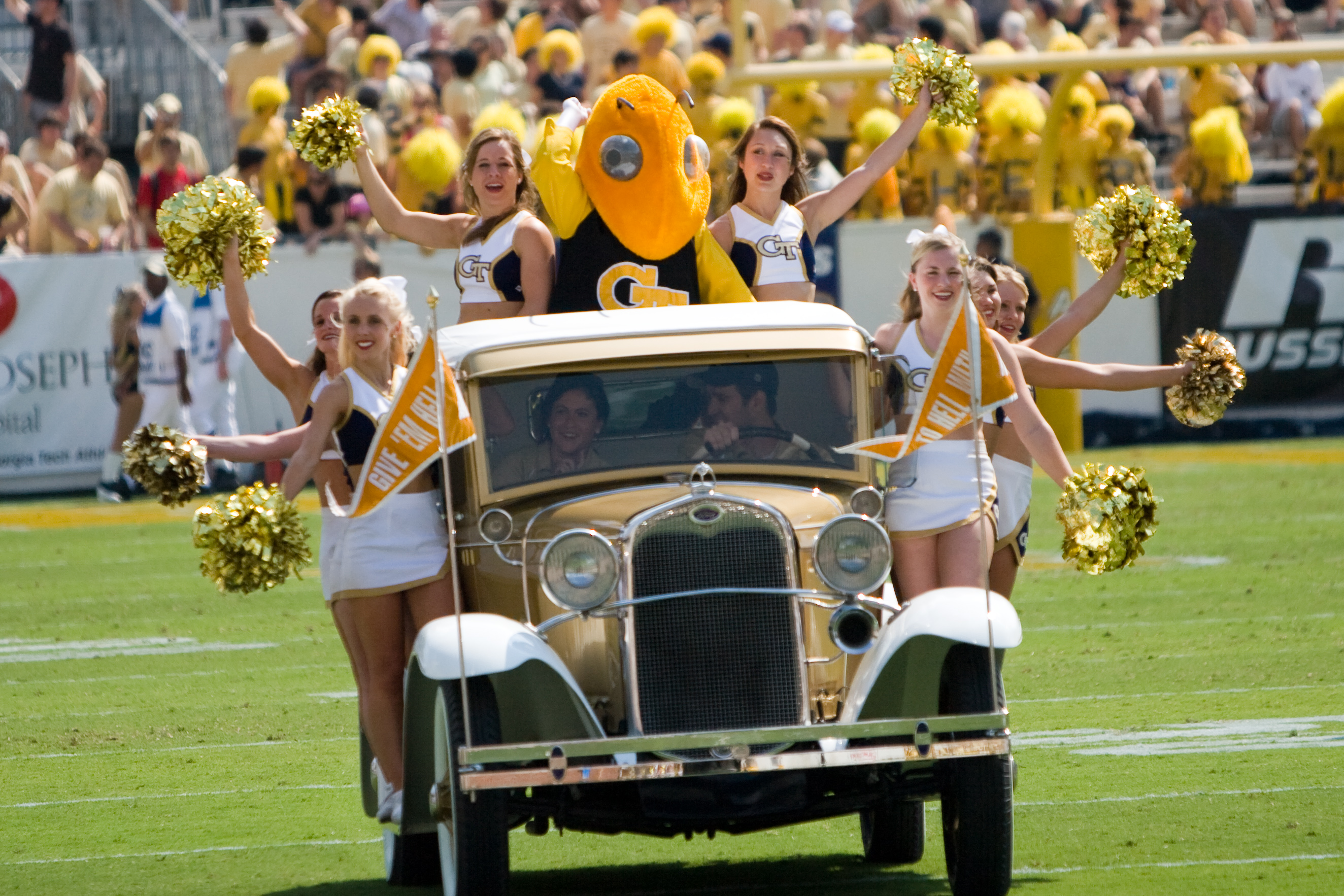
The Ramblin' Wreck with cheerleaders and Buzz at a football game in 2007

Dull realized that Tech needed a mascot so he worked with the Ramblin' Wreck Club to design the costume and personality of "Buzz," the Yellow Jacket Mascot.

=== Ramblin' Wreck ===
By the time Dull came to campus, the Ramblin' Wreck, initially just a general name for any Georgia Tech-engineered vehicle, had come to mean Dean Field's 1914 Ford Model T. Dull took the initiative to find a designated car to fill the role, and found it in a 1930 Ford Cabriolet. The Athletic Association purchased it and introduced it at the first home football game in 1961. Dull spotted the 1930 Ford Model A outside of his apartment located in Towers Residence Hall in 1960. The owner was Captain Ted J. Johnson, Atlanta's chief Delta Air Lines pilot. Johnson had purchased the car from a junkyard in 1956. Johnson and his son, Craig, restored the car as a father-son project while Craig attended the Georgia Military Academy. The two spent two years and over $1,800 restoring the vehicle. After Craig graduated from high school, he attended Florida State on a track scholarship. In 1960, Craig's track team was in Atlanta competing against Tech. Johnson, wanting to see his son compete, took the Model A to Tech campus, parked it near Towers Residence Hall, and went to watch Craig compete. When Johnson returned to his car, he found a note from Dean Dull attached to his windshield. Dull's note offered to purchase the car to serve as Georgia Tech's official mascot. Johnson agreed to take $1,000 but would eventually return the money in 1984 so that the car would be remembered as an official donation to Georgia Tech and the Alexander-Tharpe Fund. The Ramblin' Wreck was unveiled September 30, 1961 at Grant Field in front of 43,501 Tech fans as it led the team onto the field against Rice University. The team prevailed 24–0 and the Wreck became an instant success within the Tech family. The Wreck has since led the team onto the field for every home game.

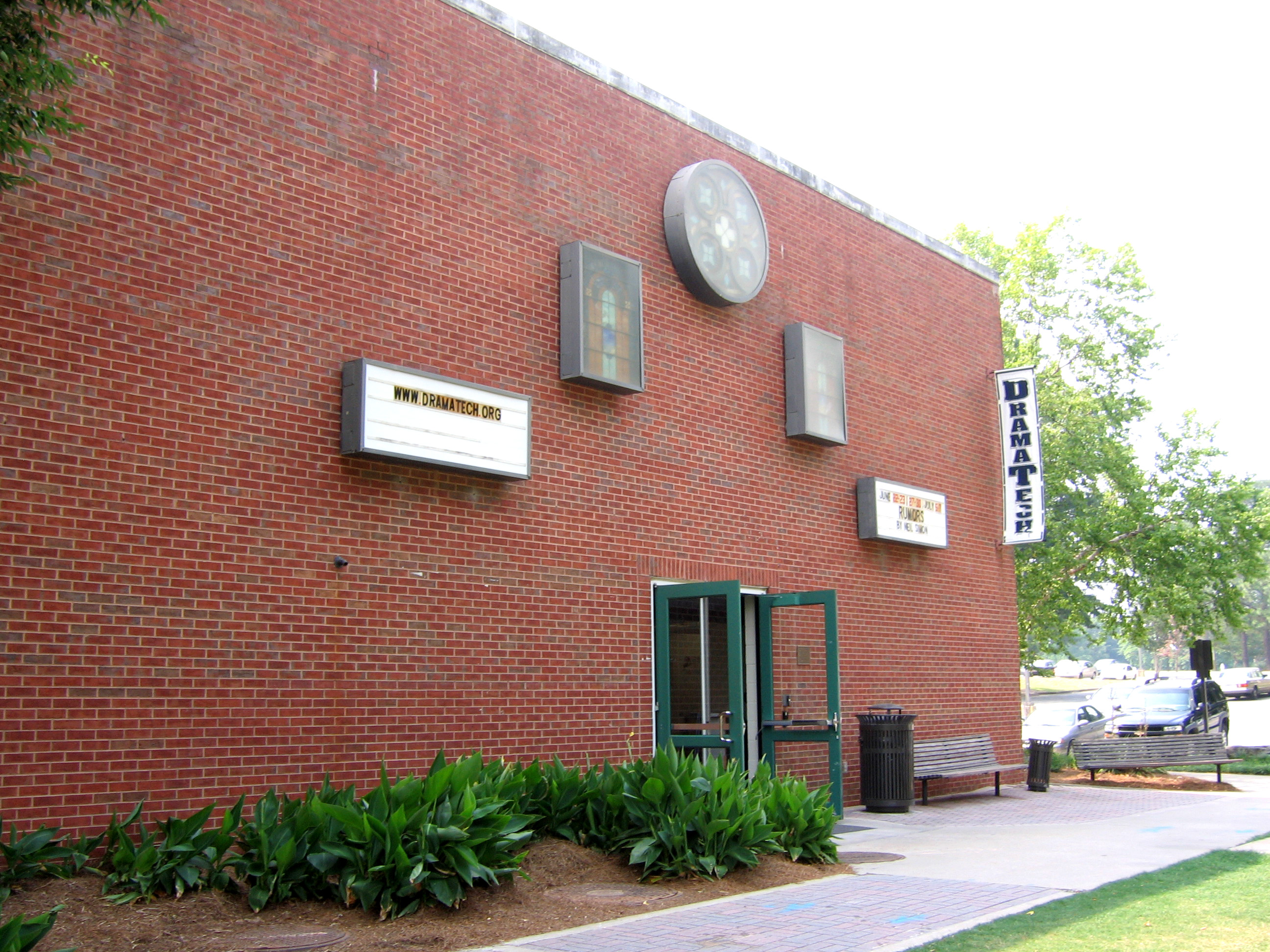
Dean James E. Dull DramaTech Theatre

=== DramaTech ===
Dull supported the development of DramaTech during his tenure, and he helped search for a permanent location for Georgia Tech's drama program. DramaTech had been housed in several different buildings over the years, such as the old YMCA, two buildings behind The Varsity, and in a church on the corner of Hemphill Street. Finally, the Dean James E. Dull DramaTech Theatre was built in 1992 adjacent to the Robert Ferst Center for the Arts and named in his honor. Dull and his wife Gay established the 'Gay K. Dull Scholarship' which is awarded to two students each year who have participated with DramaTech programs.

=== Other construction ===
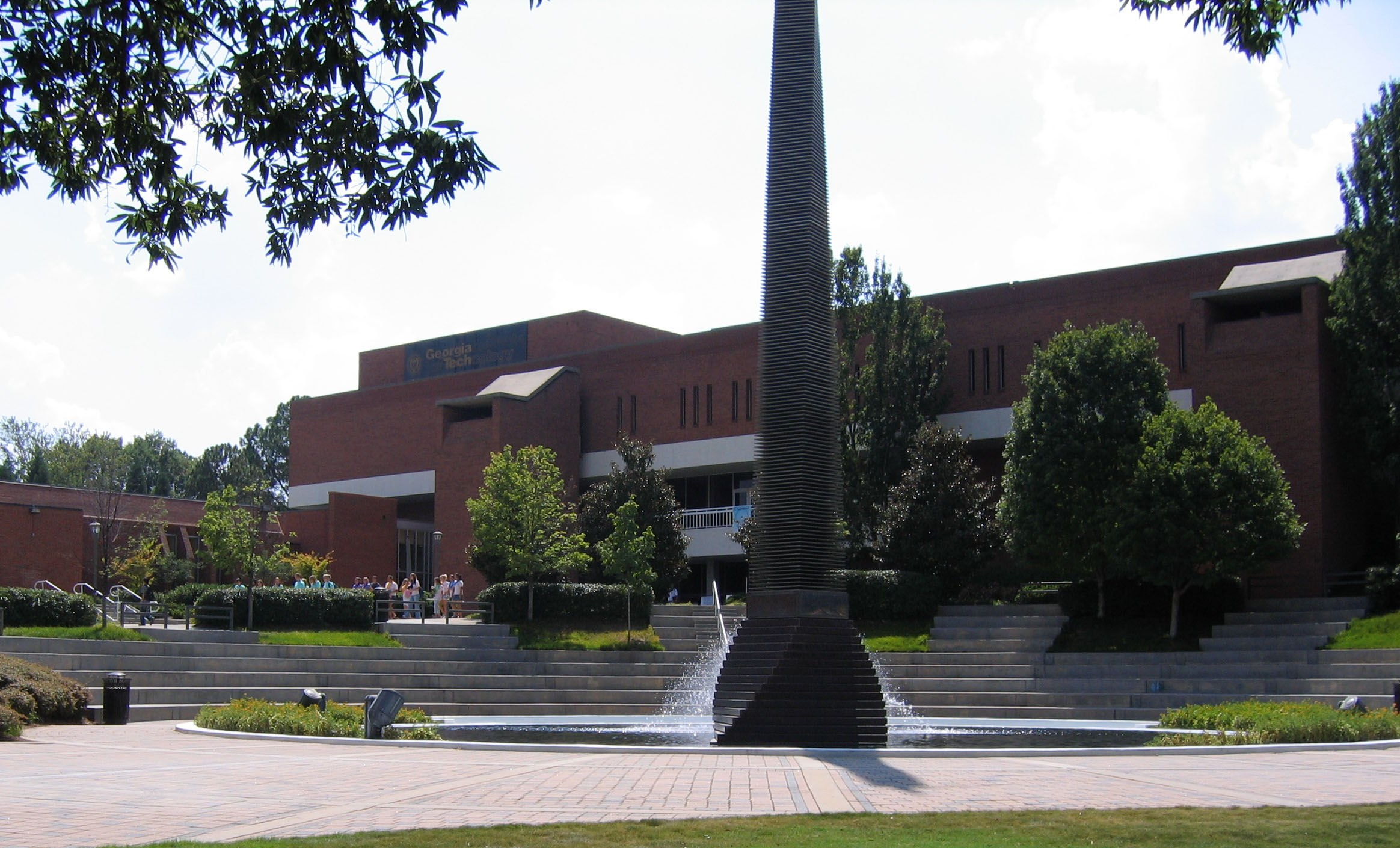
GT Student Center and Kessler Campanile

President Harrison provided support to Dean Dull with his efforts to renovate all buildings in Area I on the Georgia Tech campus. Dull also helped raise funds to build a student center. In addition, Dull was instrumental in the building of the Student Athletic Complex, the Student Services Building, and a student health center.

=== Fraternity Award ===
Georgia Tech provides the 'James E. Dull Overall Fraternity Award' as annual recognition for the most accomplished member of the Greek community for the previous year, including involvement around campus in non-Greek activities. The award ranks fraternity chapters on the following seven categories: Scholarship, Leadership, Philanthropy/Community Service, Intramurals, Greek Week, Homecoming, and Educational Programming.
