= Traditions of the Georgia Institute of Technology =

Aspect of Georgia Tech culture

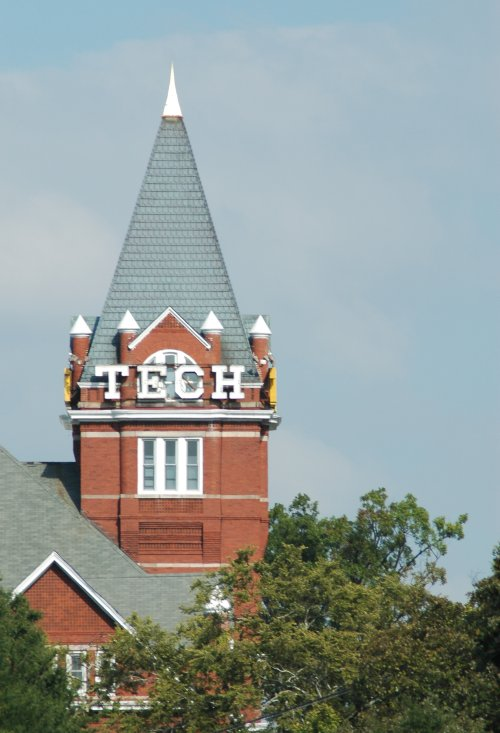
Georgia Tech's Tech Tower

Numerous Georgia Tech legends and traditions have been established since the school's opening in 1888, some of which have persisted for decades. One of the holdovers from Tech's early years is a steam whistle blows every weekday at various times to mark the changing of classes. It's for this reason that the faculty newspaper is named The Whistle.

Some of the traditions are well-known, the most notable being the now-banned tradition of stealing the "T" from Tech Tower. Tech Tower, Tech's historic primary administrative building, has the letters TECH hanging atop it on each of its four sides. A number of times, students have orchestrated complex plans to steal the huge symbolic letter T, and on occasion have carried this act out successfully. One especially well-known tradition that has existed nearly since the school's establishment is Clean, Old-Fashioned Hate, Georgia Tech's heated, long-standing and ongoing rivalry with the University of Georgia. The first known hostilities between the two schools trace back to 1891.

Several legends originated at Georgia Tech. George P. Burdell, Tech's ever-present fictional student, was created in 1927 when a student filled out two application forms. Burdell went on to lead a long life; he earned several degrees, fought in World War II, and almost won Time's 2001 Person of the Year award. Georgia Tech is also known for the largest margin of victory in a football game, achieved in their 222-0 thrashing of Cumberland University in the 1916 Cumberland vs. Georgia Tech football game.

== Traditions ==
=== Stealing the T ===
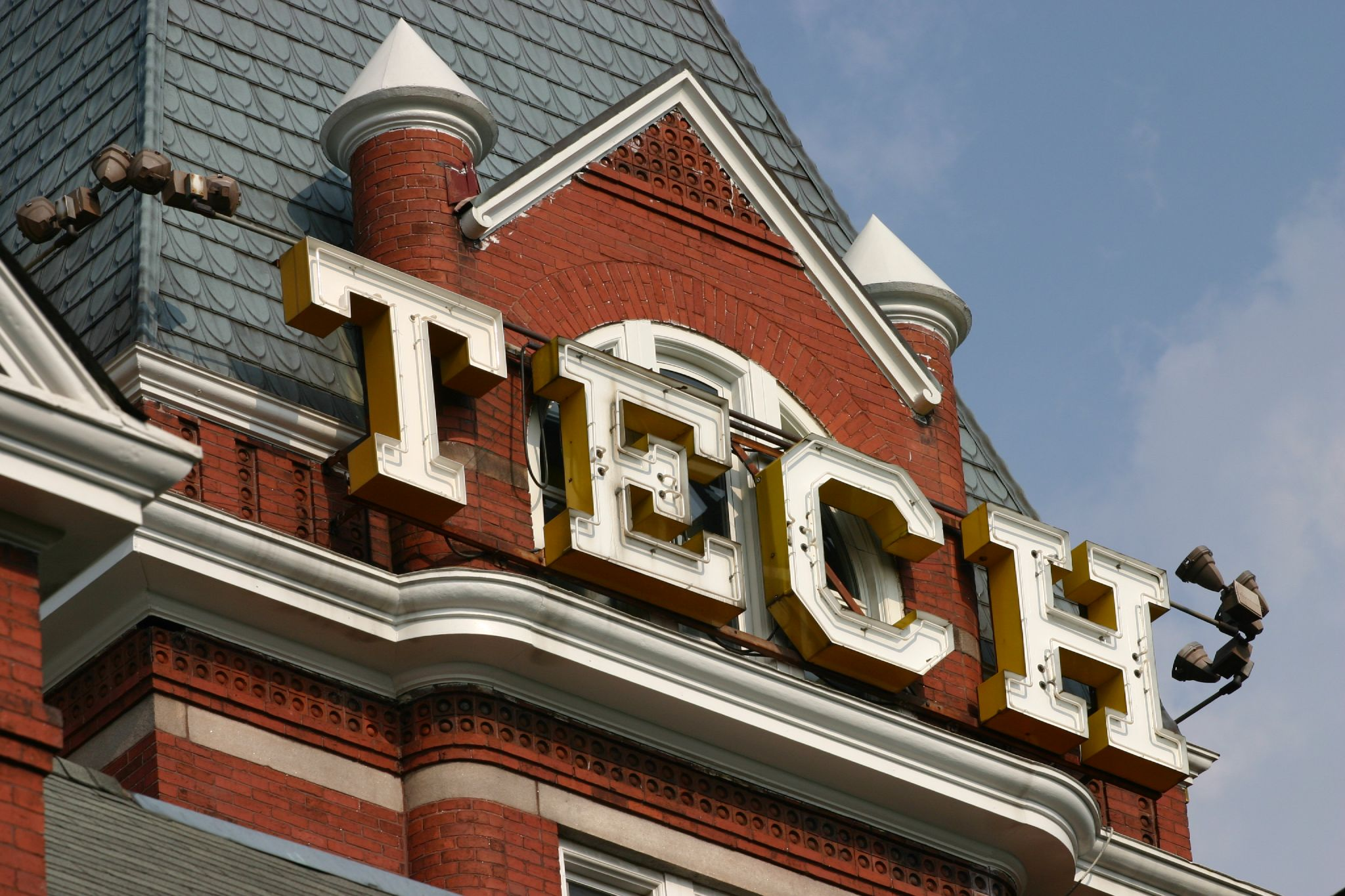
A closeup of Tech Tower

Tech's historic and primary administrative building, Tech Tower, has the letters TECH hanging atop it on each of its four sides. Since 1969, students on several occasions have orchestrated complex plans to scale Tech Tower and steal the huge symbolic letter T off the building. The 'T' was first stolen in April 1969 by a secret group of Georgia Tech students calling themselves the "Magnificent Seven." The students, who were inspired by a similar prank that had taken place in 1968 at Harvard University, planned the theft as a means of commemorating Institute President Edwin D. Harrison's retirement. The 'T' was returned several days later via helicopter at the behest of Atlanta mayor Ivan Allen.

Following successful thefts, the T would then be returned at the halftime of the homecoming football game or would be returned to the lawn of the president's mansion, and the student's achievement would be celebrated. Tradition dictates that the first T to be stolen should be the one facing east, as this can most easily be seen from the I-75/I-85 Downtown Connector. Although the administration used to turn a blind eye to this practice, it is now officially discouraged, due to the risk of fatal falls and the potential for damage to the building, and equated to criminal activity (trespassing and theft). In recent years, this has become a serious offense, and perpetrators today would face a hefty fine to repair damages done to the building and a minimum of a semester-long suspension for attempting the feat, if not outright expulsion.

Security features such as security cameras, pressure sensitive roof tiling, and fiber optic cabling running throughout the letters have been added to the T to help prevent its theft and aid in catching the perpetrators. In 1999, the T was successfully stolen by a group of "six or seven people" on the morning of June 3. The location of that T is still unknown. In 2001, two members of the fraternity Beta Theta Pi were caught and suspended in an attempt to steal the T. In October 2005, a replica of the T was stolen from the Student Services Building and returned two days later. Despite the lack of physical danger involved in stealing the spare T, the theft was still strongly criticized. The most recent successful theft of the T occurred during Georgia Tech's spring break on March 18, 2014, which was the first time since 1999 that it had been successfully stolen.

=== Ramblin' Wreck ===
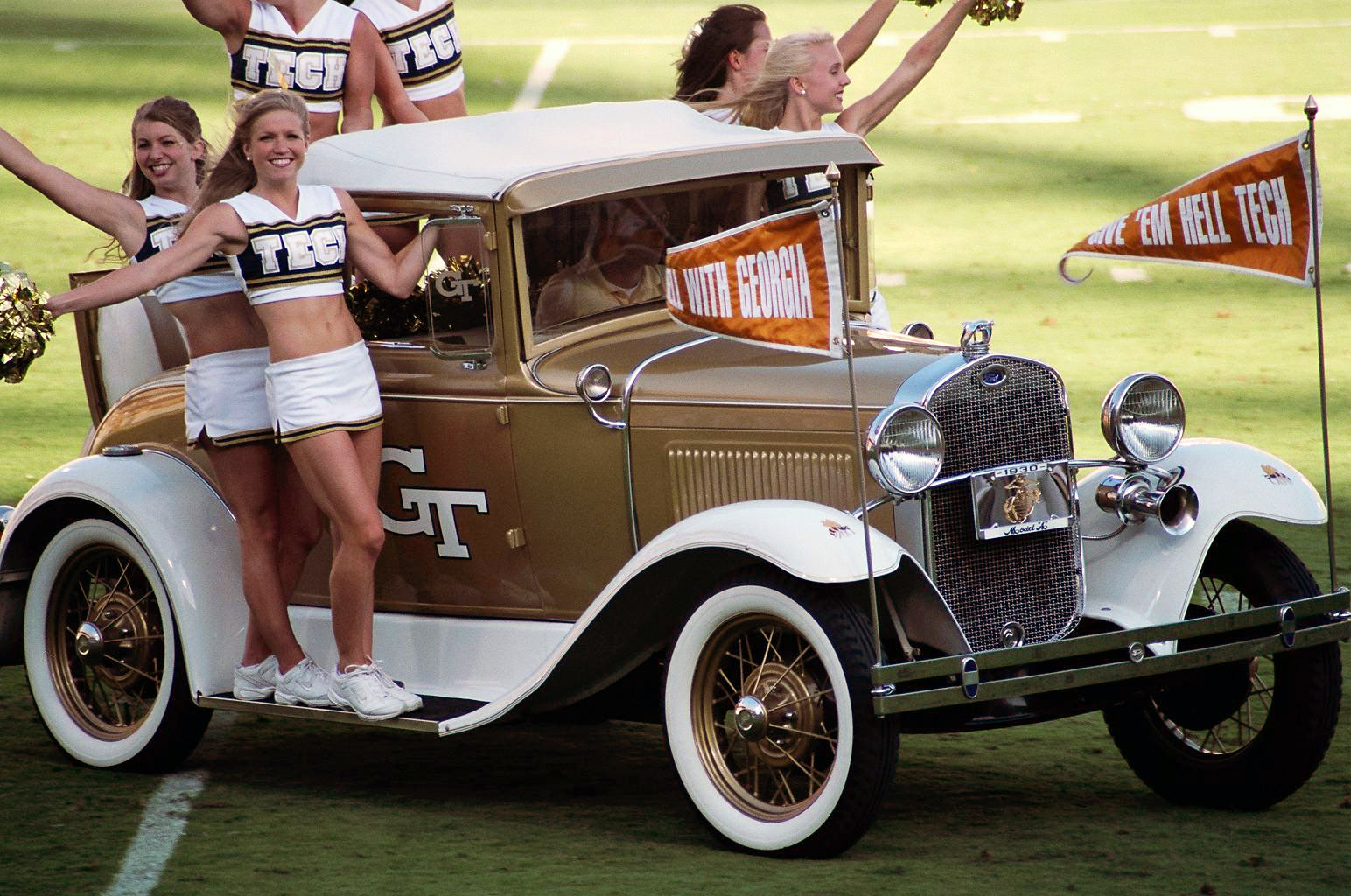
The Ramblin' Wreck during a football game.

The term Ramblin' Wreck from Georgia Tech refers to either current students or alumni, the school mascot (also referred to as the Ramblin' Reck), or the various sports teams. Georgia Tech alumni, working on the construction of the Panama Canal, were called Ramblin' Wrecks for the ingenious machines that they devised to transport themselves in and out of the jungles of Panama. These devices and their creators were nicknamed Ramblin' Wrecks from Georgia Tech. Since then the term Ramblin' Wreck has been applied to a graduate or current student of Georgia Tech. The actual Ramblin' Reck is a 1930 Ford Model A Sports Coupe first acquired by then-associate dean of students James E. Dull, in 1961. The first Ramblin' Wreck mascot reference was in 1926 to Dean Floyd Field's 1914 Ford Model T. Sports teams of Georgia Tech are also called the Ramblin' Wreck. The fight song for Georgia Tech "I'm a Rambling Wreck" begins with the lyrics, "I'm a Ramblin' Wreck from Georgia Tech and a hell of an engineer." The song is sung at sporting events, official school functions, and always at the end of every graduation ceremony.

=== The Whistle ===
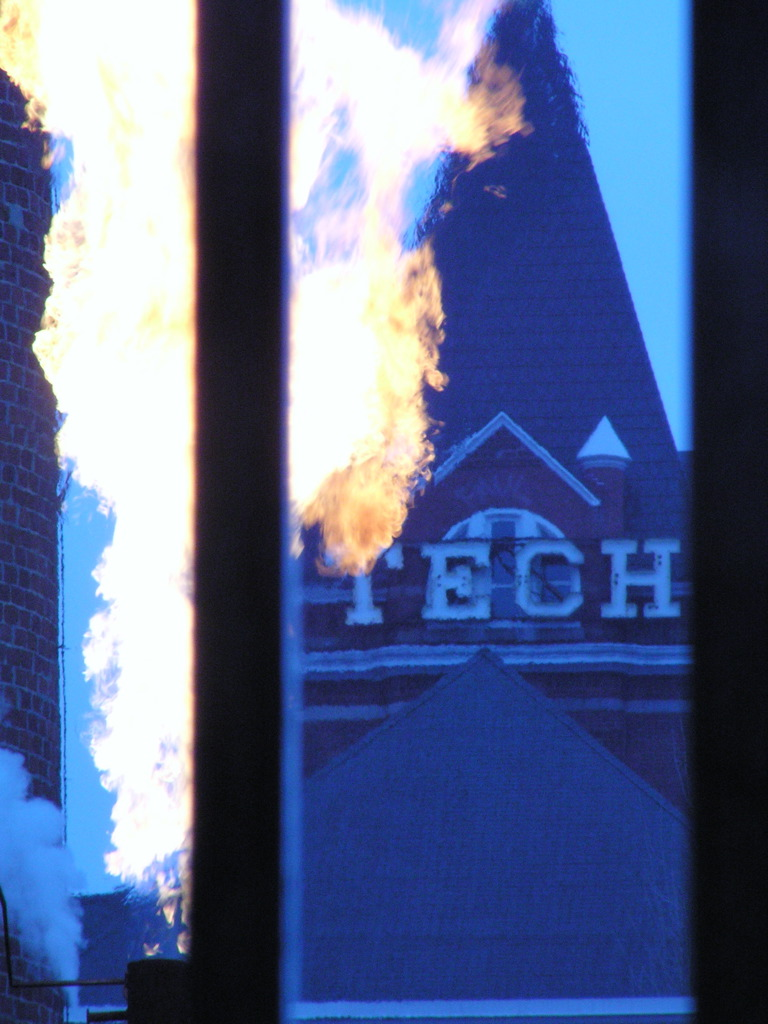
Georgia Tech's steam whistle (the grey smoke on the bottom-left) with a fuel burn-off and Tech Tower in the background.

A steam whistle that blows at various times throughout the day to mark the end of classes. This tradition is a hold over from the trade school days, originally used to mark the end of a shift in the shops; now it is used both to mark the end of classes and as a fifteen-minute warning to the beginning of the next classes. It is also blown when Georgia Tech's football team scores a touchdown or wins a game, and at each spring's "When the Whistle Blows" remembrance ceremony.

Although not as popular as "stealing the T", the whistle has been stolen several times. The first ever Tech whistle installed in the late 1890s was stolen in 1902. The whistle was returned to Dean Griffin in 1949 as a retirement gift. The second theft of the whistle occurred in 1963, when a group of students nicknamed the "Magnificent 7" stole the whistle. Fearing Institute repercussions, the group returned the whistle in the spring of 1964. The whistle was again stolen in 1978 by a group nicknamed the "Committee of Five". The whistle was also stolen in 1969 and 1997. Both times the whistle was returned almost immediately after its theft. In 1969, the whistle was given to the student body president as a graduation gift a month after its theft and the 1997 theft was solved when President Clough found the whistle on his lawn a day after its theft.

The current steam whistle, located near Tech Tower, was built by the GTRI Machine Shop and installed in 2004. Prior to the Fall 2017 semester, the Whistle blew five minutes before the hour, every hour from 8:55 am to 5:55 pm, but following a modification of the class schedule, the whistle now follows a modified blowing schedule. The Faculty newspaper is also named The Whistle.

=== To Hell With Georgia ===
Georgia Tech has an ongoing rivalry with the University of Georgia, often simply called "Georgia" for short. The rivalry was called Clean, Old-Fashioned Hate by Atlanta Journal-Constitution columnist and UGA supporter, Lewis Grizzard. An annual issue of the Institute newspaper, The Technique, focuses on this rivalry with an issue that spoofs The Red and Black, the newspaper of the University of Georgia. As a dig at the rival school, the Technique will typically refer to it as "the university (sic) of Georgia" (sometimes shortened to "u(sic)GA") in articles. "To Hell With Georgia" (abbreviated "THWG" or "THWUGA"or "THWg") is also known as "The Good Word." In 2009, the Georgia Tech Cable Network, produced a show about the history of Clean, Old-Fashioned Hate titled 'To Hell With Georgia'. If one student asks the word from another ("What's the Good Word?"), the response is always "To Hell with Georgia!" If asked about the Bulldogs ("How 'bout them Dawgs?"), an old tagline from the "University of Georgia" expression, the correct answer is, "Piss on 'em!"

=== RAT caps ===
Georgia Tech Rat Cap inscription diagram.

Every year, a number of freshmen, most notably those in the marching band, wear gold caps known as RAT caps at each football game. RAT is short for Recruit At Tech, although recently the Student Government has begun incorrectly using "Recently Acquired Tech Students" or "Recently Acquired Techie". The RAT caps are decorated with the football team's scores, the freshman's name, hometown, major, expected graduation date, and "To HELL With Georgia" emblazoned on the back of the cap. It is important that 'HELL' should be in all capital letters, while 'Georgia' should be all lowercase. Students who intend to utilize the cooperative education program circle the top button on the cap, and fill it in once they have completed their involvement.

The tradition began in 1915, and freshmen were required to wear the RAT caps every day until the Thanksgiving weekend game with UGA (if Georgia Tech won) or until end of the school year (if Georgia Tech lost). If Tech did not play UGA that year, freshmen were allowed to stop wearing their caps after a homecoming game victory. If the team lost, then the previously stated rules applied. Freshmen caught not wearing the cap faced varying degrees of hazing, including having their hair shaved into the shape of a letter tee ("T") or a T-cut. Anti-hazing laws in the 1960s led to the virtual elimination of the tradition, although the use of RAT caps is still actively maintained by the marching band.

The RAT rules enforced by upperclassmen and in particular the Ramblin' Reck Club are presented in the July 17, 1964, edition of the Technique. The rules are listed below:

A Georgia Tech RAT...

1. Will wear a "RAT" cap with proper inscription at all times. It is not mandatory that the "RAT" cap be worn on Sundays.
2. Will know the school songs – Ramblin' Wreck, Alma Mater, White & Gold, and all cheers.
3. Will attend and participate in all "RAT" sings.
4. Will speak to everyone – a Techman is proud of his association with his school and fellow students.
5. Will not enter the campus post office between 9:45 and 10:15 A.M. on school days.
6. Will not wear high school letters or emblems on the campus.

=== Junior's Grill ===
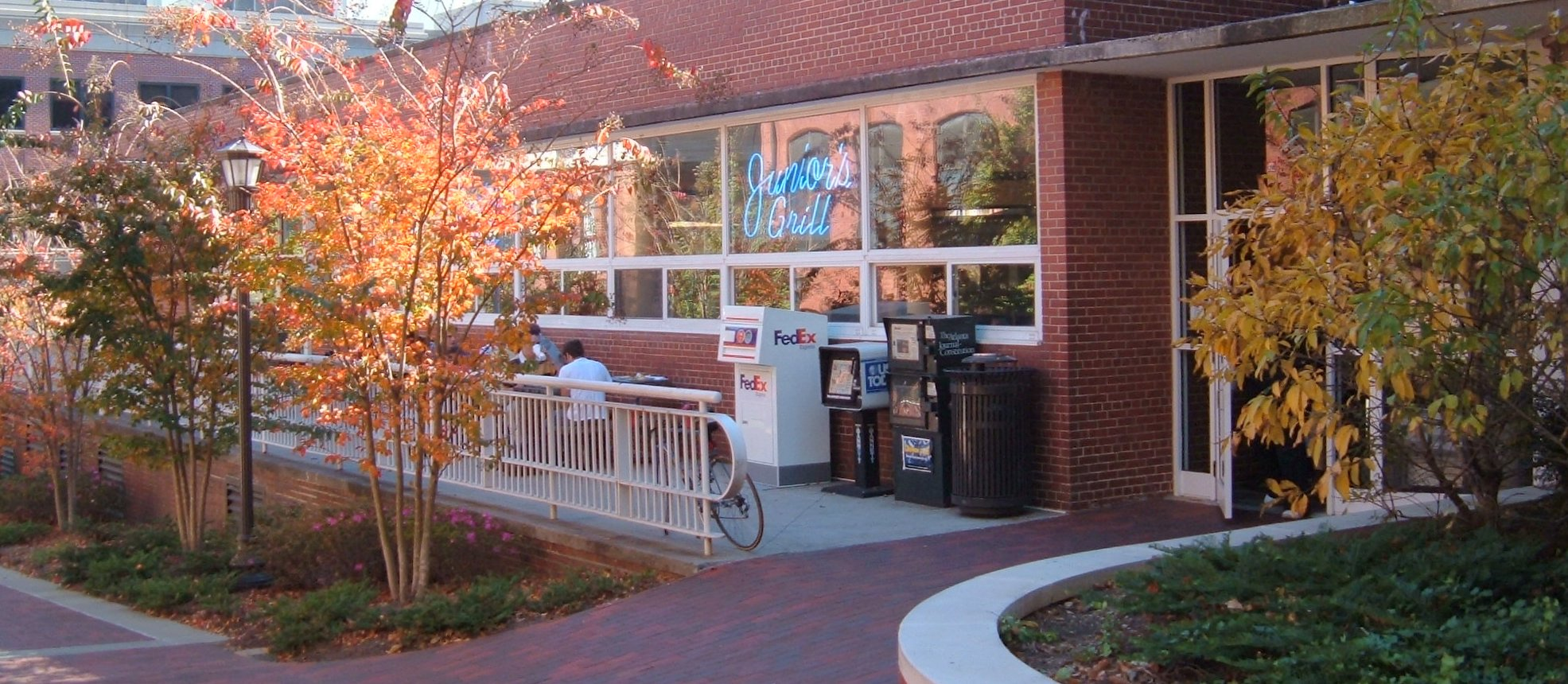
Junior's Grill, on the side of Tech Tower

Junior's Grill was a restaurant located in East Campus next to Tech Tower. The restaurant was first opened in 1948 under the name Pilgrim's and was originally located on the corner of North Avenue and Techwood Drive. Its name changed to Junior's Grill in 1958, and it moved locations twice since then. Due to the need to construct apartments for the 1996 Summer Olympics, the restaurant was forced to close and vacate its North Avenue location in October 1993; in February 1994, it reopened in the Bradley Building. It was owned and operated by Tommy Klemis, an electrical engineering graduate of Georgia Tech.

The restaurant housed pieces of Tech history, including aerial photographs of campus from various years, assorted Georgia Tech memorabilia, portraits of prominent individuals in Tech's history, and a section of the goalpost from Tech's 1990 National Championship game in the Citrus Bowl. Junior's Grill closed permanently in April 2011, citing slow business as the reason.

=== Homecoming ===
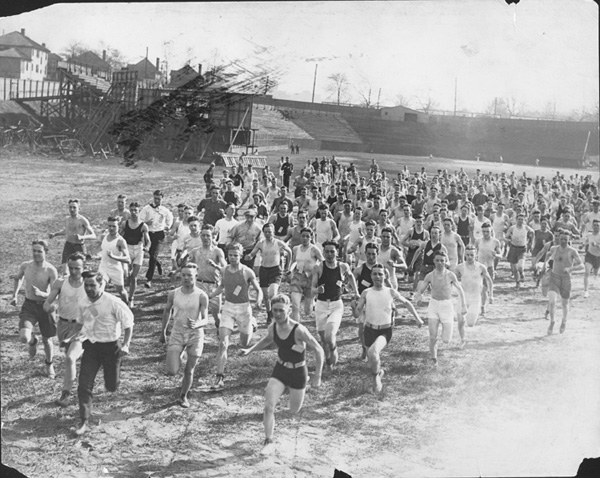
The 1922 Freshman Cake Race

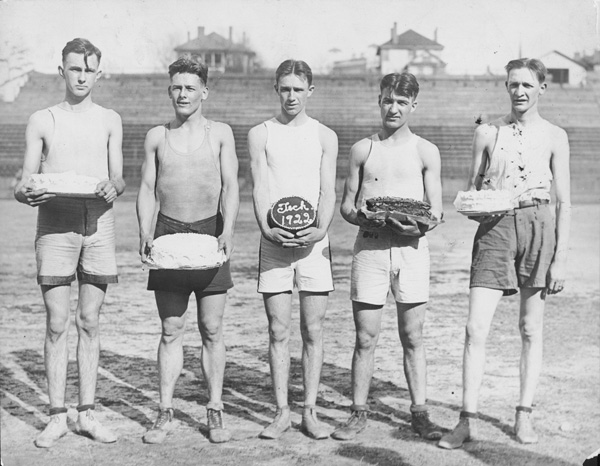
The winners of the 1922 Freshman Cake Race

Georgia Tech Homecoming is a celebration held once a year for alum of the Institute to return to campus and take part in several festivities and Institute traditions. The themed homecoming festivities all lead up to a Saturday football contest. The events are usually led off with various Greek sports tournaments followed by the Mini 500, Freshman Cake Race, and the Wreck Parade. Every year the student body elects a Mr. and Ms. Georgia Tech. These are two individuals who have excelled in academics and extracurriculars on Tech campus. The titles changed from homecoming king and queen to Mr. and Ms. Georgia Tech in 1987 at the request of Dean James E. Dull.

The first homecoming was organized by ANAK in 1916. In 2008, Georgia Tech hosted the Virginia Cavaliers for its 92nd homecoming celebration and ended a twelve game win streak in homecoming contests. Tech is 44-13-1 since 1949 in its homecoming football games.

==== Mini 500 ====
The Mini 500 is a tricycle race held during homecoming every year that requires teams to complete laps around Peters Parking Deck on East Campus. Men must complete 15 laps, while women must complete 10. There are mandatory pit stops in which the front tire must be rotated 3 times during the course of the race. Because the average racer weighs more than the average 5-year-old, the car is allowed one support brace to be welded onto the frame.

The race traces its roots back to the early 1960s, when fraternity pledges were forced to ride tricycles around campus as a form of hazing. The race was eventually formalized in 1969, and rules were instituted to make the Mini 500 an instant classic.

==== Wreck Parade ====
The Ramblin' Wreck Parade is a parade of classic cars and engineering oddities held before every homecoming football game. There are three classes of vehicles, which participate in the competition. The first class is known simply as classic cars and these are vehicles over a certain age limit (currently 25 years). The second class is known as fixed bodies and these vehicles are normal cars, which have only been cosmetically modified retaining their original drive train. These are often themed, but are distinctly different from floats and are prohibited from being "pseudo-wrecks displaying pomps". The third class is contraptions. Here, wheel-driven vehicles (that is, those using a conventional drive train) are banned; human power has been used instead, as has propeller drive and jet engines. Judging criteria include both creativity and effective operation.

The Wreck parade dates back to 1929 when The Technique began an "Old Ford Race" to Athens. In 1932, the race was deemed unsafe by the administration so a parade of contraptions was created to subdue student protests. The parade has run every year since 1932 except for the years of 1942-1943. The American fuel shortage caused by World War II stopped the parade. In 1944, the parade was renewed except the contraptions had to be human powered. Gasoline power was allowed again in 1946.

==== Freshman Cake Race ====
The Freshman Cake Race is a foot race from the Russ Chandler Stadium to Bobby Dodd Stadium that takes place before sunrise (about 6:30 am) on the morning of the homecoming game. This distance is roughly a half-mile, so the crowd of several hundred participants engages in a mad sprint over the relatively short distance. Student attendance in recent years has reached approximately 1,000 per edition of the race. The race runs through the middle of the campus's Greek sector to the top of the "Freshman Hill", and is often subject to tampering by fraternity students. The competitors are usually freshmen and the race classification is split by gender. The winners receive cakes baked by faculty, alumni, or students, and all participants receive cupcakes. The winners also receive a kiss from Mr. or Ms. Georgia Tech at the homecoming half-time show.

The race began as a cross-country race in 1911. In 1913, the winners received cakes from wives, mothers, and other women affiliated with Tech. The race was initially mandatory for all students.

=== Spirit Organizations ===
==== Ramblin' Reck Club ====
The Ramblin' Reck Club was founded in 1930 as the Yellow Jacket Club to help bolster school spirit. Coach William Alexander found campus spirit to be particularly low during the Great Depression. His successful football program and the other athletic teams had very few student fans attending the games. In 1930, Alexander approached Professor Fred Wenn about organizing and founding such a club, who agreed to take up the task.

The Yellow Jacket Club helped facilitate the Freshman Cake Race and helped to organize the first Wreck Parades in 1932. The Yellow Jacket Club were the strict student enforcement of the freshmen RAT rules as well. The Yellow Jacket Club maintained prestige and political power on campus until late 1944. The Yellow Jacket Club was in charge of the 1945 school-wide Spring Social and failed to properly organize the event. The Technique, Blueprint, and Omicron Delta Kappa rejuvenated the major event but the Yellow Jackets' reputation was severely tarnished. On May 8, 1945 the Yellow Jacket Club staged a last-ditch effort to reorganize the traditions club but by July 14, 1945 the club was disbanded.

When new freshmen arrived on campus in 1945, the student body was concerned that traditions would be lost with the disbandment of the Yellow Jackets. A new traditions club was actively pursued by Anak to instill the rich Tech tradition into new freshmen. The new club was the Ramblin' Reck Club and it was established in late July 1945. The first order of business for the new Ramblin' Reck Club was to stage a Pep Meeting and traditions review for new freshmen. Reck Club was designed to prevent political domination by individual social fraternities as Yellow Jacket Club had been. Membership in Reck Club was limited to two individuals per fraternity or military ROTC program. A group known as the T-Club was charged with upholding the RAT rules with incoming freshmen.

Four years after Tech became coed, Reck Club became the first non-faith-based organization on campus to admit a female member. Paula Stevenson was the club's first female member in 1956. Under Reck Club, the strict RAT rules slowly faded away. Anti-hazing laws severely diminished Reck Club's ability to punish Tech freshmen for disobeying the RAT rules in 1965. By 1967, the Club was given a more wholesome duty.

Reck Club was given charge of the Ramblin' Wreck in 1967 following the disbandment of the Student Council's Reck Committee. A member from Reck Club known as the wreck driver has been elected annually since 1967 to drive the Wreck onto Grant Field for football games and other school functions.

Reck Club was the first group to make attempts at humanoid mascots on Tech Campus. The first was a bee costume donned by Judi McNair of Reck Club. She sported her bee costume to home basketball games and pep rallies. In 1973, a spandex-clad hero named T-Man and his faithful sidekick T^{2} patrolled campus in search of opposing mascots and fans. T-Man would perform spirit skits at pep rallies and home basketball games. Often seen riding in the Ramblin' Wreck, T-Man was an anonymous member of the Reck Club until his mysterious disappearance in 1975.

The Ramblin' Reck Club today oversees several homecoming traditions such as the Freshman Cake Race, the Mini 500, and the Wreck Parade. Reck Club also serves as a bridge between Georgia Tech Athletics and the Georgia Tech student body organizing the Swarm cheering section, pep rallies, flashcards sections, and other spirit related events.

==== Bull Dog Club ====
The Bull Dog Club was an honor society created in 1910 originally as a social branch of Tech's Koseme Society. The Bull Dogs first major role was facilitating the first cross country races that eventually evolved into the Freshman Cake Race. The Bull Dogs only admitted rising juniors and seniors into their ranks in order to maintain prestige and honor in the club.

The Bull Dogs rise to Institute prominence also led to their eventual demise. The Bull Dogs put a particular emphasis on mediating campus-wide sporting events. The Bull Dogs utilized their Cake Race ties to the Athletic Association in order to coordinate the first intramurals on the athletic playing fields.

The Bull Dogs also aided in spirit and tradition upkeep on campus by aiding in Ramblin' Wreck Parade judging, homecoming queen selection, and homecoming dance planning. Despite the Bull Dogs roles in homecoming celebrations, their intramural coordination became their primary focus by the 1960s. With the planning of the Student Athletic Center, intramurals were placed under official Institute control rather than the Bull Dogs and in 1969 the Bull Dogs were disbanded, relinquishing all homecoming duties to Ramblin' Reck Club and the student government.

==== Georgia Tech Bands ====
The Georgia Tech Bands are student musical groups fielded at many of the home athletic and schoolwide events. None of the musicians receive scholarships for participating in the assorted bands meaning the bands are composed entirely of volunteers.

Every home football game and most away games include a 300 member Georgia Tech marching band performing during dead ball time and half-time. The GT Bands also field smaller pep bands at home basketball, ice hockey, and volleyball games. The bands are known to follow teams for special events such as bowl games and basketball tournaments. The ice hockey pep band in particular travels to Savannah every year for the Thrasher cup. The band has some of the richest traditions on campus, including a strict enforcement of RAT caps amongst first year band members, no matter their actual year in college.

The first Georgia Tech bands were formed in 1908 and led by "Biddy" Bidez. Bidez lead the group until his graduation in 1912. He was succeeded by another student named Mike Greenblatt who continued in Bidez's footsteps until 1913. Greenblatt wrote the first versions of "Ramblin' Wreck from Georgia Tech". The first professional band director was Frank "Wop" Roman. Roman is noted for writing Tech's Alma Mater as well as "Up With the White and Gold". Roman copyrighted "Ramblin' Wreck from Georgia Tech" in 1919 and led the bands until his death in 1928. Since Roman there have been seven professional band directors. The directors have had varying levels of success and longevity.

==== Swarm ====
The Swarm is a spirit group consisting of 900 Georgia Tech students found seated along the north end zone during home football games and on the court during basketball games. The Swarm was started by Suzanne "Suzy Swarm" Robinson, who borrowed the idea from her sister and a high school friend both also heading to Tech for a way to build a strong community through community cohesion especially freshman, of the Ramblin' Reck Club in 1996 to increase the amount of student participation in the stands. The Swarm was only 250 members when it began in 1996. The group increased to 650 members by 2001 and is currently 900 members strong. All Swarm members donate to the Alexander-Tharpe fund and are given gold T-shirts before every football and basketball season. One of the more popular traditions amongst Swarm members is the "Running of the Swarm". Because all Swarm seating is general admission, there are no reserved seats. The Swarm members must run once the gate is opened to get the best seats.

==== Flashcards ====
A flashcard display is performed at every home football game by students. The flashcard section was first formed in 1957 by an organization known as the Block-T Club. The idea for a flashcard section and group to organize its efforts was conceived by members of the Sigma Chi fraternity. Through the support of Ramblin' Reck Club the first flashcard section featured 400 freshmen and highly coordinated flashcard images. The original flashcard sections were completely voluntary but afterwards, the Swarm maintained the tradition as a mandatory requirement of being a member of Swarm. Currently, the flashcard display is no longer performed due to difficulty coordinating it. It was last performed in the 2011 football season.

==== Goldfellas ====
The Goldfellas are a group of Georgia Tech superfans who paint their entire bodies yellow, spelling out words and phrases in black letters on their chests. These painted fans attend every home football game and are located behind the South end zone goalpost. Occasionally, the Goldfellas will attend home basketball, volleyball, or other sporting events. The group had its origins in the 1998 Georgia Tech football season, when a group of guys painted up for the homecoming game against the favored Virginia Cavaliers, the second of the fabled 41-38 games. The Jackets upset the Cavaliers and the tradition was started and passed on by residents in the now-defunct Area II dormitories. Each member is given a unique face design that is retired upon his graduation. The group is not considered an official club as its members do not bow to any charters and are not affiliated with Swarm. The Goldfellas take pride in their complete lack of clothing besides a yellow wig and gym shorts. The group never sits during the course of a football game, not even during halftime. The largest gathering of the Goldfellas occurred in the 2007 football game against rival University of Georgia with over 80 Tech students painted up with the Goldfellas for the event.

=== Fight songs ===
==== "Up With the White and Gold" ====
Lyrics:

Oh well it's up with the White and Gold,

Down with the Red and Black,
Georgia Tech is out for a victory.
We'll drop the battle-axe on Georgia's head,
When we meet her our team is sure to beat her.
Down on the old farm there will be no sound
Till our bow-wows rip through the air;
When the battle is over Georgia's team will be found

With the Yellow Jackets swarming around!

==== "Ramblin' Wreck from Georgia Tech" ====
"(I'm a) Ramblin' Wreck from Georgia Tech" is Georgia Tech's fight song. The composition is based on Son of a Gambolier by Charles Ives (1895), and the lyrics are based on an old English and Scottish drinking song of the same name. "Ramblin' Wreck" is played after every Georgia Tech score (directly after a field goal/safety and preceded by "Up With the White and Gold" after a touchdown) in a football game, and frequently during timeouts at basketball games. The title refers to the Ramblin' Wreck, one of Tech's mascots and a nickname for Tech students.

==== "Alma Mater" ====
Lyrics:

Oh, sons of Tech arise behold

The banner as it reigns supreme
For from on high the White and Gold
Waves in its triumphant gleam,
The spirit of the cheering Throng
Resounds with joy revealing
A brotherhood in praise and song
In memory of the days gone by.
Oh, Scion of the Southland
In our hearts you shall forever fly!

We cherish thoughts so dear for thee
Oh Alma Mater in our pray'r.
We plead for you in victory
And in the victory we share,
But when the battle seems in vain
Our spirits never falter
We're ever one in joy or pain
And our union is a lasting bond;
Oh may we be united

Till the victory of life is won!

==== Budweiser song ====
At every football game and every home basketball game, the fans of Georgia Tech perform an unusual dance at the end of the 3rd quarter in football and during the second to last television timeout of basketball. The dance is a simple bobbing motion which alternates every other person (simulating the up-and-down motion of the heads of the familiar team of Clydesdale horses) and is performed to the tune of an old Budweiser jingle. The Georgia Tech additional lyrics are as follows:

Go Georgia Tech!
Go Georgia Tech!
Go Georgia Tech!
Go Georgia Tech!
When you say Bud...weiser, you've said it all!

=== Pi Mile Road Race ===
The Dean George C. Griffin Pi Mile 5K Road Race is run annually in the spring on the Georgia Tech campus. One of the longest continually running races in Atlanta, it is named after former dean of students, George C. Griffin, in honor of his tenure as a track and cross country coach. The race founder is alumnus L. McTier "Mac" Anderson, class of 1967. The first race in 1973 was 3 miles long and was expanded to 3.14 miles after 1975—hence the Pi Mile. In 2002, the race distance was slightly shortened to 5 kilometers, intendedly to attract more runners. Another race tradition is the Ghost Run, where all the entrants sign up as George P. Burdell; participants pay the fee and get a T-shirt but do not have to run.

Part of the race is run along the Tyler Brown Pi-Mile Trail, a 3.14-mile running course around well-lit areas of the Georgia Tech campus, designated with disc-shaped markers and maps along the way. Tyler Brown was a former Student Government Association president who ran daily for ROTC and pushed heavily for a well-lit and safe running trail. Tyler Brown was killed in action in Iraq on September 14, 2004. The trail was completed in December 2004 and was dedicated in his honor in April 2005.

== Legends ==
=== Yellow Jackets ===
The term Yellow Jacket or Yellowjacket has been used to refer to students and the various sports teams as early as the 1890s. Fans of Georgia Tech would often wear yellow jackets to sporting events in support of the early Georgia Tech teams. The early football teams, lacking gold fabric for jerseys, wore yellow jerseys. John Heisman told the Atlanta Constitution that he wanted his teams to be referred to as the Yellow Jackets in October 1905. In November 1906, the Atlanta Journal portrayed a University of Georgia football player being attacked by a yellowjacket with the words "Somebody's going to get stung" as the caption. This would be the first time and not the last time that the Georgia Tech sports teams would be referred to as the Georgia Tech Yellow Jackets.

Buzz Bee became the anthropomorphized Yellow Jacket in 1979. He was initially an impromptu student volunteer but is now an official cheerleader that requires an intense tryout process. This Buzz character would be the model for a new Georgia Tech emblem, designed in 1985 by Mike Lester.

=== George P. Burdell ===
The legendary imaginary Tech student George P. Burdell who enrolled in 1927 is said to possess nearly every degree Georgia Tech offers, after many students took a variety of classes in his name. In 1927, a student, receiving two enrollment forms, also enrolled as George P. Burdell and attended as both names, so Burdell obtained a B.S. 1930, got a master's, and in World War II, went to Harvard and joined the Army Air Forces. Since the 1960s, some students have managed to re-enroll George P. Burdell in the institute registrar's computers. When Tech switched to online class registration, Burdell took every course offered that term. After initially vigorously searching for the hackers, the institute has since accepted the presence of George P. Burdell in every year's class. George P. Burdell is also a common tool for pranks at various school events and games. He usually gets paged over the stadium public address system at away sporting events.

=== The Cumberland Game ===
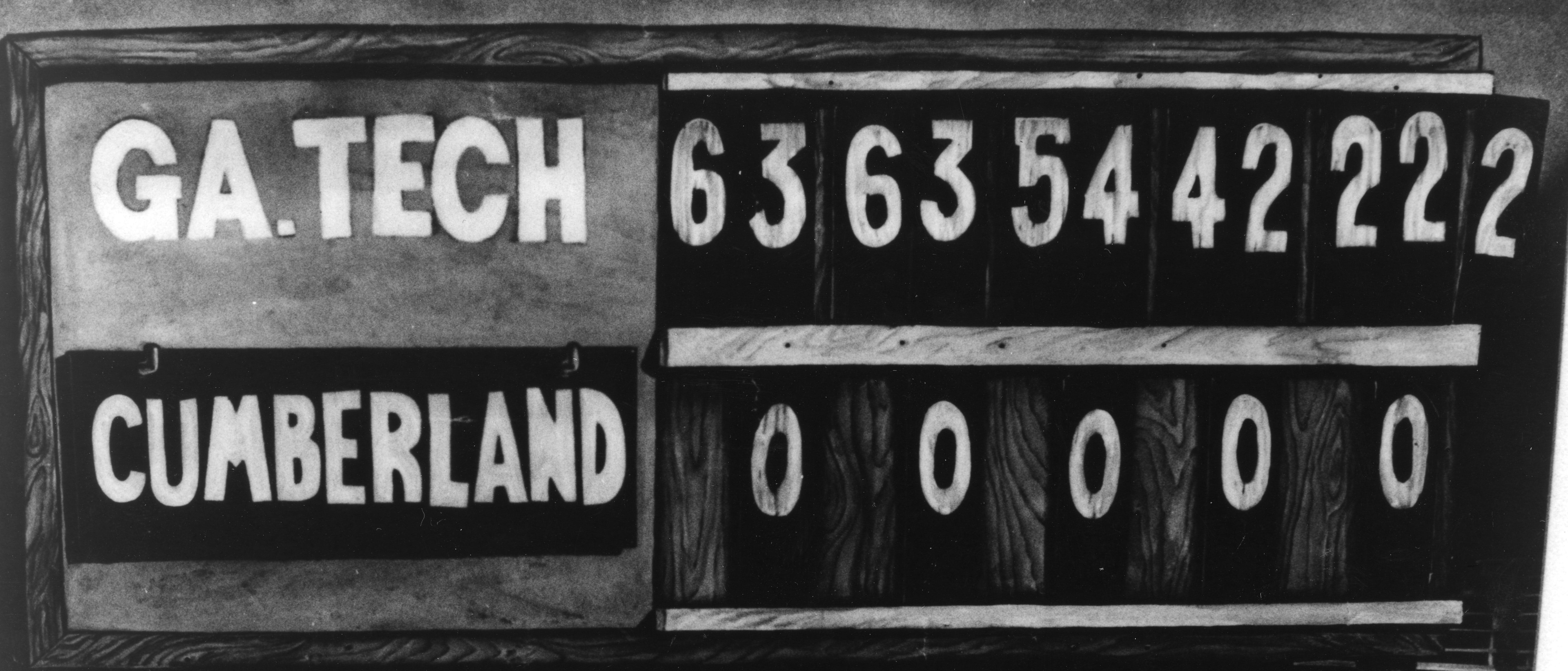
The scoreboard, displaying the largest margin of victory in football history.

In 1916, Georgia Tech's football team (coached by John Heisman—for whom the trophy is named) defeated Cumberland 222-0, the largest margin of victory in college football history. Cumberland's total net yardage was -28 (minus 28), and it had only one play for positive yards. Cumberland did not record a first down. Georgia Tech scored every time it got the ball; although one page on Cumberland's web site says that Georgia Tech scored on every offensive play, the play-by-play posted on its site indicates otherwise. Cumberland beat Georgia Tech's baseball team 22 to 0 the previous year, reportedly with the help of professional players Cumberland had hired as "ringers", an act which apparently infuriated Heisman.

=== 41–38 ===
41–38 is the score of two victories by Georgia Tech over Virginia in college football.

In 1990, Virginia won its first seven games and raced out to a #1 ranking in both polls. Undefeated but unheralded Georgia Tech came into Scott Stadium in Charlottesville and beat the Cavaliers 41–38 on a last-second field goal by Scott Sisson. This victory set off celebrations back in Atlanta that culminated in GT students breaking into Bobby Dodd Stadium, closed for the road game that weekend, and tearing down a goalpost (a common victory celebration when a game is played on one's home field). GT went on to be ACC champion and co-national champion with Colorado that season, which included Colorado's Fifth Down Game against Missouri. Virginia's season spiraled downhill from there, going 1–3 to finish 8–4 and ranked only #22.

In 1998, the first year since 1990 that both teams had come into this game with high hopes, #25 GT hosted undefeated #7 UVA, and again pulled off the upset. This time, the Jackets came from three touchdowns behind and survived a 54-yard field goal miss by UVA kicker Todd Braverman as time ran out. Since then, any time the two teams have met with rankings and bowl positions on the line, GT fans have used "41–38" as a rallying cry, similar to Miami fans' "Wide Right" against Florida State.

=== Sideways the Dog ===
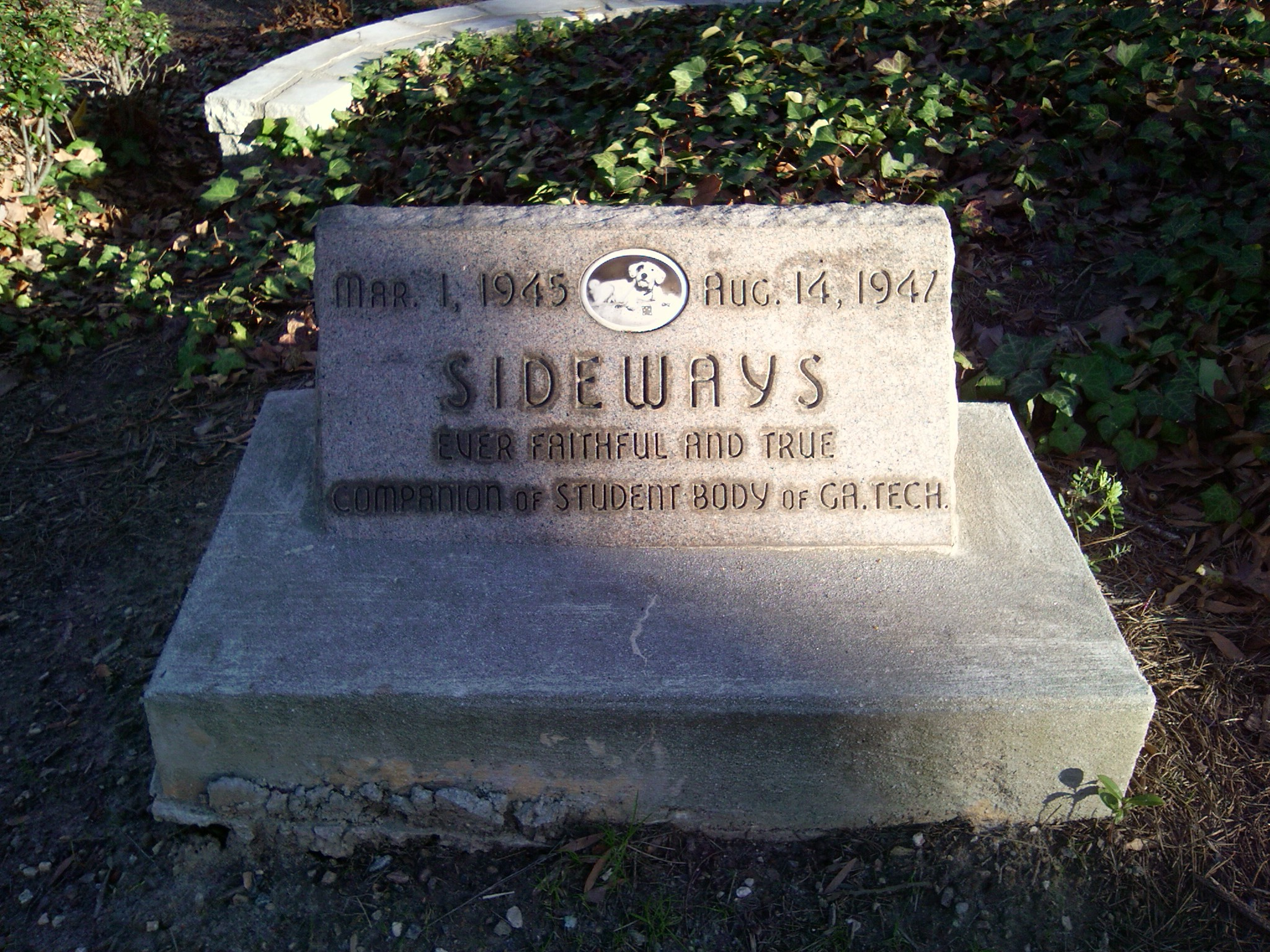
Headstone of Sideways the Dog (2007)

Sideways (March 1, 1945 – August 14, 1947) was a black and white female terrier who was thrown from a car near the Georgia Tech campus. Her injuries left the front and rear portions of her body out of alignment with each other and caused her to walk with an off-center gait, leading to her nickname. She was a favorite of the students, and often slept in a different dorm room every night, being fed through the generosity of the student body and Brittain Dining Hall. She would also accompany students to class and sleep during lectures.

Sideways died after accidentally ingesting some rat poison in one of the dorm rooms, and is buried on the grounds near the southeast corner of Tech Tower. A plaque marks her resting spot and briefly tells her story. It reads, "Sideways. Ever faithful and true. Companion of student body of Ga. Tech."

The headstone was recently rotated 90 degrees clockwise from what is shown in the picture at right so that Sideways may be in death as she was in life.

=== Stumpy's bear ===
After defeating the California Golden Bears in the 1929 Rose Bowl Game, Tech fullback Jack "Stumpy" Thomason acquired a live bear while in California. He brought the bear back to Tech and raised the bear in Atlanta. Named Bruin, the bear made a habit of drinking too much beer and rummaging through Midtown Atlanta dumpsters. After a lot of complaints and two arrests by local police, Stumpy agreed to cage Bruin in Bobby Dodd Stadium. Bruin left Tech campus with Stumpy when Stumpy was acquired by the Brooklyn Dodgers in 1930.

=== Drownproofing ===
From 1940 to 1987, Tech offered a class called Drownproofing, which was required for graduation for students. The class was developed by Coach Fred Lanoue for the Naval School, which was located at Georgia Tech before and during World War II. He taught students how to float in water for extended periods of time with ankles and wrists bound, how (unbound) to swim 50 yards (46 m) underwater, and other water survival skills. At the time it was considered a prime example of the difficulty of Tech's curriculum, and referred to in jest by students as "Drowning 101."

=== ANAK Society ===
The ANAK Society is said to be the only official secret society on campus. Since its founding in 1908, the ANAK Society has selected seniors who "exhibit a true love for Georgia Tech through their campus involvement and compassion for their fellow students", according to their website. While members used to be publicly selected at the semi-annual IFC dances when they were "tapped" on the shoulder, membership in the society has been secret since 1960. Only when members reach graduation are they publicly announced in The Technique. Most of the work of the society is conducted anonymously with members seeking no recognition for their service. ANAK claims to have had a hand in establishing The Technique, The Blueprint, the Student Government Association, the Ramblin' Reck Club, and Tech's peaceful integration.

== Jargon ==
=== North Avenue Trade School ===
Georgia Tech is sometimes called the "North Avenue Trade School", although this was never its official title. The name stems from the fact that the campus is bordered to the south by North Avenue, and that the school in its earlier years was operated much like a trade school, with students working part of the day in a machine shop, and the other part of the day in classrooms. Today the name is still used in a humorous manner: the campus bookstore even sells shirts bearing the name "North Avenue Trade School."

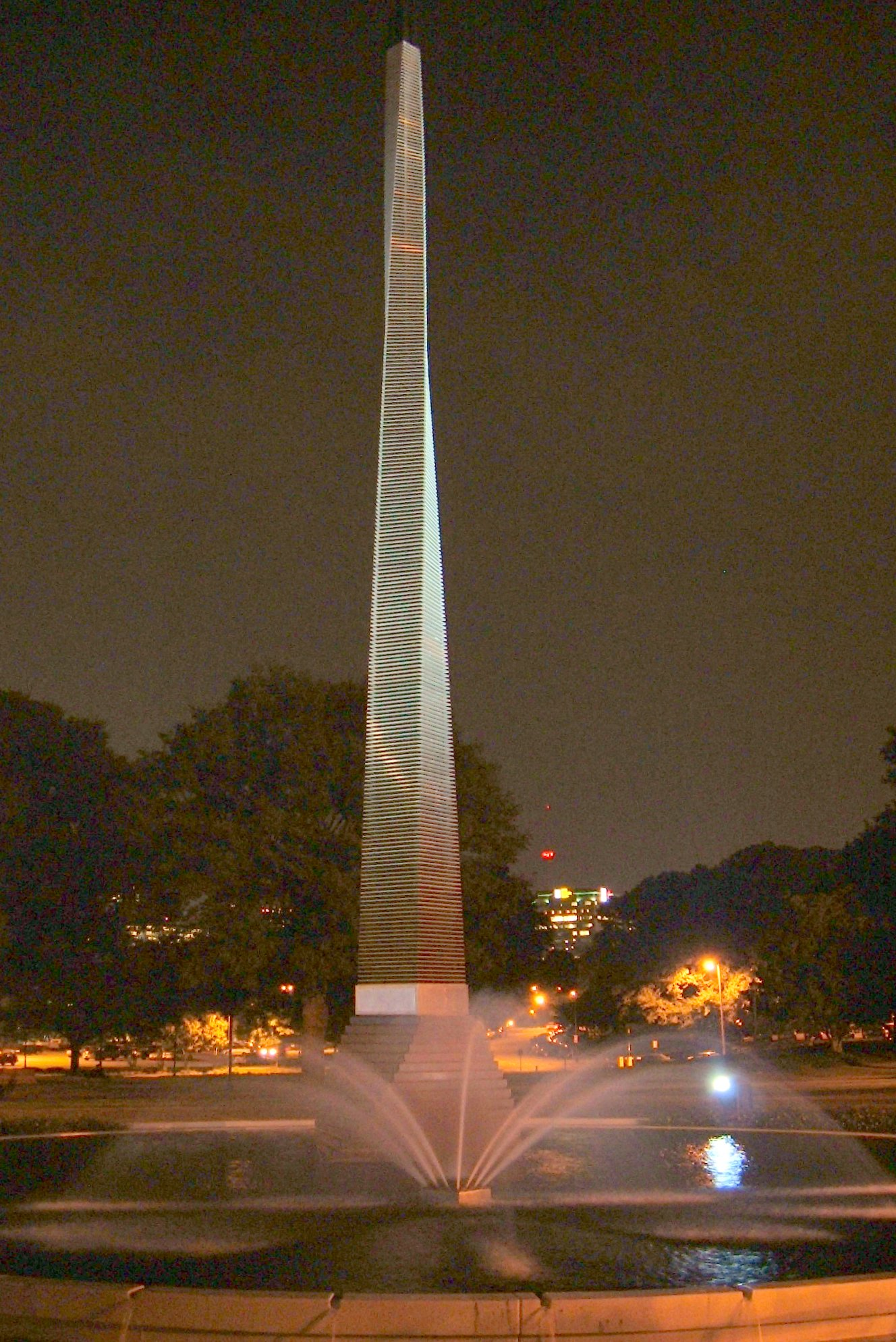
"The Shaft"

=== The Institute ===
Traditionally, Georgia Tech has been called "the Institute" while discouraging the nicknames "the university" or "the college". The Institute had been divided into "schools" which are now called "colleges" for each field of study. When Georgia Tech's football team played the University of Miami for its 2006 Homecoming game, several students were seen wearing gold T-shirts that said, "Screw the U, Fear the I!" (mocking Miami's tradition of being called the U).

The Georgia Institute of Technology is one of only five Division I Bowl Subdivision football programs without "University" in the school's name. The others are Boston College and the three service academies (United States Air Force Academy, United States Military Academy and the United States Naval Academy).

=== Getting shafted ===
"Getting shafted" generally refers to being harmed (by an instructor) via unfair academic procedures, like via an unnecessarily difficult or impossible to pass test. The physical manifestation of this phrase is the Kessler Campanile, a "shaft-like" structure near the Student Center. The phallic shape of the structure invites its designation as a shafting device.

=== The Ratio, The Odds, and TBS ===
The Ratio (always capitalized) refers to Georgia Tech's traditionally high ratio of male to female students.

Many students replace the lyric "to cheer on the brave and bold" with "to raise The Ratio" from the section "Oh! If I had a daughter, sir, I'd dress her in White and Gold, And put her on the campus to cheer the brave and bold" of "Ramblin' Wreck from Georgia Tech" when singing at various Georgia Tech events.

Due to The Ratio, some students have felt that certain women at Georgia Tech may be stuck up because of all the attention they get from an overwhelming number of males. These students call the behavior of the female in this scenario as "tech bitch syndrome" or "TBS" for short. Women against the term claim that they are often labeled it without warrant. An analysis by Georgia Tech's Sexual Violence and Prevention Initiative found that the term represents male hostility and disrespect towards women.

The Odds (always capitalized) refers to the saying that "the odds are good, but the goods are odd" in reference to the interactions and expectations of social engagement from men with women on campus.

=== The Hill ===
A nickname given to Tech's academic administration and historic district. Topographically, Tech's first administrative buildings were built on an actual hill in Atlanta. As campus expanded onto surrounding lower terrain, the Hill became a much more prominent sight on campus. The term now is typically used in derision when referring to the administration. Former Tech Interim President Gary Schuster's blog, titled "Notes from the Hill", refers to this nickname.

The Hill also refers to the steep incline of Bobby Dodd Way (which most students now refer to as "Freshman Hill"), which residents of East Campus must trek up in order to attend class. The climb is often referred to as a hike up the Freshman Hill as many freshman dorms are located around the bottom of Freshman Hill.

=== Ma Tech ===
An affectionate name used by students and alumni for their Alma Mater.

=== Getting out ===
"Getting out" refers to graduating from Georgia Tech. Graduates typically say "I got out" rather than that they graduated from Georgia Tech due to the school's highly rigorous academic culture.

== See also ==
- History of Georgia Tech
