= Tech Tower =

Historic building of the Georgia Institute of Technology

Lettie Pate Whitehead Evans Administration Building
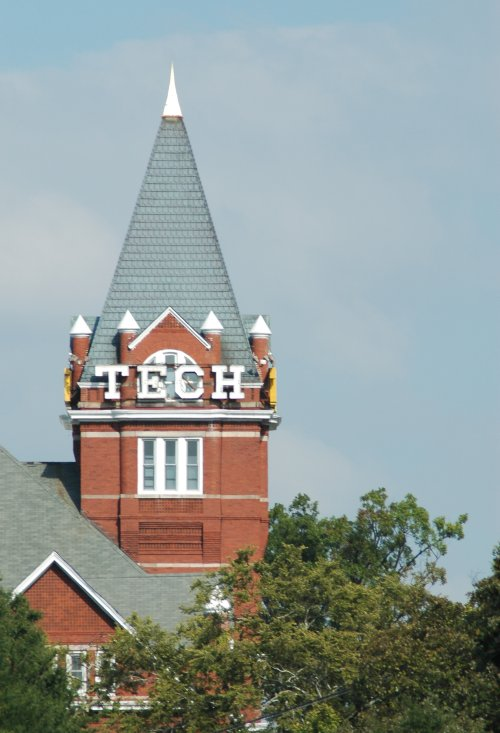
- Exterior in 2004
- Former names: Administration Building; Academic Building

General information
- Architectural style: Victorian and Romanesque Revival
- Location: Atlanta, Georgia, United States, 225 North Avenue NW
- Coordinates: 33°46′20.6″N 84°23′41.0″W
- Current tenants: Administration
- Construction started: June 1887
- Completed: September 1888
- Owner: Georgia Institute of Technology

Dimensions
- Other dimensions: 130 ft (40 m) wide 120 feet deep

Technical details
- Floor count: 4 (main complex); 7 (tower)

Design and construction
- Architect: Bruce & Morgan
- Main contractor: Angus McGilvray
- Tech Tower
- U.S. Historic district – Contributing property
- Part of: Georgia Institute of Technology Historic District (ID78000983)
- Added to NRHP: October 25, 1978

The Lettie Pate Whitehead Evans Administration Building, commonly known as Tech Tower, is a historic building and focal point of the central campus of the Georgia Institute of Technology (Georgia Tech) in Atlanta, Georgia, United States.

Located at 225 North Avenue NW in Midtown Atlanta, it was erected in 1888 as the Academic Building, with classrooms to complement the hands-on training in the adjacent shop building. It was the second edifice completed on the Georgia Tech campus and it is the oldest surviving one.

Tech Tower has achieved local, cultural, and historical significance. Monuments and plaques commemorating philanthropy towards Georgia Tech adorn the building and surrounding landscape. The red brick, Victorian-style building is the architectural anchor of the Georgia Institute of Technology Historic District, a landmark of tradition and school spirit, and the present-day administrative hub of the institute. It has been the site of many ceremonies and important events, including a visit by U.S. President Theodore Roosevelt and its dedication in honor of Lettie Pate Whitehead Evans, "Tech's greatest benefactor."

Lighted signs spelling TECH hang on each of the four sides of the seven-story central tower, dominating the building's facade and visible from many parts of the Georgia Tech campus and surrounding area. Georgia Tech students have several times stolen the letter 'T' from one of these signs, a prank once tolerated but now strictly forbidden.

== History ==
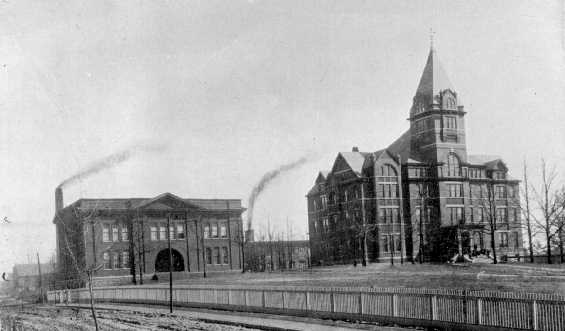
An early photograph of the new Shop Building (left) and Tech Tower (right), c. 1899

In 1887, the state of Georgia acquired 9 acres (3.6 ha) of land from Atlanta pioneer Richard Peters that would form the original campus of what was then called the Georgia School of Technology, as well as the site of its first two structures. The state hired the well-known architectural firm Bruce & Morgan to design an Academic Building, containing "ample accommodations in halls, offices, apparatus rooms, recitation and lecture rooms, free hand and mechanical drawing rooms, library and chapel," as well as a Shop Building, in which "boiler and engine rooms, wood shop, machine shop, forge room and foundry" were located.

Both buildings boasted towers and edifices of similar design. The complementary names and purposes of these buildings reflected the School's founding principles of valuing both theory and practice, while their similar appearance emphasized the equal standing of these principles. Construction work, contracted by Angus McGilvray with his low bid of US$43,250 ($ 1.55 million in 2025), began with the Academic Building in June 1887; the building was completed in September 1888. The Shop Building, completed shortly afterward, was destroyed by fire in 1892 and rebuilt more modestly without a tower. Following this, the Academic Building, later known as Tech Tower, became the oldest building on the Georgia Tech campus, a distinction it continues to hold more than a century later.

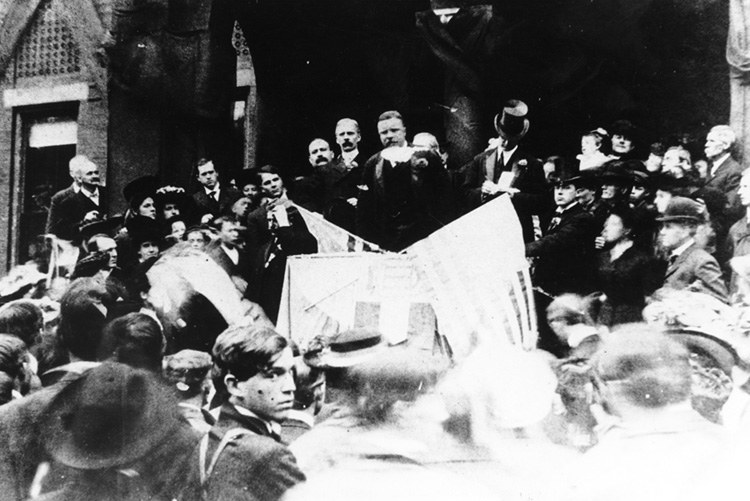
Theodore Roosevelt speaks on the steps of Tech Tower.

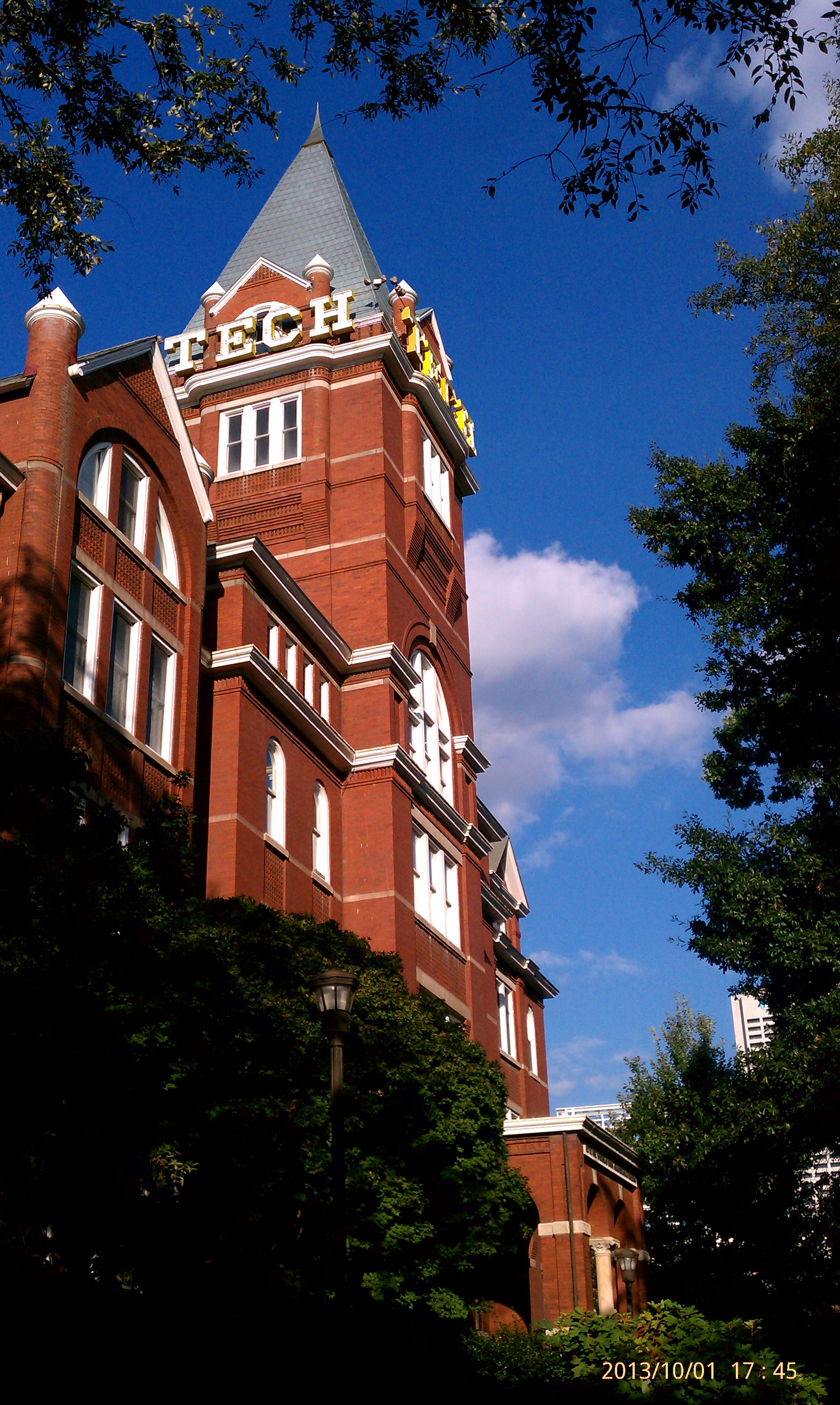
Tech Tower

On October 20, 1905, U.S. President Theodore Roosevelt visited the Georgia Tech campus. On the steps of Tech Tower, Roosevelt presented a speech about the importance of engineering education. He then shook hands with each of the 500 students present.

Georgia Tech's Class of 1922 installed the famous TECH signs on all four sides of Tech Tower in 1918, giving rise to the building's present nickname. Their purpose, as defined by the donors during their first year at Georgia Tech, was to "light the spirit of Tech to the four points of the compass." The signs were originally made of wood and painted white and gold – the Institute colors. In the 1930s, lightbulbs were affixed to the signs to illuminate them more effectively than the earlier ground-based spotlights. In 1949, the TECH signs were supplemented by neon lighting in metal frames.

In 1978, Tech Tower and the surrounding 9 acres (3.6 ha) of the original campus were added to the National Register of Historic Places as the Georgia Institute of Technology Historic District. Near the entrance to Tech Tower, a Georgia historical marker maintained by the Georgia Historical Society commemorates this listing as well as the early history of the Georgia Tech campus.

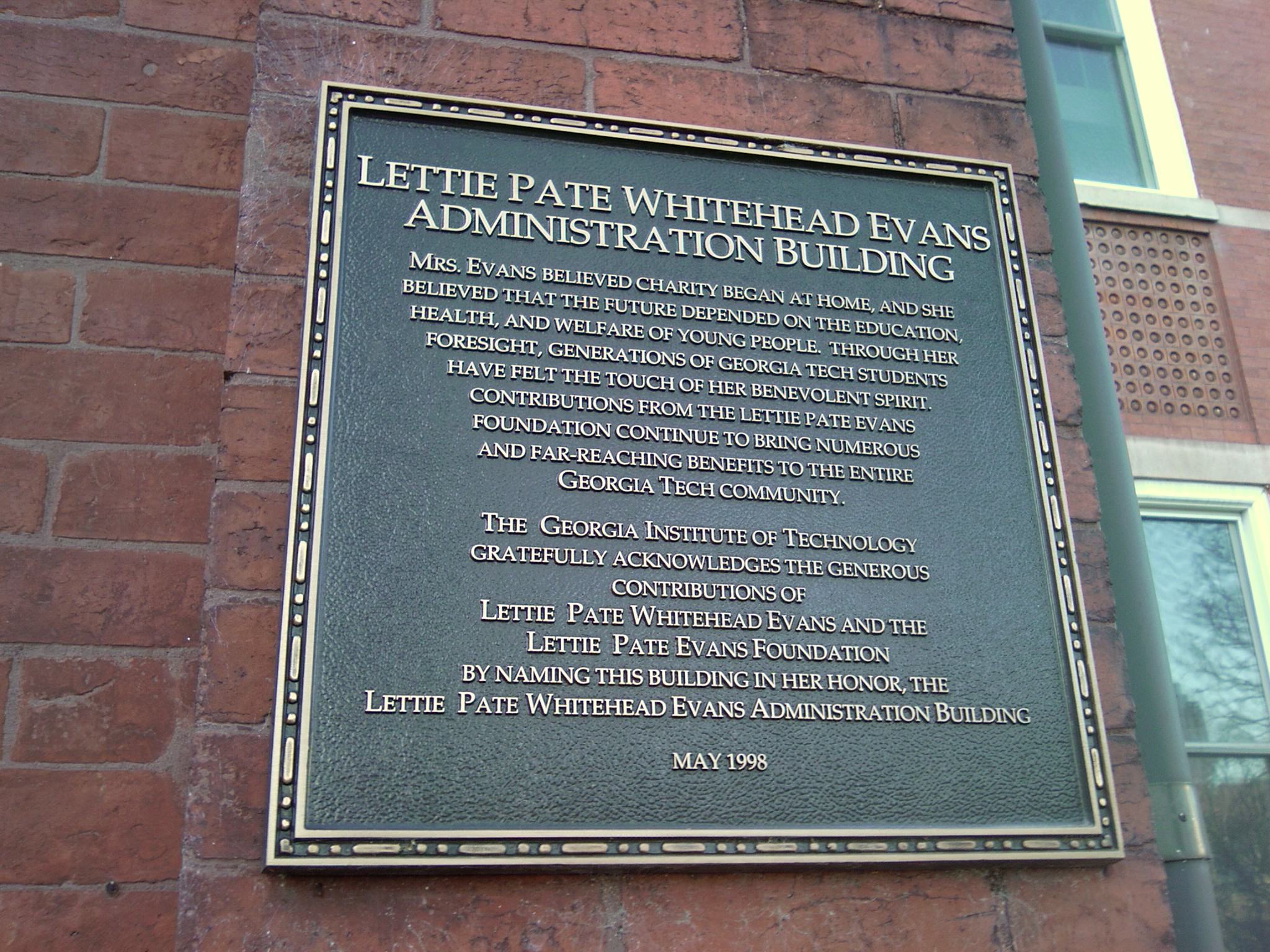
A plaque near the front doors of Tech Tower recognizes the building's eponymous benefactor, Lettie Pate Whitehead Evans.

On May 22, 1998, Tech Tower was officially renamed the Lettie Pate Whitehead Evans Administration Building in a ceremony presided over by Tech president G. Wayne Clough. Although neither she nor her husbands attended Georgia Tech as a student, Lettie Pate Whitehead Evans was a longtime benefactor of the institute, contributing over $340 million through her philanthropic organization, the Lettie Pate Evans Foundation.

Tech Tower's continuous use since its completion in 1888 has required occasional maintenance and refurbishment. It underwent extensive renovations in 1965 with a focus on remodeling the building's interior layout. During this time, the library and chapel were replaced with modern office space and furnishings. In contrast, efforts directed towards the exterior of the building have aimed to preserve its historic appearance. A restoration project called the "Tech Tower Renovation" began in 1987, spearheaded by alumnus Eugene M. "Gene" Clary's gift of new copper shingles with which to replace Tech Tower's aging roof tiles. Clary first suggested gold-colored shingles, but John Patrick Crecine, Georgia Tech's president at the time, insisted on copper shingles to match the building's original construction materials. One of these shingles and a small marker inside the Tech Tower entrance lobby commemorate Clary and his donation. Additional restoration of Tech Tower's exterior and the Georgia Institute of Technology Historic District, funded by the Class of 1950 and Class of 1975, began in 2000. As part of Phase I of the Georgia Tech Master Plan of 1997, the area was made "more pedestrian-friendly" with the removal of access roads and the addition of landscaping improvements, benches, and other facilities. Further renovations to Tech Tower were completed during 2015–2016, which cost $7.5 million, and addressed fire, safety, and accessibility issues. These renovations were designed to improve occupant safety and comfort and also improve building energy efficiency.

== Structure and appearance ==
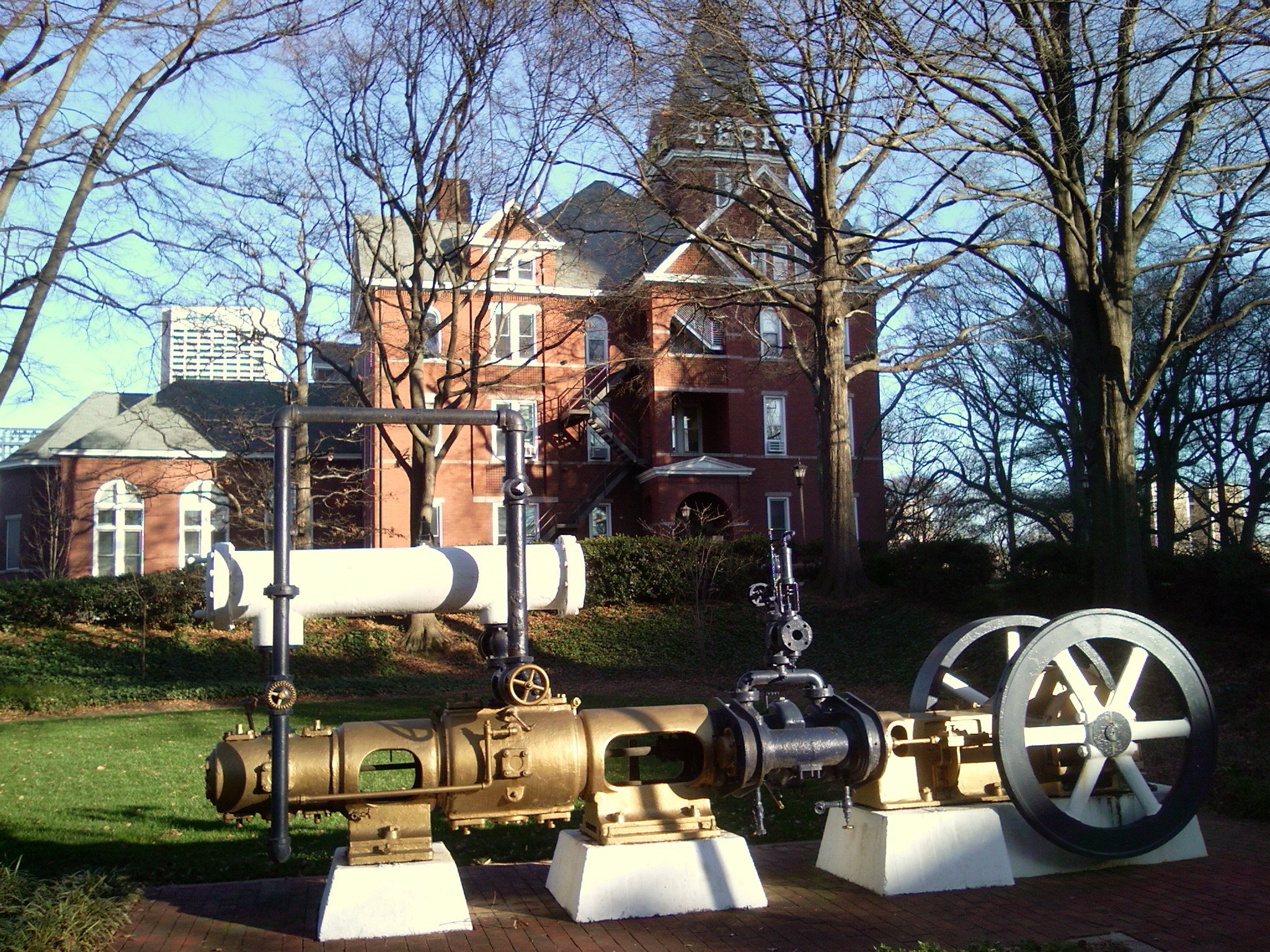
The "steam engine," a steam-driven air compressor on Cherry Street, with Tech Tower in the background

Tech Tower is built in the Victorian style with Romanesque Revival influences. The building's original specifications, according to Georgia Tech's first Annual Catalogue Announcement published in 1889, are listed as 130 ft (40 m) wide and 120 ft (37 m) deep. It is constructed primarily of red brick and trimmed with granite. The gabled roof, originally terra cotta, was later replaced by copper shingles. The main complex of the building stands four stories high plus a basement. The tower portion stands seven stories high and is topped with four lighted TECH signs (one on each side) and a high pitched roof. The main entrance to the building is accessed by ascending a small staircase and entering a small porch which forms the base of Tech Tower. Most of the building's windows are simple rectangular frames, with the exception of those on the third floor, which are arched. The entire complex sits on the crest of a tree-dotted hill, giving it the appearance of being larger than it actually is.

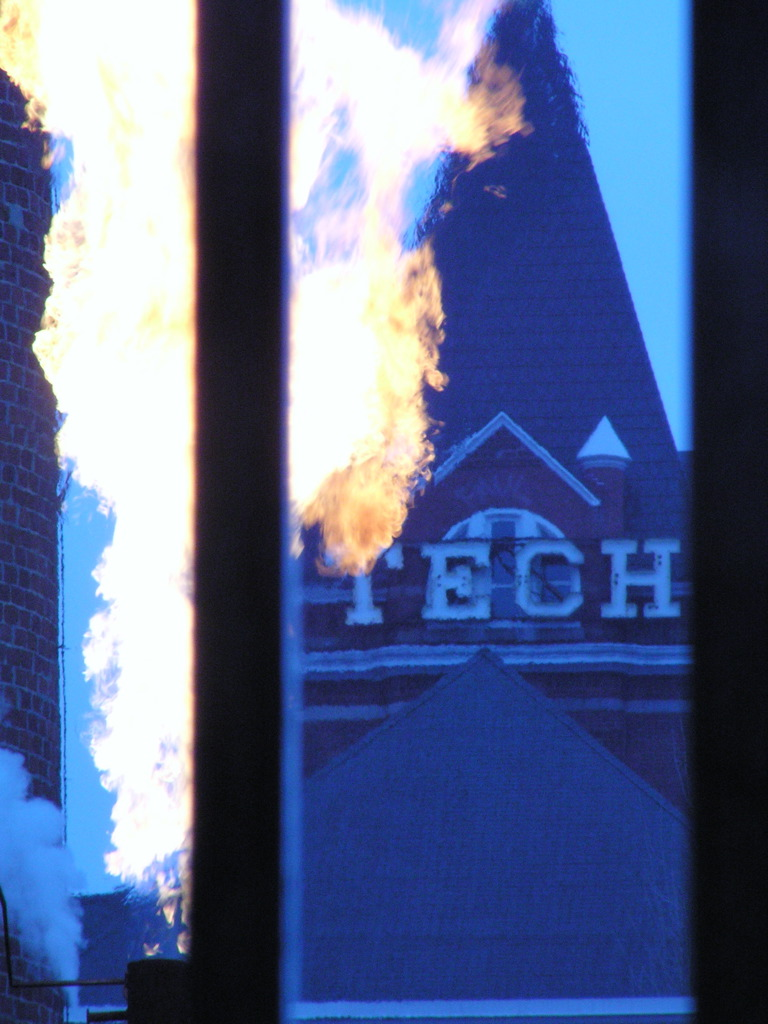
The Whistle and Tech Tower

=== Surroundings ===
As the oldest building on the Georgia Tech campus, Tech Tower has accumulated a number of peripheral monuments and sites of interest over the years. Two walkways encircle the building, including the Tower Walk, donated by the Class of 1950 in 2000. Georgia Tech's first class memorial, a marble drinking fountain, was donated in 1911 by the Class of 1903 and is situated east of Tech Tower's main entrance. Also near the main entrance to Tech Tower is a marbled pair of benches donated by the Class of 1925 in memory of those who died in World War I. A few feet away stands a marbled bench memorial to Paul Howes Norcross, a 1902 Georgia Tech alumnus and former ASCE president who perished in the Norman boat disaster of May 8, 1925. The headstone of Sideways the dog is located near Tech Tower's rear entrance, as is an informational placard detailing Tech Tower's early history, donated by the Class of 1932. A staircase donated by the ANAK Society in 1921 connects Tech Tower to the adjacent D. P. Savant Building via a continuous sidewalk. Finally, a steam-driven air compressor, colloquially known as the "steam engine," sits prominently at the top of the hill near Tech Tower as a reminder of the school's industrial roots.

== Modern use ==
The logo of the Ivan Allen College of Liberal Arts features a stylized version of Tech Tower and the Kessler Campanile.

As its official name suggests, Tech Tower is primarily used for administrative purposes. It houses the Office of the Registrar, the Office of Capital Planning and Space Management (CPSM), the Internal Auditing Department, and offices for the Center for the Enhancement of Teaching and Learning (CETL). In addition, the deans of the College of Engineering and the College of Sciences have offices in Tech Tower.

Tech Tower is considered an iconic representation of Georgia Tech and of higher education in Atlanta. It is often featured in marketing materials and merchandise for the Institute and its silhouette is recognized throughout the Atlanta metropolitan area. The Tower, Georgia Tech's undergraduate research journal, is named after Tech Tower. Kessler Campanile, a stylized bell tower built on the Georgia Tech campus as part of an Institute-wide branding campaign in the mid-1990s, was designed to look like a modernized version of Tech Tower. The campanile is now featured in all Georgia Tech logos, though some have argued that Tech Tower itself would be a more appropriate symbol.

== Stealing the 'T' ==
Students have stolen the huge, symbolic letter 'T' on the Tech Tower's TECH signs a number of times. The 'T' is then returned at the halftime of the homecoming football game, and the students' achievement celebrated. Tradition dictates that the first 'T' to be stolen should be the one facing east, as this can most easily be seen from the Downtown Connector. The groups of students responsible for 'T' thefts generally assume dramatic pseudonyms, such as the "Mystic Marauders" or the "Sneaky Four." Pervasive rumors of a detailed plan held in the institute's archives to execute "the perfect T theft," crafted by an unnamed Georgia Tech fraternity, are apparently spurious.

=== Notable thefts ===
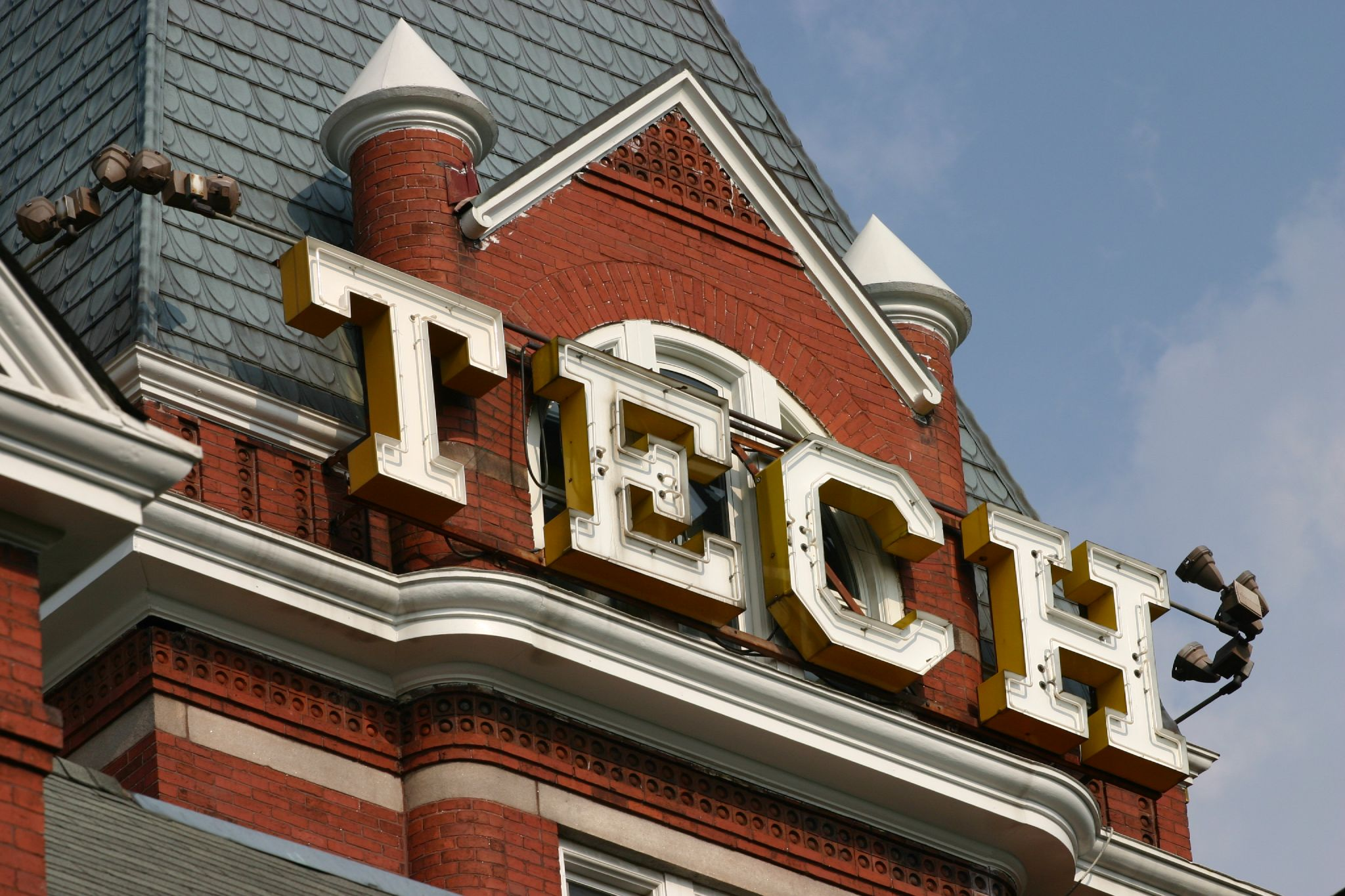
A closeup of Tech Tower's iconic TECH signage

The 'T' was first stolen in April 1969 by a secret group of Georgia Tech fraternity brothers calling themselves the "Magnificent Seven". Inspired by a similar prank that had taken place in 1968 at Harvard University, the students planned the theft as a means of commemorating Institute President Edwin D. Harrison's retirement. The 'T' was returned several days later via helicopter at the behest of Atlanta mayor Ivan Allen.

A high point of the celebration came when Tech students unveiled and presented to Harrison a 5 ft-tall (1.5 m) T – a part of the four Tech signs around the top of the administration building that had mysteriously disappeared the preceding week – so that he would have what every Tech man needed, his own glowing yellow T for a conversation piece.

On the evening of November 6, 1997, the 'T's were nearly stolen from the north, south and west sides of Tech Tower by five students wielding hacksaws, tin snips, and rappelling equipment. The students were caught by Georgia Tech police acting on a tip provided by an anonymous informant. The stolen north 'T' was recovered in the back of a blue Ford Explorer that was parked at the Copper Kettle on Howell Mill Road, also in response to an anonymous tip. Each student was required to pay $2,446.75 in damages ($ 4,907 in 2025) although criminal charges were not filed. The Georgia Tech Office of Facilities reinstalled the 'T' on January 31, 1998, 87 days after its attempted theft.

One of the most theatrical thefts of the 'T' occurred over the summer of 1999. The 'T' on the north face of Tech Tower was stolen by a group of "six or seven people" on the morning of June 3, 1999. The perpetrators wrote a letter detailing the theft to the editorial staff of The Technique, Georgia Tech's student newspaper. The letter, an abridged version of which was subsequently printed in the summer issue of The Technique, described the process of stealing the 'T' by lowering it via a rope and moving it to a secret location. The letter also included a photograph of the 'T' "on vacation" in Berkeley Springs, West Virginia. Finally, the perpetrators indicated plans to return the 'T' during the Georgia Tech Homecoming Parade, according to tradition, as long as no criminal charges would be brought against them. The letter was signed by fictitious Georgia Tech alumnus George P. Burdell. However, the Institute released a notice that those who stole the 'T' would be harshly punished, and therefore the 'T' remains to this day at an undisclosed location.

The replacement 'T' on the north face of Tech Tower was stolen on May 28, 2001, by three students, two of whom were found guilty of numerous conduct code violations by the Undergraduate Judiciary Cabinet and subsequently suspended. The students had successfully removed the 'T' from its mount but were caught in the act by authorities when the removal triggered an alarm. In October 2005, a replica of the 'T' was stolen from the Student Services Building and returned two days later.

Around midday on March 18, 2014, it was discovered that the north-facing 'T' had been stolen from Tech Tower. In this case, the thief admitted guilt after detectives approached him at his residence that afternoon, and was suspended through the following summer, while also having to pay a restitution fee and tuition to retake his nearly completed Spring 2014 classes. To handle this financial burden, the restitution fee alone totaling $14,823.98, a GoFundMe was created by a friend of the thief that was well known on campus, to assure its legitimacy, without revealing the thief's identity (the friend's name has since been removed from the post because of negative pressure from the GT administration).

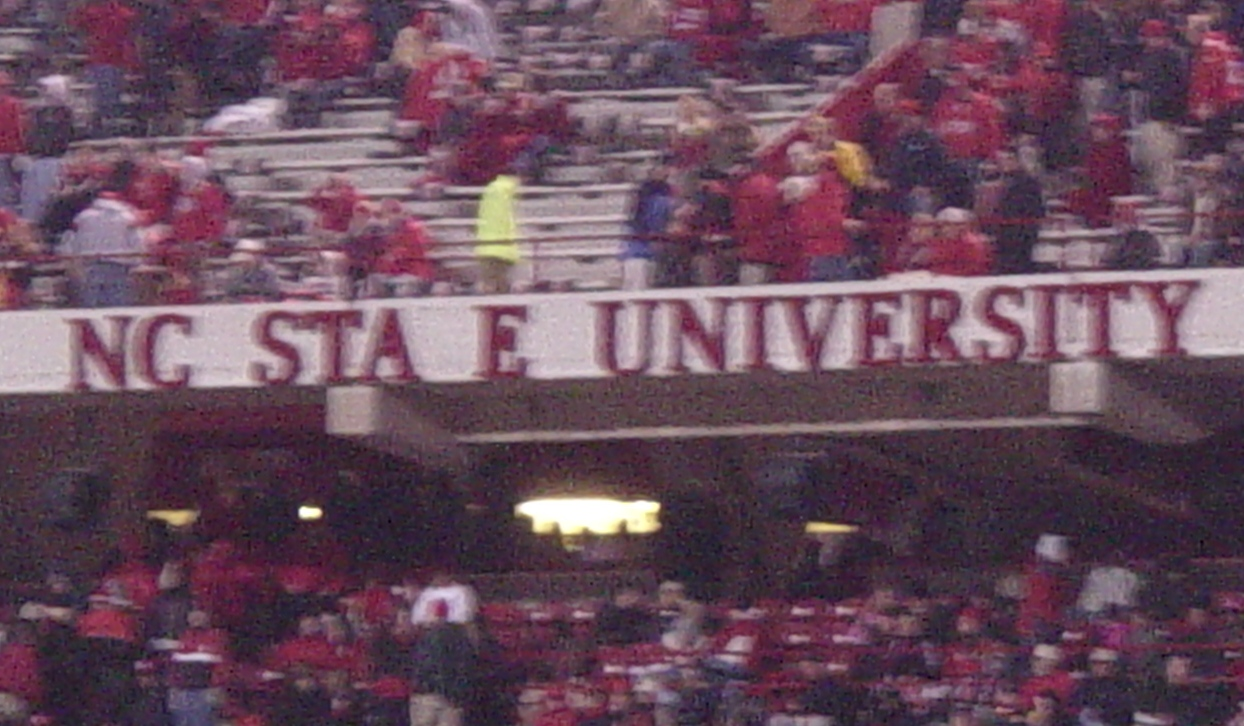
A 'T' goes missing during the 2006 GT–NC State football game.

The tradition of stealing the 'T' from Tech Tower has inspired copycat crimes involving other signage. During a Georgia Tech–NC State football game on November 4, 2006, the second 'T' from a large nc state university banner mysteriously vanished from the upper deck of Carter–Finley Stadium where it had been hanging. It was widely assumed across the Tech campus that the prank was pulled off by a group of Georgia Tech students in an homage to the longstanding Tech Tower tradition; however, it is possible that the T in the banner came loose and fell to the stands below. Another copy cat incident occurred some time after the 2012 football game with Virginia Tech when vandals, believed to be Yellow Jacket fans, pried a T off of the sign in front of Virginia Tech's Lane Stadium. The 'T' was later dropped off at night to the Georgia Tech Police Department. The Georgia Tech president returned it to the Virginia Tech president in September 2012 along with an apology.

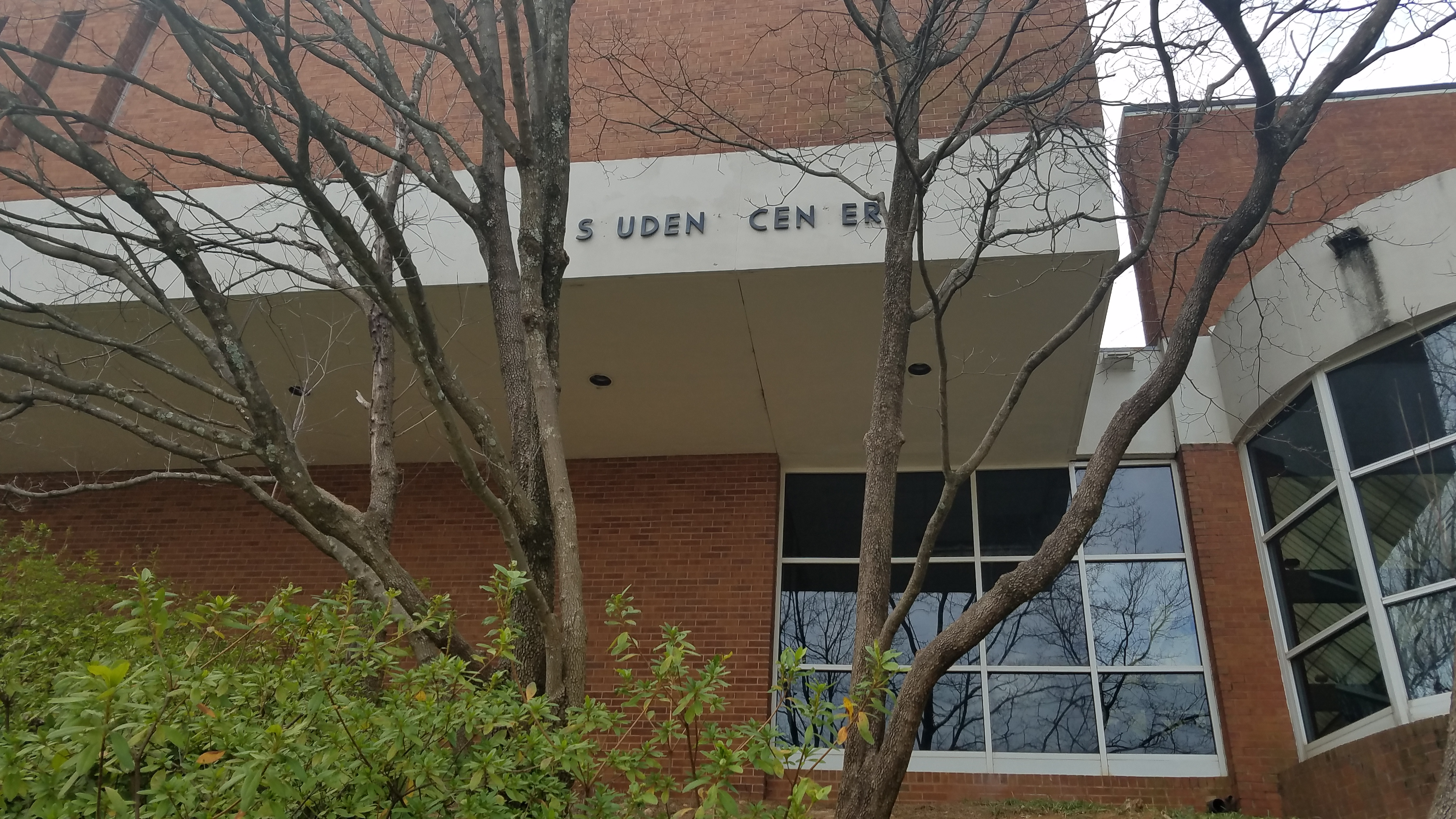
Sign for the Student Center at Georgia Tech with the Ts stolen

Similar copycat crimes have occurred on the Georgia Tech campus. In late 2001, a group of Georgia Tech students calling itself the "Caldwell Liberation Army" stole 32 'T's from signs on 16 campus buildings over a period of two nights. The students, who were not caught, vandalized the signs to express their bitterness at being displaced from Caldwell Residence Hall while renovations were taking place. In February 2006, it was noticed that small vinyl 'T' stickers were being stolen from informational signs located around the Georgia Tech campus, creating confusion for visitors and new students. According to the Georgia Tech Student Government Association (SGA), 'T' thefts across campus cost the Institute over $100,000 from 2010 to 2011. The SGA discouraged these thefts, which they emphasized did not constitute a true Georgia Tech tradition: "The tradition is stealing the 'T' from Tech Tower – no other 'T's were ever a part of this tradition." The campaign drew national press coverage.

=== Institute reaction ===
Georgia Tech Facilities repairs the 'T' after 2001 attempt.

The Georgia Tech administration's position on stealing the 'T' from Tech Tower has varied over the years. When the 'T' was first stolen in 1969, interim Institute President Vernon Crawford was so upset he considered canceling classes until it was returned. Afterwards, subsequent presidents opted to turn a blind eye to the practice, with one president, John Patrick Crecine, going so far as to endorse it.

I think stealing the 'T' off the Tech Tower is among the all-time greatest rituals.

Today, stealing the 'T' is prohibited and is officially punishable with expulsion, although this has not happened in practice. After a Georgia Tech visitor was accidentally killed while climbing the Alexander Memorial Coliseum in 1999, Institute President G. Wayne Clough banned stealing of the 'T' and the climbing of any Institute building, due to the risk of fatal falls and the potential for damage to the building. Clough also expressed concern over the "incredibly expensive liability litigation" Georgia Tech could face in the event of an accident. To discourage climbing, security features such as pressure-sensitive roof tiling, fiber optic cabling running throughout the letters, and an audible alarm have been added to the 'T' to help prevent its theft.

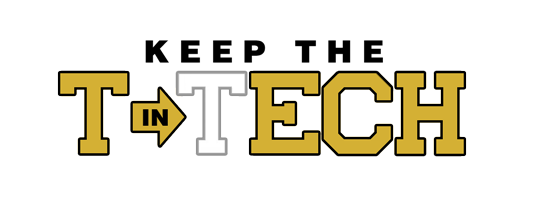
Logo for "Keep the 'T' in Tech" campaign

In 2011, the Georgia Tech Student Government Association (SGA) launched a "Keep the 'T' in Tech" campaign to discourage thefts of 'T's from signage around the campus. The week-long campaign took place from September 26–30 and included an online petition to be published in The Technique, an open forum for discussing the issue, an amnesty day for returning stolen 'T's, and "Live the True Tradition," an evening event focused on the tradition of stealing the 'T' from Tech Tower.

== See also ==
- History of Georgia Tech
- Georgia Institute of Technology Historic District
