= George C. Griffin =

American educational dean

- Griffin, c. 1967
- Born: 1897; Savannah, Georgia
- Died: 1990 (age 93)
- Occupation: Dean of Men

George C. Griffin (1897–1990) served in various positions at his alma mater, the Georgia Institute of Technology, most notably as dean of men from 1946 to 1964. He was known variously as "the best friend of all Tech men" and "Mr. Georgia Tech."

== Biography ==
=== Student ===
Griffin was born in Savannah, Georgia, and attended Tech from 1914 to 1918. He signed up to serve in World War I; he then attended from 1920 to 1922, receiving a degree in civil engineering in 1922. Griffin was part of the Tech team that is known for the biggest rout in college or professional football, against Cumberland University. Griffin carried the ball four times for 56 yards and two touchdowns. He was a member of Pi Kappa Phi fraternity.

=== Faculty ===
In addition to his other roles, Griffin served as a math instructor, assistant football coach, and coach of tennis, track, and cross-country during his career. He would later serve as "placement officer, alumni club ambassador, emergency loan officer for students, raconteur, recruiter, and any other job that needed doing."

From the 1920s to his retirement in the 1980s, many students utilized Griffin's "Hip Pocket Fund," an unofficial loan slush fund financed by area businessmen. "Instead of sending the money back to where it came from, he would dole it out again to whomever he had on his waiting list," allowing the program to become a sort of need-based scholarship. As assistant dean of men, Griffin established a central placement office in the early 1930s.

=== Dean of men ===
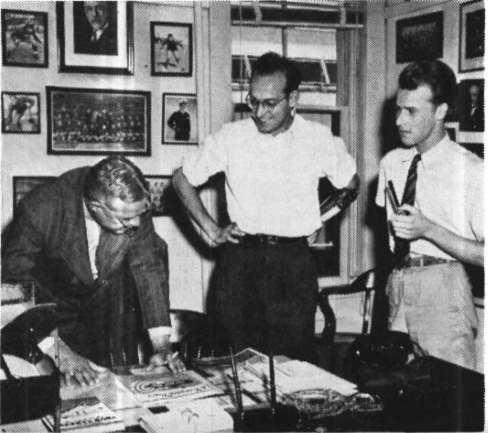
Griffin (left) with two students, c. 1950

In March 1941, Griffin was called to active duty as a captain in the Naval Reserve during World War II and was temporarily replaced by Fred W. Ajax. Griffin became dean of men when Floyd Field retired from the position on July 1, 1946. In a subsequent reorganization of the institute by Blake R. Van Leer, Griffin was given the duties of "the coordination of religious affairs, the YMCA, the infirmary, and campus director of health." Griffin earned a master's degree in industrial management in 1957.

Griffin was a popular speaker and wrote a book entitled Griffin, you are a great disappointment to me. The title is from the following anecdote:

Once while walking on North Avenue, Heisman called to one of his players, George Griffin, to cross the street. "Griffin, you are a great disappointment to me," Heisman said. When Griffin asked why, Heisman replied, "Well, I always expect you to get away for a long run, but you never do."

== Legacy ==
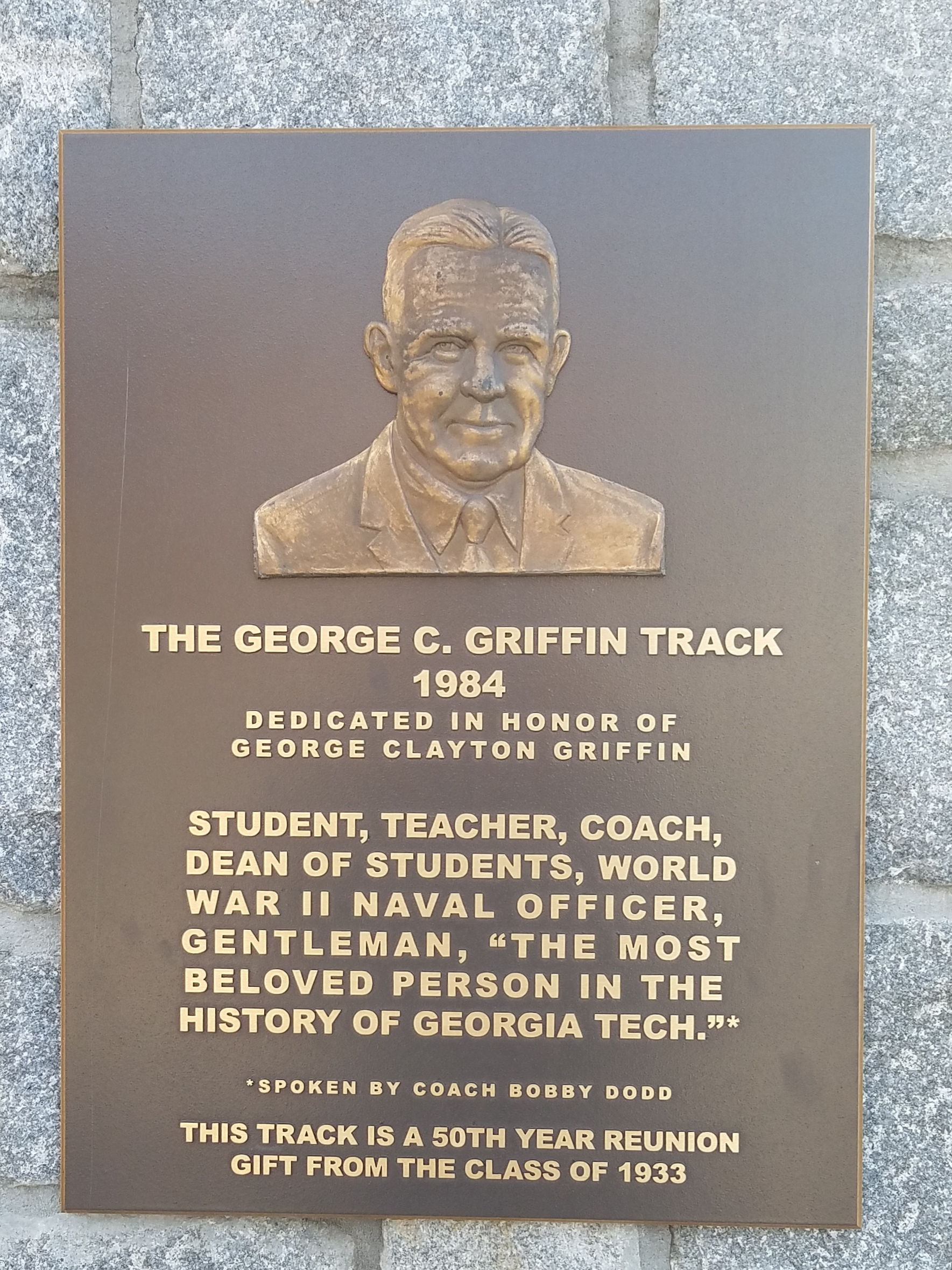
Plaque commemorating the George C. Griffin Track

Griffin received numerous awards and honors. Most notably, several places and events were named after him, including the "Student Galleria" (which consists of the Student Services Building, the Ferst Center for the Arts and the plaza connecting them) and a track arena. He received the 1955 Alumni Distinguished Service Award and was posthumously inducted into the Pi Kappa Phi Hall of Fame. Upon his retirement, there was a celebration and Georgia Governor Carl Sanders declared May 16, 1964, to be "Dean George Griffin Day." "Dean George Griffin Day" was celebrated again on May 14, 1999. The Pi Mile Road Race was named after him in honor of his tenure as a track and cross country coach.
