= Edwin D. Harrison =

American university administrator (1916–2001)

- Harrison, c. 1967
- Born: January 8, 1916
- Died: October 23, 2001 (aged 85)
- Occupation: University president

Edwin Davies Harrison (January 8, 1916 – October 23, 2001) was the sixth president of the Georgia Institute of Technology (Georgia Tech), from 1957 to 1969. It was in Harrison's honor that the first 'T' was stolen from the face of Tech Tower. His administration also tackled the difficult issues of integration and competitive pay for faculty members.

== Early life and education ==
Harrison graduated from the U.S. Naval Academy in 1939 and served in the Navy until 1945. He then earned a master's in mechanical engineering from Virginia Polytechnic Institute in 1948, and a doctorate in mechanical engineering from Purdue University in 1952.

== Career ==
Harrison was Assistant Dean at Virginia Tech and Dean of Engineering at the University of Toledo.

Previous Georgia Tech president Blake Ragsdale Van Leer had died in office during a political battle with the state's governor, and interim dean Paul Weber had served for nearly 17 months while the institute searched for a president that was willing to serve in the harsh social climate. Harrison would oversee another large expansion from Georgia Tech. Georgia Tech's President G. Wayne Clough was a student while Harrison was president.

After his abrupt retirement from Georgia Tech after ten years as president, Harrison worked for J.P. Stevens (now part of WestPoint Home) for seven years and subsequently retired.

== See also ==
- History of Georgia Tech#Integration and expansion
