= Kessler Campanile =

Georgia Institute of Technology bell tower

Coordinates: 33°46′27″N 84°23′54″W

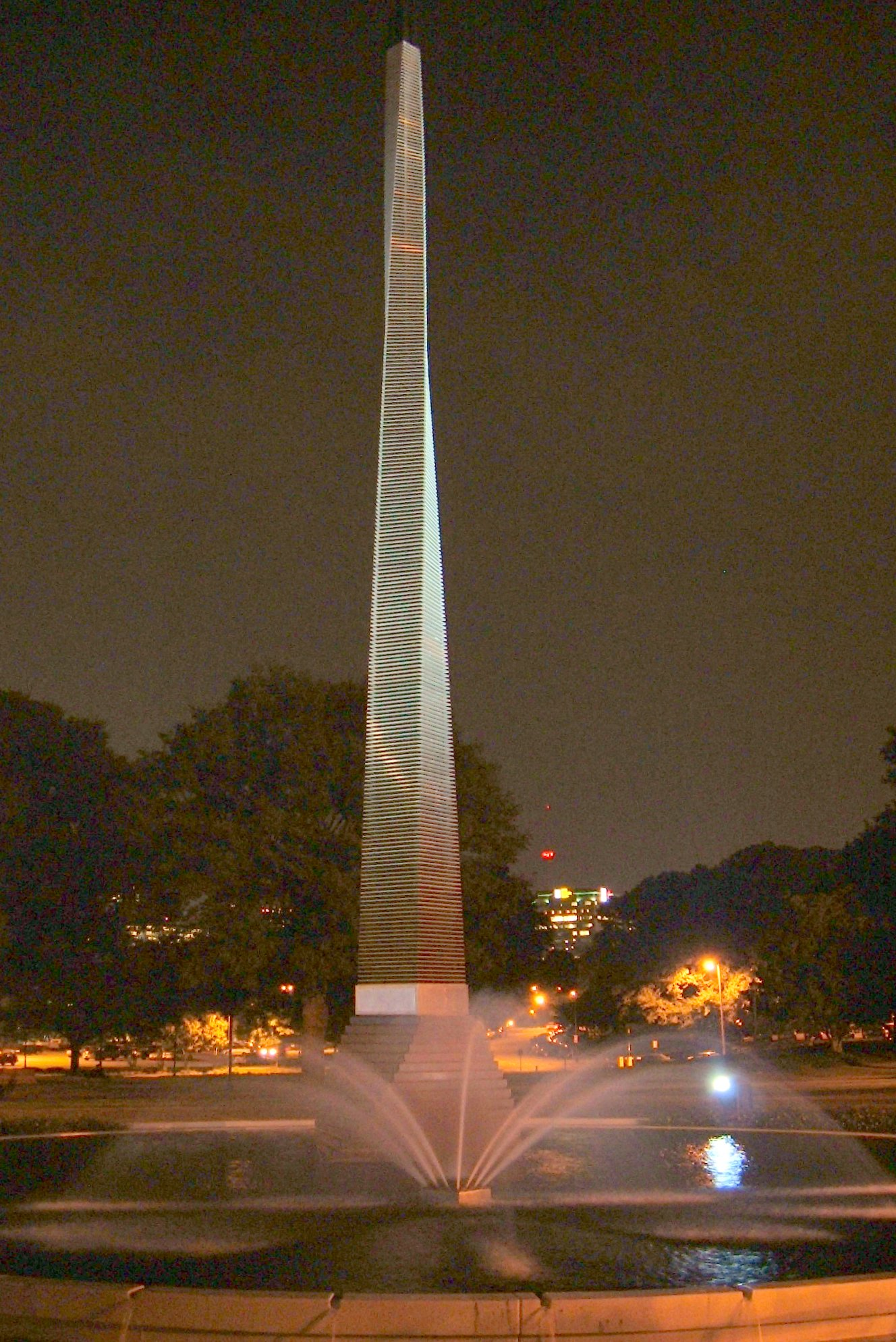
The Kessler Campanile illuminated at night.

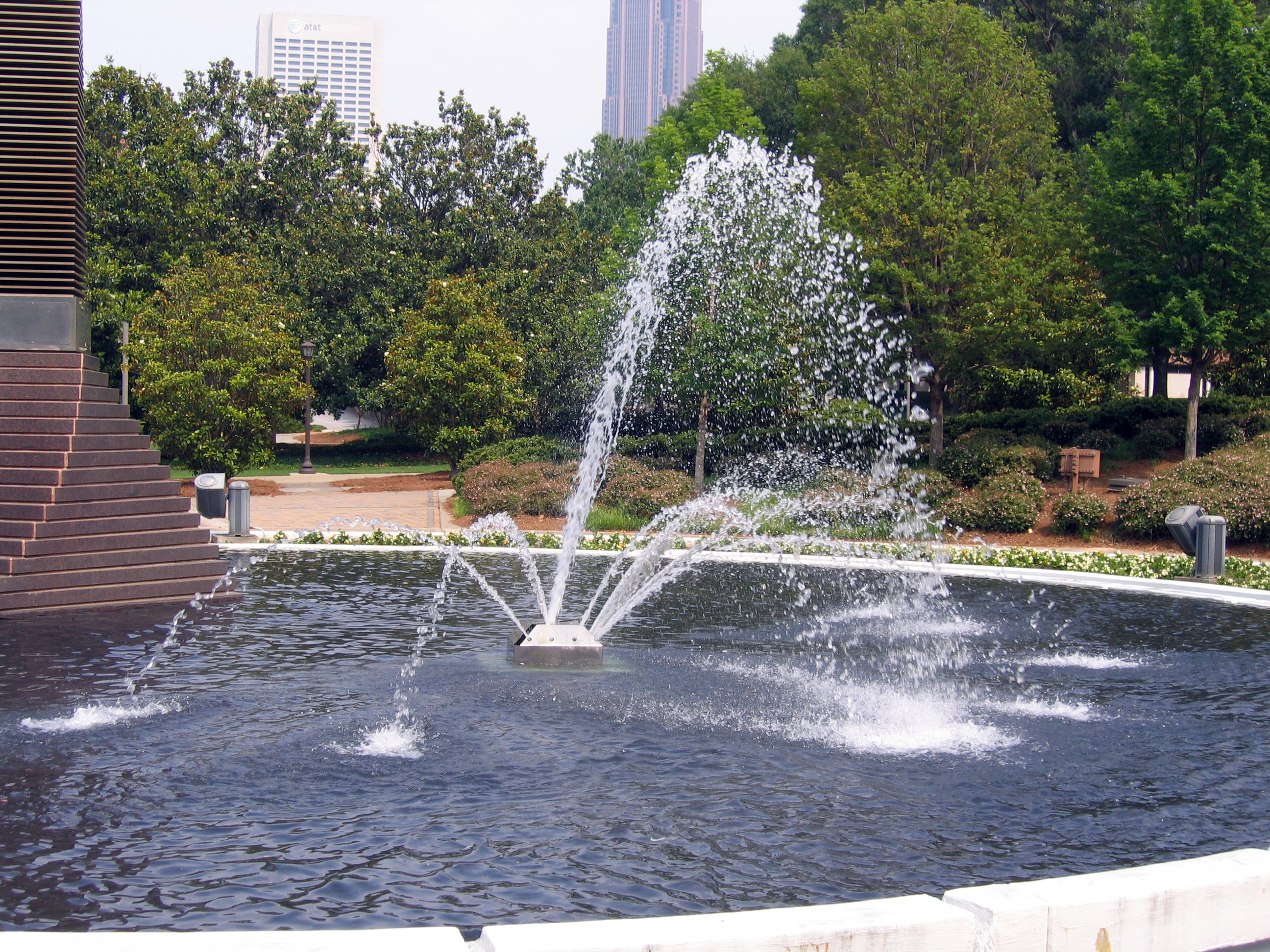

The Kessler Campanile is an 80-foot-tall (24 m) campanile located at the Georgia Institute of Technology. Designed by artist Richard Hill, a University of Georgia graduate, it was originally constructed for the 1996 Olympic Games. It is named after Richard C. Kessler, Tech graduate and former head of Days Inns. It is frequently referred to as "The Campanile" or "The Shaft" (a tongue-in-cheek reference to student opinion on the school's difficult curriculum). The amphitheater and the Campanile reopened in 2011 after a two-year-long reconstruction as part of the ongoing Clough Undergraduate Learning Commons construction.

== Location ==
The Kessler Campanile is located near the center of Georgia Tech's campus, in front of its student center and directly down Tech Walkway (commonly/formerly known as Skiles Walkway) from the recently styled "Hill District," the campus' historical center. The campanile is surrounded by a 300-seat pavilion, a gathering place for the Georgia Tech community. It is visible from many areas of central campus.

== Design ==
The 80-foot-tall campanile has the rough appearance of a twisted obelisk, tapering towards the top and capped with a pyramidal piece. It is constructed of 244 stainless steel plates, with each rotated slightly to produce the swirling pattern as height increases. The design for the Campanile came from Richard Hill, who received both his undergraduate and MFA degrees from the Lamar Dodd School of Art at the University of Georgia. It came to fruition with the help of Georgia Tech alumnus Vic Williams, who created the CAD drawings for the Campanile. The structural Engineering was designed by Georgia Tech alumnus Jim O'kon, P.E. The distinctive peaks intentionally recall the design of Tech Tower, the school's traditional symbol and oldest building. Following its completion, the structure's peak design was incorporated into the university's branding as a new symbol for the school.

== Music ==
The campanile is able to play several songs, including Ramblin' Wreck from Georgia Tech, the university's fight song through specially designed speakers that reproduce the carillon "chime" sound of bells. While it used to play the Westminster Quarters to mark the passing of time, it has been silent since 2009.
