= North Avenue (Atlanta) =

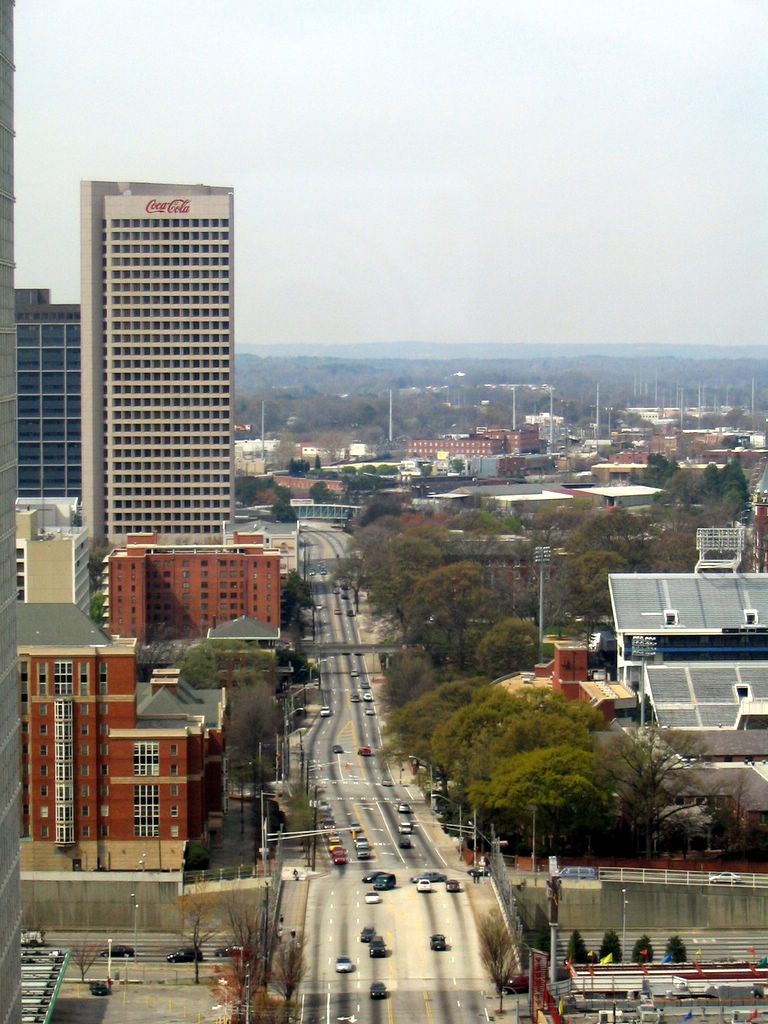
North Avenue as it passes the Coca-Cola Headquarters

North Avenue is a major avenue in Atlanta, Georgia that divides Downtown Atlanta from Midtown Atlanta. North Avenue stretches continuously in Atlanta from Candler Park in the east, across Interstate 75 & Interstate 85, along the southern boundary of the Georgia Institute of Technology, to Joseph E. Lowery Boulevard (formerly Ashby Avenue) just southwest of Georgia Tech, where it ends. North Avenue passes through the neighborhoods of Poncey-Highland, Old Fourth Ward, and Midtown Atlanta.

North Avenue was named at least 150 years ago and was built along the northern city limits of a young Atlanta. For decades, huge portions of both Atlanta itself and Metro Atlanta have been built north of North Avenue, and also beyond the eastern and western ends of North Avenue.

The western half of North Avenue carries U.S. Highway 29, U.S. 78, and U.S. 278, but the eastern parts of those highways follow Ponce de Leon Avenue, just one city block north of North Avenue. Eastbound lanes cross over on northbound-only Piedmont Avenue, westbound lanes one block west on southbound-only Juniper Street, which continues south as Courtland Street. These are the two blocks east of Peachtree Street, Atlanta's main north/south street and the division between the eastern and western quadrants of the city.

Further east, North Avenue crosses the northern branch of Freedom Parkway just south of where it ends at Ponce, then Highland Avenue, and then Moreland Avenue where it crosses the Fulton/DeKalb county line, one block north of the end of the eastern branch of Freedom Parkway. East of here, it loses its middle turn lane and all of the homes on the south side of the street, which were destroyed by the Georgia Department of Transportation in anticipation of the never-built section of the Stone Mountain Freeway. The road ends at Candler Park, with Candler Park Drive going only south and no roads to the north or east.

Notable landmarks along North Avenue include the Bank of America Plaza, The Varsity, the Georgia Institute of Technology, the high-rise headquarters of BellSouth Telecommunications, the historic DuPre Excelsior Mill (formerly The Masquerade concert venue, now relocated), and the high-rise world headquarters of The Coca-Cola Company. The basement of the telephone company building contains the North Avenue MARTA station, which is a station of the Metropolitan Atlanta Rapid Transit Authority rapid transit system along its main north/south Red & Gold lines. This MARTA station is the closest one to Georgia Tech, and it is a moderate walk between the two.

Georgia Tech is sometimes jokingly referred to as the "North Avenue Trade School" in reference to this street, the largest thoroughfare near its original center.

== History ==
When North Avenue was first constructed, this arrow-straight avenue followed the lines between the already-surveyed land lots in Fulton County, Georgia, and it was very near to the original northern city limits. In fact, there was a line of fortifications of Confederate Army dug just north of North Avenue for the Siege of Atlanta in 1864.

The first section of North Avenue was between land lots #50 and #49 west of West Peachtree Street and lots #47 and #48 to the east of this street. Prior to 1925, North Avenue ended at Randolph street. As part of the 1925 agreement with the city to build the Sears, Roebuck & Company's giant Atlanta retail store, North Avenue was extended to the Sidings Rail Road tracks (now the BeltLine near today's Ponce City Market (which is the former Sears, Roebuck, & Co. building) and the DuPre Excelsior Mill.

During the 1930s, a vehicle tunnel was dug underneath these railroad tracks, and then North Avenue was extended eastwards towards Atlanta's Candler Park. North Avenue dead-ends into Candler Park Drive, which forms the western boundary of the Candler Park golf course.

When Richard Peters was laying out the avenues and streets on the two large lots of land that he owned (#49 and #48), he counted North Avenue and Ponce de Leon Avenue as the first and second avenues north, and the next one north of those he named 3rd Avenue. Despite this, the "zero" east/west avenue which divides the northeast and southeast quadrants of Atlanta for the purpose of their street addresses and the U.S. Postal Service is Edgewood Avenue, which is many blocks farther south of North Avenue, running east from the downtown city center at Five Points. Because of this, the street numbers in midtown (the only part of the city that uses them) do not match the block numbers.
