= Technique (newspaper) =

Student newspaper of the Georgia Institute of Technology

Coordinates: 33.774496°N 84.399625°W

The Technique
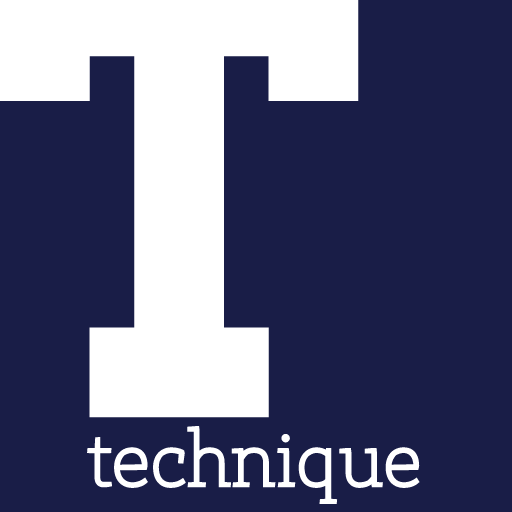

- The December 1, 2006, front page of the Technique
- Type: Weekly student newspaper
- Format: Tabloid
- School: Georgia Institute of Technology
- Owner: Georgia Institute of Technology
- Publisher: Georgia Tech Student Publications
- Editor: Yashvini Deva
- Founded: 1911
- Headquarters: 353 Ferst Dr NW; Atlanta, Georgia 30332, US
- Country: United States
- Circulation: 4,000 (spring and fall); Online-only (summer) (as of 2023)
- OCLC number: 1130759366
- Website: nique.net

The Technique, also known as the "'Nique", is the official student newspaper of the Georgia Institute of Technology in Atlanta, Georgia, and has referred to itself as "the South's liveliest college newspaper" since 1945. As of the fall semester of 2011, the Technique has a weekly circulation of 10,000, distributed to numerous locations on the Georgia Tech campus and a handful of locations in the surrounding area. The first issue of the Technique was published on November 17, 1911, and the paper has printed continuously since its founding. The paper publishes weekly throughout the regular school year and primarily covers news, events and issues specific to the Georgia Tech community. In 2004 it was one of 25 collegiate newspapers to receive the Pacemaker award from the Associated Collegiate Press.

== History ==
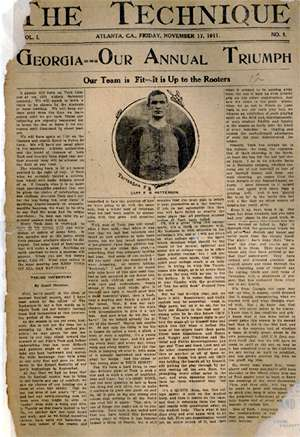
The front page of the first issue of The Technique

A publication known as The Georgia Tech was the Georgia Institute of Technology's (also known as Georgia Tech) first student newspaper. It was established in 1894 and was the second student publication to be established on campus. The Georgia Tech published a "Commencement Issue" that reviewed sporting events and gave information about each class. The "Commencement Issue" was likely similar to the Technique's Freshman Issue. The Technique was founded in 1911; its first issue was published on November 17, 1911 by editors Albert Blohm and E. A. Turner, and the content revolved around the upcoming rivalry football game against the University of Georgia. The first issue also featured an article by legendary football coach John Heisman.

The Technique has been published weekly ever since, except for a brief period that the paper was published twice weekly. This period ran from January 14, 1948, to September 6, 1956. The Georgia Tech and the Technique operated separately for several years following the Technique's establishment, though the two publications eventually merged in 1916. Several sources claim that the Technique is among a number of student organizations to be founded by the ANAK Society.

== Present-day publication ==
As of the 2024–2025 publication year, the print issue of the Technique is published biweekly. Additional articles are published online. General staff meetings are held on Tuesdays, when the majority of story assignments are made to the mostly-volunteer writing staff. The Technique's office is located in the northwest corner of the Student Services Building.

The paper is operated by a staff of approximately 50 paid and unpaid students, as well as two permanent, paid, non-student staff members. As Georgia Tech has no journalism school, the Technique welcomes all students within the institute to contribute to its content. The Technique is funded primarily by advertisements, and to a lesser extent by Tech's Student Government Association.

The Technique is generally between 16 and 40 pages long, the length of an issue being dependent upon the number of advertisements purchased for a given week. The paper is organized into five sections: News (includes Georgia Tech-specific crime reports and news), Life (previously Focus; includes human interest stories), Entertainment (includes reviews of music, movies, performance arts, and video games, cartoons, a crossword puzzle, and sudoku puzzles), Opinions (includes editorials, an editorial cartoon, op-eds, and letters to the editor), and Sports (includes summaries of recent Georgia Tech sports games and sports features).

== Special editions ==
=== To Hell With Georgia ===
The most well-known of the special issues the Technique publishes is a satire of the University of Georgia's (UGA) student newspaper (The Red and Black). The tradition of this parody dates back to the very first issue of the Technique, which was published with the intent of taunting Georgia Tech's rival school, and has its roots in the embittered rivalry between Georgia Tech and the University of Georgia. It is published just before the two schools compete in football and is one of the last issues of the fall semester. The parody is known as "To Hell With Georgia", after the school's popular cheer. On years where the schools play their football match at UGA's Sanford Stadium, Technique staff distribute the issue across UGA's campus.

=== Freshman Issue ===
The Freshman Issue is another special edition of the Technique. It is the first issue published each academic year and is by far the longest issue, with each of the sections about as long as a normal issue. The content usually centers on the themes of welcoming freshmen and welcoming returning students back to Tech. The Freshman Issue also contains a special section dedicated to helping freshmen become more acquainted with Tech and its customs. It is generally the only issue in which content from previous issues is reprinted.

=== Other special editions ===
Other special editions include the Homecoming issue, the April Fool's issue (historically known as the Techlique, which includes a section of fake news parodying Tech in a similar style to the "To Hell With Georgia" issue) and the "Best of Tech" issue, which is the final issue of the spring semester.

== Recurring features ==
=== Two Bits ===
The Technique featured an anonymous humor column called "Two Bits", which is authored by the mysterious Two Bits Man, a sarcastic, everyday virtuoso who concerns himself with Tech- and university-specific subjects. His articles range from relentless sickly sniffles to school-wide subjects of controversy or interest. Popular targets for his scorn include Georgia Tech's Parking department and School of Physics, whereas he consistently praises the President Emeritus G. Wayne Clough, who he refers to as "Funk Masta G. Wayne". The Two Bits column had been discontinued in 2010, but was brought back in 2012, to again be discontinued in 2013.

=== Sliver Box ===
One of the Technique's most popular features is the Sliver Box, an analogue of the Vent feature of the Atlanta Journal-Constitution, which allows readers to submit any comment they wish. Comments are submitted on the Technique's website and as many Slivers that will fit appear in the week's paper, usually in order of submission. Slivers are subject to minimal censorship, with only full names of non-public figures, personal information, and strong profanities typically removed or altered. Other entries are occasionally removed or truncated, usually in cases of spamming of the Sliver submission system. According to the paper, the Box is used to fill empty room left between advertisements in order to maintain a modular layout style. It is not uncommon for students to have conversations using the Sliver Box. Slivers were originally comments made by editorial board members during deadline night and were placed in narrow boxes ("Slivers") at the bottom of each page. Comments made on deadline night and opinions of editorial board members still occasionally find their way into the Sliver Box.

== Controversies ==
=== 1995 refusal of Campus Crusade for Christ ad ===
In 1995, Campus Crusade for Christ registered a complaint with the attorney general's office protesting the paper's refusal of its ad which included a picture of a young man captioned “a former homosexual, male prostitute and female impersonator." right around National Coming Out Day. The CCC argued that the refusal amounted to a state censorship, because administration was allegedly involved in the decision and that administration is considered a state agency. Following the AG's opinion, the paper reluctantly agreed to run the ad, however, CCC withdrew the ad before it ran. Students sent in letters to the editor supporting both CCC and the Technique.
