= History of the Georgia Institute of Technology =

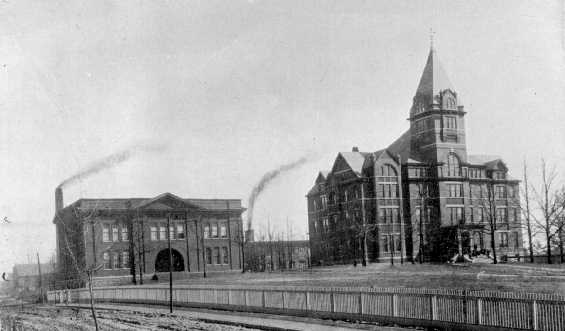
An early photograph of Georgia Tech depicting the shop building (left) and Tech Tower (right)

The history of the Georgia Institute of Technology can be traced back to Reconstruction-era plans to develop the industrial base of the Southern United States. Founded on October 13, 1885, in Atlanta as the Georgia School of Technology, the university opened in 1888 after the construction of Tech Tower and a shop building and only offered one degree in mechanical engineering. By 1901, degrees in electrical, civil, textile, and chemical engineering were also offered. In 1948, the name was changed to the Georgia Institute of Technology to reflect its evolution from an engineering school to a full technical institute and research university.

The Georgia Institute of Technology (Georgia Tech) is the birthplace of two other Georgia universities: Georgia State University and the former Southern Polytechnic State University. Georgia Tech's Evening School of Commerce, established in 1912 and moved to the University of Georgia in 1931, was independently established as Georgia State University in 1955. Although Georgia Tech did not officially allow women to enroll until 1952 (and did not fully integrate the curriculum until 1968), the night school enrolled female students as early as the fall of 1917. The Southern Technical Institute (now Southern Polytechnic College of Engineering and Engineering Technology of Kennesaw State University and formerly known as Southern Polytechnic State University) was founded by president Blake R. Van Leer as an extension of Georgia Tech in 1948 as a technical trade school for World War II veterans and became an independent university in 1981.

The Great Depression saw a consistent squeeze on Georgia Tech's budget, but World War II–inspired research activity combined with post–World War II enrollment more than compensated for the school's difficulties. Georgia Tech desegregated peacefully and without a court order in 1961, in contrast to other southern universities. Similarly, it did not experience any protests due to the Vietnam War. The growth of the graduate and research programs combined with diminishing federal support for universities in the 1980s led President John Patrick Crecine to restructure the university in 1988 amid significant controversy. The 1990s were marked by continued expansion of the undergraduate programs and the satellite campuses in Savannah, Georgia, and Metz, France. In 1996, Georgia Tech was the site of the athletes' village and a venue for a number of athletic events for the Summer Olympics. Recently, the school has gradually improved its academic rankings and has paid significant attention to modernizing the campus, increasing historically low retention rates, and establishing degree options emphasizing research and international perspectives.

== Establishment (Before 1888) ==
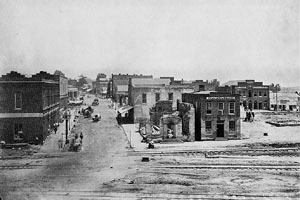
Atlanta during the Civil War (c. 1864)

As noted by a historical marker on the large hill in Central Campus, the site occupied by the school's first buildings once held fortifications built to protect Atlanta during the Atlanta campaign of the American Civil War. The surrender of the city took place on the southwestern boundary of the modern Georgia Tech campus in 1864. The next twenty years were a time of rapid industrial expansion; during this period, Georgia's manufacturing capital, railroad track mileage, and property values would each increase by a factor of three to four.

The establishment of a school of technology was proposed in 1882 during the Reconstruction period. Major John Fletcher Hanson and Nathaniel Edwin Harris, two former Confederate officers who became prominent citizens in the town of Macon, Georgia, after the war, strongly believed that the South needed to improve its technology to compete with the Industrial Revolution that was occurring throughout the North. Many Southerners at this time agreed with this idea, known as the "New South Creed". Its strongest proponent was Henry W. Grady, editor of The Atlanta Constitution during the 1880s. A technology school was thought necessary because the American South of that era was mostly agrarian, and few technical developments were occurring. Georgians needed technical training to advance the state's industry.

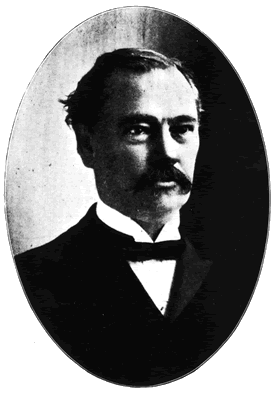
Nathaniel Edwin Harris, founder of Georgia Tech, served on its Board of Trustees from its establishment until his death.

With authorization from the Georgia General Assembly, Harris and a committee of prominent Georgians visited renowned technology schools in the Northeast in 1883; these included the Massachusetts Institute of Technology (MIT), the Worcester Polytechnic Institute, Stevens Institute of Technology, and Cooper Union. Using these examples, the committee reported that the Worcester model, which stressed a combination of "theory and practice was the embodiment of the best conception of industrial education". The "practice" component of the Worcester model included student employment and production of consumer items to generate revenue for the school.

When the committee returned, they submitted their findings to the Georgia General Assembly as House Bill 732 on July 24, 1883. The bill, written by Harris, met significant opposition from various sources and was defeated. Reasons for opposition included the general resistance to education, specifically technical education, concerns voiced by agricultural interests, and fiscal concerns relating to the limited treasury of the Georgia government; the state's 1877 constitution prohibited spending beyond its means as a reactionary measure to excessive spending by "carpetbaggers and Negro leaders".

In February 1883, Harris submitted a second version, this time with the support of contemporary political leaders Joseph M. Terrell and R. B. Russell as well as the popular support of the influential State Agricultural Society and the leaders of the University of Georgia, the latter of which would be the "parent college" of any state technical school. In 1885, House Bill 732 was submitted and passed the House 94–62. The bill was passed in the Senate with two amendments, and the amended bill was defeated in the House 65–53. After back-room work by Harris, the bill finally passed 69–44. On October 13, 1885, Georgia Governor Henry D. McDaniel signed the bill to create and fund the new school. The legislature then established a committee to determine the location of the new school. The school was officially established, and subsequent efforts to repeal the law were suppressed by supporter and Speaker of the House W. A. Little.

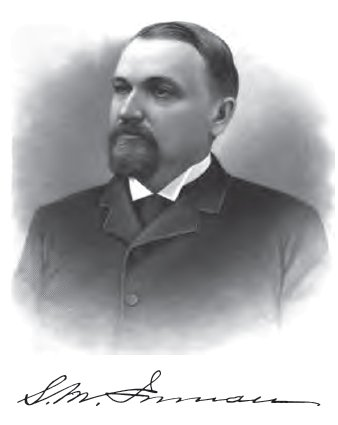
Samuel M. Inman, an early and lifelong supporter of Georgia Tech

McDaniel appointed a commission in January 1886 to organize and run the school. This commission elected Harris chairman, a position he would hold until his death. Other members included Samuel M. Inman, Oliver S. Porter, Judge Columbus Heard, and Edward R. Hodgson; each was known either for political or industrial experience. Their first task was to select a location for the new school. Letters were sent to communities throughout the state, and five bids were presented by the October 1, 1886, deadline: Athens, Atlanta, Macon, Penfield, and Milledgeville. The commission inspected the proposed sites from October 7 to October 18. Patrick Hues Mell, the president of the University of Georgia at that time, believed that it should be located in Athens with the university's main campus, like the Agricultural and Mechanical Schools.

The committee members voted exclusively for their respective home cities until the 21st ballot when Porter switched to Atlanta; on the 24th ballot, Atlanta finally emerged victorious. Students at the University of Georgia burned Judge Heard in effigy after the final vote was announced. Atlanta's bid included US$50,000 from the city, $20,000 from private citizens (including $5,000 from Samuel M. Inman), and $2,500 in guaranteed yearly support, along with a gift of 4 acres (16,000 m^{2}) of land from Atlanta pioneer Richard Peters instead of the initially proposed site in Atlanta's bid, which was near land that Lemuel P. Grant was developing, including Grant Park.

The school's new location was bounded on the south by North Avenue, and on the west by Cherry Street. Peters sold five adjoining acres of land to the state for $10,000. This land was situated on what was then Atlanta's northern city limits. The act that created the school had also appropriated $65,000 towards the construction of new buildings.

== Early years (1888–1896) ==
The time and attention of students will be duly proportioned between scholastic and mechanical pursuits, and special prominence will be given to the element of practice in every department.

— Georgia School of Technology Prospectus, 1888

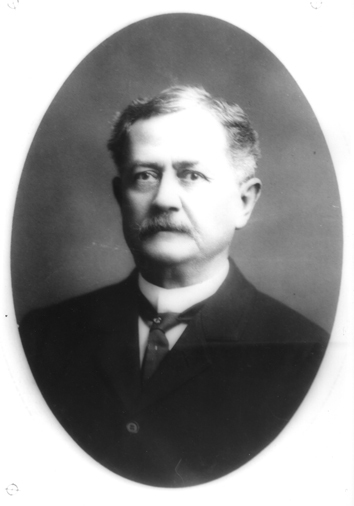
Isaac S. Hopkins, president of Georgia Tech from 1888 to 1896

The Georgia School of Technology opened its doors in the fall of 1888 with only two buildings, under the leadership of professor and pastor Isaac S. Hopkins. One building (now Tech Tower, the main administrative complex) had classrooms to teach students; the other featured a workshop with a foundry, forge, boiler room, and engine room. It was designed specifically as a "contract shop" where students would work to produce goods to sell, creating revenue for the school while the students learned vocational skills in a "hands-on" manner. Such a method was seen as appropriate given the Southern United States' need for industrial development. The two buildings were equal in size and staffing (five professors and five shop supervisors) to show the importance of teaching both the mind and the hands. At the time, there was some disagreement as to whether the machine shop should have been used to turn a profit. The contract shop system ended in 1896 due to its lack of profitability, after which point the items produced were used to furnish the offices and dorms on the campus.

The first class of students at the Georgia School of Technology was small and homogeneous, and educational options were limited. Eighty-five students signed up on the first registration day, October 7, 1888, and the enrollment for the first year climbed to a total of 129 by January 7, 1889. The first student to register was William H. Glenn. All but one or two of the students were from Georgia. Tuition was free for Georgia residents and $150 (equivalent to $5,370 in 2025) for out-of-state students. The only degree offered was a Bachelor of Science in mechanical engineering, and no elective courses were available. All students were required to follow exactly the same program, which was so rigorous that nearly two thirds of the first class failed to complete it. The first graduating class consisted of two students in 1890, Henry L. Smith and George G. Crawford, who decided their graduation order on the flip of a coin.

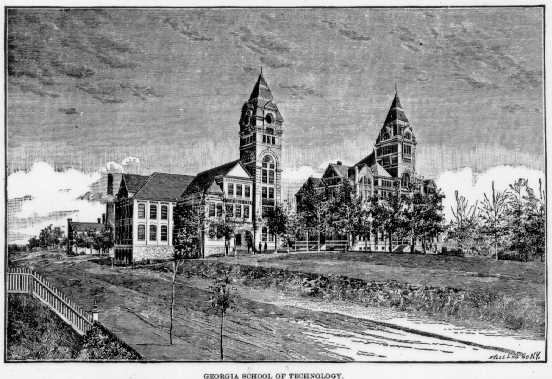
An 1888 engraving illustrating the modest Georgia Tech campus

John Saylor Coon was appointed the first Mechanical Engineering and Drawing Professor at the Georgia School of Technology in 1889. He was also the first chair of the mechanical engineering department. Coon assumed the role of superintendent of shops in 1896. During his tenure at Georgia Tech, he moved the curriculum away from vocational training. Coon emphasized a balance between the shop and the classroom. Coon taught his students more modern quantification methods to solve engineering problems instead of outdated and more costly trial and error methods. He also played a significant role in developing mechanical engineering into a professional degree program, with a focus on ethics, design and testing, analysis and problem solving, and mathematics.

Tech began its football program with several students forming a loose-knit troop of footballers called the Blacksmiths. The first season saw Tech play three games and lose all three. Discouraged by these results, the Blacksmiths sought a coach to improve their record. Leonard Wood, an army officer who had played football at Harvard and was then stationed in Atlanta and taking graduate courses at the school, volunteered to serve as the team's player-coach. In 1893, Tech played its first game against the University of Georgia (Georgia). Tech defeated Georgia 28–6 for the school's first-ever victory. The angry Georgia fans threw stones and other debris at the Tech players during and after the game. The poor treatment of the Blacksmiths by the Georgia faithful gave birth to the rivalry now known as Clean, Old-Fashioned Hate.

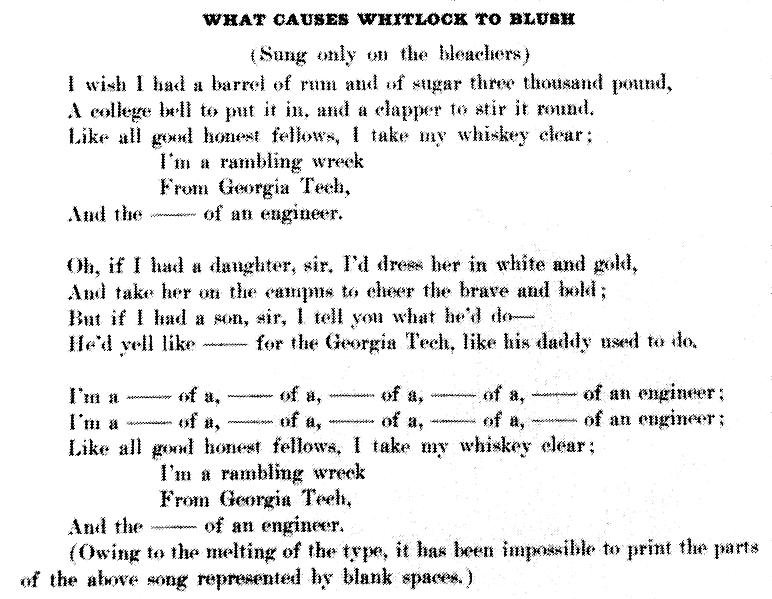
The first publication of "Ramblin' Wreck", in the 1908 Blue Print

The words to Georgia Tech's famous fight song, "Ramblin' Wreck from Georgia Tech", are said to have come from an early baseball game against rival Georgia. Some sources credit Billy Walthall, a member of the first four-year graduating class, with the lyrics. According to a 1954 article in Sports Illustrated, "Ramblin' Wreck" was written around 1893 by a Tech football player on his way to an Auburn game. In 1905, Georgia Tech adopted it in roughly the current form as its official fight song, although it had apparently been the unofficial fight song for several years. It was published for the first time in the school's first yearbook, the 1908 Blue Print, under the heading "What causes Whitlock to Blush." Words such as "hell" and "helluva" were censored in this first printing as "certain words [are] too hot to print." After Michael A. Greenblatt, the first bandmaster of the Georgia Tech Marching Band, heard the band playing the song to the tune of Charles Ives's "A Son of a Gambolier", he wrote a modern musical version. In 1911, Frank Roman succeeded Greenblatt as bandmaster; Roman embellished the song with trumpet flourishes and publicized it. Roman copyrighted the song in 1919.

Tech's first student publication was the Technologian, which ran for a short time in 1891. The next student publication was The Georgia Tech, established in 1894. The Georgia Tech published a "Commencement Issue" that reviewed sporting events and gave information about each class. The Technique was founded in 1911; its first issue was published on November 17, 1911, by editors Albert Blohm and E. A. Turner, and the content revolved around the upcoming rivalry football game against the University of Georgia. The Technique has been published weekly ever since, with the exception of a brief period during which the paper was published twice weekly. The Georgia Tech was merged into the Technique in 1916.

== Engineering school (1896–1905) ==
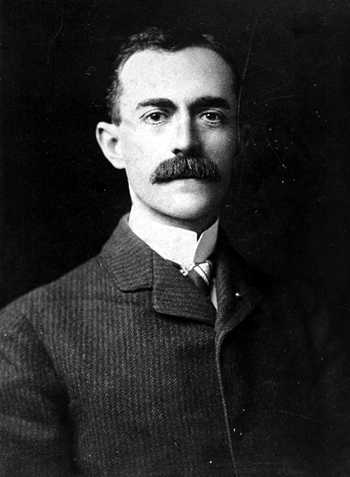
Captain Lyman Hall, president of Georgia Tech from 1896 until his death in 1905

In 1888, Captain Lyman Hall was appointed Georgia Tech's first mathematics professor, a position he held until his appointment as the school's second president in 1896. Hall had a solid background in engineering due to his time at West Point and often incorporated surveying and other engineering applications into his coursework. He had an energetic personality and quickly assumed a leadership position among the faculty. As president, Hall was noted for his aggressive fundraising and improvements to the school, including his special project, the A. French Textile School. In February 1899, Georgia Tech opened the first textile engineering school in the Southern United States, with $10,000 from the Georgia General Assembly, $20,000 of donated machinery, and $13,500 from supporters. It named the A. French Textile School after its chief donor and supporter, Aaron S. French. The textile engineering program would move to the Harrison Hightower Textile Engineering Building in 1949.

Hall's other goals included enlarging Tech and attracting more students, so he expanded the school's offerings beyond mechanical engineering; new degrees introduced during Hall's administration included electrical engineering and civil engineering in December 1896, textile engineering in February 1899, and engineering chemistry in January 1901. Hall also became infamous as a disciplinarian, even suspending the entire senior class of 1901 for returning from Christmas vacation a day late.

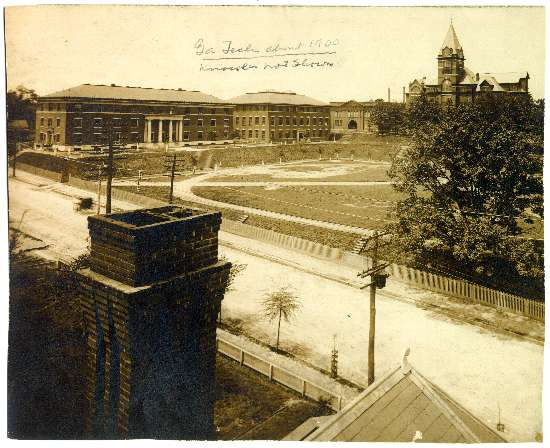
Georgia Tech around 1900, with Tech Tower in the background

Hall died on August 16, 1905, during a vacation at a New York health resort. His death while still in office was attributed to stress from his strenuous fundraising activities (this time, for a new chemistry building). Later that year, the school's trustees named the new chemistry building the "Lyman Hall Laboratory of Chemistry" in his honor.

On October 20, 1905, U.S. President Theodore Roosevelt visited the Georgia Tech campus. On the steps of Tech Tower, Roosevelt presented a speech about the importance of technological education:

America can be the first nation only by the kind of training and effort which is developed and is symbolized in institutions of this kind ... Every triumph of engineering skill credited to an American is credited to America. It is incumbent upon you to do well, not only for your individual sakes, but for the sake of that collective American citizenship which dominates the American nation.

Roosevelt then shook hands with every student. Tech was later visited by president-elect William H. Taft on January 16, 1909, and president Franklin D. Roosevelt on November 29, 1935.

== World War I (1905–1922) ==
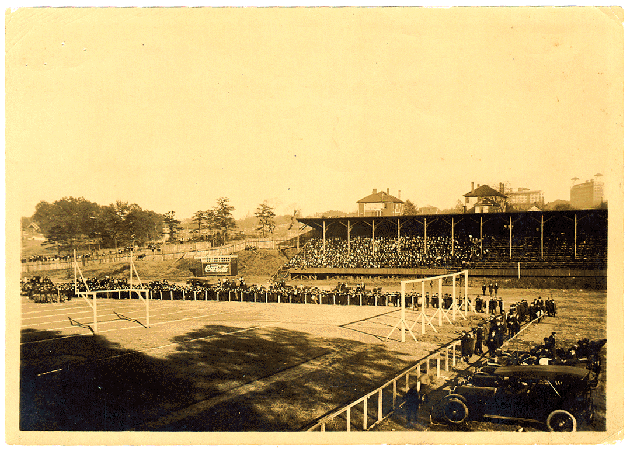
Grant Field and the east stands around 1912

Upon his hiring in 1904, John Heisman (for whom the Heisman Trophy is named) insisted that the school acquire its own football field. Previously, the team had used area parks, especially the playing fields of Piedmont Park. Georgia Tech took out a seven-year lease on what is now the southern end of Grant Field, although the land was not adequate for sports, due to its unleveled, rocky nature. In 1905, Heisman had 300 convict laborers clear rocks, remove tree stumps, and level out the field for play; Tech students then built a grandstand on the property. The land was purchased by 1913, and John W. Grant donated $15,000 (equivalent to $488,600 in 2025) towards the construction of the field's first permanent stands. The field was named Grant Field in honor of the donor's deceased son, Hugh Inman Grant.

Attempts at forming an alumni association had been made since 1896; a charter was applied for by J. B. McCrary and William H. Glenn on June 28, 1906, and was approved by Fulton County on June 20, 1908. The Georgia Tech Alumni Association published its first annual report in 1908, but the group was largely dormant during World War I. The organization played an important role in the 1920s Greater Georgia Tech Campaign, which consolidated all existing alumni clubs and funded a significant expansion of Georgia Tech's campus.

Georgia Tech's Evening School of Commerce began holding classes in 1912. The school admitted its first female student in 1917, although the state legislature did not officially authorize attendance by women until 1920. Anna Teitelbaum Wise became the first female graduate in 1919 and went on to become Georgia Tech's first female faculty member the following year.

World War I caused several changes at the school. During the conflict and for some time afterwards, Georgia Tech hosted a school for cadet aviators, supply officers, and army technicians. Tech also started a Reserve Officer Training Corps unit; the first in the Southern United States, it became a permanent addition to the school. World War I affected the school academically as well: the United States government asked for and financed an automotive school for army officers, a rehabilitation program for disabled soldiers, and a geology department. Federal aid also helped to establish Tech's industrial education department, courtesy of the Smith–Hughes Act of 1917. The war also placed on hold extensive fundraising efforts for a new power plant, and made it difficult to find engineers willing to teach at the school; Matheson toured Harvard, Yale, Princeton, Columbia, and MIT in 1919 but failed to secure a single hire, as none of the students wished to work for such low wages.

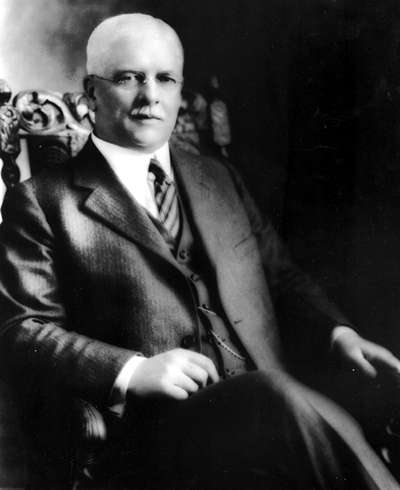
Kenneth G. Matheson, president of Georgia Tech from 1906 to 1922

The bitter rivalry between Georgia Tech and the University of Georgia flared up in 1919, when UGA mocked Tech's continuation of football during the United States' involvement in World War I. Because Tech was a military training ground, it had a complete assembly of male students. Many schools, such as UGA, lost all of their able-bodied male students to the war effort, forcing them to temporarily suspend football during the war. In fact, UGA did not play a game from 1917 to 1918.

When UGA renewed its program in 1919, their student body staged a parade which mocked Tech's continuation of football during times of war. The parade featured a tank-shaped float marked "Argonne" with a sign "Georgia in France 1917" followed by an automobile with three people in Tech sweaters and caps bearing a sign "Tech in Atlanta". A printed program was subsequently distributed in the stands with a similar point. While the Tech faculty was able to prevent a riot, no apology was made, and this act led directly to Tech cutting athletic ties with UGA and canceling several of UGA's home football games at Grant Field (UGA commonly used Grant Field as its home field). Tech and UGA did not compete in athletics until the 1921 Southern Conference basketball tournament. Despite intense pressure on Tech to make amends, Matheson stated that he would never change his mind unless "due apologies" were offered, and if he was overruled, he would resign. Regular season competition did not renew until after Matheson's retirement, in a 1925 agreement between the two institutions negotiated by athletic directors J. B. Crenshaw and S. V. Sanford.

In 1916 Georgia Tech's football team, still coached by John Heisman, defeated Cumberland 222–0, the largest margin of victory in college football history. Cumberland's total net yardage was −28 and it had only one play for positive yards. Cumberland beat Georgia Tech's baseball team 22 to 0 the previous year, reportedly with the help of professional players Cumberland had hired as "ringers", an act which infuriated Heisman. Heisman amassed 104 wins over 16 seasons and led Tech to its first national title in 1917. After divorcing from his wife, Heisman moved to Pennsylvania in 1919, leaving Tech's Yellow Jackets in the hands of William Alexander.

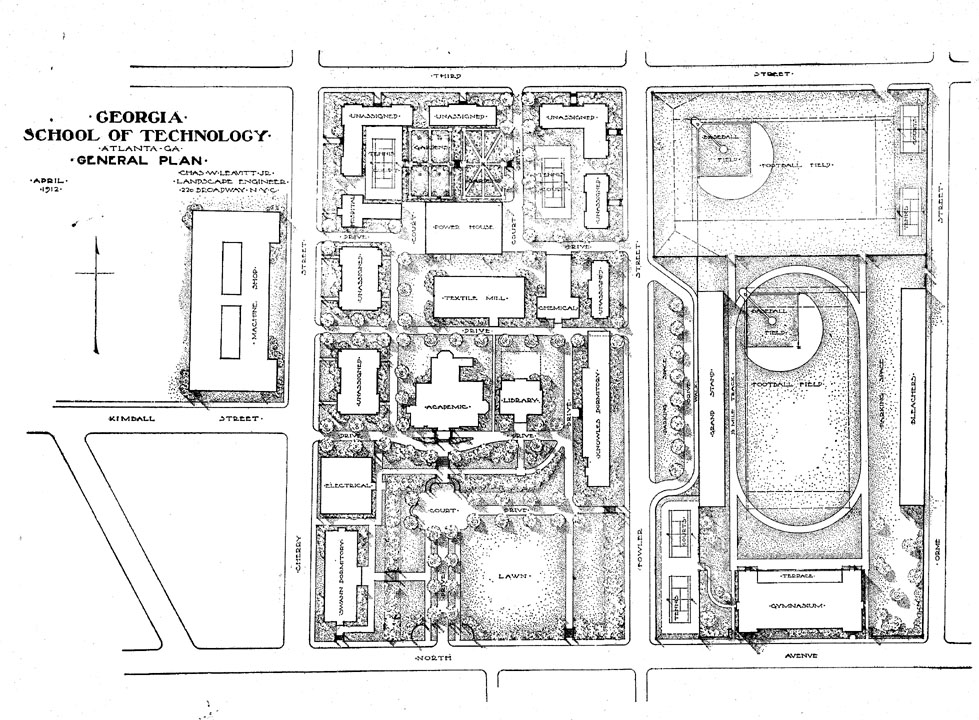
Georgia Tech's first master plan, created in April 1912

In its first decades, Georgia Tech slowly grew from a trade school into a university. The state and federal governments provided little initiative for the school to grow significantly until 1919. That year, the Georgia General Assembly passed an act entitled "Establishing State Engineering Experiment Station at the Georgia School of Technology". This change coincided with federal debate about the establishment of Engineering Experiment Stations in a move similar to the Hatch Act of 1887's establishment of agricultural experiment stations; each Engineering Experiment Station would be a consultant group dedicated to assisting a region's industrial efforts. The EES at Georgia Tech was established with the goal of the "encouragement of industries and commerce" within the state. The coinciding federal effort failed, however, and the state did not finance Georgia Tech's EES, so the new organization existed only on paper.

The latter years of Matheson's presidency were troubled by a chronic shortage of funds. In 1919–1920, facilities designed for 700 students had to serve 1,365 students, and the school received the same $100,000 appropriation (equivalent to $1,857,000 in 2025) that it had received since 1915, made worse by inflation which nearly halved its value in that time. Matheson was able to acquire a $25,000 increase from the General Assembly that year. In 1920–1921, though, an increase of $125,000 (to $250,000) was passed but subsequently tabled due to differences between the House and Senate version of the bill unrelated to Tech. To continue running the school, a frantic scramble for funds was undertaken, resulting in $40,000 from the General Education Board, $30,000 from a loan fund organized by the Georgia Rotary Club, and a grant from the Atlanta City Council. The University of Georgia, in a similar financial condition, was forced to cut its faculty's salary. After this drama, the situation still did not improve: in 1922–1923, only $112,500 of the requested $250,000 had been appropriated, leading Matheson to reluctantly start charging in-state students for tuition. The rates were $100 for in-state students (equivalent to $1,900 in 2025) and $175 for out-of-state students (equivalent to $3,400 in 2025). Georgia Tech still needed a $125,000 line of credit against its first professional fund-raising effort, the "Greater Georgia Tech Campaign".

As Matheson was leaving for the presidency of Drexel Institute in late 1921, he wrote in The Atlanta Constitution that while Georgia Tech was "my first love" he found it a "humiliating burden" to get enough money from the state legislature to run and enlarge the school. The board of trustees offered him a substantial pay increase, but his issue was with the politics of the time, and not with his financial situation. In 1921, Matheson wrote:

It was our hope and belief that by developing an efficient technological school, the legislators would amply support it. In spite of many handicaps and discouragements, we gave to the state what competent critics declare to be the second engineering college of the nation–the first [MIT], by the way, having recently spent $28,000,000 in its development. Notwithstanding ... [soaring] enrollment, donated equipment totaling many thousands of dollars in value, $1,500,000 in subscriptions from friends and other evidences of growth, the legislatures of the past two summers have appropriated only half of the amount actually needed for the operation of the school. In 1920, upon the failure to appropriate the additional $100,000 necessary to keep Tech's doors open, I again became a modern Lazarus and successfully begged from Atlanta to New York the crumbs from the rich men's tables which a rich mother had denied ... Again [in 1921] we have met the emergency at a disruptive and destructive cost which cannot be continued.

== Technological university (1922–1944) ==
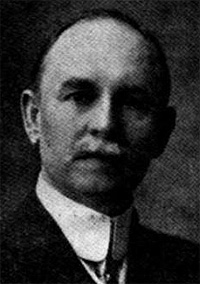
Marion L. Brittain, president of the school from 1922 to 1944

On August 1, 1922, Marion L. Brittain was elected as the school's president. He noted in the 1923 annual report that "there are more students in Georgia Tech than in any other two colleges in Georgia, and we have the smallest appropriation of them all." He was able to convince the state of Georgia to increase the school's funding during his tenure. Additionally, a $300,000 grant (equivalent to $5,781,900 in 2025) from the Daniel Guggenheim Fund for the Promotion of Aeronautics allowed Brittain to establish the Daniel Guggenheim School of Aeronautics. In 1930, Brittain's decision to use the money for a new school of aeronautics, headed by Montgomery Knight, was controversial; today, the Daniel Guggenheim School of Aerospace Engineering boasts the second largest faculty in the United States behind MIT. Other accomplishments during Brittain's administration included a doubling of Georgia Tech's enrollment, accreditation from the Southern Association of Colleges and Schools, and the creation of a new ceramic engineering department, building, and major that attracted the American Ceramics Society's national convention to Atlanta.

In 1929, some Georgia Tech faculty members belonging to Sigma Xi started a research club that met once a month at Tech. One of the monthly subjects, proposed by ceramic engineering professor W. Harry Vaughan, was a collection of issues related to Tech, such as library development, and the development of a state engineering station. Such a station would theoretically assist local businesses with engineering problems via Georgia Tech's established faculty and resources. This group investigated the forty existing engineering experiments at universities around the country, and the report was compiled by Harold Bunger, Montgomery Knight, and Vaughan in December 1929.

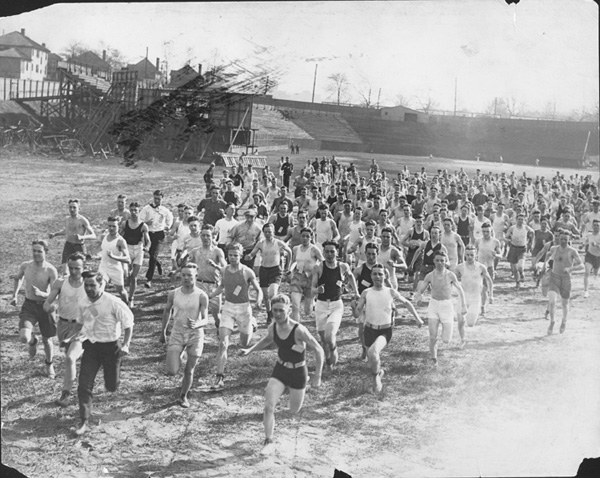
The 1922 Freshman Cake Race, an early and enduring tradition

The Great Depression threatened the already tentative nature of Georgia Tech's funding. In a speech on April 27, 1930, Brittain proposed that the university system be reorganized under a central body, rather than having each university under its own board. As a result, the Georgia General Assembly and Governor Richard Russell Jr. passed an act in 1931 that established the University System of Georgia (USG) and the corresponding Georgia Board of Regents; unfortunately for Brittain and Georgia Tech, the board was composed almost entirely of graduates of the University of Georgia. In its final act on January 7, 1932, the Tech Board of Trustees sent a letter to the chairman of the Georgia Board of Regents outlining its priorities for the school. The Depression also affected enrollment, which dropped from 3,271 in 1931–1932 to a low of 2,482 in 1933–1934, and only gradually increased afterwards. It also caused a decrease in funding from the State of Georgia, which in turn caused a decrease in faculty salaries, firing of graduate student assistants, and a postponing of building renovations.

As a cost-saving move, effective on July 1, 1934, the Georgia Board of Regents transferred control of the relatively large Evening School of Commerce to the University of Georgia and moved the small civil engineering program at UGA to Tech. The move was controversial, and both students and faculty protested against it, fearing that the board of regents would remove other programs from Georgia Tech and reduce it to an engineering department of the University of Georgia. Brittain suggested that the lack of Georgia Tech alumni on the board of regents contributed to their decision. Despite the pressure, the board of regents held its ground. The Depression also had a significant impact on the athletic program, as most athletes were in the commerce school, and resulted in the elimination of athletic scholarships, which were replaced by a loan program. Plans for an industrial management department to replace and supersede the Evening School of Commerce were first made in fall 1934. The department was established in 1935, and evolved into Tech's College of Management.

In 1933, S. V. Sanford, president of the University of Georgia, proposed that a "technical research activity" be established at Tech. Brittain and Dean William Vernon Skiles examined the Research Club's 1929 report, and moved to create such an organization. W. Harry Vaughan was selected as its acting director in April 1934, and $5,000 in funds were allocated directly from the Georgia Board of Regents. These funds went to the previously established Engineering Experiment Station (EES); its initial areas of focus were textiles, ceramics, and helicopter engineering. Georgia Tech's EES later became the Georgia Tech Research Institute (GTRI).

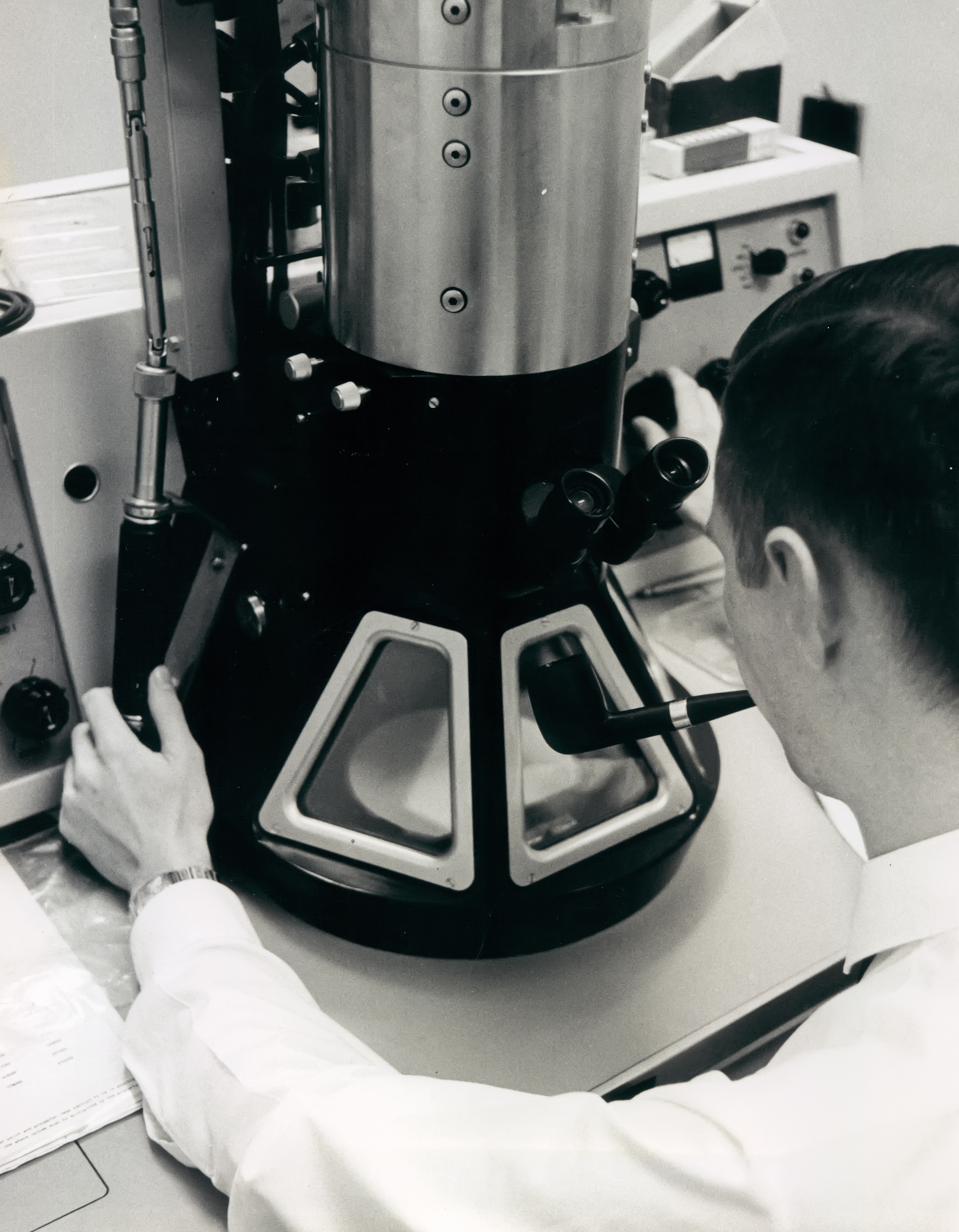
EES Researcher Jim Hubbard with the EM200 electron microscope

The EES's early work was conducted in the basement of the Shop Building, and Vaughan's office was in the Aeronautical Engineering Building. By 1938, the EES was producing useful technology, and the station needed a method to conduct contract work outside of the state budget. Consequently, the Industrial Development Council (IDC) was formed. It was created by the Chancellor of the university system and the president of Georgia Power Company, and the EES's director was a member of the council. The IDC later became the Georgia Tech Research Corporation, which currently serves as the sole contract organization for all Georgia Tech faculty and departments.

In 1939, EES director Vaughan became the director of the School of Ceramic Engineering. He was the director of the station until 1940, when he accepted a higher-paying job at the Tennessee Valley Authority and was replaced by Harold Bunger (the first chairman of Georgia Tech's chemical engineering department). When the ceramics department was temporarily discontinued due to World War II, the current students found wartime employment. The department would be reincarnated after the war under the guidance of Lane Mitchell.

The Cocking affair occurred in 1941 and 1942 when Georgia governor Eugene Talmadge exerted direct control over the state's educational system, particularly through the firing of University of Georgia professor Walter Cocking, who had been hired to raise the relatively low academic standards at UGA's College of Education. Talmadge justified his actions by asserting that Cocking intended to integrate a part of the University of Georgia. Cocking's removal and the subsequent removal of members of the Georgia Board of Regents (including the vice chancellor) who disagreed with the decision were particularly controversial. Talmadge attempted to place Tech football star Red Barron in a new position as vice president of Georgia Tech; the move was widely criticized by Georgia Tech alumni, who marched on the capitol, and Barron subsequently declined to accept the position. In response to the actions of Governor Talmadge, the Southern Association of Independent Schools withdrew accreditation from all Georgia state-supported colleges for whites, including Georgia Tech. The controversy was instrumental in Talmadge's loss in the 1943 gubernatorial elections to Ellis Arnall.

World War II resulted in a dramatic increase of sponsored research, with the 1943–1944 budget being the first in which industry and government contracts exceeded the EES's other income (most notably, its state appropriation). Vaughan had initially prepared the faculty for fewer incoming contracts as the state had cut the station's appropriation by 40 percent, but increased support from industry and government eventually counteracted low state support. The electronics and communications research that directors Gerald Rosselot and James E. Boyd attracted is still a mainstay of GTRI research. Two of the larger projects were a study on the propagation of electromagnetic waves, and United States Navy–sponsored radar research.

Until the mid-1940s, the school required students to be able to create a simple electric motor regardless of their major. During World War II, as an engineering school with strong military ties through its ROTC program, Georgia Tech was swiftly enlisted for the war effort. In early 1942 the traditional nine-month semester system was replaced by a year-round trimester year, enabling students to complete their degrees a year earlier. Under the plan, students were allowed to complete their engineering degrees while on active duty. During World War II, Georgia Tech was one of 131 colleges and universities that took part in the V-12 Navy College Training Program which offered students a path to a naval commission. The school was also one of only five U.S. colleges feeding into the United States Naval Academy.

== Postwar changes and unrest (1944–1956) ==
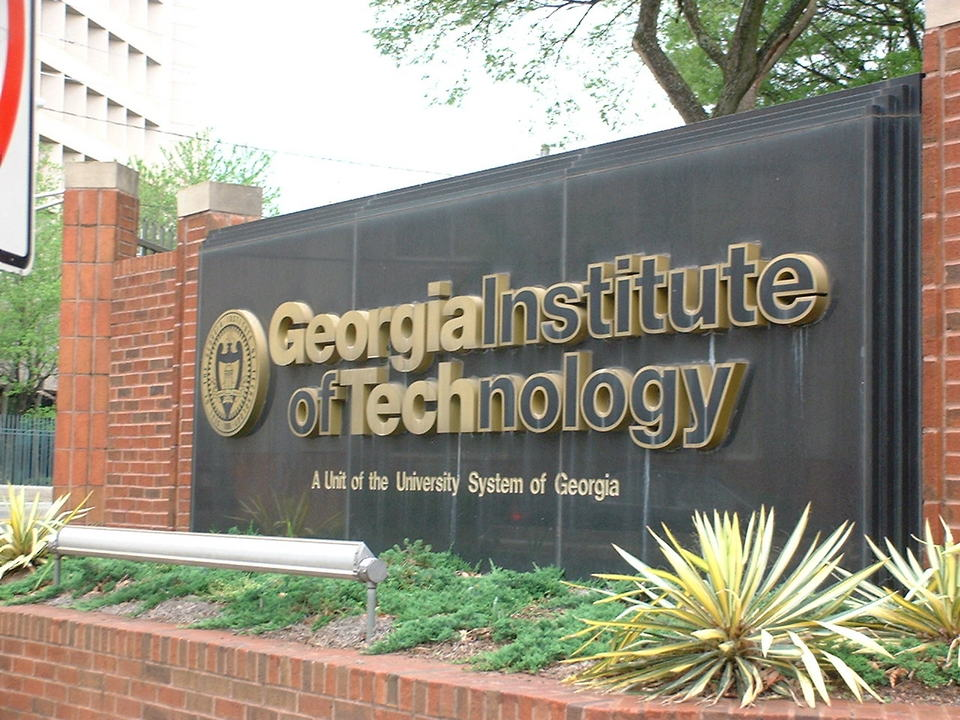
A sign marking one entrance to Georgia Tech's campus, bearing its modern name

Founded as the Georgia School of Technology, the school assumed its present name on July 1, 1948, to reflect a growing focus on advanced technological and scientific research. The name change was first proposed on June 12, 1906, but did not gain momentum until Blake R. Van Leer's presidency. Unlike similarly named universities such as the Massachusetts Institute of Technology and the California Institute of Technology, the Georgia Institute of Technology is a public university. Concurrent with the name change, President Emeritus Marion L. Brittain published The Story of Georgia Tech, the first comprehensive, book-length history of the school.

The Southern Technical Institute (STI) was founded by Tech's president and active U.S. Army Colonel Blake R. Van Leer in 1948 in barracks on the campus of Naval Air Station Atlanta (now DeKalb Peachtree Airport) in Chamblee, northeast of Atlanta. At that time, all colleges in Georgia were considered extensions of the state's four research universities, and the Southern Technical Institute belonged to Georgia Tech. STI was established as an engineering technology school, to help military personnel returning from World War II gain hands-on experience in technical fields. Around 1958, the school moved to Marietta, to land donated by Dobbins Air Force Base. STI was split from Georgia Tech in 1981, at a time when most other regional schools separated from the University of Georgia, Georgia State University, and Georgia Southern University.

The only women that had attended Georgia Tech did so through the School of Commerce. After it was removed in 1931, women were not able to enroll at Tech until president Blake R. Van Leer successfully pushed through a second attempt to do so in 1952. After the first women were admitted to Tech, the presidents wife Ella Lillian Wall Van Leer complimented this with a support network for women at Tech. She lobbied the Women's Chamber of Commerce to set up the first scholarship for female students. Ella would later encourage Alpha Xi Delta to set up an official chapter in 1954, however they lacked the 25 students necessary for a chapter. The sorority made a special exception and officially founded a chapter at a private ceremony hosted by the Van Leers. This would be the first sorority at an engineering school. The president's daughter Maryly Van Leer Peck was National Chair of Student Affairs at Society of Women Engineers at the time and helped Tech set up a chapter near campus. In 1952 women could only enroll in programs not offered at other universities in Georgia. In 1968 the board of regents voted to allow women to enroll in all programs at Tech. Also in 1968, Helen E. Grenga became Georgia Tech's first full-tenured female engineering professor. The first women's dorm, Fulmer Hall, opened in 1969. Women constituted 31.1 percent of the undergraduates and 25.5 percent of the graduate students enrolled in fall 2010.

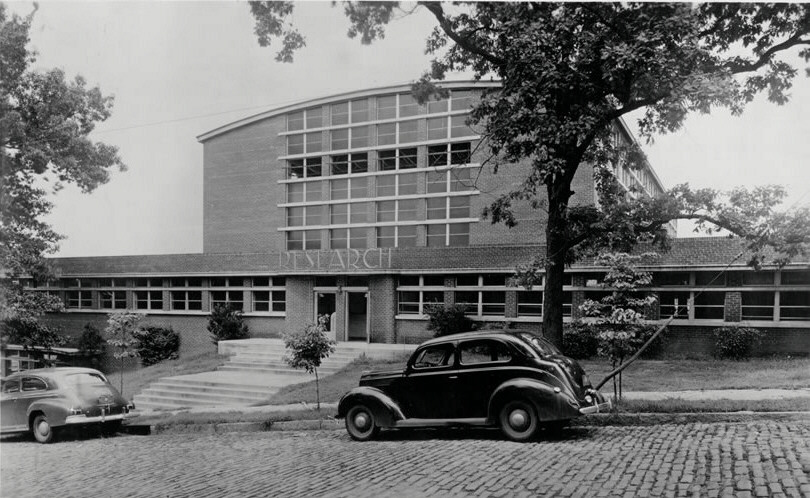
The Hinman Research Building, which housed much of the Georgia Tech Research Institute at this time

Glen P. Robinson and six other Georgia Tech researchers (including Robinson's former professor and future EES director Jim Boyd and EES director Gerald Rosselot) each contributed $100 to found Scientific Associates (later known as Scientific Atlanta) on October 31, 1951, with the initial goal of marketing antenna structures developed by the radar branch of the EES. Robinson worked as the general manager without pay for the first year; after the fledgling company's first contract resulted in a $4,000 loss, Robinson (upon request) refunded five of the six other initial investors. Despite its rocky start, the company managed to succeed. In 1951, there was a dispute over station finances and Rosselot's hand in the foundation of Scientific Atlanta against Georgia Tech vice president Cherry Emerson. Initially, Rosselot was president and CEO of Scientific Atlanta, but later handed off responsibility to Robinson; at issue were potential conflicts of interest with his role at Georgia Tech and what, if any, role Georgia Tech should have in technology transfer to the marketplace. Rosselot eventually resigned his post at Georgia Tech, but his participation ensured the eventual success of Scientific Atlanta and made way for further technology transfer efforts by Georgia Tech's VentureLab and the Advanced Technology Development Center.

This period also saw a significant expansion in Georgia Tech's postgraduate education programs, driven largely by the Cold War and the launch of Sputnik; this effort received substantial support from the EES. Despite its slow start, with the first Master of Science programs in the 1920s and the first doctorate in 1946, the program became firmly established. In 1952 alone, around 80 students earned graduate degrees while working at EES. Herschel H. Cudd, EES director from 1952 to 1954, created a new promotion system for researchers that is still in use. Many EES researchers held the title of professor despite lacking a doctorate (or a comparable qualification for promotion as determined by the Georgia Board of Regents), something that irritated members of the teaching faculty. The new system, approved in spring 1953, used the board of regents' qualifications for promotion and mirrored the academic tenure track.

=== Sugar Bowl controversy ===
After a successful (8–1–1) football season in 1955, Tech was invited to play in the 1956 Sugar Bowl in New Orleans against the University of Pittsburgh. It would be the school's fifth straight bowl appearance under renowned coach Bobby Dodd. Pittsburgh had a black starting player, fullback Bobby Grier, but as Tech had played a 1953 game against a desegregated Notre Dame team, and the University of Georgia had very recently played out-of-state games against desegregated opponents, president Van Leer and the Tech Athletic Association saw the game's contract as acceptable. However, racial tension in the South was high following the recent Brown v. Board of Education decision. Georgia Governor Marvin Griffin had privately given Dodd and Van Leer his support, but he surprised the campus and the state on Friday, December 2, 1955, by bowing to pressure from segregationists and sending a wire to the Georgia Board of Regents chairman, Robert O. Arnold, requesting not only that Tech not play the game, but that all University System of Georgia teams play only segregated games and to cut all funding to schools who admit students who adhere to integration. Griffin publicly put a great deal of pressure on president Blake R. Van Leer to pull out.:

It is my request that athletic teams of units of the University System of Georgia not be permitted to engage in contests with other teams where the races are mixed on such teams or where segregation is not required among spectators at such events. The South stands at Armageddon. The battle is joined. We cannot make the slightest concession to the enemy in this dark and lamentable hour of struggle. There is no more difference in compromising integrity of race on the playing field than doing so in the classrooms. One break in the dike and the relentless seas will rush in and destroy us. We are in this fight 100 percent; not 98 percent, nor 75 percent, not 64 percent– but a full 100 percent. An immediate called meeting of the State Board of Regents to act on my request is vitally necessary at this time.

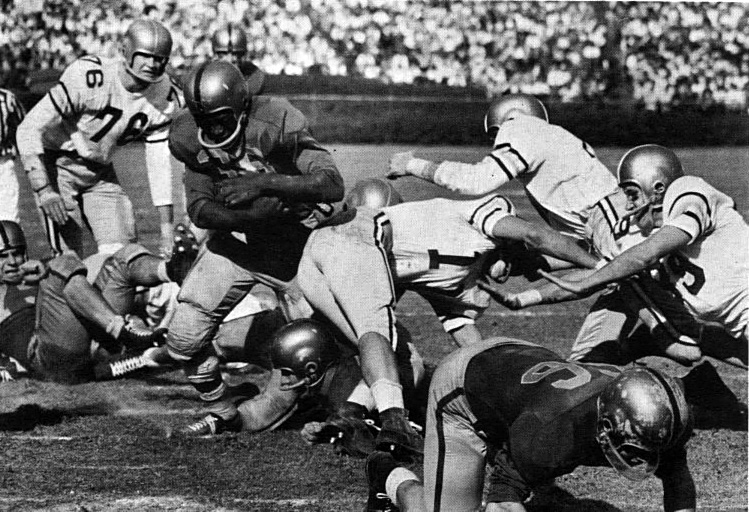
Bobby Grier at the controversial 1956 Sugar Bowl

Enraged, Tech students organized an impromptu protest rally on campus. At midnight, a large group of students hung the governor in effigy and ignited a bonfire. They then marched to Five Points, the Georgia State Capitol, and the Georgia Governor's Mansion, hanging the governor in effigy at each location. The students did some minor damage to the Governor's Mansion before the march was dispersed by state representative "Muggsy" Smith at 3:30 am.

After receiving death threats about the game, Van Leer's made a comment to the media came on Saturday, December 3, 1955: "I am 60 years old and I have never broken a contract. I do not intend to start now". At a tense meeting of the board of regents on Monday, Van Leer threatened to resign and it was decided that Georgia Tech would be allowed to play in the Sugar Bowl. Another state representative John P Drinkard recommended that all of Georgia Tech's state funding be cut off if they proceed and later Griffin suggested anyone who adhered to the principles of integration should not be admitted to Tech. The new policy was that "all laws, customs and traditions of host states would be respected but all games played in Georgia would be segregated", a policy that would remain until 1963. The regents, with the exception of Tech alumnus David Rice, condemned the "riotous" behavior of Tech students. Rice instead criticized Marvin Griffin, and was lauded by The Technique as the "only man with the moral conviction to stand up against Griffin, ... and co". Ironically, Tech defeated Pittsburgh 7–0 because of a pass interference call on the black player. Van Leer died three weeks after this incident, on January 23, 1956; the stress of the controversy was believed to have shortened his life.

== Integration and expansion (1956–1972) ==
After Van Leer's death, Paul Weber served as acting president from January 1956 to August 1957, while still holding the title of Dean of Faculties; it was difficult to find a permanent replacement due to discriminatory state laws and the looming issue of integration, along with a salary gap between Georgia Tech and comparable institutions. Weber's short tenure as acting president saw significantly increased enrollment standards, efforts by the Georgia Tech Foundation to increase faculty salaries, and further campus expansion including the Alexander Memorial Coliseum, which was completed and dedicated on October 27, 1956. Weber left larger organizational changes and integration for his eventual successor. After the selection of a replacement in the University of Toledo's Dean of Engineering, Edwin D. Harrison, Weber remained a Georgia Tech administrator and was named vice president for Planning in 1966. Around 1960, state law mandated "an immediate cut-off of state funds to any white institution that admitted a black student". At a meeting in the Old Gym on January 17, 1961, an overwhelming majority of the 2,741 students present voted to endorse integration of qualified applicants, regardless of race. Three years after the meeting, and one year after the University of Georgia's violent integration, Georgia Tech became the first university in the Deep South to desegregate without a court order, with Ford Greene, Ralph A. Long Jr., and Lawrence Michael Williams becoming Georgia Tech's first three African-American students; they registered for class on September 18, 1961, and started class on September 20. Members of the press were barred from the campus to discourage disruptive behavior, and plainclothes police officers were placed on the campus. The ANAK Society claims to have met with their families and discreetly kept an eye on the students once they enrolled to ensure peaceful integration.

There was little reaction to this by Tech students who, like the city of Atlanta described by former mayor William Hartsfield, were "too busy to hate". On the first day, the Ku Klux Klan came to Georgia Tech, marched up North Avenue, and picketed Harrison's house, staying just long enough to have their pictures taken. Lester Maddox chose to close his restaurant (near Georgia Tech's modern-day Burger Bowl) rather than desegregate, after losing a year-long legal battle in which he challenged the constitutionality of the public accommodations section (Title II) of the Civil Rights Act of 1964. In 1965, John Gill became The Technique's first black editor, and Tech's first black professor, William Peace, joined the faculty of the Department of Social Sciences in 1968.

The Ramblin' Wreck, the iconic 1930 Ford Model A Sport coupe that serves as the official mascot of the student body, was acquired in this era. The Wreck is present at all major sporting events and student body functions, and leads the football team into Bobby Dodd Stadium at Historic Grant Field, a duty it has performed since 1961. Dean of Student Affairs Jim Dull recognized a need for an official Ramblin' Wreck when he observed the student body's fascination with classic cars. Fraternities, in particular, would parade around their House Wrecks as displays of school spirit and enthusiasm. It was considered a rite of passage to own a broken-down vehicle. In 1960, Dull began a search for a new official symbol to represent the institute. He specifically wanted a classic pre-war Ford. Dull's search employed newspaper ads, radio commercials, and other means to locate this vehicle. The search took him throughout the state and country, but no suitable vehicle was found until the autumn of 1960 when Dull spotted a polished 1930 Ford Model A outside of his apartment located in Towers Dormitory. The owner was Captain Ted J. Johnson, Atlanta's chief Delta Air Lines pilot. When Johnson returned to his car, he found a note from Dull attached to his windshield. Dull's note offered to purchase the car to serve as Georgia Tech's official mascot. Johnson, after great deliberation, agreed to take $1,000; he eventually returned the money in 1984 so that the car would be remembered as an official donation to Georgia Tech and the Alexander-Tharpe Fund. The Ramblin' Wreck was officially transferred to the Athletic Association on May 26, 1961.

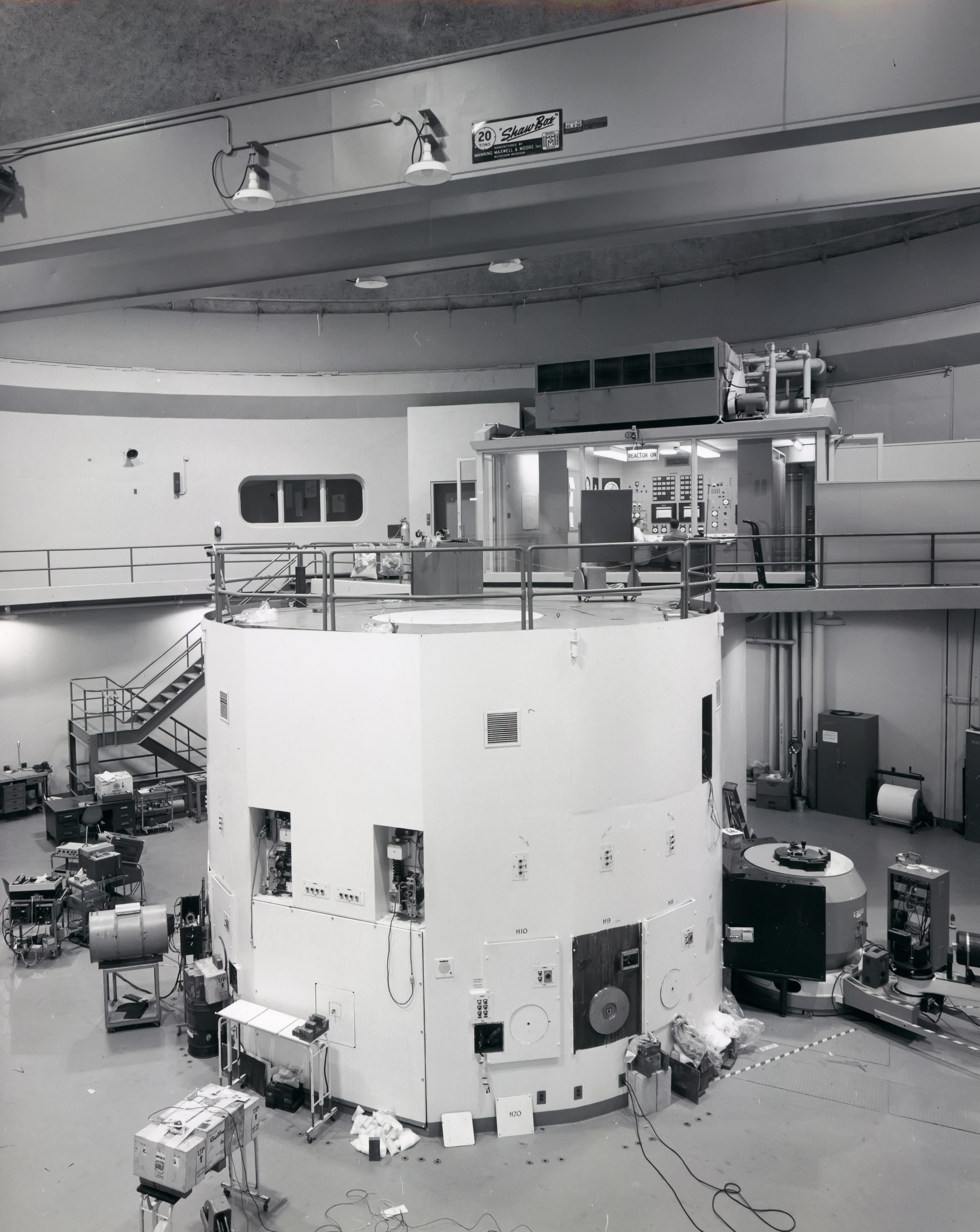
The $4.5-million Neely Research Reactor, which was built in 1963 in part due to James E. Boyd's influence

James E. Boyd, assistant director of research at the Engineering Experiment Station since 1954, was appointed director of the station from July 1, 1957, a post in which he served until 1961. While at Tech, Boyd wrote an influential article about the role of research centers at institutes of technology, which argued that research should be integrated with education; he correspondingly involved undergraduates in his research. Under Boyd's purview, the EES gained many electronics-related contracts, to the extent that an Electronics Division was created in 1959; it would focus on radar and communications. The establishment of research facilities was also championed by Boyd. In 1955, Van Leer had appointed Boyd to Georgia Tech's Nuclear Science Committee, which recommended the creation of a Radioisotopes Laboratory Facility and a large research reactor. The $4.5 million ($47.3 million in 2025) Frank H. Neely Research Reactor would be completed in 1963 and would operate until 1996.

Harrison's administration also addressed the disparity between salaries at Georgia Tech and competing institutions. This was solved via the "Joint Tech-Georgia Development Fund" developed by the Georgia Tech Alumni Association in 1967, which supplemented salaries of faculty at both Georgia Tech and UGA and worked to attract high-quality faculty members to both schools.

Students across the nation protested the Vietnam War, including at similar institutions such as the Massachusetts Institute of Technology, where students picketed and blocked access to the Draper Laboratory that was producing guidance systems for the Poseidon missile. While The Technique did publish editorials against the United States' involvement, the Student Council easily defeated a bill endorsing the Vietnam Moratorium in the fall of 1969. There were significant protests at other institutions that conducted military research, but there were no protests against the military electronics research at the Georgia Tech Research Institute.

There was similar nationwide concern over the United States' involvement in the Cambodian Civil War, resulting in the Kent State shootings, which in turn caused about 450 colleges to suspend classes. In Georgia, the student response was largely restrained. Several hundred students at the University of Georgia marched on the home of president Frederick Corbet Davison demanding that the school be closed; consequently, all schools in the University System of Georgia were closed on May 8 and 9. While there were no protests at Tech, the students were still concerned over the events at Kent State; on May 8, four hundred students and faculty filled Bertha Square for a student-organized memorial, after which the students left quietly.

A 1965 plan signaled the beginning of Tech's expansion to include what is now West Campus. The area west of Hemphill Avenue, for decades the campus' western border, was then a working-class multiracial neighborhood, and Hemphill itself was a major city thoroughfare connecting Buckhead, the Atlantic Steel Mill, Techwood Homes and Downtown. In July 1968, Harrison resigned to the surprise of many in the Georgia Tech community; it was leaked to the press prior to his official announcement, and he subsequently released a public statement, saying that "ten years was long enough to be president of one university". The true reasons stemmed from his reorganization of the campus administration, and difficulties between Harrison and the Georgia Board of Regents and its chancellor over long-term goals and procedures.

On July 1, 1968, Vernon D. Crawford became dean of the institute's General College. In March 1969, Harrison announced that he would take a leave of absence until his resignation was effective; Chancellor George L. Simpson subsequently announced that Crawford would be the interim president. One notable development during Crawford's term was the advancement of the School of Industrial Management to a college. In 1966, Arthur G. Hansen, then a chairman of the University of Michigan's mechanical engineering department, was named Georgia Tech's Dean of Engineering. On August 1, 1969, Hansen became the institute's next president, a post he held until his resignation on July 1, 1971, to become president of his alma mater, Purdue University.

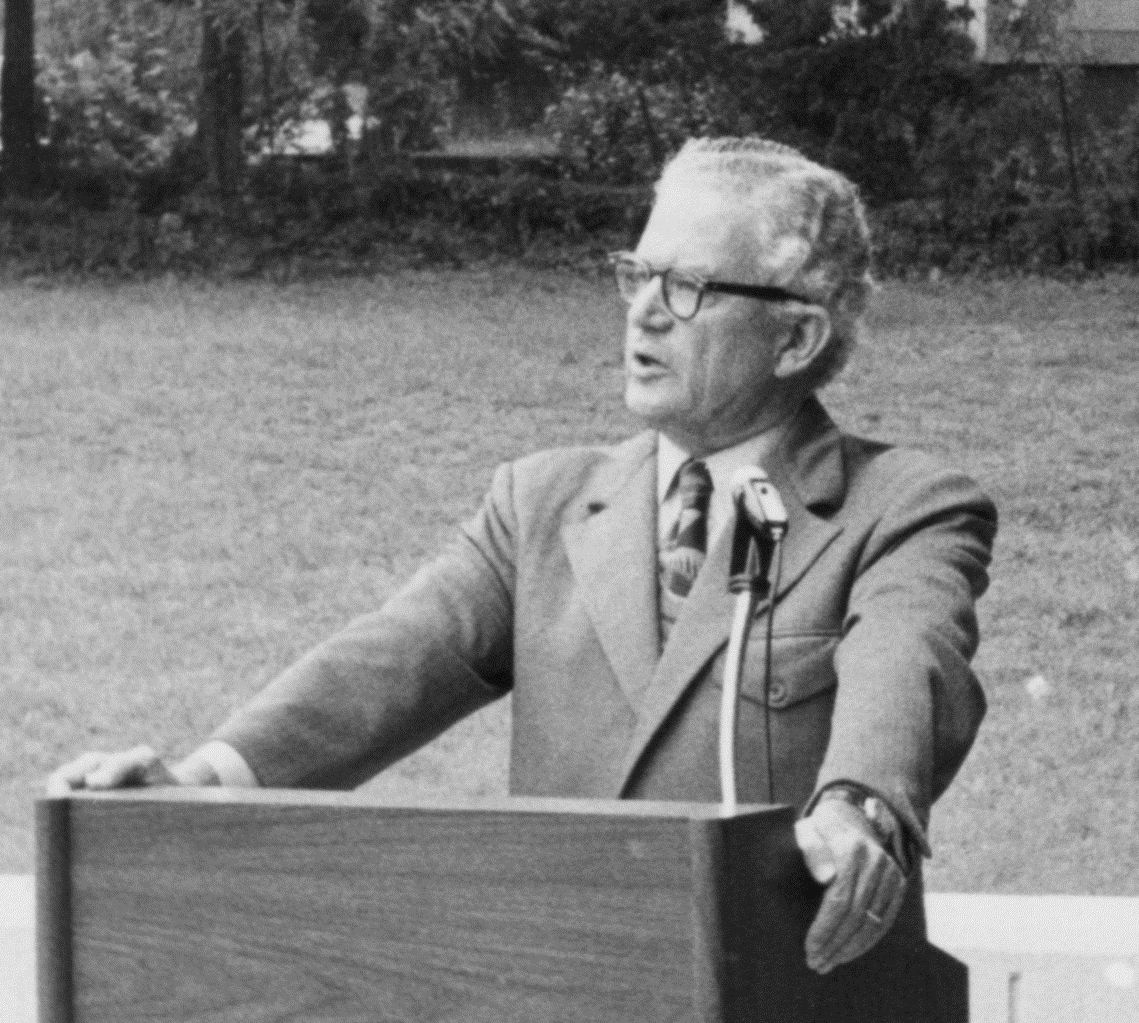
James E. Boyd speaking at Georgia Tech

James E. Boyd, who had assumed the vice chancellorship of the University System of Georgia the previous month, was appointed acting president of Georgia Tech by Chancellor George L. Simpson in May 1971. Simpson's selection of Boyd as interim president was influenced by Boyd's previous experience as an academic administrator, his experience as director of the Engineering Experiment Station, and his ongoing position on the station's board of directors. The chancellor hoped this combination would help resolve a brewing controversy over whether the EES should be integrated into Georgia Tech's academic units to improve both entities' competitiveness for federal money.

The EES had sizable and growing support from the state of Georgia and its Industrial Development Council, which developed products and methods and provided technical assistance for Georgia industry. However, due in part to efforts made by Boyd and previous station director Gerald Rosselot, the station increasingly relied on electronics research funding from the federal government. In 1971, funding to both Georgia Tech's academic units and the EES began to suffer due to a sharp decline in state funds combined with cuts to federal science, research, and education funding after the end of the Space Race funding boom. Similar institutions, such as the Battelle Memorial Institute, Stanford Research Institute, and the Illinois Institute of Technology Research Institute had weathered this storm by becoming exceedingly good at obtaining research contracts.

Boyd's predecessor Arthur G. Hansen's "bold and controversial" solution to both entities' problems was to completely integrate the station into Georgia Tech's academic units. On paper, this would dramatically increase Georgia Tech's stated research funding (as all of it would be performed through the academic units), and it would increase options and financial aid for graduate students. Another, less publicized, reason was that Georgia Tech would gain access to the contract organization's reserve fund, (Note: The Engineering Experiment Station was renamed the Georgia Tech Research Institute in 1984. A separate organization, originally called the Industrial Development Council, changed its name to the Georgia Tech Research Institute in February 1946, and finally to the Georgia Tech Research Corporation in 1984. There are legal difficulties when an American university wishes to accept contracts from some entities, especially the federal government, so the second organization is a contracting organization. Most importantly, it allows the university to perform multi-year contracts that are not possible under state law, which requires that money received must be spent in the same fiscal year.) which was said to be over $1 million ($8.3 million in 2025). Thomas E. Stelson, Dean of the College of Engineering at Georgia Tech, was named to "reorganize" the station. Publicly, Stelson's task was simply to recommend a plan for reorganization, but the administration clearly intended for Georgia Tech and the EES to be closely integrated. Maurice W. Long, who was director of the station at the time, viewed the move as a violation of the EES's charter as legislatively established by the Georgia General Assembly in 1919, and asserted that Georgia Tech did not have the authority to merge the two institutions. EES employees and business executives involved with the station appealed to the Georgia Board of Regents and to Governor of Georgia Jimmy Carter (himself a Georgia Tech alumnus); the controversy received coverage in both The Technique and The Atlanta Constitution.

This was the climate into which Boyd entered as interim institute president after Hansen had announced, on April 27, 1971, that he would be departing Georgia Tech to become president of Purdue University on July 1 of that year. Boyd stopped the plan for absolute absorption of the station, but did allow plans for closer control and more aggressive contract solicitation to proceed. Among these measures were increased resource-sharing, including increased sharing of physical assets and research staff. The latter was evidenced by the increase in joint faculty appointments between the EES and Georgia Tech. The move paid off, and the fiscal year 1970–1971 saw EES win new contracts and grants, totaling a record $5.2 million ($41.3 million 2025).

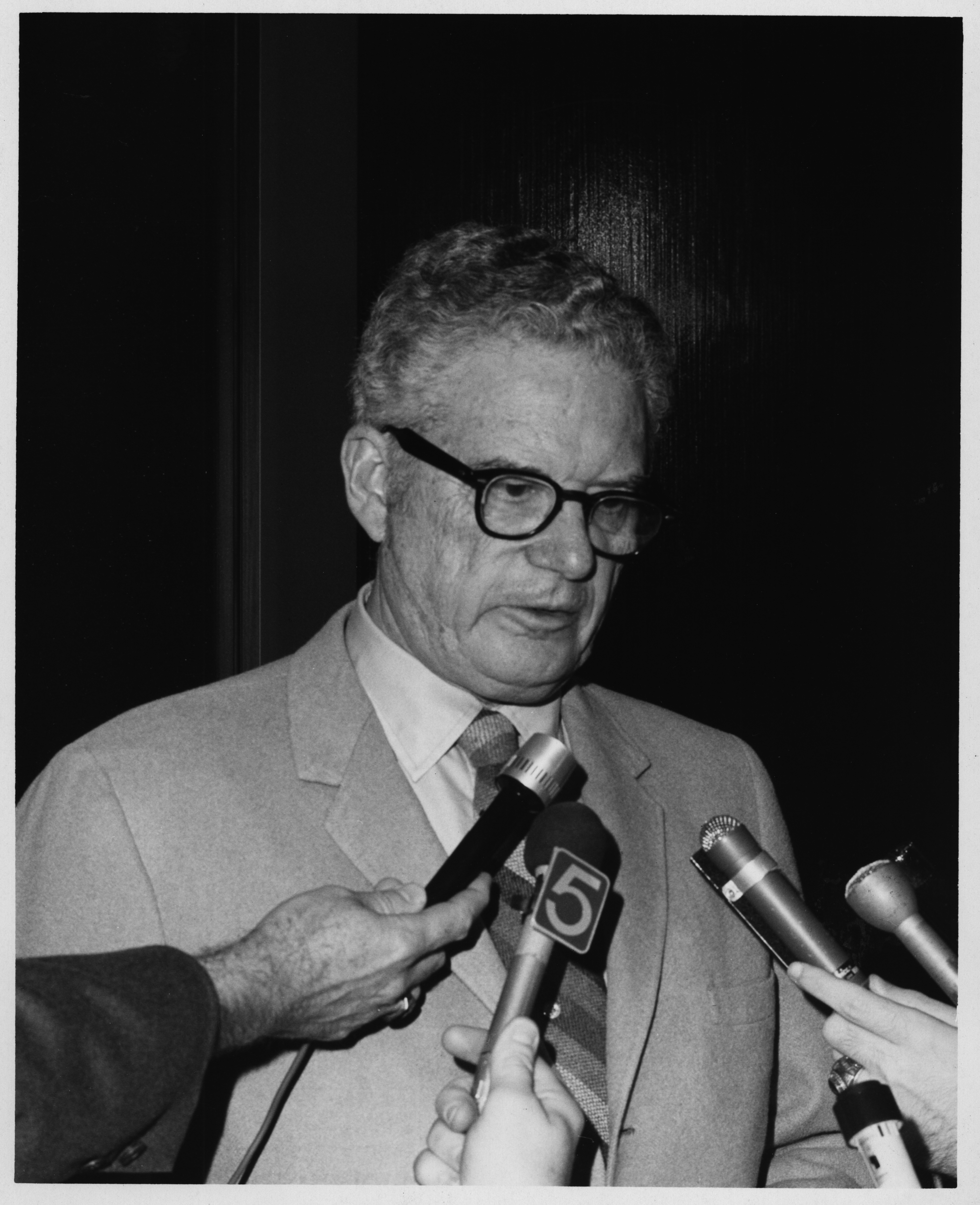
Boyd speaking to the media

Boyd had to deal with intense public pressure to fire Yellow Jackets football coach Bud Carson. Georgia Tech alumni – accustomed to success under football legends John Heisman (whose career wins–losses–draws statistics were 185–70–17), William A. Alexander (134–95–15) and Bobby Dodd (165–64–8) – made repeated calls for Carson's dismissal. The complaints were based on a long list of infractions, including "mistreating and humiliating students" and "unsportsmanlike conduct", but the most important issue was his 27–27 record. The last straw was his 6–6 season in 1971, which included both a loss to Georgia Tech's longtime rival, the Georgia Bulldogs, and to the 1971 Ole Miss Rebels football team in the 1971 Peach Bowl. As institute president, Boyd chaired the board of directors of the Georgia Tech Athletic Association, which had been suffering both in win percentage and in finances.

Traditional sources of Athletic Association income, primarily ticket sales, had declined as a result of both the Yellow Jackets' poor record and the relatively recent establishment of professional football in Atlanta, namely the Atlanta Falcons. Bobby Dodd, then athletic director, had warned for years that Georgia Tech's rising academic standards and its limited curriculum would affect the athletic program. At a meeting on January 8, 1972, the Athletic Association board, led by Boyd, ignored a 42-page list of "charges" drafted by an alumnus, but nevertheless voted to not renew Carson's contract, making him the first Georgia Tech coach to be fired. The board also voted to not accept Bobby Dodd's resignation, which had been offered at the meeting. Carson went on to have a successful career, particularly with the Pittsburgh Steelers. On January 21, 1972, Boyd announced that Bill Fulcher had been selected as the new football head coach. This would not change the Georgia Tech Athletic Association's fortunes, however; after Carson's departure, the on-field and financial problems remained.

Georgia Tech's mascot Buzz got his start in the 1970s. The original Georgia Tech Yellow Jacket mascot was Judi McNair who donned a homemade yellowjacket costume in 1972 and performed at home football games. She rode on the Ramblin' Wreck and appears in the 1972 Georgia Tech Blueprint yearbook. McNair's mascot was considered a great idea, as it was a big hit with the fans. In 1979, McNair's idea for a Yellow Jacket was reintroduced by another Georgia Tech student, Richie Bland. Bland, who was apparently unaware of McNair's prior initiative, paid $1,400 to have a local theme park costume designer make a yellowjacket costume that he first wore at a pep rally prior to the Tennessee football game. Rather than obtain permission from Georgia Tech as Judi had done in 1972, this student simply sneaked onto the field in costume during a football game and ran across the field. The fans believed that this costumed character was acting as an official member of the cheerleading squad and responded accordingly. By 1980, this new incarnation of the yellow jacket mascot was given the name Buzz Bee and was adopted as an official mascot by Georgia Tech. This new Buzz character would be the model for a new Georgia Tech emblem, designed in 1985 by Mike Lester.

== Research expansion (1972–1987) ==
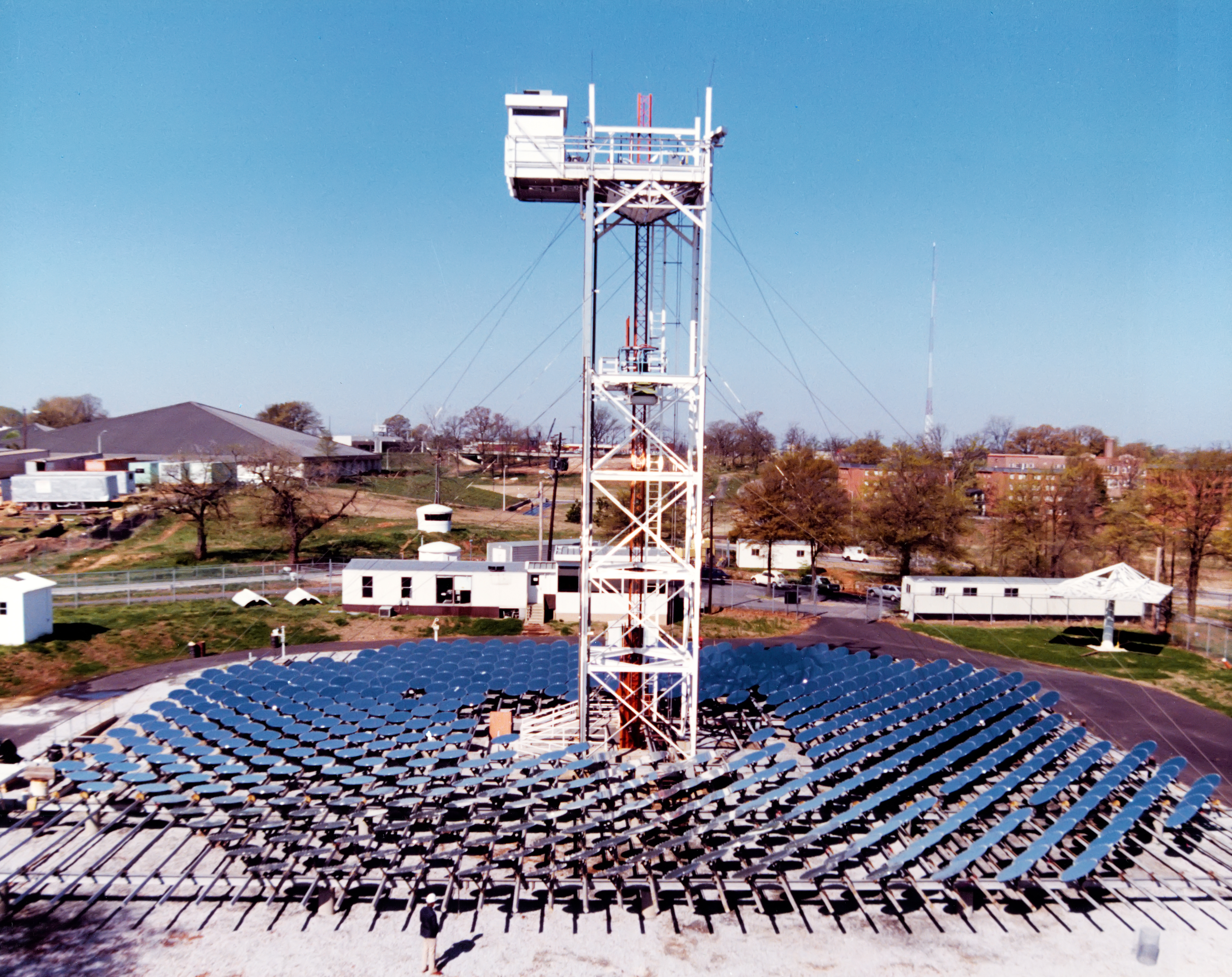
A solar furnace on the Georgia Tech campus in 1979

Joseph M. Pettit became president of the Georgia Institute of Technology in 1972. During his 14-year tenure as president, Pettit was credited with turning Georgia Tech into a top-flight research institution. Pettit has also received credit for shifting Georgia Tech back to its roots with regards to providing assistance with economic development within the state of Georgia. In the decades known for the Vietnam War and the launch of Sputnik, research at Georgia Tech and the Georgia Tech Research Institute had become so tied with NASA and the Department of Defense that local industrial development had been largely forgotten.

During Pettit's tenure, the institute progressed into the top tier of technological education institutions. Under his leadership, Tech's research budget surpassed the $100 million mark for the first time in its history. Thomas E. Stelson was Georgia Tech's vice president for Research from 1974 to 1988. Faced with a longstanding cultural war over the relative merits of basic research versus applied research, Stelson emphasized the importance of both. An increased focus on research activities allowed more funding for academics, which allowed the school's ranking to start a long and continuing rise from that of the 1920s. Stelson simultaneously served as the interim director of the Georgia Tech Research Institute from 1975 to 1976, during which time he reorganized the station into eight semi-autonomous laboratories in order to allow each to develop a specialization and clientele—a model that GTRI retains (with slight modifications) to this day.

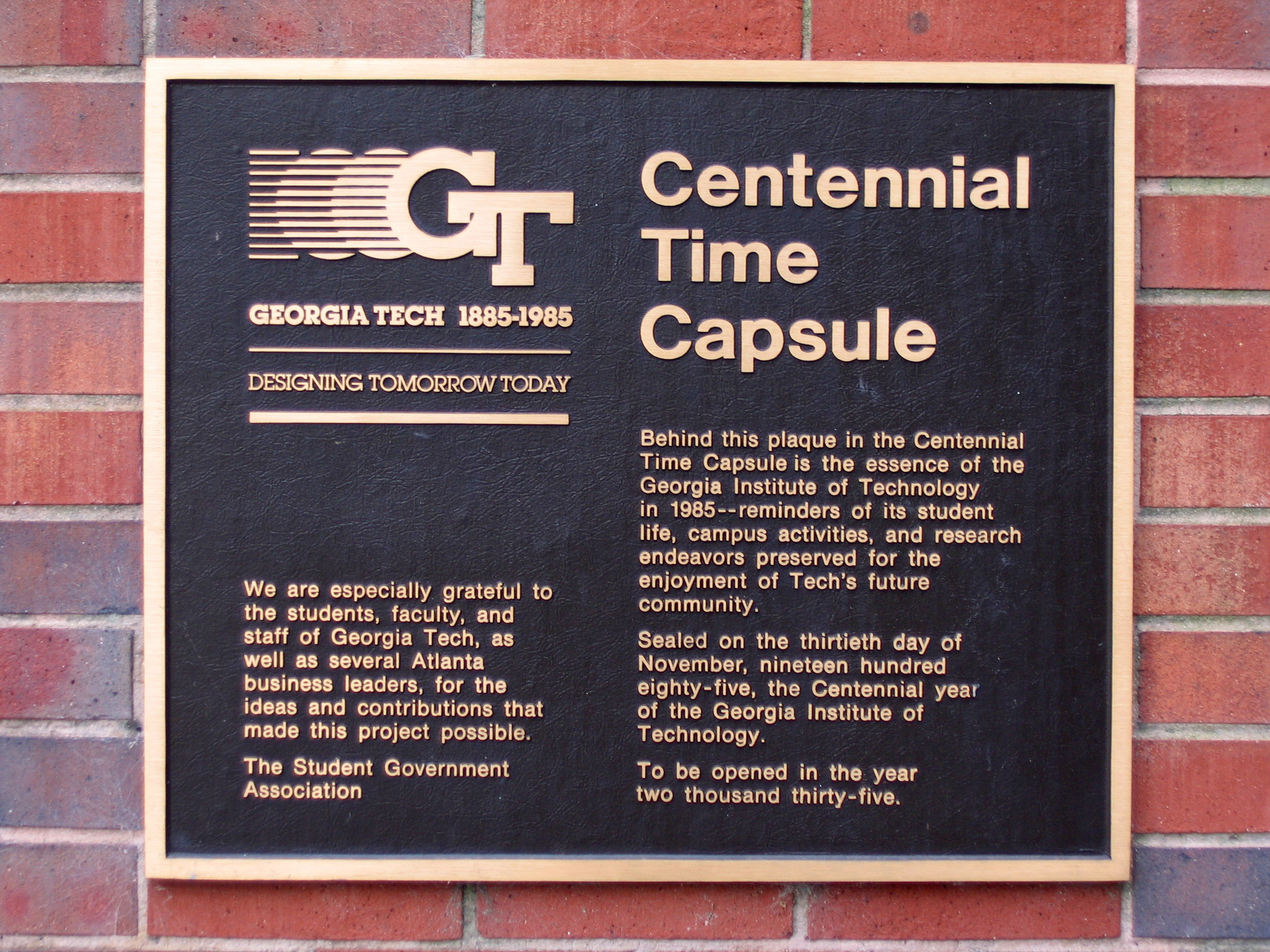
A time capsule built into a wall of Georgia Tech's student center

In the aftermath of the launch of Scientific Atlanta and the subsequent disputes, Georgia Tech's culture encouraged hard work, but did not encourage start-ups. This changed during Pettit's administration; Pettit was at Stanford during the development of the Silicon Valley and worked to change the culture to inspire something similar in Atlanta. "That was when Tech began actively encouraging faculty, staff and students to be entrepreneurial ... In some ways it was a shift back to our roots, with Tech beginning to reconnect with the state through the Advanced Technology Development Center, the Economic Development Institute and the Georgia Research Alliance", according to former Tech history professor Bob McMath.

Pettit also oversaw Georgia Tech's application and admittance into the Atlantic Coast Conference (ACC), an athletic league founded in 1953 which included seven charter members. Georgia Tech had withdrawn from the Southeastern Conference in January 1964 and had operated as an Independent until 1975 when Georgia Tech joined the Metro Conference. Georgia Tech was admitted to the ACC on April 3, 1978. The ACC has expanded from 8 to 12 members since that time.

The institute celebrated its centennial in 1985. Pettit and J. Erskine Love Jr. spearheaded Tech's $100-million Centennial Campaign. A total of $202.7 million was raised during the Centennial Campaign, which was Georgia Tech's largest single fundraising effort to that date. Among other centennial observances, a time capsule was placed in the Student Center, and a team of historians wrote a comprehensive guide to Georgia Tech's history, Engineering the New South: Georgia Tech 1885–1985. (Note: A companion course was taught that year by two of the book's six authors. The course was offered again in 1999 as a swan song to the quarter system.) In 1986, Pettit died of cancer, and Henry C. Bourne Jr. served as interim president.

== Restructuring controversy (1987–1994) ==
President John Patrick Crecine proposed a controversial restructuring in 1988. The institute at that point had three colleges: the College of Engineering, the College of Management, and the catch-all COSALS, the College of Sciences and Liberal arts. Crecine reorganized the latter two into the College of Computing, the College of Sciences, and the Ivan Allen College of Management, Policy, and International Affairs. Crecine announced the changes without asking for input, and consequently many faculty members disliked him for his top-down management style. The administration sent out ballots in 1989, and the proposed changes passed with very slim margins. The restructuring took effect in January 1990. While Crecine was seen in a poor light at the time, the changes he made are considered visionary. In January 1994, Crecine resigned.

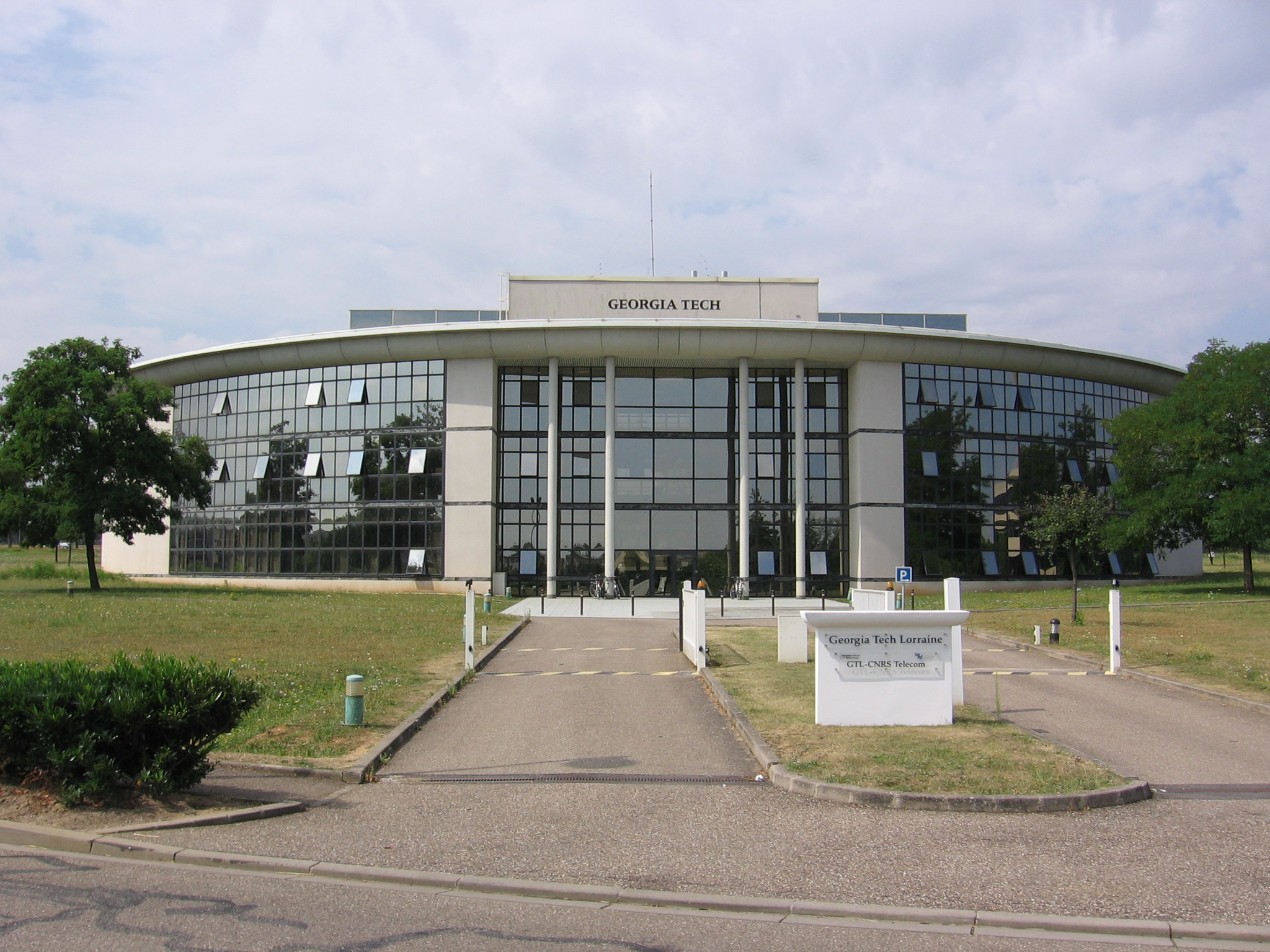
Georgia Tech's first campus outside of the US, Georgia Tech Lorraine

In October 1990, Tech opened its first overseas campus, Georgia Tech Lorraine (GTL). A non-profit corporation operating under French law, GTL primarily focuses on graduate education, sponsored research, and an undergraduate summer program. In 1997 GTL was sued on the grounds that the course descriptions on its internet site did not comply with the Toubon Law, which requires that advertisements must be provided in French. The case was dismissed on a technicality; the GTL site subsequently offers course descriptions in English, French and German.

Crecine was instrumental in securing the 1996 Summer Olympics for Atlanta. In September 1989 he imagined a grand multimedia presentation for the International Olympic Committee (IOC). The resulting 3-D presentation, developed by the institute's Multimedia Laboratory, provided a "1996" view of Atlanta, complete with digitized graphic models of non-existent facilities overlaid on their proposed sites. More than 40 Georgia Tech computer scientists were recruited to assemble the virtual reality, three-dimensional tour through Olympic venues that had not yet even been designed. The term "virtual reality" was almost unknown in 1989 when Tech's seven-foot tall, three-screen, 3-D interactive video and laser disc projection system debuted during a meeting of the IOC at San Juan, Puerto Rico. Members of the committee used a trackball and a touch screen to view a dazzling montage of animation, computer graphics, aerial photography, video, and satellite topographical photographs created to depict Atlanta during the Centennial Olympic Games. Many believe the presentation showed the IOC that Atlanta was a major player in its Olympics bid and served to create the foundation for the city's high-tech theme for the Centennial Games.

After Atlanta won the Olympics bid, a dramatic amount of construction occurred, creating most of what is now considered "West Campus" in order for Tech to serve as the Olympic Village. The Undergraduate Living Center, Fourth Street Apartments, Sixth Street Apartments, Eighth Street Apartments, Hemphill Apartments (now known as Crecine Apartments), and Center Street Apartments housed athletes and journalists. The Georgia Tech Aquatic Center was built for swimming events, and the Alexander Memorial Coliseum was renovated.

== Modern history (1994–present) ==
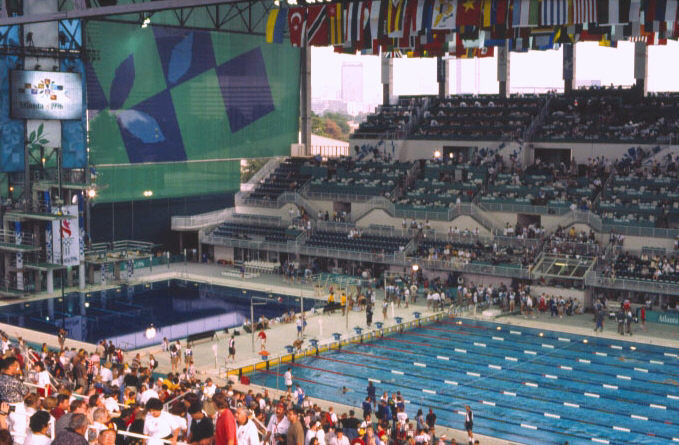
The Georgia Tech Aquatic Center during the 1996 Summer Olympics

In 1994, G. Wayne Clough became the first Tech alumnus to serve as the president of the institute. The 1996 Summer Olympics took place in Atlanta early in Clough's tenure. In 1998, he split the Ivan Allen College of Management, Policy, and International Affairs, creating the Ivan Allen College of Liberal Arts and returning the College of Management to "College" status. During his tenure, research expenditures increased from $212 million to $425 million, enrollment increased from 13,000 to 18,000, Tech received the Hesburgh Award, and Tech's U.S. News & World Report rankings steadily improved.

Clough's tenure especially focused on a dramatic expansion and modernization of the institute. Coinciding with the rise of personal computers, computer ownership became mandatory for all students in 1997. In 1998, Georgia Tech was the first university in the Southeastern United States to provide its fraternity and sorority houses with internet access. A campus wireless network, the Local Area Wireless/Walkup Network (LAWN), was established in 1999; it now covers most of the campus.

In 1999, Georgia Tech began offering local degree programs to engineering students in Southeast Georgia. In 2003 Tech established a physical campus in Savannah, Georgia, called Georgia Tech Savannah. Clough's administration also focused on improved undergraduate research opportunities and the creation of an "International Plan" degree option that requires students to spend two terms abroad and take internationally focused courses. In addition, Clough spearheaded the creation of a fund to make Georgia Tech more affordable for low-income students (the G. Wayne Clough Georgia Tech Promise Program).

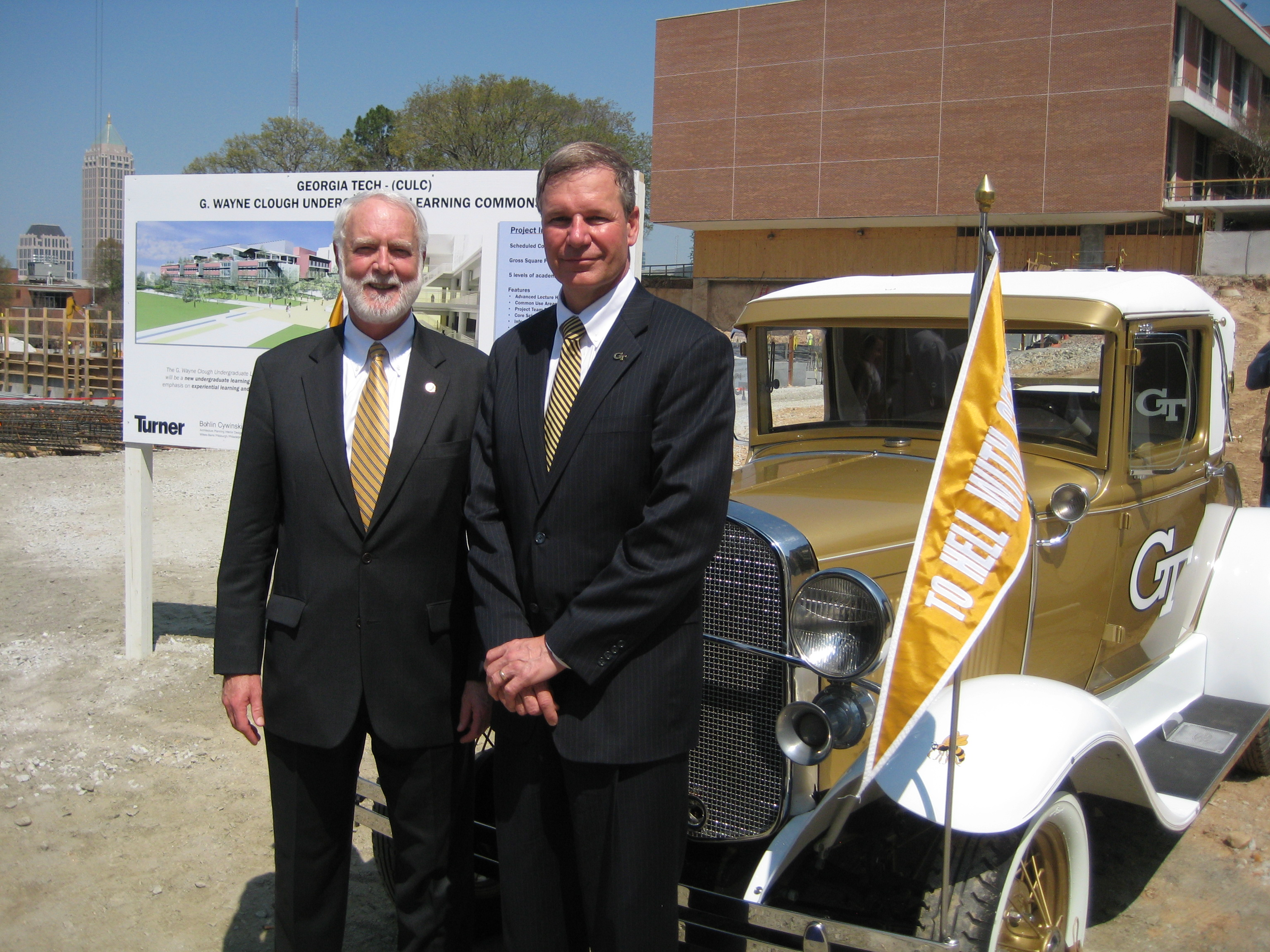
President Emeritus G. Wayne Clough (left) and President G. P. "Bud" Peterson (right) in front of the Ramblin' Wreck on the site of the Clough Undergraduate Learning Commons at its 2010 groundbreaking

The master plan for the school's physical growth and development—created in 1912 and significantly revised in 1952, 1965, and 1991—saw two further revisions under Clough's guidance in 1997 and 2002. While Clough was in office, around $1 billion was spent on expanding and improving the campus. These projects include the construction of the Manufacturing Related Disciplines Complex, 10th and Home, Tech Square, The Biomedical Complex, the completion and subsequent renovations of several west campus dorms, the Student Center renovation, the expanded 5th Street Bridge, the Georgia Tech Aquatic Center's renovation into the CRC, the new Health Center, the Klaus Advanced Computing Building, the Molecular Science and Engineering Building, and the Nanotechnology Research Center.

The school has also taken care to maintain its Historic District, with several projects dedicated to the preservation or improvement of Tech Tower, the school's first and oldest building and its primary administrative center. As part of Phase I of the Georgia Tech Master Plan of 1997, the area was made more pedestrian-friendly by the removal of access roads and the addition of landscaping improvements, benches, and other facilities. The National Register of Historic Places has listed the Georgia Tech Historic District since 1978. In the 2007 "Best of Tech" issue of The Technique, students voted "construction" as Georgia Tech's worst tradition.

On March 15, 2008, Clough was appointed to lead the Smithsonian Institution, effective July 1, 2008. Gary Schuster, Tech's provost and executive vice president for academic affairs, was named interim president, effective July 1, 2008. On February 9, 2009, George P. "Bud" Peterson, chancellor of the University of Colorado at Boulder, was named the finalist in the presidential search; he took office on September 3, 2009. On April 20, 2010, Georgia Tech was invited to join the Association of American Universities, as the first new member institution in nine years.

In 2011, Georgia Tech opened the G. Wayne Clough Undergraduate Learning Commons building named in honor of his commitment to undergraduate students; it was dedicated on his birthday, September 24, 2011. In 2012, Ernest Scheller Jr. gave a $50-million gift that led to the renaming of the Georgia Tech College of Management to the Scheller College of Business.

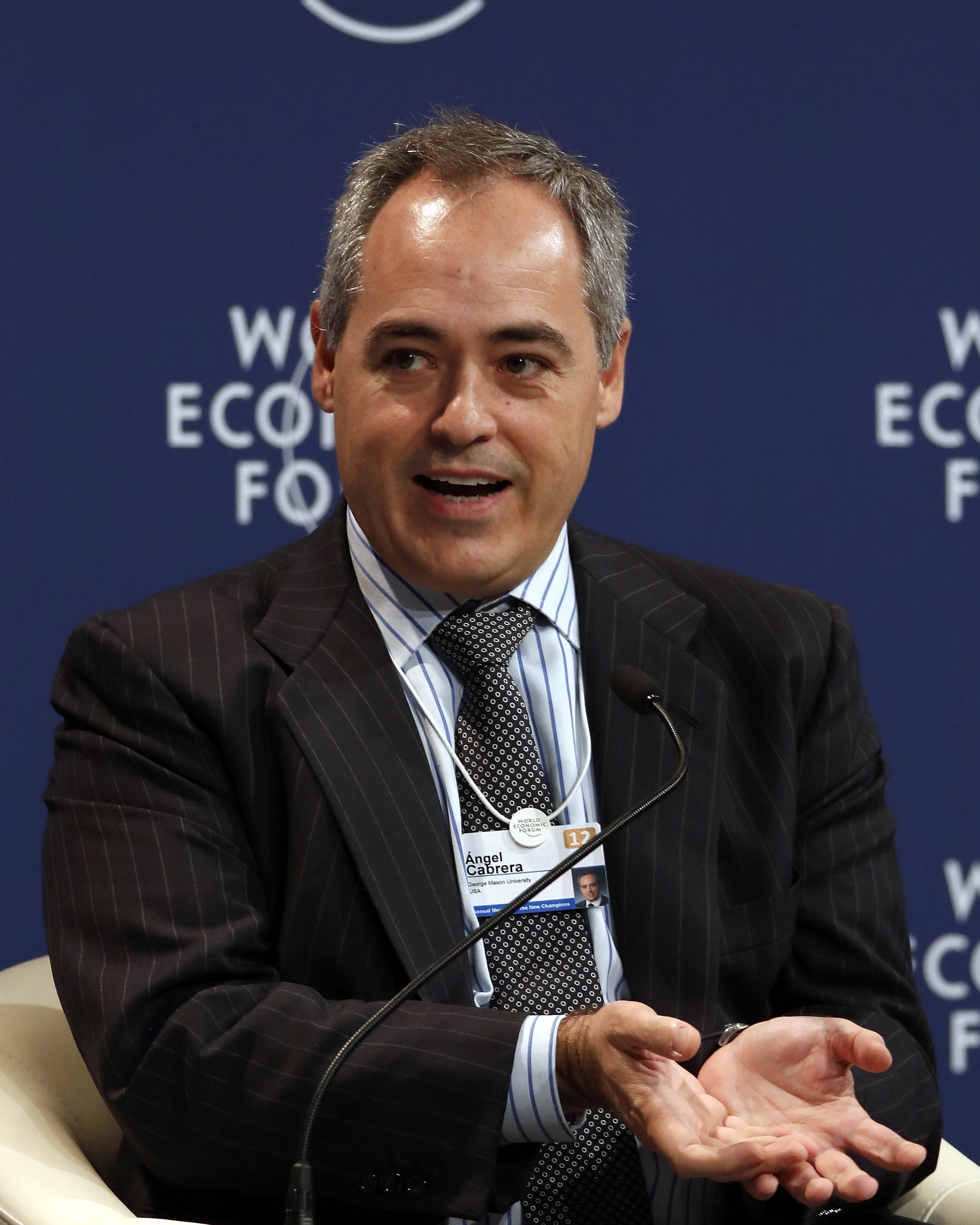
Ángel Cabrera, current president of the Georgia Institute of Technology

On September 16, 2017, Scout Schultz, a 21-year-old student at the institute, was shot dead by a Georgia Tech Police officer on campus, in what appeared to be a suicide by cop. The incident sparked a violent protest that lead to multiple arrests and a police car being torched. Following the incident, many criticized the state of mental health services at Tech, and shortly thereafter the administration announced greater investment in mental health counseling services. Following the incident, as well as the suicide of two Tech students in 2018, the University System of Georgia in 2019 announced the creation of a mental health task force to address issues at both Tech and other public universities in the state.

Peterson's presidency was marred by several major ethics scandals. In 2018, four high-ranking Georgia Tech officials were fired following serious ethical violations. One of the individuals used his position as a board-member for RIB Software to ensure no-bid contracts between the company and GTRI. The other three were found to have used their connections with companies such as Barnes & Noble and Sodexo for their own personal gain, including free access to a $35,000 Georgia Tech football suite under the pretenses of "student outreach". Another official resigned in 2019 following similar ethics violations. Investigations in 2018 also revealed the existence of a no-bid agreement between the Institute and the Coca-Cola Company that had been in place since 1993. A 2019 lawsuit filed by Sodexo against Tech alleged that the institute had withheld documents showing that some of the above-mentioned individuals had favored Aramark in awarding it a dining contract. In 2018, Tech had 85 ethics complaints, the most of any university in the University System of Georgia, and took on average approximately 102 days to investigate a complaint, the second-longest time of any USG member institution.

On January 7, 2019, Peterson announced his intent to retire from his position as president, which became effective September 1, 2019. He was succeeded that day by Ángel Cabrera, an alumnus of the institute and former president of George Mason University. Cabrera is the first Spanish-born president of an American university.

== See also ==
- Georgia Tech traditions
- History of Atlanta
- History of Georgia (U.S. state)
