= Cudd =

Cudd is a surname. Notable people with the surname include:

- Ann Cudd, American college dean and administrator
- J.W. Cudd, American singer and actor
- Nic Cudd (born 1988), Welsh rugby union footballer
- Herschel H. Cudd (1912–1992), American businessman and CEO
