= Cocking affair =

The Cocking affair was an attempt in 1941 by Georgia governor Eugene Talmadge to exert direct control over the state's educational system, particularly through the firing of Professor Walter Cocking because of his support for racial integration, and the subsequent removal of members of the Georgia Board of Regents who disagreed with the decision. It has been made into an opera entitled A Scholar Under Siege.

== Background ==
Governor Talmadge's first political interference was in 1935, when he supported a 1935 bill that would have given the governor additional control over funds appropriated to the Georgia Board of Regents, transferred the titles to all Board of Regents property to the state, and absorbed any trust funds or investments held by the university system. In addition to the obvious disadvantages for the university system, this would have made it difficult or impossible to fund building projects (such as the construction of a new gym at Georgia Tech) as the state could not take on Public Works Administration (PWA) loans.

The whole plan embodied in the bill, to make the university system a football of politics, is in my opinion disastrous to the efforts being made to build up a great university system.

— Marion Smith, chairman of the Georgia Board of Regents, 1935

A compromise deal was reached; if the bill passed with the support of the regents, the state would provide funding to cover projects that would have been supported by PWA loans; however, Talmadge's effort to control the regents and the university system was relatively clear at the time.

The event also highlighted tensions between state politics and higher education governance in Georgia.

== Firing ==
Talmadge fired Walter Cocking, who was dean of the College of Education at the University of Georgia. Talmadge accused Cocking of championing integration, in this case the admission of African-American students to historically all-white educational institutions. Talmadge declared that he would fire anyone who stood for "communism or racial equality".

== Consequences ==
As a result of the firings, all Georgia universities lost their accreditation. This incident also contributed to Talmadge's loss in the subsequent election to Ellis Arnall.

== See also ==
- History of Georgia
- History of Georgia Tech
- Georgia Southern University
- Johns Committee

== Works cited ==
- McMath, Robert C.; Ronald H. Bayor; James E. Brittain; Lawrence Foster; August W. Giebelhaus; Germaine M. Reed. Engineering the New South: Georgia Tech 1885-1985. Athens, GA: University of Georgia Press.
