= Evelyn Murray-Lenthall =

British engineer and President of the Society of Women Engineers

Evelyn E M Murray-Lenthall
- Born: 1937; Nairobi
- Died: 11 January 2025 (aged 87–88); Surrey, England
- Education: University of Southampton, Tufts and MIT

Evelyn E M Murray-Lenthall (1937 – 11 January 2025) was a Kenyan-born English engineer, who was president of the Society of Women Engineers from 1982-83. As a member of the Clan Murray of Atholl she was instrumental in many organisations in the United States which celebrate Scottish culture and heritage.

== Early life and education ==
Born Evelyn E M Murray, Murray-Lenthall was born in Nairobi, Kenya in 1937. Her father who was in the diplomatic service was the Chief Engineer of the Nigerian Broadcasting Corporation and encouraged Murray-Lenthall to become an engineer. Her early education was in Northern Rhodesia, now Zambia, later continuing her schooling in Surrey, England.

== Further education and engineering career ==
In 1957, Murray-Lenthall became a special trainee or apprentice at the Marconi Wireless Telegraph Company, whilst continuing her studies and achieving an Ordinary National Certificate in Applied Physics in 1960. She received her BSc from the University of Southampton in Physics and Mathematics, graduating in 1963.

After her work at Marconi's transmitter development department, Murray-Lenthall also worked for Technical Operations Research in Burlington, Massachusetts where she was a Research Physicist. During this time she was working on the Passive Q-switching of Ruby lasers. Murray-Lenthall spent a year at the Itek Corporation and then joined the Philco-Ford Corporation in 1966.

In 1971 Murray-Lenthall joined the Society of Women Engineers where she was an active member for many years. As well as being a Fellow of the society, Murray-Lenthall was the twentieth president of the Society of Women Engineers from 1982 to 1983 after Helen Grenga. She was succeeded by Barbara Wollmershauser.

Murray-Lenthall was a member to a number of scientific and engineering organisations including:

- Institute of Physics
- Massachusetts Engineers Council
- Women's Engineering Society
- Fellow Life Member of Society of Women Engineers

== Clan Murray of Atholl ==
Murray-Lenthall was a huge proponent of Scottish culture in the United States and an active member of Clan Murray. With her husband, Murray-Lenthall owned Atholl Brose a shop in Cambridge, Massachusetts which sold Scottish paraphernalia, including Kilts which she was skilled at making.

She also began a record label Atholl Brose which recorded, produced and published Scottish music. She collaborated with Ron Gonnella, an accomplished Scottish Fiddler, to record The New Atholl Collection in 1986. Murray-Lenthall was also a certified Royal Scottish Country Dance Society dance teacher and choreographed a number of dances to accompany The New Atholl Collection.

Murray-Lenthall was involved in a number of Scottish Heritage organisations including:

- Murray Clan Society of North America
- Member of the board of Caledonian Foundation, USA
- Founder of New Hampshire Gathering of the Scottish Clans
- Co-founder of the New Hampshire Scottish Music Club
- Founder of the North American Branch of the Murray Clan Society
- President of the Association of Scottish Games & Festivals
- Member of the Advisory Board for Fort Ticonderoga, NY

== Personal life ==
Murray-Lenthall was married to Tom Lenthall. She returned to the UK in 2019 and died in Surrey, England on 11 January 2025.

== Select works ==
- Masters, J.I. and Murray, E.M.E., 1965. Comparison of passive Q-switch components and observation of scattering effects. Proceedings of the IEEE, 53(1), pp.76-76.
- Gonnella, R. and Murray, E.M.E., 1986. The New Atholl Collection of Scottish Fiddle Music & Dances Scotpress, USA
