= William Vernon Skiles =

American mathematician

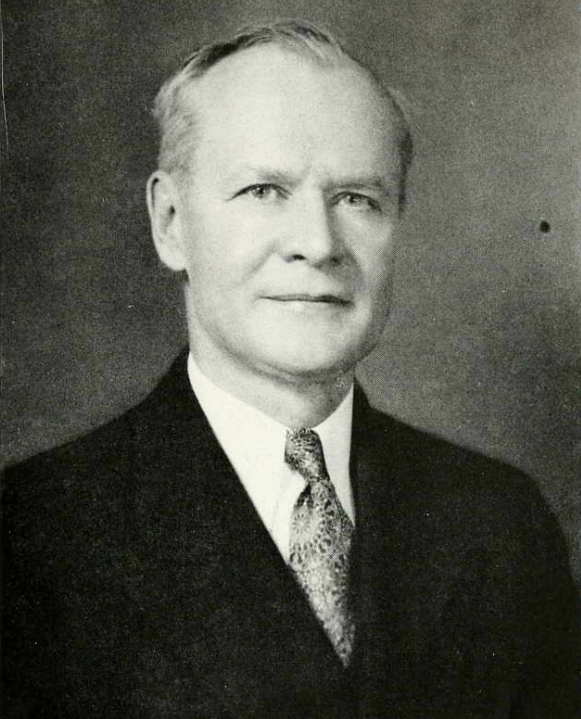
- Skiles from The 1944 Blue Print
- Born: April 23, 1879; Troy Grove, Illinois
- Died: September 10, 1947 (aged 68); Atlanta, Georgia
- Education: University of Chicago; Harvard University
- Scientific career
- Fields: Mathematics
- Workplaces: Georgia Tech

William Vernon Skiles (April 23, 1879 in Troy Grove, Illinois - September 10, 1947 in Atlanta, Georgia) was a professor of mathematics and dean at the Georgia Institute of Technology. He helped create what is now the Georgia Tech Research Institute.

== Education ==
Skiles possessed a Bachelor of Science degree from the University of Chicago, a Master of Arts degree from Harvard University and an honorary Doctor of Science degree from the University of Georgia. He was a member of Beta Theta Pi, Phi Beta Kappa, Phi Kappa Phi, and the Georgia Academy of Science.

== Georgia Tech ==
After Skiles' retirement in December 1945, the faculty were requested to donate to a fund to "give him a first class dinner and a gift." So much was donated that the remainder was put into the Dean Skiles Fund, which "provides the faculty expenses for flowers, gifts, entertainment" that could not be paid for with funds from the State of Georgia.

== Legacy ==
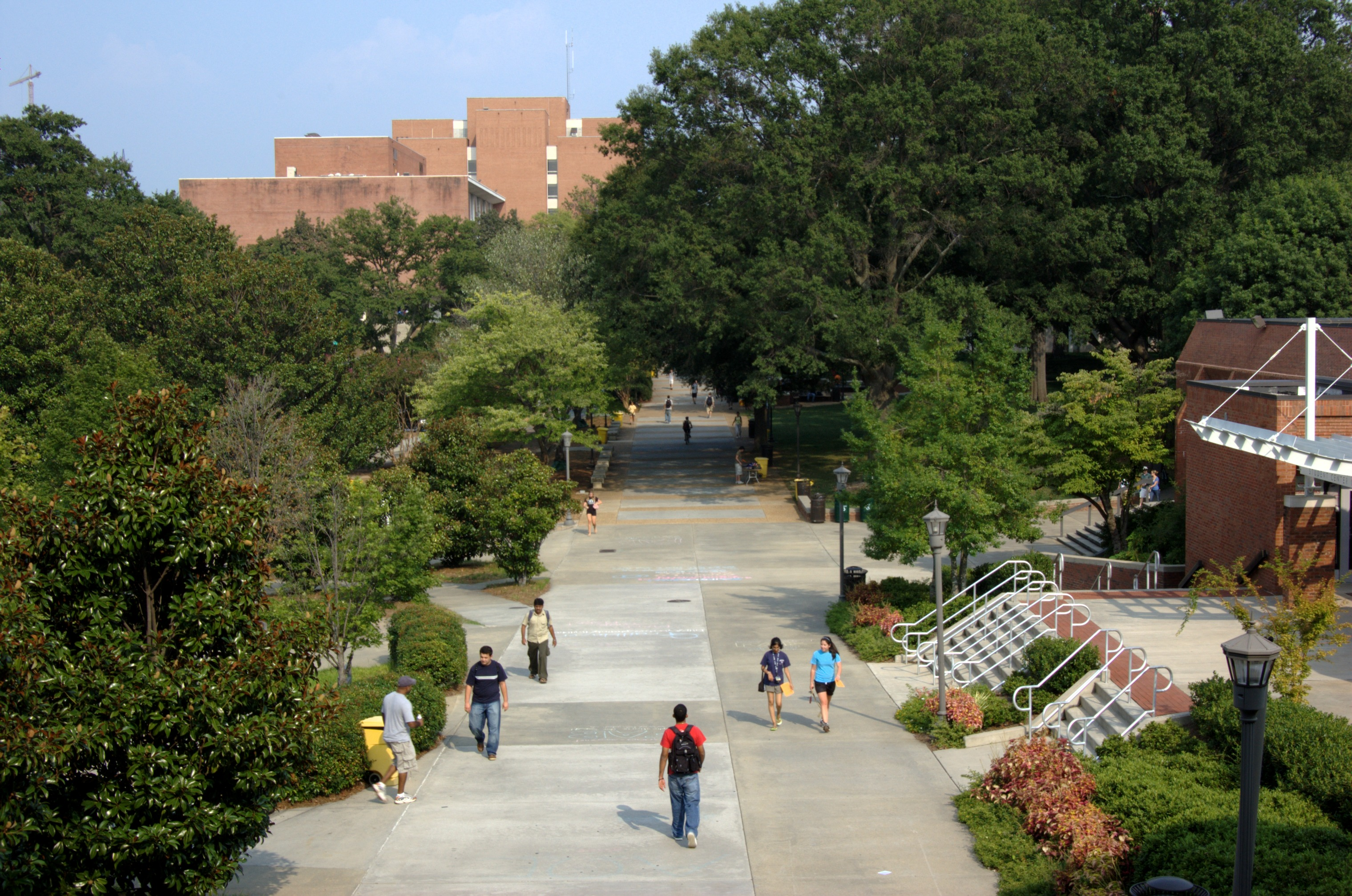
Skiles Walkway, facing east

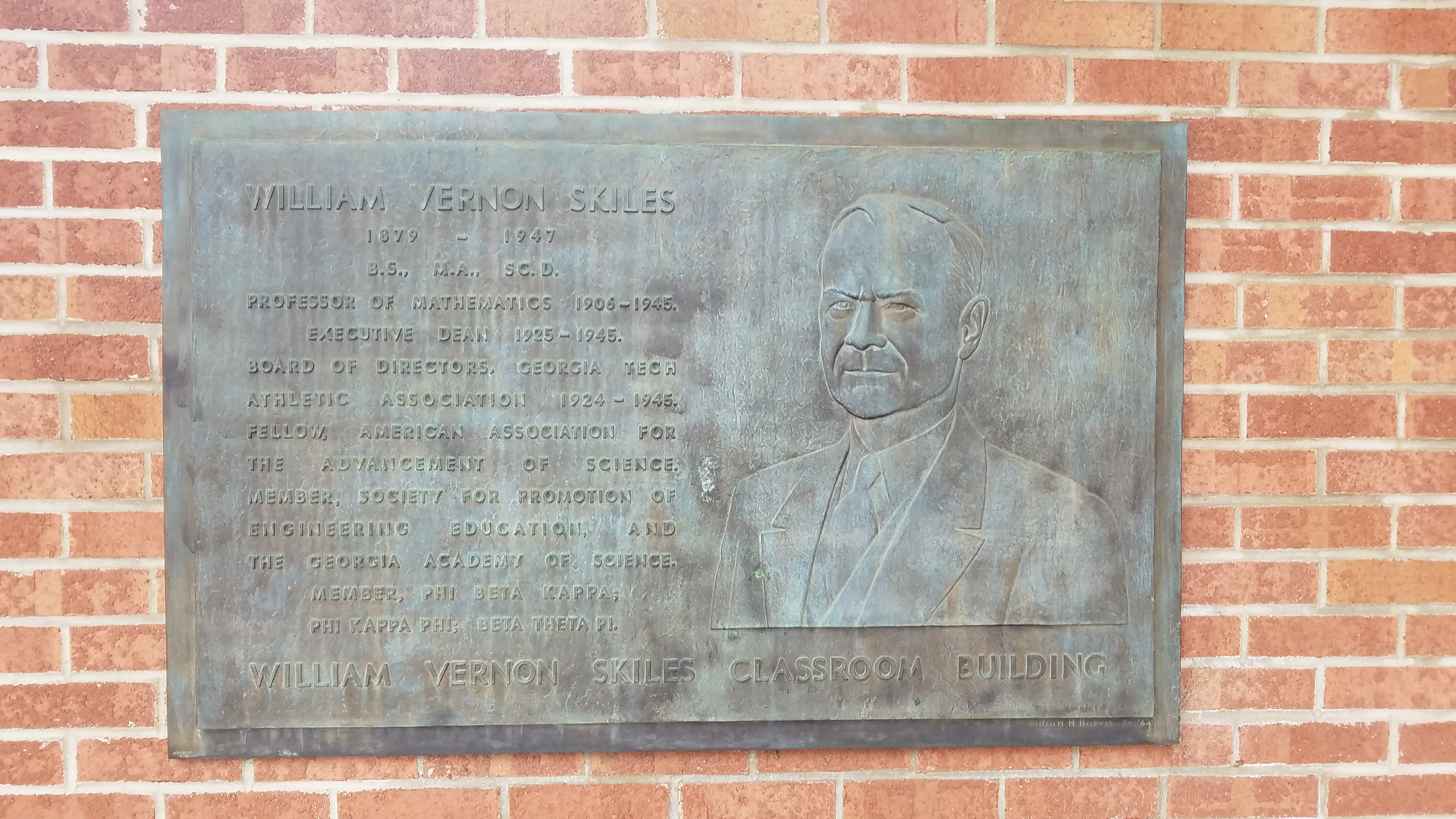
Memorial plaque in the Skiles Classroom Building

The Skiles Classroom Building has been home to the Department of Mathematics since 1958; its previous home was the second Shop Building. The nearby Skiles Walkway is the primary east–west pedestrian corridor through campus, connecting the Georgia Tech Library to the Georgia Tech Student Center.

== See also ==
- History of Georgia Tech
