= Paul Weber (academic) =

- Weber, c. 1967
- Died: 1983
- Occupation: University president

Paul Weber (February 27, 1904 – June 1983) was the interim president of the Georgia Institute of Technology from previous president Blake Ragsdale Van Leer's death until a replacement was found in Edwin D. Harrison, a period of approximately 18 months.

== Career ==
Weber initially joined Georgia Tech as a chemical engineering instructor in 1927, and over time became the head of the department. He temporarily left Georgia Tech to finish his education and in 1934 received a doctorate in chemistry from Purdue University. He was also involved in research through the Georgia Tech Research Institute, then known as the Engineering Experiment Station; his research from 1940 to 1952 focused on paint primers for Southern yellow pine.

In 1955 he was Dean of Faculties; and after an intensive reorganization of the institute administration, he was named vice president for planning in 1965.

After Georgia Tech president Blake Van Leer died in office, Weber was acting president from January 1956 to August 1957, while still holding the title of Dean of Faculties. After the selection of a replacement in 1957, he remained a Georgia Tech administrator and would be named vice president for Planning in 1966.

After his retirement in 1969, Dr. Weber was named Professor Emeritus of Chemical Engineering and Emeritus Vice President for Planning.

== See also ==
- History of Georgia Tech
