= William H. Glenn =

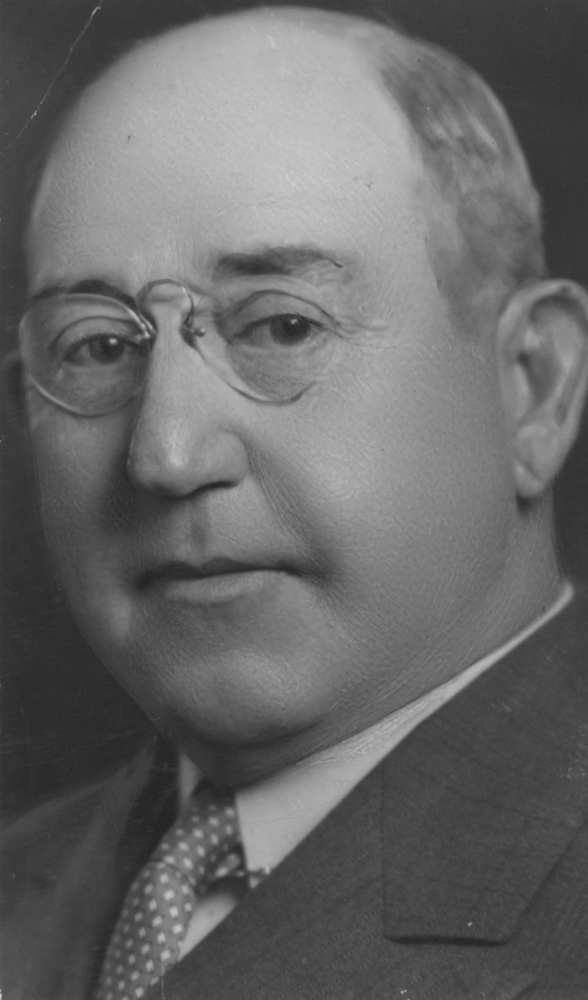
- Born: 1872; Cave Spring, Georgia
- Died: 1940 (aged 68)
- Education: Georgia Institute of Technology
- Employer(s): Atlanta Consolidated Street Railway Georgia Railway and Electric Company Southeastern Compress and Warehouse Company

William H. Glenn (1872–1940) was an 1891 graduate of the Georgia Institute of Technology and president of the Southeastern Compress and Warehouse Company.

== Early life and education ==
Glenn was born in 1872 in Cave Spring, Georgia. He was the first person to register at Georgia Tech and was a member of the school's second ever graduating class in 1891 with a B.A. in science.

== Career ==
Glenn initially worked for the Atlanta Consolidated Street Railway as an inspector, purchasing agent, and assistant superintendent. Glenn was a vice president and manager of the Georgia Railway and Electric Company, and was later president of the Southeastern Compress and Warehouse Company until 1939.

== Memberships and legacy ==
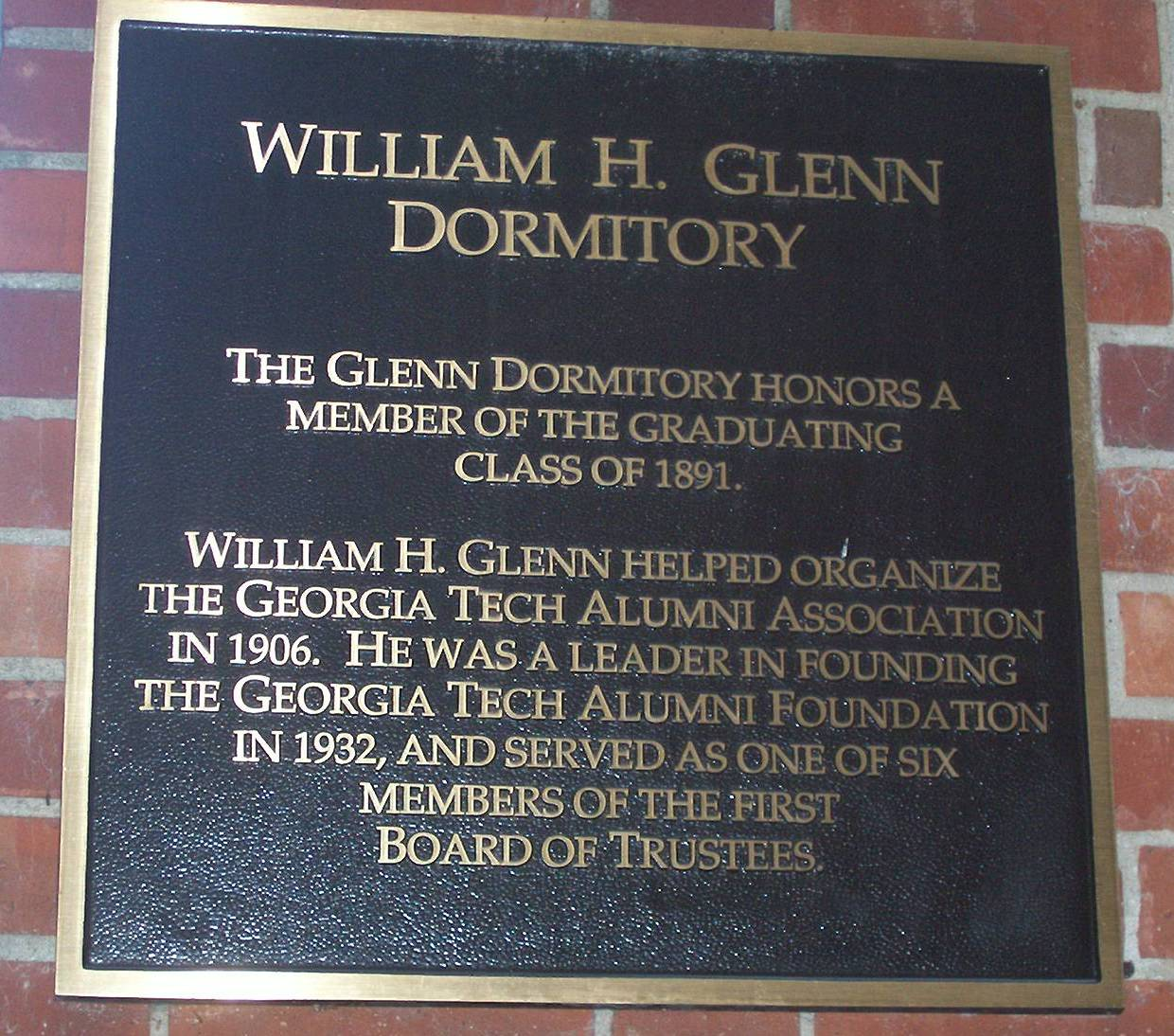
A commemorative plaque on Glenn Hall

Glenn was also a member of the Capital City Club, Atlanta Rotary Club, and the Atlanta Athletic Club. He was an honorary member of Phi Kappa Phi and the ANAK Society.

He was the first president of the Georgia Tech Alumni Association in 1921, a trustee of Georgia Tech, and was a recipient of a Georgia Tech Distinguished Service Award.

He is the namesake for Glenn Hall on the Georgia Tech campus, which was built in 1947. The William H. Glenn Fellowship Fund at the George W. Woodruff School of Mechanical Engineering is also named for him.
