= Georgia Tech Athletic Association =

Non-profit organization

The Georgia Tech Athletic Association is a non-profit organization responsible for maintaining the intercollegiate athletic program at Georgia Tech. The Athletic Association is overseen by the Georgia Tech Athletic Board. The Georgia Tech Athletic Association sponsors varsity intercollegiate athletics competition in the following sports:

Men's Intercollegiate Sports

- Football
- Baseball
- Men's Basketball
- Golf
- Tennis
- Indoor and outdoor track
- Cross country
- Swimming and Diving

Women's Intercollegiate Sports

- Basketball
- Softball
- Tennis
- Indoor and outdoor track
- Cross country
- Swimming and Diving
- Volleyball

== History ==
The Athletic Association was established in January 1901.
