= Helen E. Grenga =

Chemistry professor

Helen Eva Grenga
- Born: 1938
- Died: April 14, 2006 (aged 68)
- Occupation: Engineering professor

Helen Eva Grenga (1938 – April 14, 2006) was the first full-tenured female engineering professor at the Georgia Institute of Technology. She was one of the first tenured women chemical engineering professors in the United States.

== Early life and education ==
Grenga graduated from Shorter College in 1960 with a B.A. in Chemistry, and from the University of Virginia in 1967 with a Ph.D. in Physical Chemistry.

She worked for the Food and Drug Administration for a few years before returning to academia.

== Georgia Tech ==
Grenga first arrived at Georgia Tech in 1967, working as a postdoctoral fellow in chemistry. In 1968, she held the title of professor of metallurgy.

Other roles Grenga held included Director of the Office of Graduate Studies and Research, and Dean of the Office of Academic Affairs. Her achievements and presence as a senior woman in the field were inspiring for the next generation of female engineering students.

== Awards ==
Grenga received a number of awards, including the Georgia Tech ANAK Faculty Award and the Georgia Tech Women’s Leadership Conference’s Women of Distinction Outstanding Faculty Member Award.

From 1981 to 1982, she was national president of the Society of Women Engineers (SWE), having joined the organisation in 1973. Her presidency was preceded by Sharon Loeffler and followed by Evelyn Murray-Lenthall. She was a regular attendee of the SWE annual National Conference. She worked to support other women into STEM fields, and supported the local SWE branch at Georgia Tech.

In 2001, Grenga published Movies on the Fantail, ISBN 0-9709110-0-9, about her brother's time on the USS Barr during World War II.

Helen Grenga died on 14 April 2006 aged 68.

== Legacies ==
Helen Grenga Outstanding Woman Engineer Award

== Publications ==
- Active sites for the catalytic decomposition of carbon monoxide on nickel (1967)
- Structure and Topography of Monocrystalline Nickel Thin Films Grown by Vapor Deposition (1971)
- Active Sites for Heterogeneous Catalysis (1972)
- Field-ion microscopy of ferrous martensite (1972)
- Chemisorption and catalysis: carbon monoxide on metals and alloys (1972)
- Adsorption of carbon monoxide on ruthenium (1973)
- Field-ion microscope investigations of fine structures in as-quenched and tempered ferrous martensite (1973)
- Field-ion microscopy of tempered martensite (1974)
- Auger analysis of surface films on Ag3Sn. (1975)
- Surface energy anisotropy of iridium (1975)
- Twenty-second International Field Emission Symposium (1975)
- Surface energy anisotropy of tungsten (1976)
- Surface energy anisotropy of iron (1976)
- Chemisorption and analysis : carbon monoxide on metals and alloys (1980)
- Cooperative education comprehensive demonstration program for post secondary students (1987)
