= Georgia Tech Alumni Association =

Alumni association in Georgia, USA

- Type: Alumni association
- Established: June 20, 1908; 118 years ago
- Affiliations: Georgia Institute of Technology
- President: Dene Sheheane
- Location: Atlanta, Georgia, USA
- Colors: White and Gold
- Website: gtalumni.org

The Georgia Tech Alumni Association is the official alumni association for the Georgia Institute of Technology (Georgia Tech). Originally known as the Georgia Tech National Alumni Association, it was chartered in June 1908 and incorporated in 1947. Its offices have been in the L. W. "Chip" Robert, Jr. Alumni House on North Avenue since 1979.

Its first presidents (starting in 1921) were William H. Glenn, followed by L. W. Robert, Jr. and Y. Frank Freeman. The current president of the alumni association is Dene Sheheane. Sheheane succeeds Joseph Irwin who previously held the position since 1999. Other notable presidents include Cherry L. Emerson, Bobby Jones, and Frank A. Hooper.

As of September 2019, there were approximately 166,000 living alumni of Georgia Tech. Since 2006, Georgia Tech alumni have given between $30 million to $40 million a year, providing about 30 to 40 percent of the institute's development funds. Georgia Tech is ranked third in alumni giving among public universities, and 26th overall.

== History ==
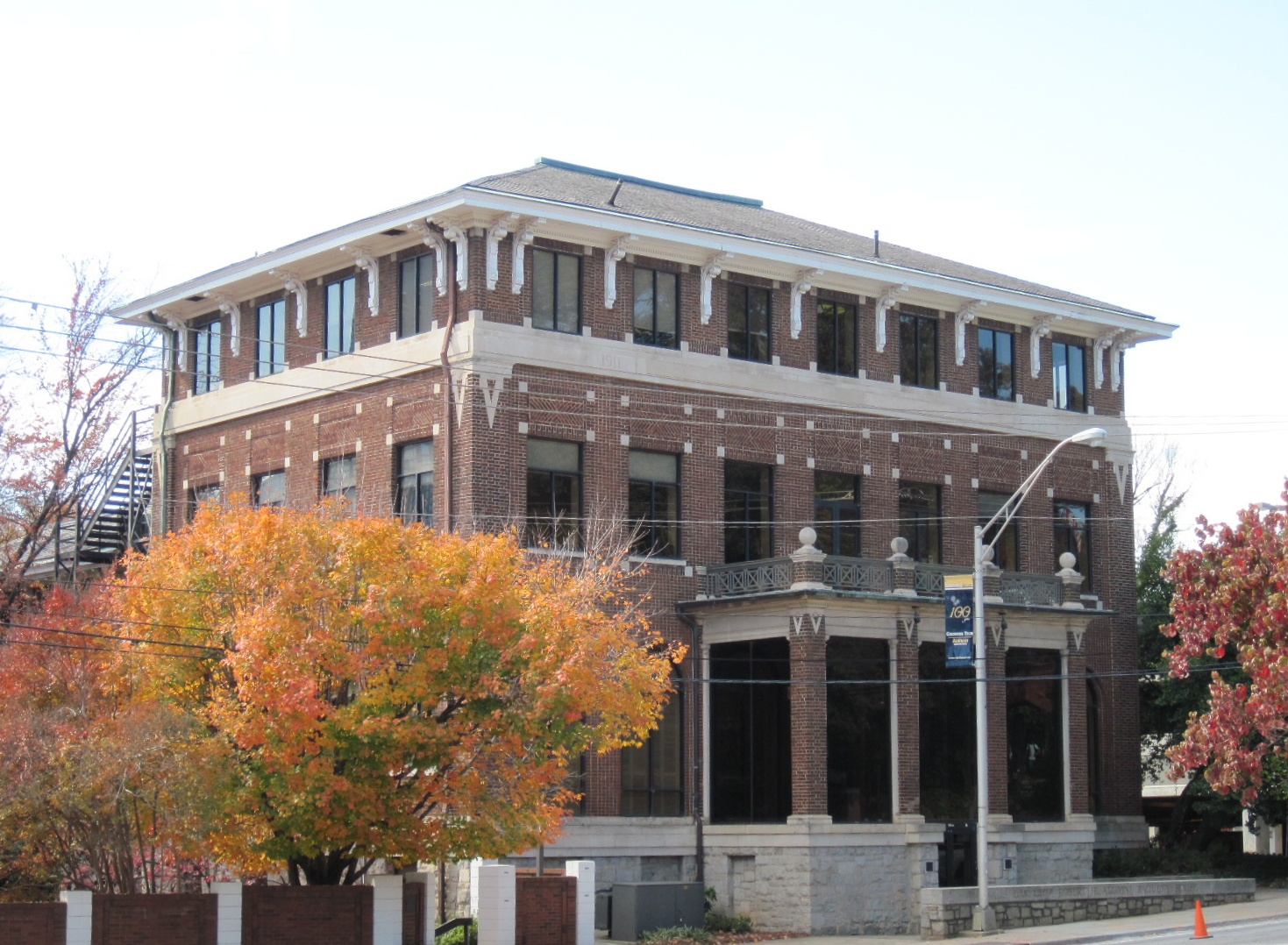
The L. W. "Chip" Robert, Jr. Alumni House, the office for the Georgia Tech Alumni Association since 1979.

Georgia Tech was founded in 1885 and opened in 1888, and the first two graduates matriculated in 1890. Attempts at forming an alumni association had been made since 1896, until a charter was applied for by J. B. McCrary and William H. Glenn on June 28, 1906, and was approved two years later by Fulton County on June 20, 1908. The organization published its first annual report in 1908, but was largely dormant due to the pressures of World War I. The organization played an important role in the 1920s Greater Georgia Tech Campaign, which consolidated all existing alumni clubs and funded a significant expansion of Georgia Tech's campus.

In 1923, the alumni association created one of its most popular programs, an alumni placement service. In 1932, the service was reorganized and run by Dean George C. Griffin and Fred W. Ajax until budget cuts returned forced the program's return to the alumni association in 1949. The alumni association's placement service is now known as "JacketNet Jobs".

In 1947, prompted by the Georgia Board of Regents' critical lack of funding for the school, the association organized the annual Alumni Roll Call, which asked graduates to donate according to their ability; the fundraiser continues to this day. The association won numerous awards for the performance of the Roll Call from the American Alumni Council; this included the organization's highest award, the Alumni Service Award, in 1967 for the development and operation of the Joint Tech-Georgia Development Fund.

Also in 1947, the association polled all existing alumni on whether the school should change its name from the Georgia School of Technology to the Georgia Institute of Technology; the alumni voted 5,113 to 1,495 in favor of the change, a result that Georgia Tech president Blake R. Van Leer took to the Georgia Board of Regents to convince them to allow the name change. The alumni association (and association president Fred Storey in particular) was influential in the finding and selection of Georgia Tech president Edwin D. Harrison in 1957.

== Publications ==
The Fall 2002 cover of the Georgia Tech Alumni Magazine

The alumni association produces a monthly magazine that chronicles the accomplishments of Georgia Tech, its faculty and its alumni. Initially founded in 1923 as the Georgia Tech Alumnus under editor Albert H. Staton, who left to work in industry; his place was taken by R. J. Thiesen who was editor of the magazine until 1951. In 1969, the publication had a circulation of 20,000. The publication is now the Georgia Tech Alumni Magazine. A companion publication to the Alumni Association Magazine was established in 1965 as a quarterly newsletter and named Tech Topics. This publication won national Newsletter of the Year in 1967.

The organization is the sole subject of a published book, Ramblin' Wrecks from Georgia Tech: A Centennial History of the Georgia Tech Alumni Association.

== See also ==
- List of Georgia Institute of Technology alumni
- List of Georgia Institute of Technology athletes
