= Walter Cocking =

Walter D. Cocking (1891 – January 14, 1964) was an academic administrator. As Dean of the College Education of the University of Georgia, he was fired in 1941, rehired, and fired again for supporting racial integration. The episode is known as the Cocking affair.

== Early life and education ==
Cocking was born in Manchester, Iowa and earned a bachelor's degree from Des Moines College, a Master's from Iowa, and his doctorate from Columbia He worked as a superintendent of schools in Iowa and was an artillery lieutenant in World War I.

== Early career ==
Cocking initially held academic administrative positions in Iowa, Texas, and Missouri. He then spent five years as professor of school administration at the George Peabody College for Teachers in Nashville, Tennessee. From 1932 to 1936, he was the commissioner of education for Tennessee.

== University of Georgia ==
In 1937, Cocking was hired to improve academic standards at the University of Georgia's College of Education. While there he developed several reforms but had a "brash and domineering style". In 1941, Georgia governor Eugene Talmadge insisted to the Georgia Board of Regents that Cocking be fired, sparking the Cocking affair. After initially not rehiring Cocking in an 8-4 vote, University of Georgia president Harmon Caldwell threatened to resign unless Cocking's case was reheard. After hearing evidence, the Georgia Board of Regents rehired Cocking in an 8-7 vote; this decision infuriated Talmadge, who proceeded to fire and replace any on the Board of Regents who opposed the governor. At the following Board of Regents meeting, Cocking was again fired, in a 10-5 vote.
