= Herschel H. Cudd =

American university director

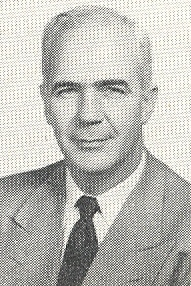
- Born: July 29, 1912; New York City, New York, United States
- Died: March 9, 1992 (aged 79); Juno Beach, Florida, United States
- Education: Texas A&I University; University of Texas
- Known for: Contributions to physical chemistry, leader of several organizations
- Scientific career
- Workplaces: E. I. du Pont de Nemours & Company, Inc International Minerals and Chemical Corporation; West Point Manufacturing Company; Georgia Tech Research Institute; American Viscose Corporation; AviSun Corporation; Amoco Chemical Corporation R. J. Reynolds Tobacco Company

Herschel Herbert Cudd (July 29, 1912 – March 9, 1992) was the director of the Georgia Institute of Technology's Engineering Experiment Station (now known as the Georgia Tech Research Institute) from 1952 to 1954, succeeding Gerald Rosselot in that position. He would later become the president of Amoco Chemical Company and serve on the board of the R. J. Reynolds Tobacco Company.

Cudd was initially a part-time instructor of chemistry and a state liquor board chemist. Cudd quickly attained jobs as a research chemist at E. I. du Pont de Nemours & Company, Inc, the International Minerals and Chemical Corporation, and then the West Point Manufacturing Company, focusing on inorganic chemistry, the development of synthetic materials, and the head of a textile engineering plant.

From there, he was the director of the Georgia Tech Research Institute, where he created a solution to a long-standing debate about the role of research engineers in a tenure system and significantly increased the number of researchers. He would then lead or hold a leadership role in several oil companies, including American Viscose Corporation, AviSun Corporation, Sun Oil Company, and finally Amoco Chemical Corporation; Cudd would be president of the latter from 1963 to 1974. From 1976 until his retirement in 1983, Cudd served on the board of directors for R. J. Reynolds Tobacco Company.

== Education and early career ==
Cudd graduated from Texas A&I University in 1933 with a degree in chemistry. He then studied physical chemistry at the University of Texas at Austin and received a Master of Arts in 1936 and a Doctor of Philosophy in 1941.

From 1934 to 1937 and from 1939 to 1940, Cudd was a part-time instructor of chemistry at the University of Texas. From 1937 to 1939 and 1940 to 1941, he was a Texas Liquor Control Board chemist.

From 1941 to 1942, he was a research chemist at the Rayon Technical Division of the E. I. du Pont de Nemours & Company, Inc. At du Pont, Cudd worked on pilot-plant development of experimental polymers such as synthetic fibers and plastics. In 1942, he took a job as Supervisor of Inorganic Research for the International Minerals and Chemical Corporation in East Point, Georgia, now known as The Mosaic Company. While there, he oversaw work on silica gel, phosphates, magnesium and powder metallurgy.

In 1946, he became a research chemist for the West Point Manufacturing Company in Shawmut, Alabama (now known as WestPoint Home); in 1949, he became director of West Point Manufacturing's new Lantuck Division in West Point, Georgia. While there he studied the use of synthetic resins in textile engineering, which led to West Point Manufacturing's fabric, "Lantuck". Cudd was in charge of production and sales of the fabric until he came to Georgia Tech.

== Georgia Tech ==
In March 1950, Cudd was appointed head of the Engineering Experiment Station's Chemical Sciences division. After Gerald Rosselot left to work for Bendix Corporation, Cudd assumed the acting directorship on November 24, 1952, and was appointed as the station's director on July 1, 1953; he would hold this position until November 30, 1953. Despite his post only lasting approximately a year, Cudd made far-reaching changes to the station.

Comparison of ranks at Georgia Tech
Academic	Research
Professor	Senior research scientist or engineer
Assistant professor	Research scientist or engineer
Associate professor	Junior research scientist or engineer
Instructor	Research assistant

One of the first issues Cudd addressed was station financing; a related dispute between previous director Rosselot and Georgia Tech vice president Cherry Emerson had resulted in Rosselot's departure. Thus a deal was brokered that explicitly stated that the station's contract organization (now the Georgia Tech Research Corporation) would receive 10/46 of overhead, Georgia Tech would receive 13/46, and 23/46 would go directly to the station to cover administrative costs.

Under Rosselot, research had been increasingly concentrated on a few researchers; Cudd reversed this trend such that the 1952–53 Annual Report of Engineering Experiment Station (EES) stated that 66 faculty in 15 schools performed research at the station that year.

Cudd also created a new promotion system for researchers that is still in use to this day. Many EES researchers held the rank of professor despite lacking a doctorate (or a comparable qualification for promotion as determined by the Georgia Board of Regents), something that irritated members of the teaching faculty. The new system, approved in the spring 1953, used the board of regents' qualifications for promotion and mirrored the academic tenure track. As part of the new system, research engineers were defined as "adjunct members" of the General Faculty but were excluded from the Faculty Senate, which makes academic decisions.

In 1954, a faculty committee appointed to do a comprehensive study of Georgia Tech, "The Aims and Objectives of the Georgia Institute of Technology", noted that of EES's budget of $2 million for 1953–1954, about 83 percent was sponsored by governmental agencies, and about two thirds of that was classified. The committee members felt that percentage to be undesirable, and also noted the lack of collaboration between the EES and academic departments.

== Oil and cigarettes ==
On November 30, 1953, Cudd resigned as director of the EES to become vice president and manager of research and development of the American Viscose Corporation, which has since been acquired by FMC Corporation. In 1960, Cudd became the head of the polypropylene manufacturer AviSun Corporation, which was jointly owned by the American Viscose Corporation and Sun Oil Company.

From 1963 to 1974, Cudd was the President of Amoco Chemical Corporation (also known as Standard Oil of Indiana), a subsidiary of Standard Oil; during this time, he was also director of Standard Oil. In 1968, Amoco acquired Cudd's previous company, AviSun Corporation. From 1976 to 1983, Cudd served on the board of directors for R. J. Reynolds Tobacco Company. He was senior vice president of the board when he retired in 1982.

He died on March 9, 1992, at age 79 in Juno Beach, Florida.

== Works cited ==
- McMath, Robert C.; Ronald H. Bayor; James E. Brittain; Lawrence Foster; August W. Giebelhaus; Germaine M. Reed (1985). Engineering the New South: Georgia Tech 1885–1985. Athens, GA: University of Georgia Press. ISBN 0-8203-0784-X.
