= Bob McMath =

American historian & academic (b.1944)

Robert C. (Bob) McMath Jr.
- Born: 1944 (age 81–82)
- Education: University of North Carolina at Chapel Hill
- Scientific career
- Workplaces: Georgia Institute of Technology; University of Arkansas

Robert C. "Bob" McMath Jr. (born 1944) is a historian and former Dean of the Honors College of the University of Arkansas. He received his PhD from the University of North Carolina at Chapel Hill in 1972. From then until his appointment at the University of Arkansas in 2005, he taught history and held a series of administrative posts at Georgia Tech, except for 1996 when he was a Fulbright Lecturer in Italy. In August 2014, he retired from the University of Arkansas and is now Professor Emeritus of History and Dean Emeritus.

== Education ==
McMath is a 1967 graduate of the University of North Texas. He received his PhD from the University of North Carolina at Chapel Hill in 1972.

== Career ==
=== Georgia Tech ===
As Vice Provost at Georgia Tech, McMath oversaw student academic services and coordinated campus-wide initiatives to improve the teaching and learning environment for undergraduates, including the design and partial funding of the Clough Undergraduate Learning Commons. As professor of history he taught a wide range of undergraduate courses and supervised graduate students. He received the George C. Griffin Award for Outstanding Teaching and the Dean James E. Dull Administrator of the Year Award, and in 2004 was named an honorary alumnus.

In 1994, he received the (Georgia) Governor's Award for the Humanities. While at Georgia Tech, McMath served as faculty advisor for the ANAK Society, a secretive honor society of senior students.

=== Arkansas ===
McMath's responsibilities as dean of the Honors College included general oversight of operations in the College, development of new Honors initiatives (in collaboration with the faculty), coordination of activities among college-level Honors Programs, donor stewardship and cultivation, and communication with internal and external audiences about the Honors College. He also supervised graduate and undergraduate student research and teach Honors courses and colloquia in History. In his role as dean, McMath held an endowed chair funded through a gift from the Walton Family.

== Bibliography and selected publications ==
McMath is the author or co-author of numerous articles and seven books on American history:

- American Populism: A Social History 1877-1898
- Class, Conflict, and Consensus: Antebellum Southern Community Studies (with Orville V. Burton)
- Populist Vanguard: A History of the Southern Farmers' Alliance
- Engineering the New South: Georgia Tech, 1885-1985 (see History of Georgia Tech)
- Adaptable South: Essays in Honor of George Brown Tindall (with Elizabeth Jacoway, Dan T. Carter & Lester C. Lamon)
- Toward a New South: Studies in Post-Civil War Southern Communities (with Orville Burton)
- Is There a Southern Political Tradition?: Essays and Commentaries (Porter M. Fortune Chancellor's Symposium in Southern History)(with William J. Cooper, Michael Perman, Manning Marable, and Patricia Sullivan)
- Preface to Populism: The origin and economic development of the "Southern" Farmers' Alliance in Kansas
- William Henry Emerson and the scientific discipline at Georgia Tech
