= Ramblin' Wreck from Georgia Tech =

Fight song of Georgia Institute of Technology

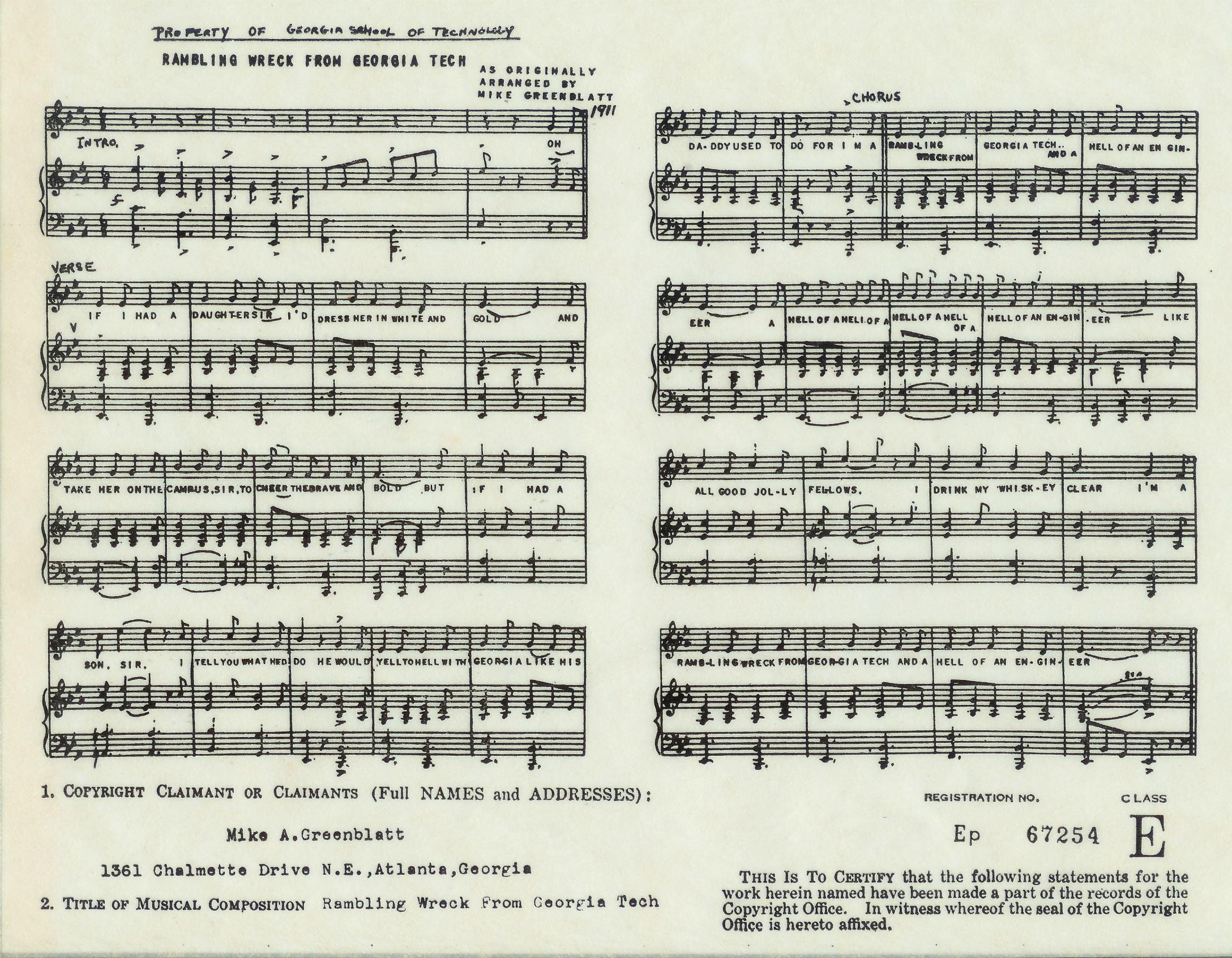
- Mike Greenblatt's 1911 arrangement

Song by Georgia Tech students
- Published: 1908, 1919 (copyrighted)
- Genre: Fight song
- Composers: Frank Roman, Michael A. Greenblatt, Charles Ives
- Lyricist: Billy Walthall

"(I'm a) Ramblin' Wreck from Georgia Tech" is the fight song of the Georgia Institute of Technology, better known as Georgia Tech. The composition is based on "Son of a Gambolier", composed by Charles Ives in 1895, the lyrics of which are based on an old English and Scottish drinking song of the same name. It first appeared in print in the 1908 Blueprint, Georgia Tech's yearbook. The song was later sung by the Georgia Tech Glee Club on The Ed Sullivan Show in 1953, and by Richard Nixon and Nikita Khrushchev during the 1959 Kitchen Debate.

"Ramblin' Wreck" is played after every Georgia Tech score in a football game, directly after a field goal or safety, and preceded by "Up With the White and Gold" after a touchdown. It is also frequently played during timeouts at the team's basketball games.

The term "Ramblin' Wreck" has been used to refer to students and alumni of Georgia Tech much longer than the Model A now known as the Ramblin' Wreck has been in existence. The expression has its origins in the late 19th century and was used originally to refer to the makeshift motorized vehicles constructed by Georgia Tech engineers employed in projects in the jungles of South America. Other workers in the area began to refer to these vehicles and the men who drove them as "Rambling Wrecks from Georgia Tech."

== Lyrics ==
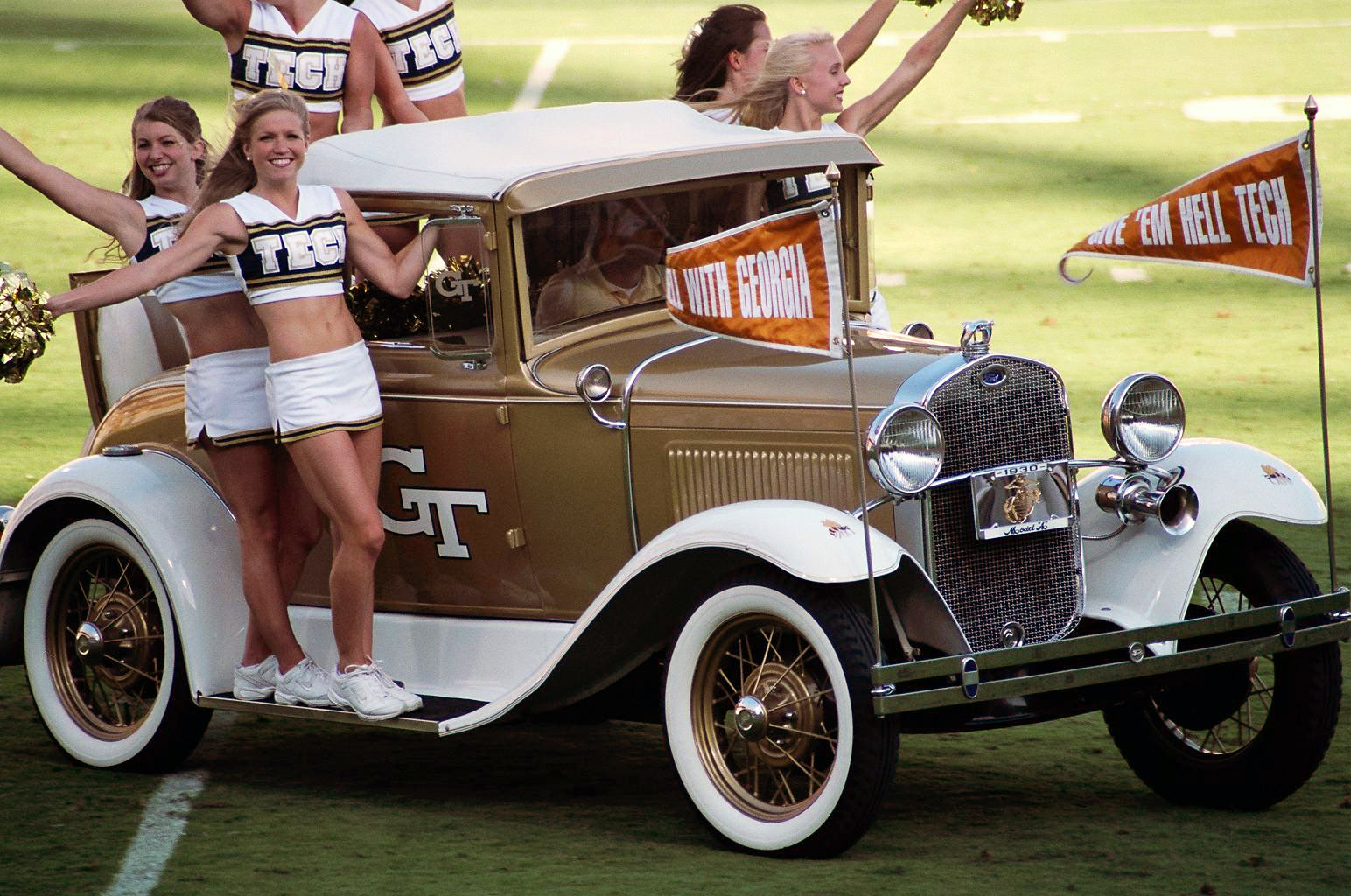
A nickname for students at Georgia Tech is "Ramblin' Wreck," after the vehicle and school mascot shown here.

Ramblin' Wreck from Georgia Tech
A soundie based on "Ramblin' Wreck." Note the substitution of "heck" for "hell."

I'm a Ramblin' Wreck from Georgia Tech, and a hell of an engineer—
A helluva, helluva, helluva, helluva, hell of an engineer.
Like all the jolly good fellows, I drink my whiskey clear.
I'm a Ramblin' Wreck from Georgia Tech and a hell of an engineer.

Oh! If I had a daughter, sir, I'd dress her in White and Gold,
And put her on the campus to cheer the brave and bold.
But if I had a son, sir, I'll tell you what he'd do—
He would yell, 'To hell with Georgia!' like his daddy used to do.

Oh, I wish I had a barrel of rum and sugar three thousand pounds,
A college bell to put it in and a clapper to stir it round.
I'd drink to all the good fellows who come from far and near.
I'm a ramblin', gamblin', hell of an engineer!

== Previous adaptations ==
The earliest rendition of the song is "Son of a Gambolier" (also known as "A Son of a Gambolier" and "The Son of a Gambolier"), which is a lament to one's own poverty; a gambolier is "a worthless individual given to carousing, gambling, and general moral depravity." The chorus goes:

Like every jolly fellow
I takes my whiskey clear,
For I'm a rambling rake of poverty
And the son of a gambolier.

The tune was first adapted as a school song by Dickinson College in southern Pennsylvania in the 1850s. Students at the college modified it to include a reference to their college bell by adding the following lyrics:

I wish I had a barrel of rum,
And sugar three hundred pounds,
The college bell to mix it in,
The clapper to stir it round

In 1857, the Delta Kappa Epsilon fraternity published a songbook that contained a heavily modified version of the song. The adapted chorus used the following lyrics:

I'm a son of a, son of a, son of a, son of a, son of a DKE!
I'm a son of a, son of a, son of a, son of a, son of a DKE!
Like every college fellow, I like my whiskey free,
For I'm a rambling rake of a college man,
And the son of a DKE!

The song was subsequently adapted by the Colorado School of Mines in the late 1870s and entitled "The Mining Engineer." This version is the closest adaptation to "Ramblin' Wreck from Georgia Tech."

Like every honest fellow,
I take my whisky clear,
I'm a rambling wreck from Golden Tech,
a helluva engineer.

The Mines version also once included:

Oh, if I had a daughter
I'd dress her up in green,
And send her up to Boulder
To coach the football team
But if I had a son, sir,
I'll tell you what he'd do—
He'd yell: 'TO HELL WITH BOULDER!'
Like his daddy used to do.

The song is also used by the South Dakota School of Mines and Technology, entitled "Ramblin' Wreck" although on campus it is referred to simply as the "School Song." This version is almost identical to the first four lines of "Ramblin' Wreck from Georgia Tech."

I'm a rambling wreck from Rapid Tech, and a helluva engineer.
a helluva, helluva, helluva, helluva, hell of an engineer.
Like all my jolly good fellows, I drink my whiskey clear,
I'm a rambling wreck from Rapid Tech, and a helluva engineer. Hey!

In the early 1890s, Ohio State University adapted it and called it "If I had a Daughter". At the time Ohio Wesleyan University was their archrival, hence the references to Delaware, Ohio and Methodists. One verse follows:

If I had a daughter, I'd dress her up in green,
I'd send her on the campus to coach the Freshman team;
And if I had a son, I tell you what he'd do
He would yell "To Hell" with Delaware"
And yell for O. S. U.

In 1895, Rensselaer Polytechnic Institute adapted it and called it "A Son of Old R.P.I." This version includes the lyrics:

Like every honest fellow,
I drink my whiskey clear,
I'm a moral wreck from the Polytech
And a hell of an engineer.

The Clemson University Tiger Band's rude songbook, "The Unhymnal", has a four-verse parody of the fight song that is distinctly unfiltered which derides the Georgia Tech coach, football team and cheerleaders.

Here is the unofficial 4th verse to the song from the 1970s & 1980s:

I'm a twiddly-twat from Agnes Scott, and I dated a guy from Tech,
He took me to The Varsity, and taught me how to neck;
He fed me all those V-Dogs, and pitchers & pitchers of beer,
And now I'm the mother of a nine-pound Engineer!

In 1929 Norwegian University of Science and Technology adapted it and called it "Nu klinger".

Studenter i den gamle stad, ta vare på byens ry!
Husk på at jenter, øl og dram var kjempenes meny.
Og faller I alle mann alle, skal det gjalle fra alle mot sky.
La'kke byen få ro, men la den få merke det er en studenterby!
Og øl og dram, og øl og dram, og øl og dram, og øl og dram.

Two different sources are claimed to have been the origin for the song's music. The first is the marching tune "The Bonnie Blue Flag", published in 1861 by Harry McCarthy. The second, and more widely cited, is Charles Ives' composition of "Son of a Gambolier" in 1895.

== Creation at Georgia Tech ==
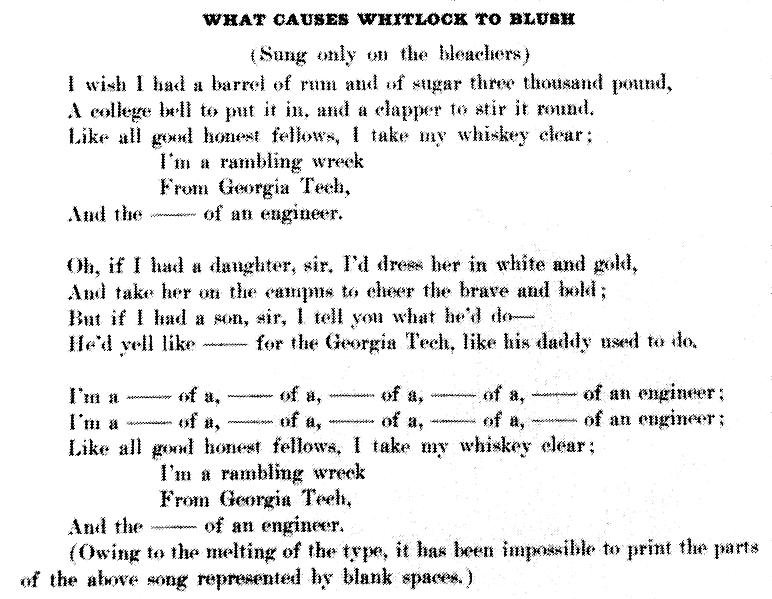
The first publication of "Ramblin' Wreck" was in the 1908 Blue Print, entitled "What Causes Whitlock to Blush". The words "hell" and "helluva" were too hot to print: at the bottom, it explains that "Owing to the melting of the type, it has been impossible to print the parts of the above song represented by blank spaces".

Georgia Tech's use of the song is said to have come from an early baseball game against rival Georgia. Some sources credit Billy Walthall, a member of the school's first four-year graduating class, with the lyrics. According to a 1954 article in Sports Illustrated, "Ramblin' Wreck" was written around 1893 by a Tech football player on his way to an Auburn game.

The "Rambling Wreck" had its beginning during the first year or two after Tech opened. Some of the frills were afterward added. We had no football team during the early days, but football was played on the campus. A round rubber ball was used and it was strictly football-no holding the ball and running with it. We had a good baseball team and I remember on one occasion almost the whole school went over to Athens to play Georgia. Duke Black of Rome pitched and we brought home the bacon. This was the beginning of the Rambling Wreck.

— H. D. Cutter, ME 1892

In 1905, Georgia Tech adopted the tune as its official fight song, though it had already been the unofficial fight song for several years. It was published for the first time in the school's first yearbook, the 1908 Blueprint. Entitled "What causes Whitlock to Blush", words such as "hell" and "helluva" were censored as "certain words [are] too hot to print".

After Michael A. Greenblatt, Tech's first bandmaster, heard the Georgia Tech band playing the song to the tune of Charles Ives's "A Son of a Gambolier", he wrote a modern musical version. In 1911, Frank Roman succeeded Greenblatt as bandmaster; Roman embellished the song with trumpet flourishes and publicized it. Roman copyrighted the song in 1919.

== Rise to fame ==
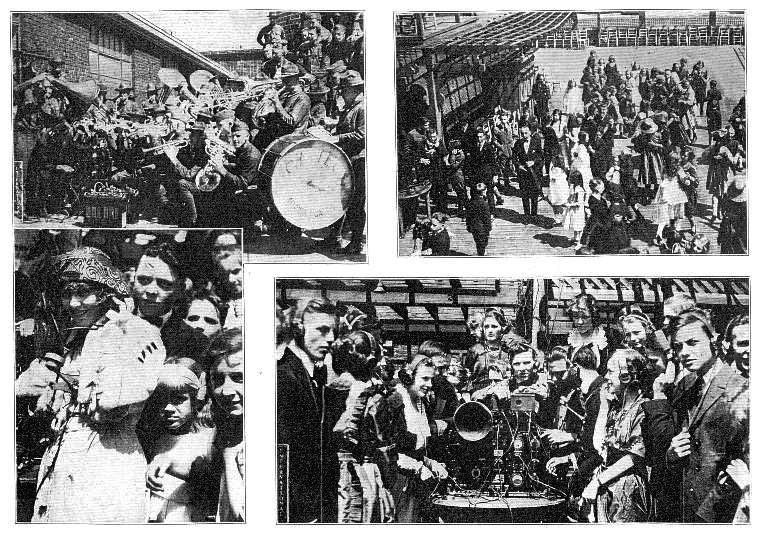
Arthur Murray's 1920 Radio Dance, as portrayed in the 1920 Blueprint; "Ramblin' Wreck" was one of the songs played that night.

In 1920, dance instructor Arthur Murray organized the world's first "radio dance" while he attended Tech. A band on campus played "Ramblin' Wreck" and other songs, which were broadcast to a group of about 150 dancers (mostly Tech students) on the roof of the Capital City Club in downtown Atlanta. Murray also opened the first Arthur Murray Dance Studio while in Atlanta. It was located at the Georgian Terrace Hotel. In 1925, the Columbia Gramophone Company began selling a recording of Tech songs (including "Ramblin' Wreck"); Tech was one of the first colleges in the Southern United States to have its songs recorded. The song became immensely popular and was known nationally because of its extensive radio play. In 1947, the song was performed by The Gordonaires in a Soundie entitled "Let's Sing A College Song".

On October 11, 1953, the Georgia Tech Glee Club sang "Ramblin' Wreck" on Ed Sullivan's "Toast of the Town" program (later known as The Ed Sullivan Show) on CBS. The performance reached a television audience of approximately 30 million viewers. Because only 28 seats were available on the train to the show, Glee Club members auditioned for the available spots. The group prepared three songs—"Ramblin' Wreck," There's Nothin' Like a Dame, and the alma mater. Sullivan made them sing "heck" and "heckuva" instead of "hell" and "helluva," and would not let them sing "dames." According to The Technique, "The club sang 'Dames' at rehearsal and brought down the house, only to have Sullivan give it the axe."

Then-Vice President Richard Nixon and Soviet premier Nikita Khrushchev sang the song together when they met in Moscow in 1959 to reduce the tension between them during the Kitchen Debate. As the story goes, Nixon did not know any Russian songs, but Khrushchev knew that one American song as it had been sung on the Ed Sullivan show.

"Ramblin' Wreck" has had many other notable moments in history. It has been reported to be the first school song played in space. Gregory Peck sang the song while strumming a mandolin in the movie The Man in the Gray Flannel Suit. John Wayne whistled it in The High and the Mighty. Tim Holt's character sings a few bars of it in the movie His Kind of Woman. Gordon Jones sings a few stanzas several times in the movie My Sister Eileen. There are numerous stories of commanding officers in Higgins boats crossing the English Channel on the morning of D-Day leading their men in the song to calm their nerves.

== Modern history ==
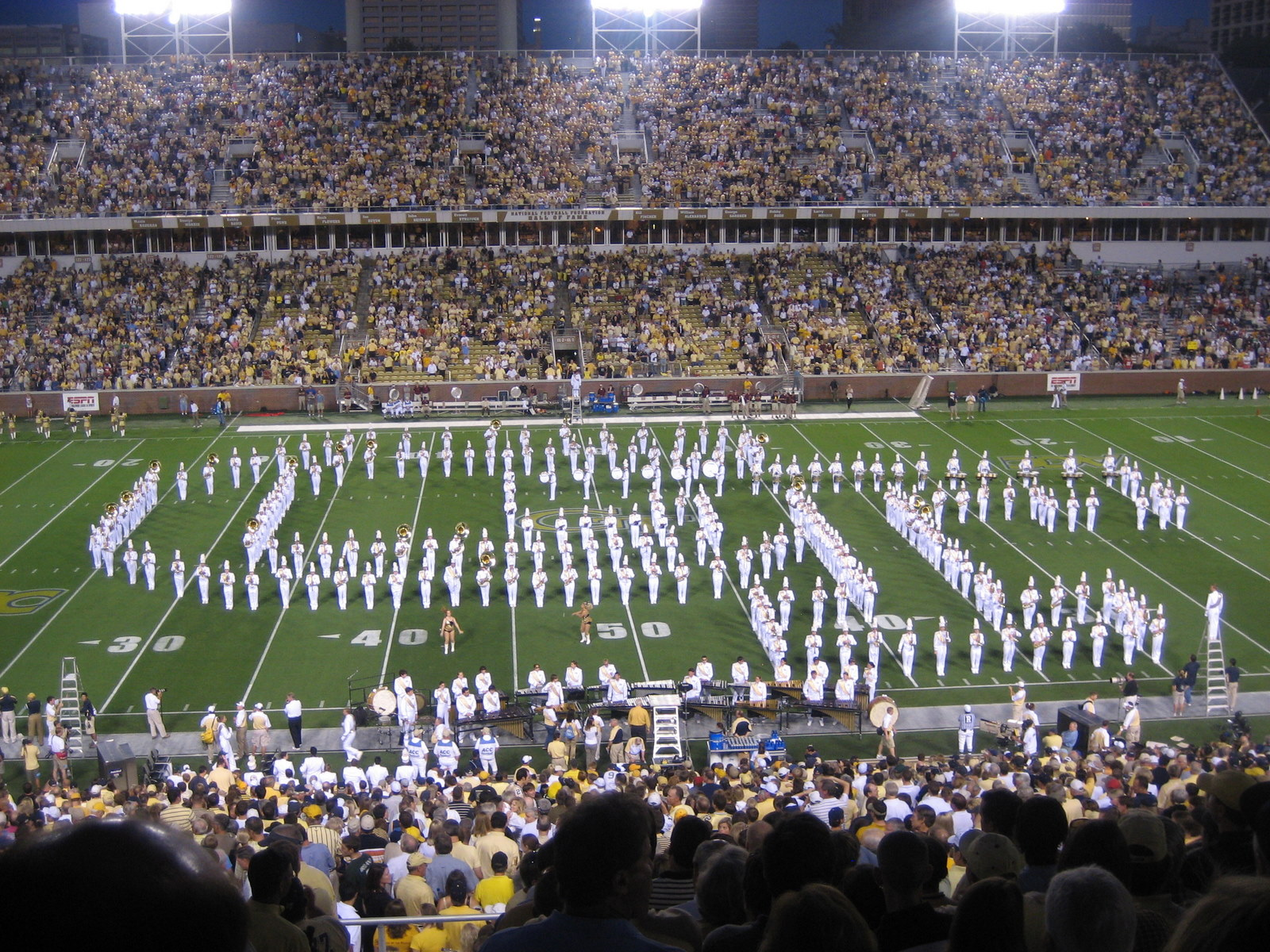
The Georgia Tech Yellow Jacket Marching Band at Bobby Dodd Stadium.

The Edwin H. Morris & Company obtained a copyright to Roman's version in 1931. The copyright to that version expired in 1952, so Greenblatt wrote a new arrangement and applied for a new copyright. In 1953, Greenblatt sold the copyright for the new version to Georgia Tech for one dollar. There was some controversy when MPL Communications acquired the old copyright; a law firm commissioned by Georgia Tech in 1984, Newton, Hopkins & Ormsby, concluded that while there were copyrighted versions of the song, the version used by the school was not copyrighted and falls in the public domain.

Over the years, a few variations of the song have been created at Georgia Tech. In 1998, a 19-member "Diversity Task Force" proposed that changes be made to the song because it discriminated against women. The proposal was widely and strongly opposed by students and alumni, and it was dropped. A different request to change the word cheer to join with respect to alumni daughters surfaced in 2015. Over the years, a few variations of this song have been created at Georgia Tech; "To cheer the brave and bold." is often substituted with "To increase the ratio," "To raise the ratio," "To help the ratio," or "To boost the ratio" as a reference to the large ratio of undergraduate men to women. Women, especially alumni, often substitute "Like his daddy used to do." with "Like his mommy used to do." At the conclusion of the song there is a call of "Go Jackets!" responded to with "Bust their ass!" Following three of these calls and responses, the song was ended with a call of "Go Jackets! Fight! Win!" However, the student body has yelled "Fight! Win! Drink! Get Naked!" and more recently "Fight! Win! Drink! Get Naked! Drink More! Get More Naked!"

On March 28, 2018, a German version of the song premiered during the Ivan Allen College of Liberal Arts Distinguished Alumni Awards event. The German version, written and arranged by Stephen C. Hall (Industrial Management, 1967), Jerry A. Ulrich (School of Music), and Richard Utz (School of Literature, Media, and Communication), was performed by the Georgia Tech Glee Club in honor of the awarding of the College's Dean's Appreciation Award to Barry (Mechanical Engineering, 1965) and Gail Spurlock, in recognition of their support for program initiatives in Germany, specifically Georgia Tech's German and German Languages for Business and Technology.

== Works cited ==
- McMath, Robert C.; Ronald H. Bayor; James E. Brittain; Lawrence Foster; August W. Giebelhaus; Germaine M. Reed (1985). Engineering the New South: Georgia Tech 1885–1985. Athens, GA: University of Georgia Press. ISBN 0-8203-0784-X.
- Wallace, Robert (1969). Dress Her in WHITE and GOLD: A biography of Georgia Tech. Georgia Tech Foundation.
