= Georgia Tech Yellow Jacket Marching Band =

Marching band of the Georgia Institute of Technology

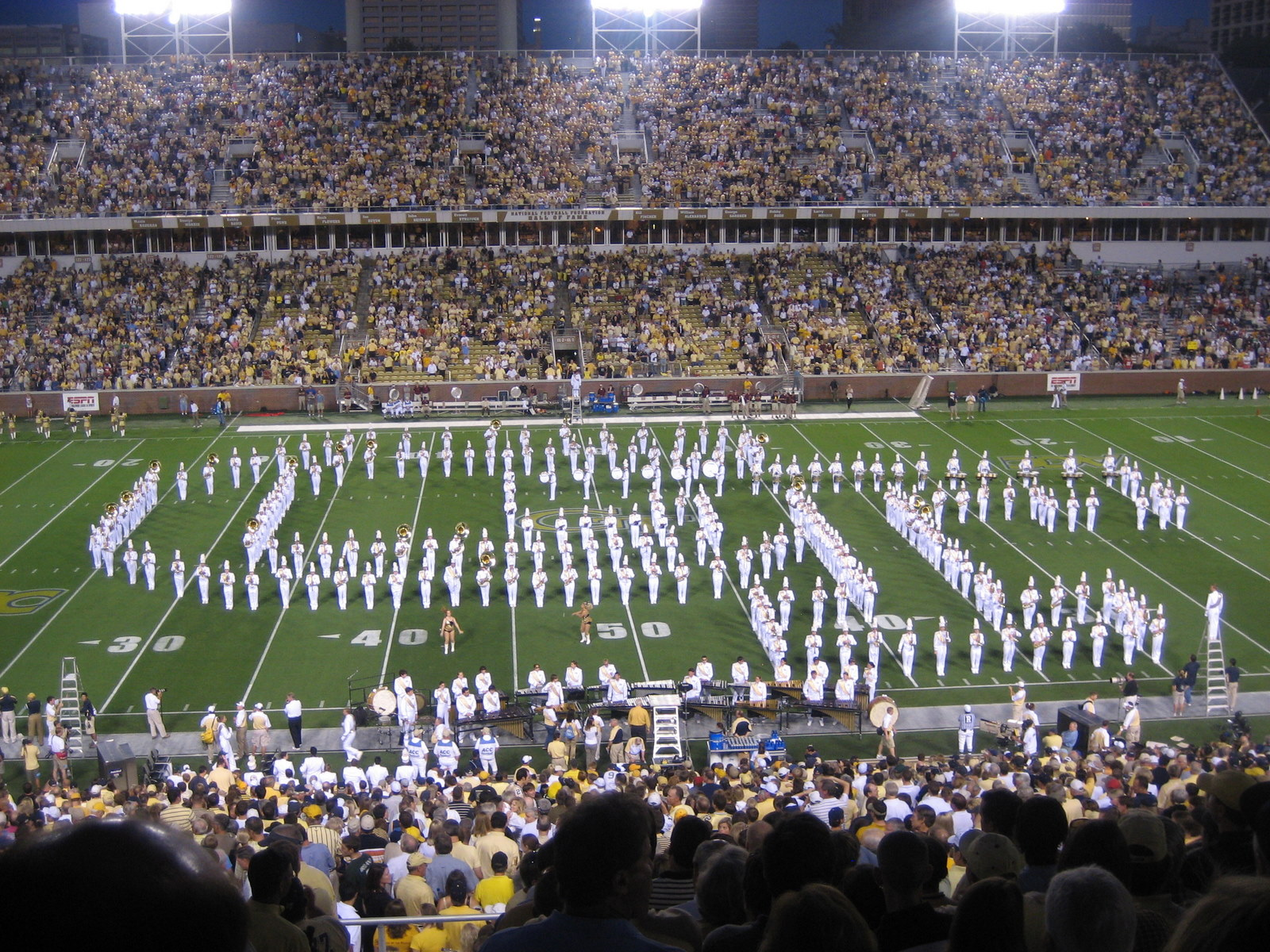
- School: Georgia Institute of Technology
- Location: Atlanta, Georgia
- Conference: Atlantic Coast Conference
- Founded: 1908
- Director: Chris Moore
- Assistant Directors: Benjamin Diden; Cameron "Chip" Crotts
- Members: 320
- Fight song: "Ramblin' Wreck from Georgia Tech" and "Up With the White and Gold"
- Website: marchingband.gatech.edu

The Georgia Tech Yellow Jacket Marching Band is the official marching band of the Georgia Institute of Technology. Founded in 1908 by a group of 14 students, the Georgia Tech Band is one of the school's oldest student organizations.

The Yellow Jacket Marching Band performs at all home football games, and the pep band, composed of a contingent of marching band members, plays at all home basketball and volleyball games. At least a portion of the marching band or pep band travels to most away games, as financed by the Georgia Tech Athletic Association.

== History ==
=== Early years ===
Includes the directorships of Robert L. Bidez (pre-1908-1912), Mike Greenblatt (1912-1913), and Frank Roman (1913-1929)

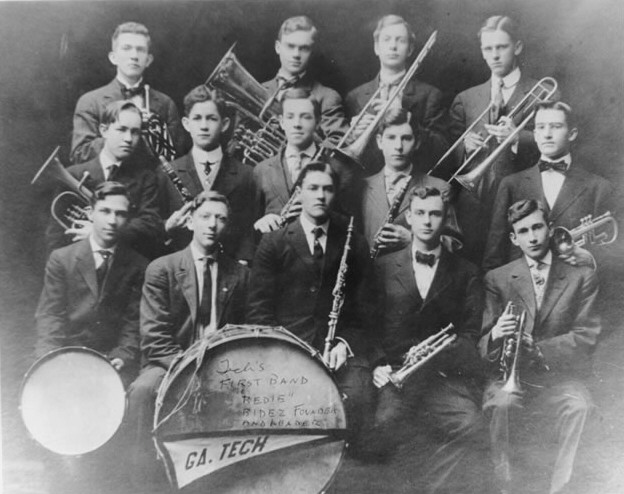
Founded in 1908, the first band at Georgia Tech had only 14 members.

Robert L. "Biddy" Bidez of Mobile, Alabama founded the Georgia Tech band in 1908 along with 13 other students. Bidez was the student leader of the band from its inception in 1908 until he graduated from the school in 1912 with a degree in Textiles. The band was first chartered on January 1, 1911, making it one of the school's oldest student organizations. M.A. "Mike" Greenblatt was a student who directed the band from the Fall of 1912 through 1913.

Frank "Wop" Roman was Georgia Tech's first professional band leader. He came to Tech in 1913 to play piccolo in the band, and became the director the next fall. He continued until his death on December 19, 1928. He wrote Tech's Alma Mater, as well as the arrangements for Ramblin' Wreck and Up With the White and Gold. Georgia Tech was the first Southern college to have its songs recorded; they were marketed by the Columbia Graphophone Company starting on November 13, 1925. Since then, the songs have been published in a variety of compilations. The Iota chapter of Kappa Kappa Psi, a national honorary band fraternity, was founded under Roman's directorship in 1924.

=== Garing era ===
Includes the directorship of A. J. Garing (1929-1946)

In 1929, Major A. J. Garing was hired to replace Frank Roman. Garing was a member of the John Philip Sousa Band. In 1931, Georgia Tech's Alma Mater and the fight song "Up With the White and Gold" were copyrighted.

=== Sisk era ===
Includes the directorship of Ben Logan Sisk (1946-1975)

Ben Logan Sisk succeeded Major Garing, and served as director until his retirement in 1975. In 1954, two of the nine women who were enrolled at Tech, trombonist Teresa Thomas and flutist Paula Stevenson, became the first female members of the band. Also during his term as director, the Music Department was established under Tech's general college and participation in the band and other music programs could be counted as free elective academic credits. The band also found its first permanent home in the Crenshaw Building, which was behind the Varsity Drive-In on 3rd Street. During this time the band would march through the 3rd street tunnel under the Atlanta Downtown Connector to get to the football games at Grant Field. The fans would know the band was on its way because the drum corps would line the sides of the tunnel as the rest of the band marched through it. The echoing drums could be heard in the stadium. Georgia Tech eventually sold the Crenshaw Building and the land to the Varsity, and the band moved into the former Church of God, on the corner of Ferst Drive and Hemphill Avenue.

In 1970, athletic director Bobby Dodd requested that the band no longer play Dixie at basketball games. Dodd later extended this request to football games as well. You've Said It All (Budweiser) was substituted for Dixie as the song played at the end of the third quarter of football games and during a later timeout in the second half of basketball games. The song was chosen because of the popularity of the song when the band had played it as part of an advertisement for the Atlanta Beverage Company.

The Epsilon Theta chapter of Tau Beta Sigma, an honorary band sorority, was founded in 1973 as the counterpart to Kappa Kappa Psi.

=== From activity to academics ===
Includes the directorship of Edward Bridges and Ken Durham (1975-1983) and part of James "Bucky" Johnson's directorship (1983-1995)

Edward Bridges was hired as the band's new director in 1975. Bridges came from an assistant directorship of the band at the University of Georgia (of which he was also an alumnus) and was also retired from the Air Force. Bridges' style of leadership differed greatly from Sisk's and created immediate tensions between him and the band's student leadership, which had traditionally been in charge of the band's day-to-day operations. Some former band members have posited that this was intentional, that the Institute administration was looking to take back control of the band from the students. It is unclear whether Bridges' selection as director was done with or without the input of the band's leadership at the time; however, Bridges abolished the student leadership structure upon taking the position. The positions of band officers remained, but in a significantly diminished capacity. Eventually, the clash between Bridges' leadership style and the band's culture resulted in Bridges' departure. He was replaced by Ken Durham, who had been hired as assistant band director in 1976. Durham had been a music educator in Atlanta for many years and had directed the band at Headland High School in the 1960s. He served as the band's director until 1983 when he accepted a promotion at his job at Ameriprise.

Despite tensions, the band, and in fact Tech's music program as a whole, underwent significant growth and changes during Bridges' tenure as band director and head of the music department. In the summer of 1975, the music department moved from the Crenshaw building to the Couch Building, formerly Couch Elementary School. In 1976, an institute restructuring moved the Music Department from the general college to the College of Sciences and Liberal Studies. This eventually allowed band members and members of other music programs to count their participation toward their degrees' humanities requirement rather than just a free elective.

In 1977, the Georgia Tech Jazz Ensemble was officially established by several band members with Doug Richards as its director. Following its informal formation in 1974, the Jazz Ensemble faced significant resistance against its formation by the band's student leadership. Sisk's retirement, the selection of Bridges as the band's new director, and the subsequent dismantling of the student leadership structure established under Sisk proved beneficial for the Ensemble. Bridges is credited with saving the Jazz Ensemble from an "early extinction" by providing its members with encouragement and suggesting that they submit a petition to the school to establish their practice sessions as a course offering. The Jazz Ensemble is currently under the direction of Professor Ron Mendola.

The Georgia Tech Band Alumni Association was founded in 1979.

Following the departure of Ken Durham, James "Bucky" Johnson was hired as Tech's first full-time director of bands. During his directorship, the Georgia Tech Band Club underwent changes with a revision of the Constitution of the Georgia Tech Band in 1988. In 1991, the Music Department expanded even further and was moved under the College of Architecture. In 1992, Johnson was named chair of the Music Department, and in 1995 the school began offering a certificate in music.

During halftime of the 1992 rivalry game at the University of Georgia, the band executed a prank that drew media attention and gained a level of notoriety. As the band took the field for its halftime performance, several band members carried a large tarp with the GT logo painted on it onto the field and used it to cover the logo painted at midfield commemorating UGA's football program's centennial. The band's performance could not be heard over the boos that were elicited from the home crowd. Reportedly, the stands remained full during the Georgia Tech band's performance and cleared out when the Redcoat Band took the field, as spectators delayed making trips to the concession stands in order to boo the Tech band's actions.

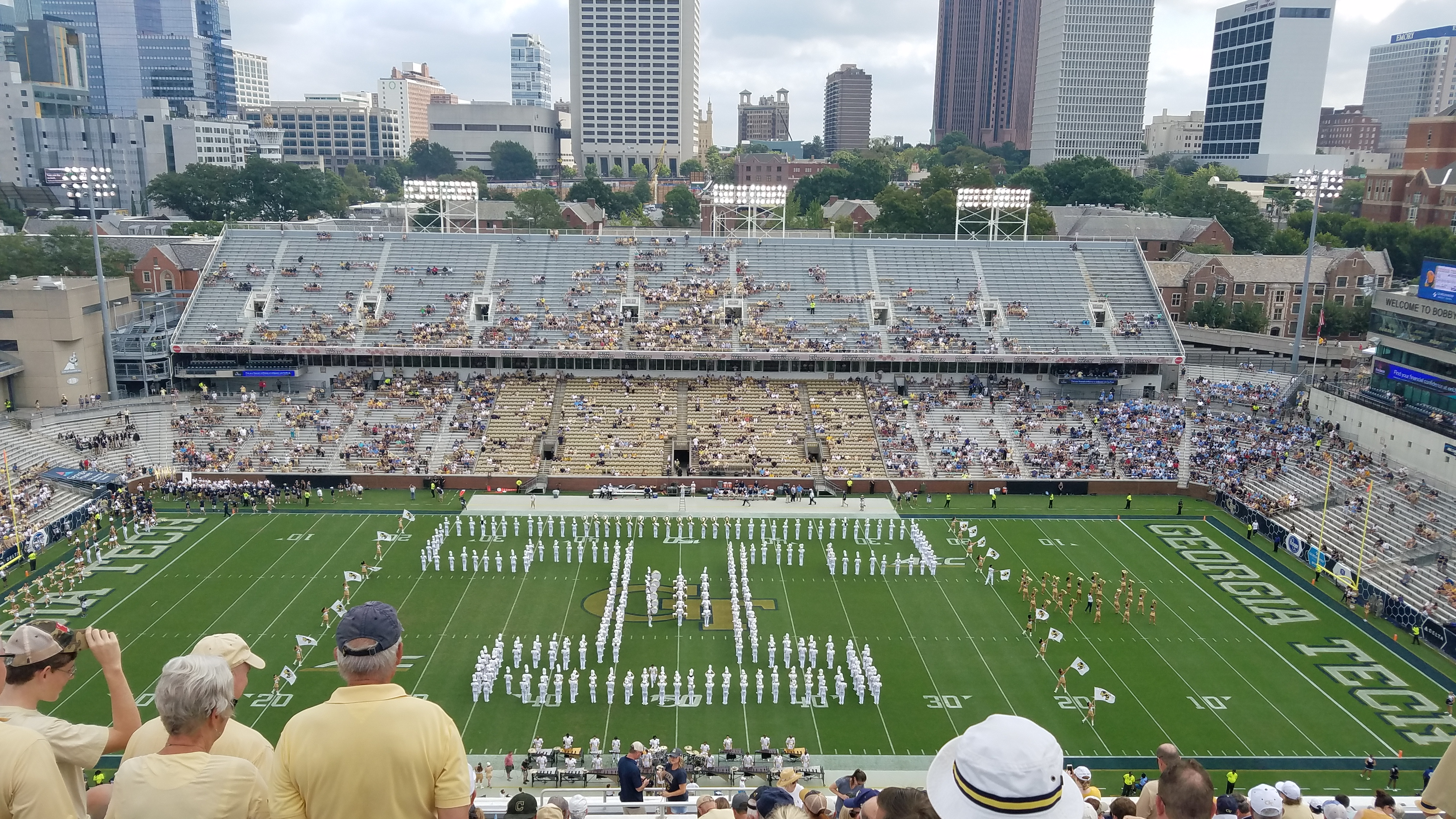
Georgia Tech Marching Band performing a pregame routine in 2019

=== Modern history ===
Includes the rest of James "Bucky" Johnson's directorship (1995-2002) and Andrea Strauss and Chris Moore's joint directorship (2002-present)

Leading up to the 1996 Olympic Games, Bucky Johnson was the director of the Atlanta Olympic Band in addition to being the director of the Georgia Tech Band. Prior to Atlanta winning the Olympic bid, Georgia Tech's pep band, and occasionally the entire marching band would dress in Olympic colors and play to greet dignitaries visiting the campus. The band marched in the parade celebrating Atlanta's selection as the 1996 Olympic host city.

In 2000, the marching band and symphonic band were invited to play in the 2001 St. Patrick's Day festivities in Dublin, Ireland. The marching band played in the parade, and the symphonic band played a concert in conjunction with the Dublin Institute of Technology. Upon Johnson's retirement in 2002, the marching band had nearly tripled in size, reaching a membership of around 350 students. Following Johnson's retirement, Andrea Strauss, formerly the assistant band director, was named Director of Bands and director of the Symphonic Band. Chris Moore was named Director of Athletic Bands.

Tech's first degree program in music, a Master of Science in Music Technology was approved in 2006. In 2007, 15 alumni trumpet players made commitments in support of an endowment which would provide an annual scholarship to a Georgia Tech trumpet player. The endowment and scholarship were conceived as a way to honor deceased trumpet alumni. Since 2005, three Tech trumpet players died either while still in school or not long after graduating. Prior to Tech's football season opener against Notre Dame on September 1, 2007, 150 members of the Georgia Tech Marching Band performed at the College Football Hall of Fame.

2008 marked the band's centennial. Band members and band alumni have been encouraged to contribute their memories and stories for possible inclusion in a book, which was slated for release in the fall of 2008. The band was also invited to march in the 2008 Macy's Thanksgiving Day Parade as part of its centennial celebration. The full membership of the marching band participated in the trip to New York. Most recently, the marching band has been invited to play in Italy during Summer 2012 for a music festival.

== Traditions ==
Georgia Tech Rat Cap inscription diagram.

=== RAT rules ===
Every year, a number of freshmen, most notably those in the marching band, wear gold caps known as RAT caps at each football game. RAT is short for Recruit At Tech, although freshmen are sometimes addressed as RATs, or "Recruits at Tech", the often cited "Recently Acquired Tech Student" is not the true meaning. The RAT caps are decorated with the football team's scores, the freshman's name, hometown, major, expected graduation date, and "To HELL With georgia" emblazoned on the back of the cap. Freshmen, or RATs, in the band are expected to wear their RAT caps during all official band functions, including rehearsals and football games.

=== RAT parents ===
The duty of RAT Parents was to initiate freshman members of the band and enforce RAT Rules. The modern role of RAT Parents is to introduce freshman band members, teach them Georgia Tech and band traditions, help them adjust to life at Tech and in the band, act as a friend, and advisor to them.

In the early days of the tradition, there was just a Rat Mom, who was always a male band member. Since the mid-1980s, there has been both a RAT Mom and a RAT Dad, the latter of which is always a female band member. Until 1990, the selection of Rat Parents was fairly informal. From 1990 to 1993, RAT Parents were selected by the band's executive board, partly to keep the decision in the hands of the students. When the executive board was dissolved in 1993, the selection was made by the director of bands following an interview process. More recently, RAT Parents are directly elected by the band as a whole. Beginning in 2022 the title of RAT Mom and RAT Dad was adapted into one title served by two individuals - RAT Parent. New RAT Parents are announced along with the new drum majors for the upcoming year.

== Alumni band ==
Founded in 1979, the Alumni Band's mission is to "help connect GT Band Alumni with current GT Band activities and to help support the GT Band." Most of the Alumni Band's activities center around homecoming. It often plays along with the current marching band in the stands and on the field at homecoming games. The Alumni Band is significantly involved with the forthcoming publication of a book about the history of the Georgia Tech Band, slated for release in the fall of 2008 in celebration of the band's centennial.

== Cross-registration ==
Through the Cross Registration Program in the Atlanta Regional Council for Higher Education (ARCHE), students at other colleges and universities without similar music programs are allowed to march in Georgia Tech's marching band. Students from Agnes Scott College, Brenau University, Clark Atlanta University, Clayton College & State University, Columbia Theological Seminary, Emory University, Georgia Gwinnett College, Interdenominational Theological Center, Mercer University Atlanta, Morehouse College, Morehouse School of Medicine, Oglethorpe University, Spelman College, and University of West Georgia are able to march in Georgia Tech's marching band after a successful audition process.

With the inauguration of the Georgia State University Marching Band in 2010 and the Kennesaw State Marching Owls in 2015, Georgia Tech no longer accepts any new wind or percussion cross-registration students. Students who had previously marched in the Georgia Tech Marching Band were grandfathered in and allowed to continue, pending a successful audition process.

== Marching ==
The Georgia Tech Marching Band typically marches two shows each season: a pregame show and a halftime show. However, shows are sometimes modified or substituted in the case of a special event. The pregame show remains largely the same from season to season and includes forms such as the interlocking "GT" and "Tech Tower". The "GT" is commonly photographed aerially, and this photo is one of the most widely used pictures of the band. It is also in this form that the football team, led by the Ramblin' Reck, runs onto the field.

The band marches in a traditional corps-style using a straight-leg glide step (“roll step”) technique.

== Gameday ==
=== Warm-up ===
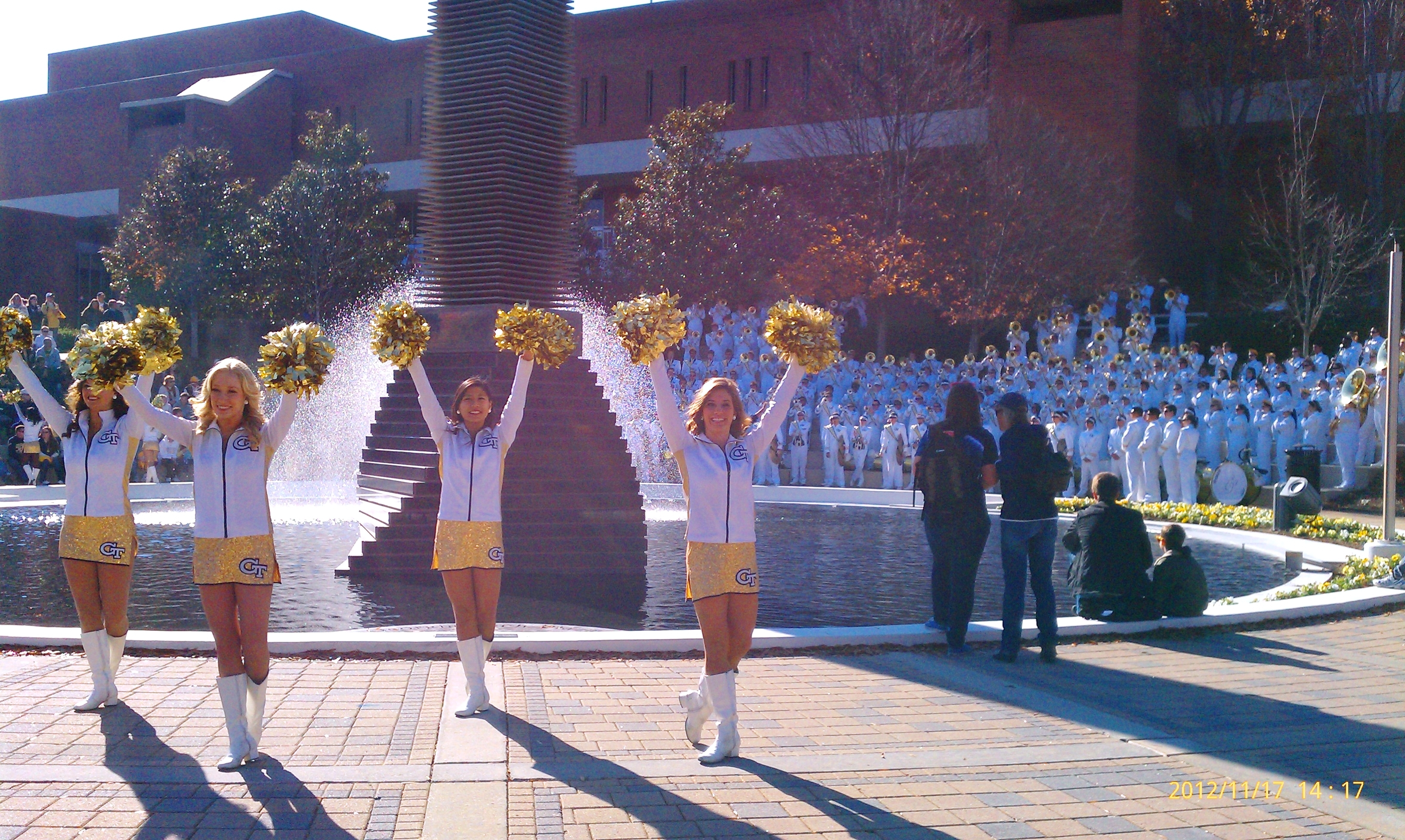
Pregame warmup at the Kessler Campanile

Before entering the stadium, the band assembles at the amphitheater by the Kessler Campanile for pregame warmup. Next the band plays "Budweiser" at the Library, then assembles at Cherry Street and Bobby Dodd Way to follow the Ramblin' Wreck car, Ramblin' Reck Club members and Buzz mascot, and marches down The Hill to Bobby Dodd Stadium, playing "White and Gold" and "Ramblin' Wreck".

Prior to 2023, the band joined fans and cheerleaders on the stairway at Callaway Plaza outside the north end of the stadium, where it played "O Fortuna", the "Fanfare", "White and Gold", and finished with "Ramblin' Wreck" before entering the stadium for the pregame show. In 2023, this routine was altered due to construction and features the band in the new Helluva Block Party on North Avenue, where the former stairway performance is now done.

=== Pregame show ===
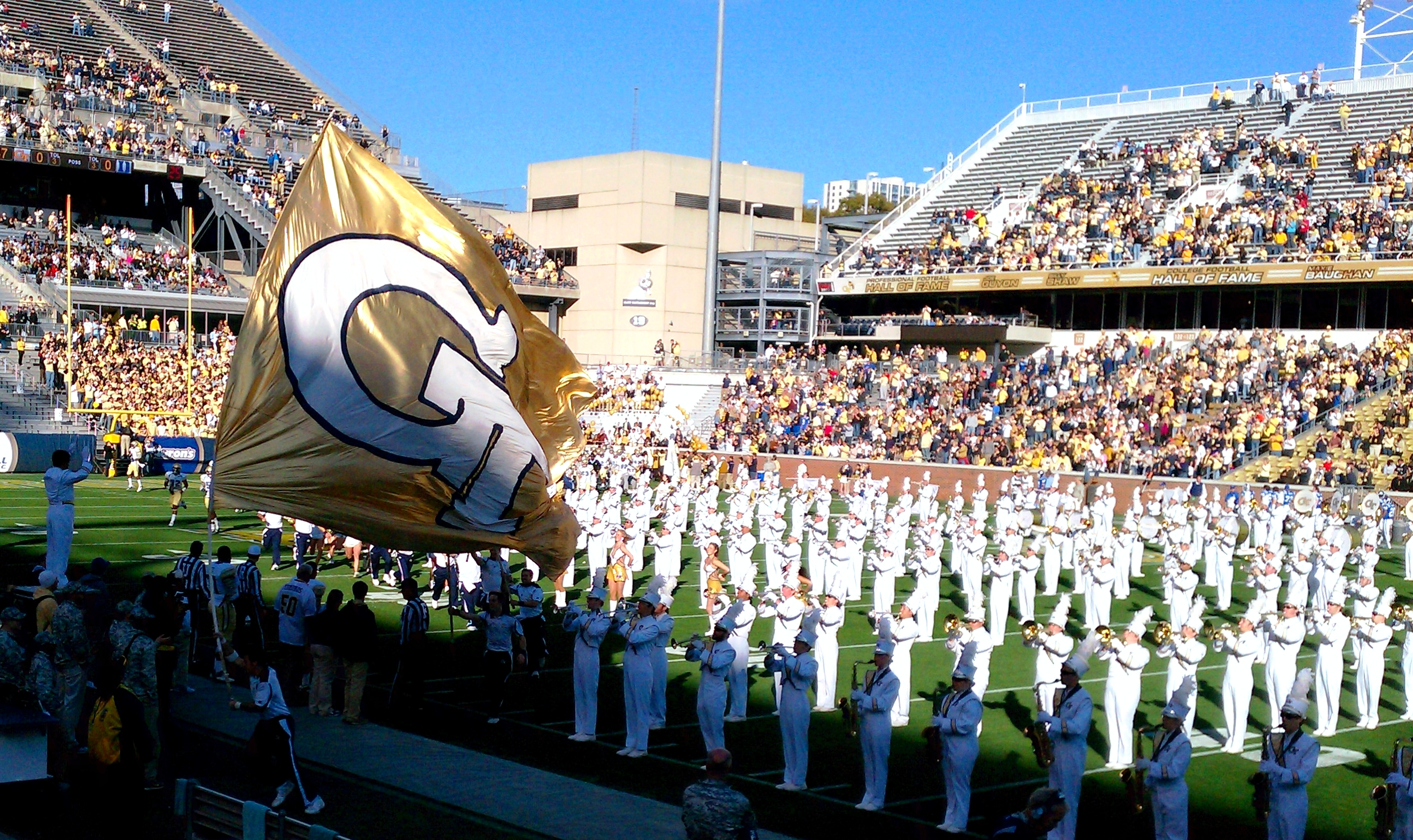
The band performs "Ramblin' Wreck" during the football team run-out

Starting in the 2007 football season, the marching band's pregame show has begun with the band's run-out from under the north stands of Bobby Dodd Stadium at Historic Grant Field. This pregame has included a work entitled "Fantasia on Georgia Tech Themes" by current band director Chris Moore. "Fantasia on Georgia Tech Themes" contains segments of the school's prominent songs (Ramblin' Wreck, White and Gold, and the Alma Mater). The band marches from the north end zone to the south, reverses field and forms the block T, and finishes with forming the Tech Tower. The National Anthem is played facing the west stands, followed by the Alma Mater. Then the band continues with "White and Gold" while forming the interlocking GT on the field. The band remains in this formation while the pregame announcements and videos are played. The Ramblin' Wreck leads the football team from the northeast corner of the stadium to the west sidelines while the band plays "Ramblin' Wreck". The band exits the field in the GT formation to take its place in the center of the lower north stands for the game.

=== Halftime ===
The band's halftime themes have varied over the years to include Latin and jazz, the 70's, hits from the band Chicago, etc.

=== The stands ===
In the stands, the band entertains fans during TV timeouts and revs up the crowd between plays on the football field. Favorites are the "Let's Go Tech" response cheer after first down plays, the "Go Jackets!" cheer or "White and Gold" tag after productive offensive plays, "School's Out for Summer" or "Mortal Kombat" after big defensive plays, Chords before 3rd down defensive plays, and the "Budweiser" song at the end of the third quarter. During the game, "White and Gold" is performed after GT touchdowns, while "Ramblin' Wreck" is played after field goals and successful extra point attempts.

Following home games, the band performs the fight songs. After postgame announcements, the band plays "The Horse". For the second half of The Horse, the band members spread out as far as possible in the stadium. A new tradition is that fans—especially The Swarm students in the north and northeast sections of the stadium—stay for "The Horse" to be played and dance along with the band.

== Linked organizations ==
=== Kappa Kappa Psi ===
The Iota chapter of Kappa Kappa Psi was founded on April 21, 1924, making it the sixth oldest active chapter of Kappa Kappa Psi and the oldest active chapter in the southeastern United States.

=== Tau Beta Sigma ===
The Epsilon Theta chapter of Tau Beta Sigma was founded on 12 May 1973. It is the ninth oldest active chapter in the Southeast District.

=== Georgia Tech Band Club ===
The Georgia Tech Band Club is a student organization dedicated to serving the band. Their primary goals include fostering music on campus, performing administrative and fundraising functions for the marching band and increasing school spirit through music. All active members of the marching band are also considered active members of Band Club, with dues being paid at band camp.
