= Arthur Murray =

American dance instructor (1895-1991)

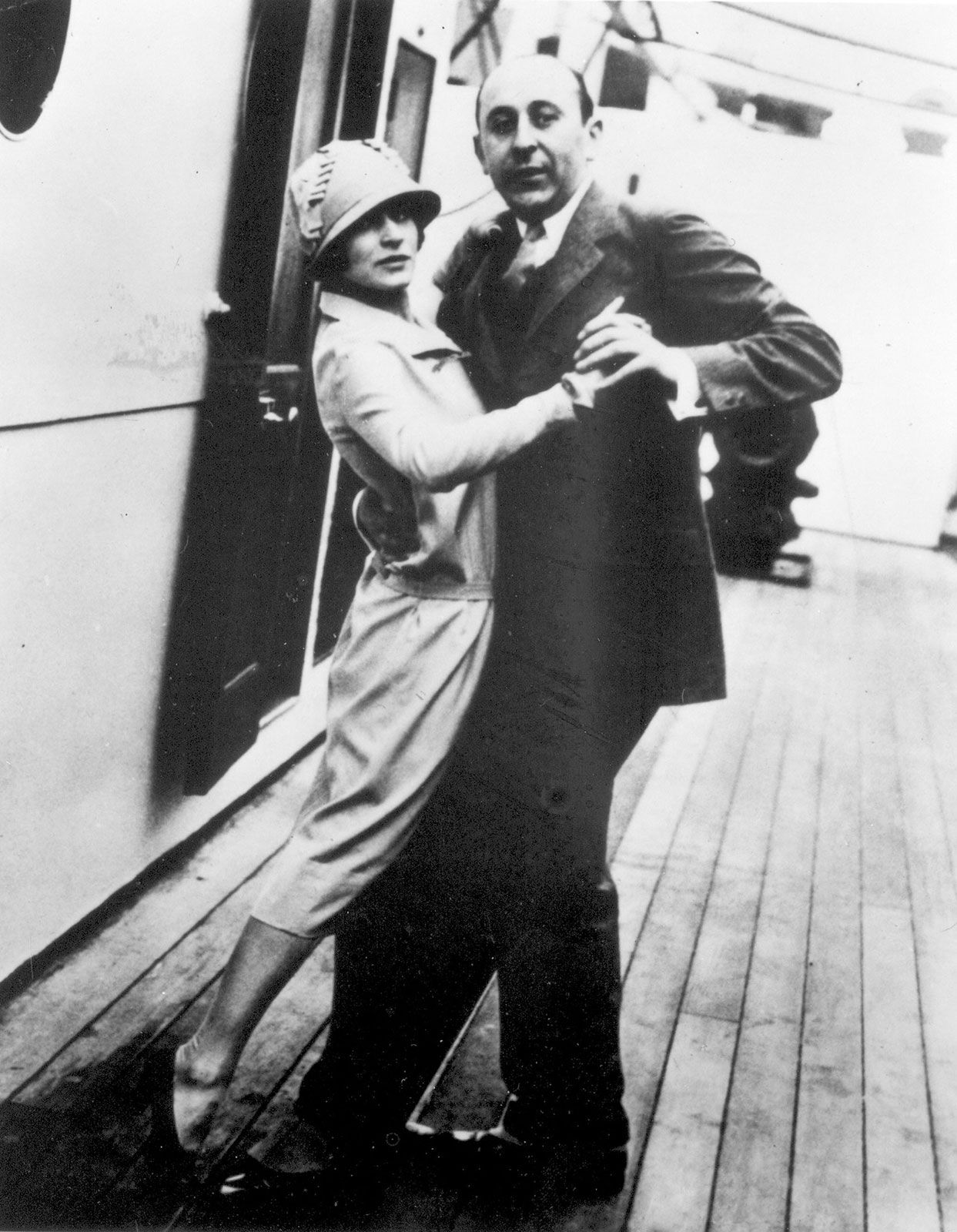
- Arthur Murray dances with his wife (1925)
- Born: Moses Teichmann; April 4, 1895; Podhajce, Kingdom of Galicia, Austria-Hungary
- Died: March 3, 1991 (aged 95); Honolulu, Hawaii, US
- Education: Georgia Institute of Technology
- Occupation: Founder of franchise "Arthur Murray Dance Studios"
- Years active: 1938–1991
- Spouse: Kathryn Kohnfelder (m. 1925)
- Children: 2
- Relatives: Henry Heimlich (son-in-law)

Arthur Murray (born Moses Teichmann; April 4, 1895 – March 3, 1991) was an American ballroom dancer and businessman, whose name is most often associated with the dance studio chain that bears his name.

== Early life and start in dance ==
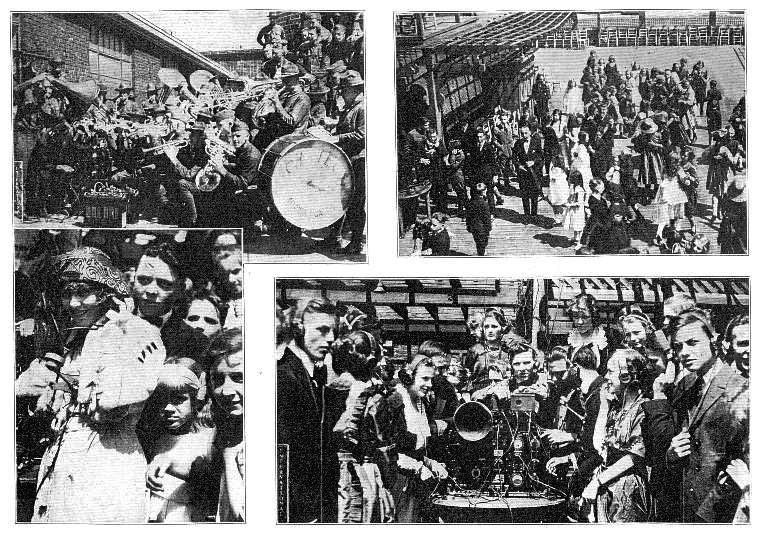
Arthur Murray's 1920 Radio Dance, as portrayed in the 1920 Blueprint; "Ramblin' Wreck" was one of the songs played that night.

Arthur Murray was born in 1895 as Moses Teichman in Galicia, Austria-Hungary, to a family of Jewish background. In August 1897, he was brought to America by his mother Sarah on the S.S. Friesland, and landed at Ellis Island. They settled on Ludlow Street, on the Lower East Side of Manhattan with his father, Abraham Teichmann.

He soon began teaching ballroom dancing to patients from the greater Boston area, at the Devereux Mansion Physical Therapy Clinic in Marblehead, Massachusetts, before moving to Asheville, North Carolina. Murray arrived at the Battery Park Hotel November 28, 1914, at age 19 and began teaching dance there. At the outbreak of World War I, under the pressure of the anti-German sentiment prevalent in the U.S., Murray changed his last name of Teichman to a less German-sounding name. The Asheville Citizen reported in 1920 that Murray had spent six summers teaching at the Battery Park. At that time, he had also begun his chain of dance studios and become a well-paid dance writer. He had also signed a deal to produce records for teaching dance for Columbia Gramophone Company. Murray released many successful dance records for Columbia as well as Capitol Records, some of which included coupons for dance lessons at Arthur Murray Studios.

In 1919, Murray began studying business administration at the Georgia School of Technology, and taught ballroom dancing in Atlanta at the Georgian Terrace Hotel. In 1920, he organized the world's first "radio dance"; a band on the Georgia Tech campus played "Ramblin' Wreck from Georgia Tech" and other songs, which were broadcast to a group of about 150 dancers (mostly Tech students) situated atop the roof of the Capital City Club in downtown Atlanta. He graduated from Georgia School of Technology in 1923.

On April 24, 1925, Murray married his famous dance partner, Kathryn Kohnfelder (September 15, 1906, Jersey City, New Jersey – August 6, 1999, Honolulu, Hawaii), whom he had met at a radio station in New Jersey. She had been in the audience while he was broadcasting a dance lesson.

== The start of Arthur Murray Studios ==
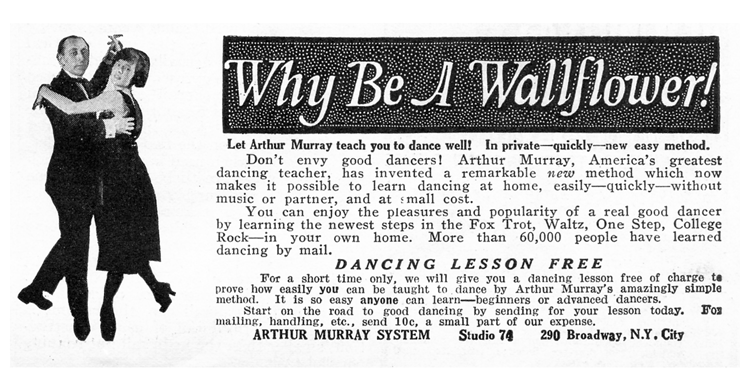
A 1922 advertisement for Arthur Murray's dance system

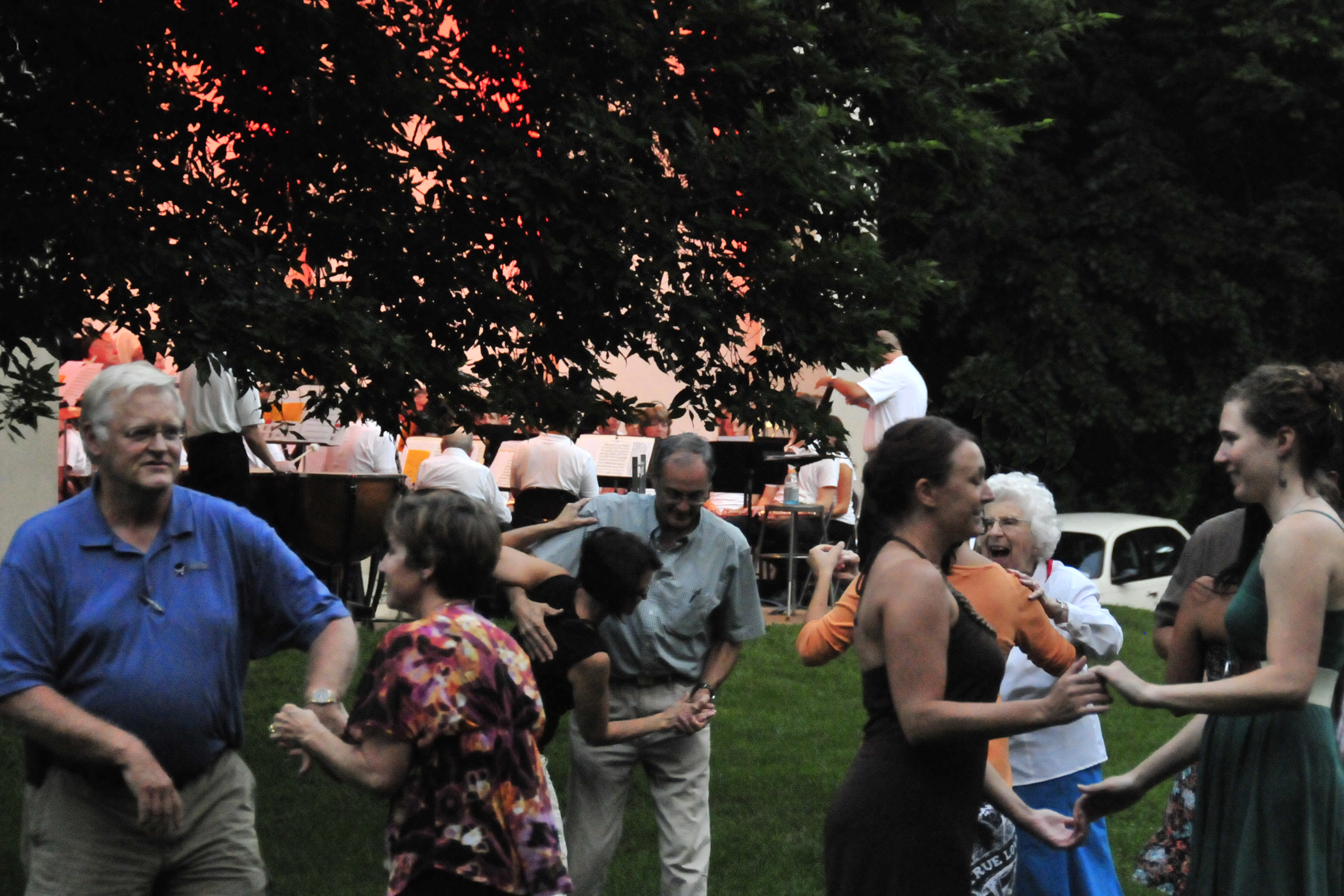
Arthur Murray dance class at a Municipal Band concert in Eau Claire, Wisconsin

After WWII, Murray's business grew with the rise of interest in Latin dance, and he regularly taught and broadcast in Cuba in the 1950s. Murray went on television with a dance program hosted by his wife, Kathryn; The Arthur Murray Party ran from 1950 to 1960, on CBS, NBC, DuMont, ABC, and then on CBS.

Among the Arthur Murray dance instructors in the early 1950s was aspiring TV and film director Harvey Hart (thereby supporting himself while attending the Dramatic Workshop wing of Manhattan's New School for Social Research), and future television evangelist D. James Kennedy, who won first prize in a nationwide dance contest.

As for Murray himself, two notable appearances include that of Mr. and Mrs. Murray as interview subjects of Edward R. Murrow on the December 30, 1955 episode of Person to Person, as well as Arthur's 1956 turn as one of the featured 'mystery' guests on the June 17 episode of What's My Line?.

The Murrays retired in 1964; but they continued to be active for some time, appearing as guests on the Dance Fever disco show in the late 1970s. By then, there were more than 3,560 dance studios bearing his name. In 2020, about 275 Arthur Murray Studios remained in operation. Arthur Murray Dance Studios claims to be the second-oldest franchised company (the first, A&W Restaurants, began in 1919). In 2012, Arthur Murray Studios celebrated more than 100 years of teaching dance at over 270 Arthur Murray Dance Studios in 22 countries across the globe. These range from studios in Australia (where the prestigious Crows Nest and Parramatta Dance Studios are located) and throughout North America, South America, Europe and Asia.

== Death ==
For many years, Murray had two homes – one in Honolulu and another in Rye, New York. He died at his Honolulu home at the age of 95; according to his daughter, Phyllis Murray McDowell, pneumonia was the cause of death. He had been active and in good health until a short time before his death.

== In popular culture ==
Hal Borne and His Orchestra recorded the Mercer-Schertzing song in a Soundie released May 25, 1942, with the Three Murtah Sisters.

The name and franchise of Arthur Murray were prominently referenced in the popular song "Arthur Murray Taught Me Dancing in a Hurry", published in 1942 by Johnny Mercer and Victor Schertzinger. The song was featured in the film The Fleet's In and was covered by various artists, including the Jimmy Dorsey Orchestra and Betty Hutton.

Arthur Murray is mentioned in Richard Brautigan's book "Dreaming of Babylon".

Arthur Murray and his dance lesson patterns are mentioned in Steve Goodman's song, "Would You Like To Learn To Dance?"

Arthur Murray is mentioned in Dirty Dancing movie as Johnny's dance teacher.

Arthur Murray is mentioned in the 1953 popular song "Just Another Polka" written by Frank Loesser and Milton DeLugg.
