= Bedie Bidez =

Bedie Bidez may refer to:

- P. R. "Bedie" Bidez (1892–1961), American football player and director of Auburn University Marching Band from 1919 to 1951.
- Robert L. "Bedie" Bidez, first director of Georgia Tech Yellow Jacket Marching Band.
