= Clean, Old-Fashioned Hate =

College football rivalry in Georgia, US

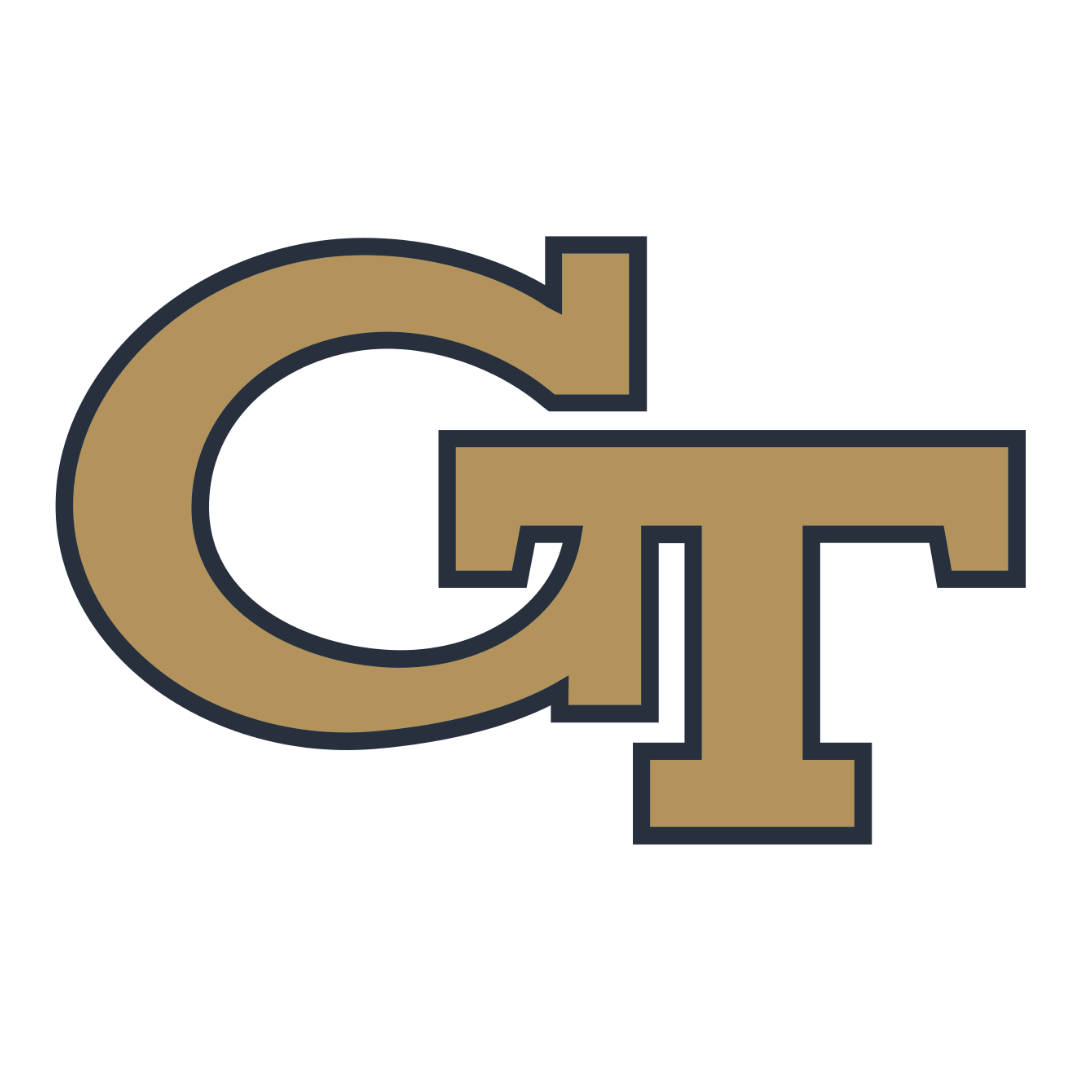
- Georgia Bulldogs Georgia Tech Yellow Jackets
- First meeting: November 4, 1893; Georgia Tech, 28–6
- Latest meeting: November 28, 2025; Georgia, 16–9
- Next meeting: November 28, 2026
- Trophy: Governor's Cup

Statistics
- Total meetings: 119
- All-time series: Georgia leads, 73–41–5
- Largest victory: Georgia Tech, 48–0 (1943)
- Longest win streak: Georgia Tech, 8 (1949–1956); Georgia, 8 (2017–present)
- Current win streak: Georgia, 8 (2017–present)

Locations of Georgia and Georgia Tech

Clean, Old-Fashioned Hate is an American college football rivalry between the Georgia Bulldogs and the Georgia Tech Yellow Jackets. The two southern universities are located in the U.S. state of Georgia, with their main campuses separated by about 70 miles (110 km). They have been heated rivals since 1893.

The athletics rivalry between the two institutions has traditionally focused on football, a sport in which both programs have historically been successful, with an annual game often held on Thanksgiving weekend. However, they compete in a variety of other intercollegiate sports, as well as competing for government and private funding, potential students, and academic recognition regionally and nationally.

The University of Georgia (commonly referred to as UGA or simply as Georgia) is a liberal arts research university located in the college town of Athens. The Georgia Institute of Technology (commonly referred to as Georgia Tech, Tech, or GT) is a science, technology, engineering, and mathematics research university with a metropolitan campus in Midtown Atlanta. Georgia competes athletically in the NCAA's Southeastern Conference, while Georgia Tech has competed in the Atlantic Coast Conference since 1979, after leaving the SEC in 1964.

The two teams have each won four national titles in football: Georgia Tech won the national championship in 1917, 1928, 1952, and 1990, while Georgia won it in 1942, 1980, 2021, and 2022. Georgia has also won a national title in baseball, in 1990. Both schools have also seen prominence in men's basketball, with Georgia Tech reaching the Final Four in the NCAA Division I men's basketball tournament in 1990 and 2004, advancing to the national championship game in 2004. Georgia made the Final Four in its first tournament appearance in 1983.

== Series history ==
=== Establishment ===
The University of Georgia is the oldest land-grant university in the United States, founded on January 27, 1785. Georgia Tech was founded 100 years later on October 13, 1885. Patrick Hues Mell, the president of the University of Georgia at that time, was a firm believer that the new school should be located in Athens alongside UGA's main campus, like the Agricultural and Mechanical School. Despite Mell's arguments, the new school was ultimately built near what were then the northern city limits of Atlanta.

The first known hostilities between the two schools date back to 1891. The University of Georgia's literary magazine declared the school's colors to be "old gold, black, and crimson." Dr. Charles H. Herty, the first UGA football coach, felt that "old gold" was too similar to yellow and that yellow "symbolized cowardice." Also in 1891, a student vote chose old gold and white as Georgia Tech's school colors. After the 1893 football game against Tech, Herty removed old gold as an official school color. Tech first used old gold for their uniforms, as a proverbial slap in the face to UGA, in their first unofficial football game against Auburn in 1891. Georgia Tech's school colors were henceforth old gold and white.

=== Wartime disruption ===
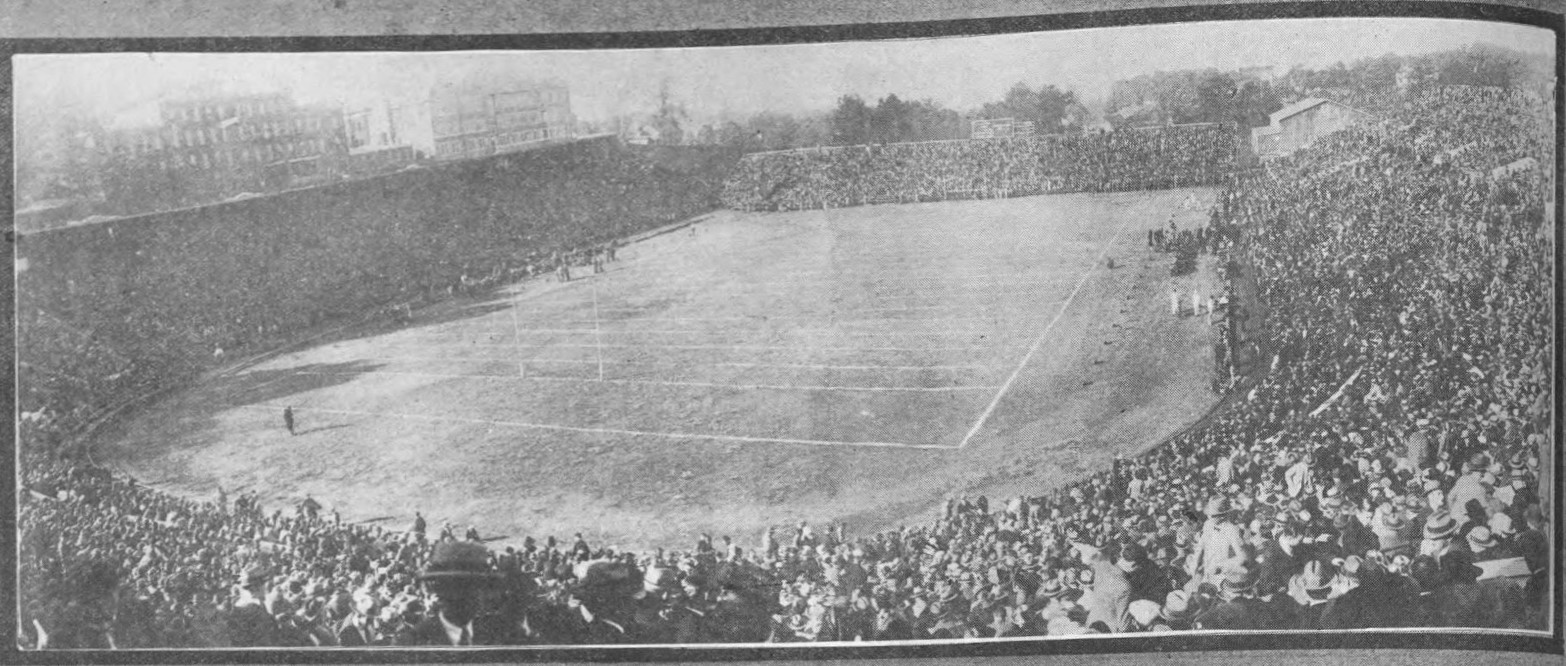
Grant Field prior to the 1925 football game

Fuel was added to the fire in 1919, when UGA mocked Tech's continuation of football during the United States' involvement in World War I. At the time, Tech was a military training ground and had a complete assembly of male students. Many schools, such as UGA, had lost the vast majority of their able-bodied male students to the war effort, forcing them to temporarily suspend football during the war. As a result, UGA did not play a football game in 1917 or 1918. When UGA renewed its program in 1919, the student body staged a parade which mocked Tech's continuation of football during times of war. The parade featured a tank-shaped float emblazoned with the words "UGA IN ARGONNE" followed by a yellow-clad donkey and a sign that read "TECH IN ATLANTA". This act led directly to Tech cutting athletic ties with UGA and canceling several of UGA's home football games at Grant Field (UGA commonly used Grant Field as its home field). Tech and UGA did not compete against each other in athletics again until the 1921 Southern Conference basketball tournament. Regular-season competition was not renewed until a 1925 agreement between the two institutions.

=== Series information ===
Until Vince Dooley became Georgia's head coach in 1964, the rivalry was fairly evenly matched, with Tech holding a slim 27–26–5 series lead. This is mostly due to the success of Georgia Tech's hall-of-fame head coach Bobby Dodd, who had a 12–10 record against the Bulldogs. During his tenure, the Yellow Jackets won eight games in a row against UGA from 1949 to 1956. During these eight years, Tech dominated UGA, outscoring the Bulldogs 176–39. However, when Dooley took over at UGA in 1964, the rivalry flipped. Dooley went 19–6 against Georgia Tech, including a 3–0 head-to-head record against Dodd. Since 1969, UGA has dominated the rivalry, posting a 42–14 record against Georgia Tech. During this time the Bulldogs have had win streaks of six games (1978–1983), seven games (1991–1997), seven games (2001–2007), five games (2009–2013) and eight games (2017–present). Former Georgia coach Mark Richt finished with a record of 13–2 against Tech, while now-retired GT head coach Paul Johnson finished with a record of 3–8 against UGA. 2014 was the first year that a game went to overtime at Sanford Stadium. GT went on to win the game 30–24. In 2018, Georgia beat Tech in Athens 45–21. As of 2025, Georgia Tech is in the midst of a more than twenty-year home drought against the Bulldogs, having failed to beat Georgia in Atlanta since 1999. The Yellow Jackets lost to their in-state rivals 52–7 and 45–0 at Grant Field in 2019 and 2021, respectively, the largest-ever margins of victory for the Bulldogs. However, Georgia Tech holds the record for the single largest margin of victory with a 48–0 win over UGA from 1943. (Note: Georgia disputes games played in 1943 and 1944.) The matchup has gone into overtime four times throughout the history of the series, including a 44-42 win for the Bulldogs after eight consecutive overtime periods in Athens in 2024.

=== Fight songs ===
The fight songs, sung at every sporting event, have even been tailored to the rivalry. The "Ramblin' Wreck from Georgia Tech" was first published in the Georgia Tech yearbook, The Blueprint, and was written following the first Georgia football game in which Georgia fans harassed the Georgia Tech players and fans. Hence the infamous chorus "To Hell with Georgia" was written. "Up With the White and Gold", published in 1929, featured the lyrics "Down with the red and black" and even "Drop the battle axe on Georgia's head." Georgia's unofficial fight song, "Glory, Glory" was arranged in 1909 and remains unchanged to this day. Officially, the end of the fight song is "G-E-O-R-G-I-A", but Georgia students change the lyrics to "To hell with Georgia Tech!" during the Georgia-Georgia Tech game. In more recent years, students have replaced Georgia Tech in the song with the name of whatever school they are playing at the time. The official fight song of The University of Georgia is "Hail to Georgia", although many observers erroneously infer that the official fight song is "Glory, Glory" because it is played when a touchdown is scored.

== Game results ==
Georgia victories	Georgia Tech victories	Tie games

No.	Date	Location	Winner	Score
1	November 4, 1893	Athens	Georgia Tech	28–6
2	October 23, 1897	Athens	Georgia	28–0
3	October 22, 1898	Athens	Georgia	15–0
4	October 28, 1899	Athens	Georgia	20–0
5	October 13, 1900	Atlanta	Georgia	12–0
6	October 25, 1902	Atlanta	Tie	0–0
7	October 24, 1903	Atlanta	Georgia	38–0
8	November 12, 1904	Atlanta	Georgia Tech	23–6
9	November 18, 1905	Atlanta	Georgia Tech	46–0
10	November 10, 1906	Atlanta	Georgia Tech	17–0
11	November 2, 1907	Atlanta	Georgia Tech	10–6
12	November 20, 1909	Atlanta	Georgia Tech	12–6
13	November 19, 1910	Atlanta	Georgia	11–6
14	November 18, 1911	Atlanta	Georgia	5–0
15	November 16, 1912	Atlanta	Georgia	20–0
16	November 15, 1913	Atlanta	Georgia	14–0
17	November 14, 1914	Atlanta	Georgia Tech	7–0
18	November 13, 1915	Atlanta	Tie	0–0
19	November 18, 1916	Athens	Georgia Tech	21–0
20	November 14, 1925	Atlanta	Georgia Tech	3–0
21	November 13, 1926	Atlanta	Georgia	14–13
22	December 3, 1927	Atlanta	Georgia Tech	12–0
23	December 8, 1928	Atlanta	Georgia Tech	20–6
24	December 7, 1929	Athens	Georgia	12–6
25	December 6, 1930	Atlanta	Georgia	13–0
26	November 28, 1931	Athens	Georgia	35–6
27	November 26, 1932	Atlanta	Tie	0–0
28	November 25, 1933	Atlanta	Georgia	7–6
29	December 1, 1934	Athens	Georgia	7–0
30	November 30, 1935	Atlanta	Georgia Tech	19–7
31	November 28, 1936	Athens	Georgia	16–6
32	November 27, 1937	Atlanta	Tie	6–6
33	November 26, 1938	Athens	Tie	0–0
34	December 2, 1939	Atlanta	Georgia Tech	13–0
35	November 30, 1940	Athens	Georgia	21–19
36	November 29, 1941	Atlanta	#20 Georgia	21–0
37	November 28, 1942	Athens	#5 Georgia	34–0
38	November 27, 1943	Atlanta	#14 Georgia Tech	48–0 (Note: The University of Georgia's athletic association lists the Bulldogs' 1943 and 1944 losses, but does not include them in the series win–loss record. In 1949, Dan Magill, UGA's publicity director, put asterisks by the two games due to Georgia Tech assisting in the war effort by housing a Naval training center during World War II which he claimed gave an unfair advantage those two years; Georgia Tech's athletic association includes the Yellow Jackets' 1943 and 1944 wins in the series record.)
39	December 2, 1944	Athens	Georgia Tech	44–0
40	December 1, 1945	Atlanta	#18 Georgia	33–0
41	November 30, 1946	Athens	#3 Georgia	35–7
42	November 29, 1947	Atlanta	#9 Georgia Tech	7–0
43	November 27, 1948	Athens	#12 Georgia	21–13
44	November 26, 1949	Atlanta	Georgia Tech	7–6
45	December 2, 1950	Athens	Georgia Tech	7–0
46	December 1, 1951	Atlanta	#6 Georgia Tech	48–6
47	November 29, 1952	Athens	#3 Georgia Tech	23–9
48	November 28, 1953	Atlanta	#10 Georgia Tech	28–12
49	November 27, 1954	Athens	Georgia Tech	7–3
50	November 26, 1955	Atlanta	#9 Georgia Tech	21–3
51	December 1, 1956	Athens	#4 Georgia Tech	35–0
52	November 30, 1957	Atlanta	Georgia	7–0
53	November 29, 1958	Athens	Georgia	16–3
54	November 28, 1959	Atlanta	#6 Georgia	21–14
55	November 26, 1960	Athens	Georgia	7–6
56	December 2, 1961	Atlanta	Georgia Tech	22–7
57	December 1, 1962	Athens	Georgia Tech	37–6
58	November 30, 1963	Atlanta	Georgia Tech	14–3
59	November 28, 1964	Athens	Georgia	7–0
60	November 27, 1965	Atlanta	Georgia	17–7

No.	Date	Location	Winner	Score
61	November 26, 1966	Athens	#7 Georgia	23–14
62	November 25, 1967	Atlanta	Georgia	21–14
63	November 30, 1968	Athens	#4 Georgia	47–8
64	November 29, 1969	Atlanta	Georgia Tech	6–0
65	November 28, 1970	Athens	#16 Georgia Tech	17–7
66	November 25, 1971	Atlanta	#7 Georgia	28–24
67	December 2, 1972	Athens	Georgia	27–7
68	December 1, 1973	Atlanta	Georgia	10–3
69	November 30, 1974	Athens	Georgia Tech	34–14
70	November 27, 1975	Atlanta	#15 Georgia	42–26
71	November 27, 1976	Athens	#4 Georgia	13–10
72	November 26, 1977	Atlanta	Georgia Tech	16–7
73	December 2, 1978	Athens	#11 Georgia	29–28
74	November 24, 1979	Atlanta	Georgia	16–3
75	November 29, 1980	Athens	#1 Georgia	38–20
76	December 5, 1981	Atlanta	#2 Georgia	44–7
77	November 27, 1982	Athens	#1 Georgia	38–18
78	November 26, 1983	Atlanta	#7 Georgia	27–24
79	December 1, 1984	Athens	Georgia Tech	35–18
80	November 30, 1985	Atlanta	Georgia Tech	20–16
81	November 29, 1986	Athens	#18 Georgia	31–24
82	November 28, 1987	Atlanta	#14 Georgia	30–16
83	November 26, 1988	Athens	#20 Georgia	24–3
84	December 2, 1989	Atlanta	Georgia Tech	33–22
85	December 1, 1990	Athens	#2 Georgia Tech	40–23
86	November 30, 1991	Atlanta	#25 Georgia	18–15
87	November 28, 1992	Athens	#9 Georgia	31–17
88	November 25, 1993	Atlanta	Georgia	43–10
89	November 25, 1994	Athens	Georgia	48–10
90	November 23, 1995	Atlanta	Georgia	18–17
91	November 30, 1996	Athens	Georgia	19–10
92	November 29, 1997	Atlanta	#14 Georgia	27–24
93	November 28, 1998	Athens	#17 Georgia Tech	21–19
94	November 27, 1999	Atlanta	#20 Georgia Tech	51–48 ^{OT}
95	November 25, 2000	Athens	#18 Georgia Tech	27–15
96	November 24, 2001	Atlanta	#19 Georgia	31–17
97	November 30, 2002	Athens	#5 Georgia	51–7
98	November 29, 2003	Atlanta	#5 Georgia	34–17
99	November 27, 2004	Athens	#8 Georgia	19–13
100	November 26, 2005	Atlanta	#13 Georgia	14–7
101	November 25, 2006	Athens	Georgia	15–12
102	November 24, 2007	Atlanta	#6 Georgia	31–17
103	November 29, 2008	Athens	#18 Georgia Tech	45–42
104	November 28, 2009	Atlanta	Georgia	30–24
105	November 27, 2010	Athens	Georgia	42–34
106	November 26, 2011	Atlanta	#13 Georgia	31–17
107	November 24, 2012	Athens	#3 Georgia	42–10
108	November 30, 2013	Atlanta	Georgia	41–34^{2OT}
109	November 29, 2014	Athens	#16 Georgia Tech	30–24^{OT}
110	November 28, 2015	Atlanta	Georgia	13–7
111	November 26, 2016	Athens	Georgia Tech	28–27
112	November 25, 2017	Atlanta	#7 Georgia	38–7
113	November 24, 2018	Athens	#5 Georgia	45–21
114	November 30, 2019	Atlanta	#4 Georgia	52–7
115	November 27, 2021	Atlanta	#1 Georgia	45–0
116	November 26, 2022	Athens	#1 Georgia	37–14
117	November 25, 2023	Atlanta	#1 Georgia	31–23
118	November 29, 2024	Athens	#7 Georgia	44–42^{8OT}
119	November 28, 2025	Atlanta	#4 Georgia	16–9
Series: Georgia leads 73–41–5

=== Results by location ===
This is a list of results by location as of November 28, 2025.

City	Games	Georgia victories	Georgia Tech victories	Ties	Years played
Athens	52	34	17	1	1893–1899, 1916, 1929–present
Atlanta	67	39	24	4	1900–1915, 1925–present

== Traditions ==
It is common for Georgia fans to refer to the Georgia Institute of Technology as Georgia Tech University, GTU, or North Avenue Trade School. The "GTU" nickname is derived from the common mistitle given to Georgia Tech in media outlets. Also, since Georgia Tech is an engineering school, Georgia fans often refer to Tech fans as nerds, dorks, Techies, or Gnats (acronym for Georgia North Avenue Trade School). The school's campus and Grant Field front North Avenue in midtown Atlanta, giving rise to the "Trade School" nickname. Grant Field is also very commonly referred to as "The Joke by Coke" by Georgia fans, based on its proximity to the headquarters of The Coca-Cola Company. Georgia fans also refer to the 600 level of Sanford Stadium as the "Tech Deck", due to the placement of Georgia Tech fans up in that section of the stadium.

In response, it is common for Georgia Tech fans to refer to UGA as the "university (sic) of Georgia" in printed media. The earliest use of this was in the Technique in 2000, where "University [sic] of Georgia" was used to imply it was a mistake to consider UGA a university. Later, it became common practice for Tech fans to leave the 'u' in university lowercase to avoid treating "University of Georgia" as a proper noun. The two practices have since merged, leading to the modern dysphemism and the widely used acronyms, "u(sic)GA" or simply "uGA."

A common rallying cry for students of Georgia Tech is the question "What's the good word?" to which the answer is "To Hell with Georgia!". In crowds, this is often called out by one person, and everyone else will shout the reply. This is repeated three times, and on the fourth time, they will then ask "How 'bout them Dawgs?" ("Piss on 'em!") Tech students have also created an unofficial fight song entitled '"To Hell With Georgia", which is set to tune of The Battle Hymn of the Republic and refers to UGA as "the cesspool of the South" and their fans as "poor old farmboys."

Another long-standing tradition at Georgia Tech, which began in 1915, requires freshmen to wear a RAT cap, which stands for "Recently Acquired Tech student", around campus, and most notably to football games. The caps are decorated with the football team's scores, the freshman's name, hometown, major, and expected graduation date, and "To HELL With georgia" emblazoned on the back of the cap, with "HELL" written as large as possible and "georgia" in all lowercase. Anti-hazing laws have loosened the strictness and overall participation by most students at Georgia Tech (except in the volunteer marching band), though freshman still receive and decorate their RAT caps at convocation.

The school newspapers of the two institutions often mock their rival institution. The Red and Black, Georgia's daily newspaper, usually has a few jokes and articles mocking Georgia Tech the week before the football game. The Technique, Georgia Tech's weekly newspaper, prints a larger, special edition mocking The Red and Black. The special edition features several articles of parody and humor based on fictitious happenings at the University of Georgia, and is known as "To Hell With Georgia", after the school's popular cheer. On years where the schools play their match at UGA's Sanford Stadium, Technique staff distribute the issue across UGA's campus.

UGA students traditionally ring the school's Chapel Bell until midnight following any home football win. However, when UGA beats Tech, the bell rings all night long. Tech has a similar tradition with its whistle. UGA's Chapel Bell and Georgia Tech's Ramblin' Wreck have been rumored to have been stolen numerous times by their respective rival before, after, or even during major sporting events between the two schools. The bulldog statue in front of UGA's Memorial Hall was once stolen by Tech students. The culprits put the UGA and Tech police on a scavenger hunt to find the missing statue. Many fans of the respective institutions refuse to even partake in clothing, food, or other materials of their rival's school colors. Examples include Georgia fans refusing to eat mustard or Georgia Tech fans refusing to use red pens.

Two Georgia Tech fight songs refer to UGA in their lyrics: "Up With the White and Gold" has the lyric "down with the Red & Black", and "Ramblin' Wreck from Georgia Tech" contains the lyric "To Hell with Georgia". No UGA fight song officially refers to Georgia Tech in any way, though at the conclusion of "Glory, Glory" students often change the final line from G-E-O-R-G-I-A to "and to Hell with Georgia Tech" as they do with all of their opponents.

== Sports ==
Current coaching matchups
Sport	UGA coach	Record vs. GT	GT coach	Record vs. UGA
Football	Kirby Smart	(8–1)	Brent Key	(0–3)
Baseball	Wes Johnson	(4-1)	James Ramsey	(1-0)
Basketball (M)	Mike White	(4–1)	Scott Cross	(0–0)
Basketball (W)	Katie Abrahamson-Henderson	(1–2)	Karen Blair	(0–1)
Tennis (M)	Manuel Diaz	(25–2)	Kenny Thorne	(1–14)
Tennis (W)	Jeff Wallace	(29–0)	Rodney Harmon	(0–2)
Softball	Lu Harris	(10–7)	Sharon Perkins	(4–2)
Volleyball (W)	Tom Black	(2–1)	Michelle Collier	(1–0)

=== Football ===
The game has been played 118 times according to Georgia Tech and only 116 times according to Georgia record books. Georgia discredits two games in 1943 and 1944 (both years in which Georgia Tech won) because many of their players went to fight in World War II, though official college football records include the games. The game has been played in either Athens or Atlanta alternating every year since 1928. Both Georgia Tech and Georgia hold 4 national titles for a total of 8 national titles between them. The two schools also have a total of 31 conference titles (15 for Tech, 16 for Georgia) between them, making the rivalry a battle between two historically prestigious programs.

The record between the two teams is 70 Georgia wins, 41 Georgia Tech wins, and 5 ties. Georgia Tech's longest winning streak, and the longest in the series, is eight games from 1949–1956. Georgia's longest winning streak in the series is also eight straight games from 2017 to present, tying the longest in the series. Georgia won the most recent game in the series on November 28, 2025 at Mercedes-Benz Stadium, in Atlanta, by a final score of 16-9. The victor wins the Governor's Cup. Like many rivalry games, the game is played during the final week of the college football season.

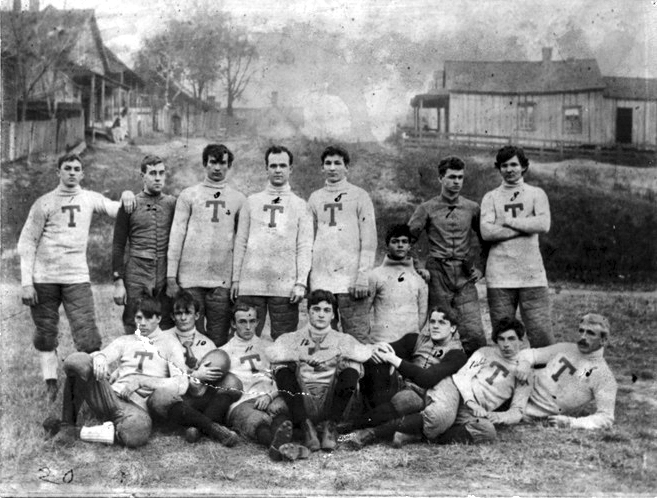
The first Georgia Tech football team

The first time the two teams met on the football field was on November 4, 1893. The Georgia School of Technology (Georgia Tech's original name) Blacksmiths led by coaches Stanley E. "Stan" Borleske and Casey C. Finnegan traveled 70 miles (110 km) by train to play the Georgia team coached by Ernest Brown in Athens at Herty Field. The Blacksmiths defeated Georgia handily 28–6 on four scores by Leonard Wood, a thirty-three-year-old United States Army physician and future Medal of Honor recipient. During and after the game, disgruntled Georgia fans threw rocks and other debris at the Georgia Tech players and chased the victorious Blacksmiths back to their awaiting train.

At one time early in the last half of the game, a stone was hurled at one of the Tech players, striking him a cruel blow in the head... At another time, one of the Athenians drew a knife and threatened one of the Techs' better players... The Techs were also poked and gouged with canes on plays toward the boundary lines... Some of the crowd had the privilege of the gridiron equally with the players.

The next day in the Atlanta Journal, an Athens journalist accused Tech of using "a heterogeneous collection of Atlanta residents – a United States Army surgeon, a medical student, a lawyer, and an insurance agent among them, with here and there a student of Georgia's School of Technology thrown in to give the mixture a Technological flavor." Hence, the sports rivalry was born.

1902 saw the series' first scoreless tie. Georgia came in as 6–1 favorites. "It's the worst game we have ever played." said Georgia captain Frank M. Ridley. On Tech was its first All-Southern player, Jesse Thrash.

In 1905, Tech beat Georgia 46–0. Craig Day returned a missed field goal 110 yards for a touchdown.

In 1908, UGA attacked Tech's recruitment tactics in football. UGA alumni incited a Southern Intercollegiate Athletic Association investigation into Tech's recruitment of a player UGA had recruited as well. The Georgia Alumni claimed that Tech had created a fraudulent scholarship fund, which they used to persuade the player to attend Tech rather than UGA. The SIAA ruled in favor of Tech, but the 1908 game was cancelled that season due to bad blood between the rivals.

The 1915 game was the second scoreless tie. John G. Henderson headed a group of three men, one behind the other with his hands upon the shoulders of the one in front, to counter John Heisman's jump shift offense.

The only true break in the series dates back to 1917 and the United States entry into World War I. The two institutions felt that the rivalry had grown too intense, fueled by Georgia's inflammatory accusations that Georgia Tech was cowardly because the school continued its football program during wartime while Georgia suspended its program for the football seasons of 1917 and 1918. Tech meanwhile won the South's first recognized national championship in 1917.

The game renewed play again in 1925. That year, a third-quarter field goal by Ike Williams was the only scoring in the game, giving Georgia Tech a 3–0 victory. Georgia end Smack Thompson would yell out in his sleep, and had said "Kill the SOB" in reference to Tech's star fullback Doug Wycoff leading up to the game. Once during the game, the two collided with each other, knocking each unconscious.

In 1927, Georgia's "dream and wonder" team marched onto Grant Field having won all its games and upset Yale. The Bulldogs were ensured a national championship with a victory. Georgia Tech won 12 to 0. The field was a muddy mess from the rain, and some Georgia supporters contended that Tech watered down the field.

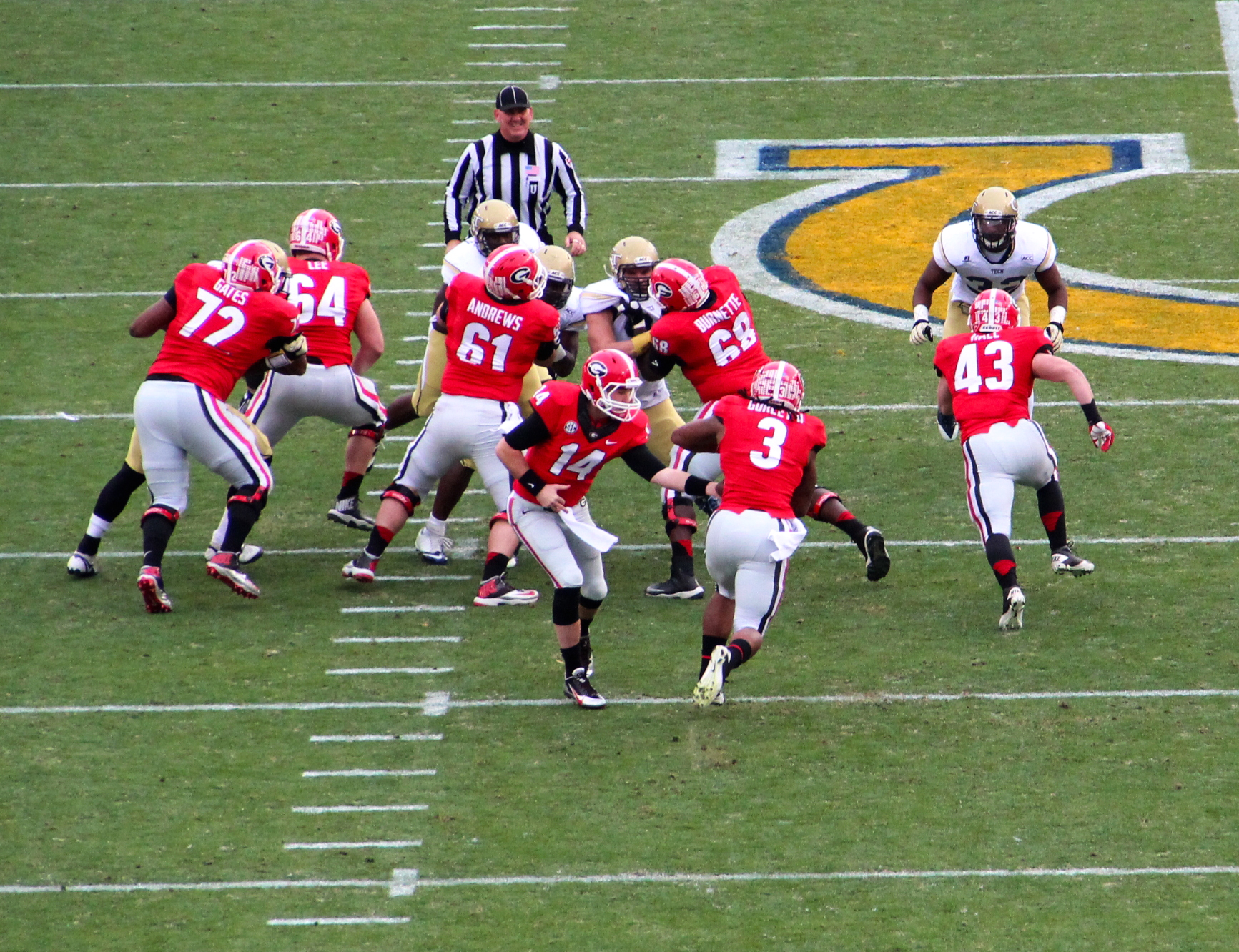
2013 edition of the Georgia Tech-UGA football game

In 1932, Georgia Tech and Georgia were two of the original 13 charter members of the Southeastern Conference. Georgia Tech would continue its membership until 1964 after Tech Coach Bobby Dodd began a historic feud with Alabama Coach Bear Bryant. Georgia Tech left the SEC concerning the allocation of scholarships and student athlete treatment. Georgia Tech would later attempt re-entry but the re-entry was eventually voted down. Lacking a league in which to compete, Georgia Tech helped charter the Metro Conference in 1975 for all sports besides football (in which it remained independent for nearly 20 years). Tech eventually joined the Atlantic Coast Conference in 1979, though it would not compete for the ACC football championship until 1983. Since 1978, Georgia has won 37 of the last 47 games against Georgia Tech. Georgia coaches Mark Richt and Kirby Smart have had a large part in the Bulldog's recent dominance over Georgia Tech, enjoying a 13–2 record and 7–1 record respectively, against the Yellow Jackets.

In 2020, the rivalry was not played for the first time since 1925 due to the COVID-19 pandemic, which resulted in the SEC limiting its schedule to conference-only play.

In 2024, Georgia came back from a 17–0 halftime deficit in Athens to force overtime. The game was decided in 8OT, which is the second-longest game in FBS history by total number of overtimes. This was the fourth time, and first since 2014, that the game was decided in overtime. The 2024 match-up is the longest game in the history of the series, and is referred to as "Clean, Old-Fashioned 'H8' or 'Eight'" by fans.

=== Basketball ===
The Georgia Tech and Georgia basketball rivalry can be just as heated as its football counterpart. The two teams have played 202 times, with Georgia Tech leading the series with 107 wins over Georgia's 95 wins. The first game between the two basketball teams was on March 10, 1906. Georgia Tech won the game 27–13 in Athens. The longest winning streak by UGA was 7 games, which occurred twice from 1909–1921 and from 1980–1984. Georgia Tech accumulated a 10-game winning streak, its longest over UGA, from 1958–1961. Like most series, there is a distinct advantage to being the home team. The home record since 1906 is 111–54 (67.7%) while 23 games in the series have been played on neutral courts.

The Georgia Tech vs. Georgia game was played in the Omni Coliseum for 14 years beginning in 1981 and ending in 1994. The series in the Omni favored the Yellow Jackets with an 8–6 record. The neutrality of the Omni, because of its proximity to Georgia Tech, came into question by the UGA athletic department in 1993 so the series was renewed as an alternating home court event. The home team has won every game but four since the home court advantage was reinstated, Georgia won two road games (2000, 2010); Georgia Tech won two (2011, 2013). Since 1994, the Tech-UGA basketball game has had the highest average attendance for both teams at their respective stadiums.

9 other games were played on neutral courts. These games occurred in the SIC Tournament (1921 and 1923), SEC tournament (1934, 1945, 1946, and 1948), and the Gator Bowl Tournament (1952, 1953, and 1960). Tech holds a 5–4 record in these tournaments over Georgia.

On an ironic note, after tornadoes forced the 2008 SEC men's basketball tournament to be moved from the Georgia Dome to Georgia Tech's home court Alexander Memorial Coliseum (now known as Hank McCamish Pavilion), the Bulldogs pulled off an unlikely stretch of three wins in thirty hours to win the tournament on their bitter rivals' home court.

The basketball rivalry has picked up intensity recently after Georgia Tech coach Josh Pastner's first tweet after being hired was #THWg (To Hell With Georgia). Pastner's Yellow Jackets however could not live up to the smack talk as the Bulldogs won convincingly 60–43 on the Yellow Jackets home court. Pastner’s second attempt to beat Georgia also fell short, as the Yellow Jackets were pummeled at Stegeman Coliseum by a score of 80–59.

In 2019, Georgia won again in a nailbiter 82–78. The teams did not meet during the 2020–2021 season due to COVID-19 restrictions. In 2021, the series started back up again. This time, the Jackets beat Georgia, ending their five year losing streak to the Bulldogs, by winning in Athens 88–78. It was Josh Pastner’s first win against Georgia.

The following year, the two teams played one of the most memorable games in the rivalry. Georgia led by first year head coach Mike White entered the game 7–2. Tech came into the game 5–3. In a game that featured 11 ties and 18 lead changes, the Jackets scored the last six points of the game to defeat the Bulldogs 79–77 in front of a rowdy home crowd at McCamish Pavilion.

=== Baseball ===
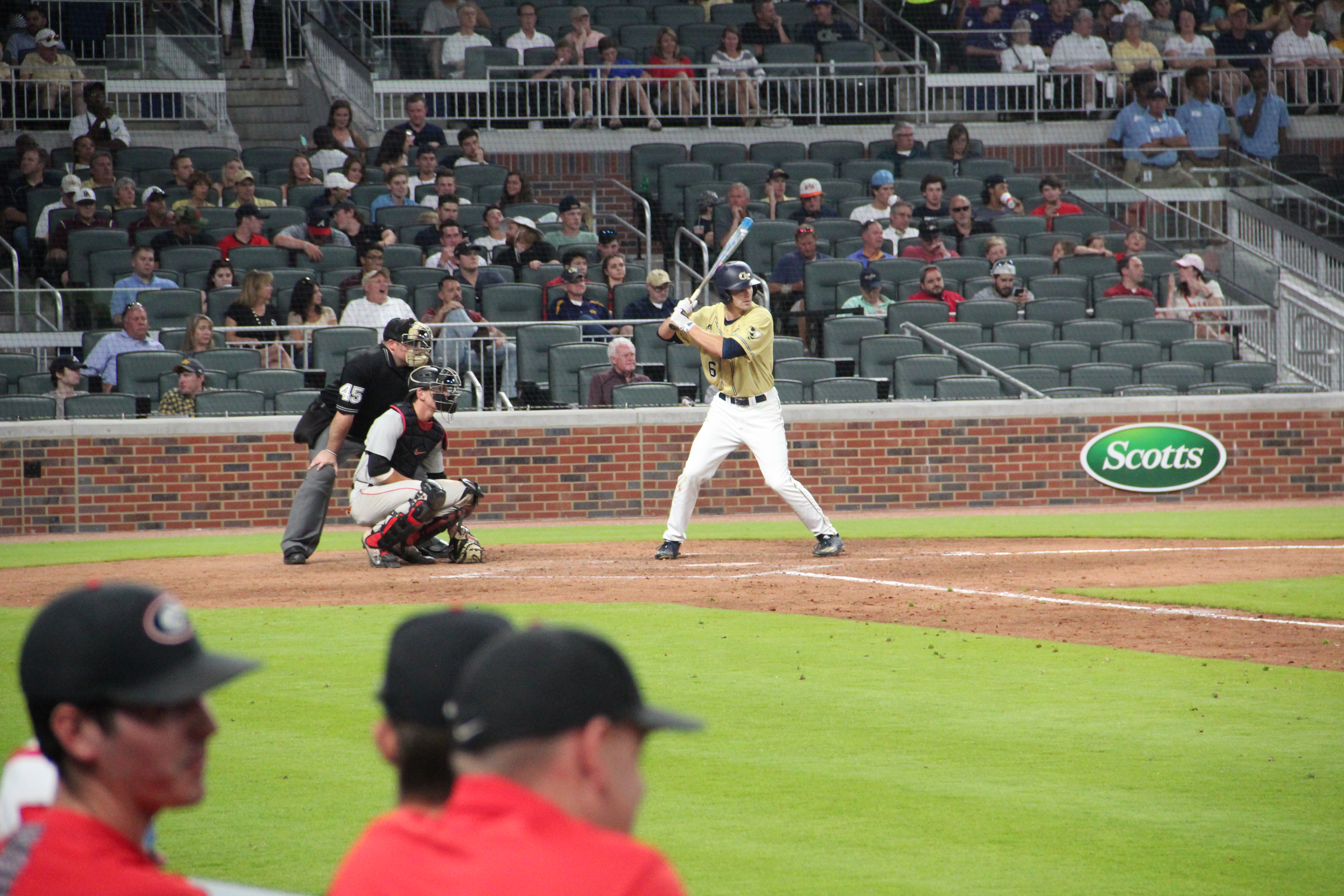
Georgia Tech and UGA at Truist Park, 2017

April 16, 1898, the first baseball game between Georgia and Georgia Tech, then known as the Georgia School of Technology was played with Georgia winning 18 to 4. The game was played at the newly created ballfields in Piedmont Park located in the center of the horse race track, almost exactly where they still are today. Piedmont Park served the Atlanta Crackers, the city's original professional baseball team, before they moved to a stadium on Ponce de Leon Avenue in 1904.

The two baseball teams have met 350 times since 1898. Georgia Tech has 149 wins, Georgia has 199 wins, and there are 2 ties in the series. Three baseball games are played between the two institutions every year. Two of the three games are played at the respective colleges' baseball stadiums while the finale is played at Truist Park, home of the Atlanta Braves. The 2004 Georgia Tech vs. Georgia Game at Turner Field had the second most spectators in college baseball history with 28,836 fans in attendance.

Between the two schools, Georgia holds the only National Title by besting Oklahoma State in the 1990 College World Series. Both Georgia and Georgia Tech have played in College World Series finals with Georgia competing in two (1990 and 2008) and Georgia Tech competing in one (1994).

Since the reformatting of the NCAA baseball tournament in 1999, Tech and UGA have hosted eight super regionals – the fourthmost super regionals hosted by a state behind California, Texas, and Florida. The two teams have met six times in the NCAA tournament with Georgia holding a 4–2 edge over Tech. Georgia has eliminated Tech three times in tournament play in 1987, 2001, and 2008. Tech avenged the 2001 elimination by eliminating UGA in 2002. Tech and UGA's latest meeting in the 2008 NCAA tournament saw UGA sweep Tech in a two game series, which eliminated Tech from the tournament.

In 2010, Georgia Tech swept the season series against UGA, winning games in Atlanta, at Turner Field, and a 25–6 win in Athens.

2017 was the first season the annual neutral site game was played at SunTrust Park (Truist Park's former name), the home of the Atlanta Braves. Both teams traded the lead throughout the game in front of a crowd of 23,737. Georgia completed the season sweep with an 8–7 victory.

From 2018 to 2024, the annual 3 game series between the two teams were played in a different location each game. One in Athens, one in Atlanta, and the finale in Gwinnett at Coolray Park. In 2024, the two teams played one extra game in the Athens Regional. The Bulldogs won 8-6 in 10 innings to win the regional.

In 2025, the series returned to Truist Park for one game on April 15. The Bulldogs won 5-2.

=== Other sports ===
Georgia Tech and Georgia enjoy healthy rivalries in all other sports in which the two universities compete, most notably softball, women's basketball, and various club sports.

In 2008, the cross country and track teams began a revival of what had once been a common occurrence with short series of events dubbed the "Old School" dual meets. The two teams competed in a total of five one-on-one competitions. The cross country events were hosted by Georgia, and the track events were held at the Georgia Tech Track, site of the 1996 Olympic Trials, in Atlanta. The Georgia men won at all five meetings. The tradition was unceremoniously terminated when the programs mutually agreed to expand the competition in their schedule.

Through August 29, 2008, the two women's volleyball teams have played 31 times, with Georgia leading the overall series with 21 wins over Georgia Tech's 10. However, Tech holds a 10–1 record since 1999, including a 7–1 mark since GT head coach Bond Shymansky took over the program in 2002. The only Georgia victory in this period came in 2005 in front of a record-breaking Georgia Bulldog crowd. Two of the last three meetings (2006 and 2007) were held in Georgia Tech's O'Keefe Gym, both in front of fire-code-limited 2000 spectators, while the latest match (2008) was held at Georgia with a crowd of 1,604.

== See also ==
- List of NCAA college football rivalry games
- List of most-played college football series in NCAA Division I
