= Frank Roman =

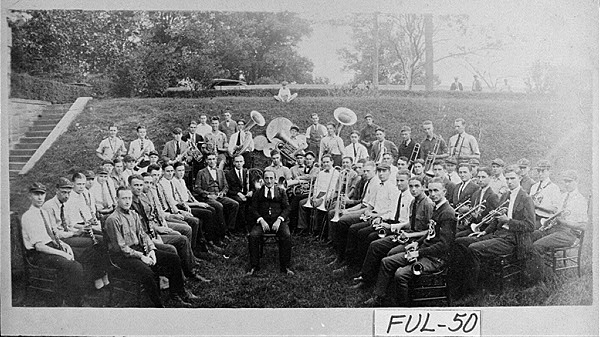
Frank Roman with the Georgia Tech Yellow Jacket Marching Band, 1920

Frank Roman (March 3, 1877 in Italy – December 19, 1928 in Atlanta, Georgia) was a musician, composer, and band director of the Georgia Tech Yellow Jacket Marching Band at the Georgia Institute of Technology from 1913 to 1928. He is most known for his arrangement of Georgia Tech's fight song, Ramblin' Wreck from Georgia Tech, which he copyrighted in 1919.

== Georgia Tech ==
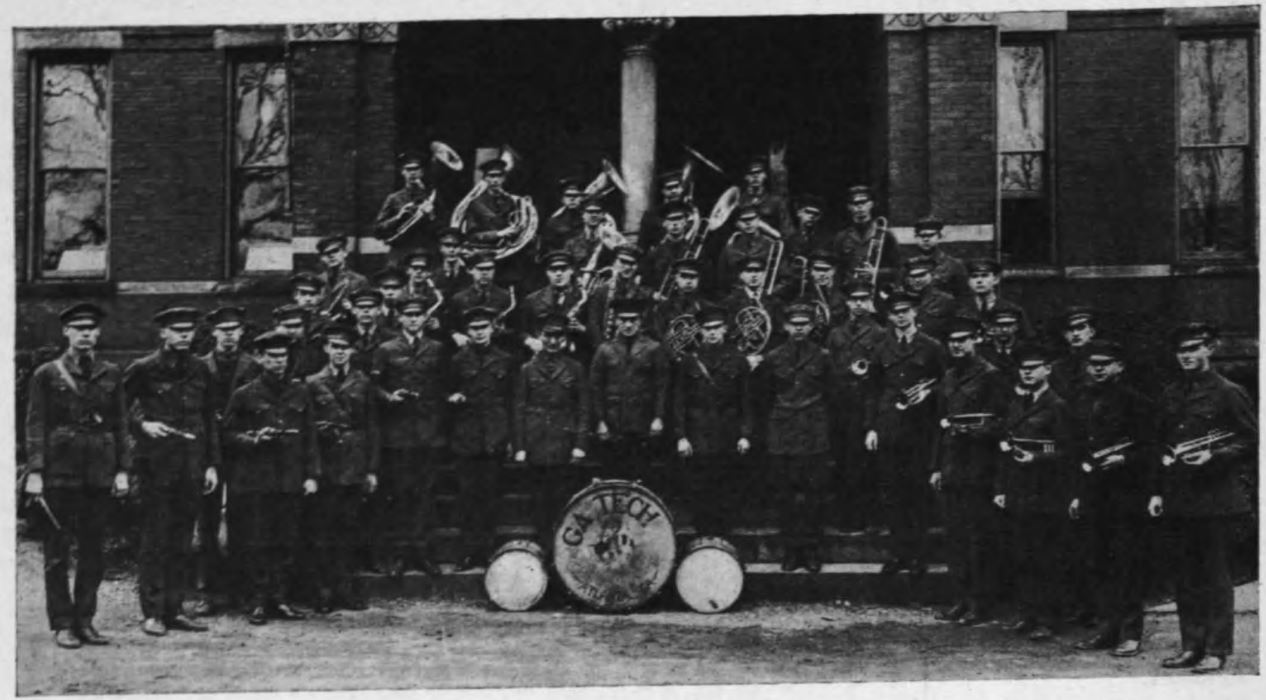
Roman with the Georgia Tech Yellow Jacket Marching Band, 1925

Roman was Georgia Tech's first professional band leader, succeeding Robert L. Bidez. He came to Tech in 1913 to play piccolo in the band, and became the director the next fall. He continued until his death on December 19, 1928. He wrote Tech's Alma Mater, as well as the arrangements for Ramblin' Wreck and Up With the White and Gold.

The Iota chapter of Kappa Kappa Psi, a national honorary band fraternity, was founded under Roman's directorship in 1924.
