= Up with the White and Gold =

Song
- Written: 1919
- Genre: Fight song
- Songwriter: Frank Roman

"Up with the White and Gold" is a fight song at the Georgia Institute of Technology. It is generally played after a touchdown in a Georgia Tech Yellow Jackets football game. The song's title refers to Georgia Tech's school colors and its lyrics contain the phrase, "Down with the Red and Black", an explicit reference to the school colors of the University of Georgia and the then-budding Georgia–Georgia Tech rivalry. Although published in 1919 by then-band director Frank Roman, the lyrics were published as early as 1916 in the Blueprint. It is set to the tune of "Stanford Jonah".

== Lyrics ==
Oh well it's up with the White and Gold,

Down with the Red and Black,

Georgia Tech is out for a victory.

We'll drop the battle-axe on georgia's head,

When we meet her our team is sure to beat her.

Down on the old farm there will be no sound

Till our bow-wows rip through the air; When the battle is over Georgia's team will be found

With the Yellow Jackets swarming around!
