= Robert L. Bidez =

Robert L.'Bedie' Bidez was the first director of the Georgia Tech Yellow Jacket Marching Band, which he founded in 1908 as a student at the Georgia Institute of Technology. He was succeeded in that role by Mike Greenblatt.

Bidez was a textile engineering graduate of 1912, vice president of the McGowan-Lyons Hardware and Supply Company in Mobile, Alabama.
