= Blueprint (yearbook) =

Official student yearbook of the Georgia Institute of Technology

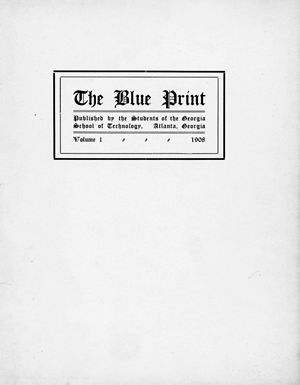
- Cover of The Blue Print, 1908
- Format: Print (Hardback)
- Owner: Georgia Tech
- Publisher: Georgia Tech Student Publications
- Editor: Rahul Deshpande
- Founded: 1908
- Headquarters: Atlanta, Georgia; United States
- Circulation: 4,000
- Price: Free
- Website: www.blueprintybk.netlify.app

Blueprint is the official student yearbook of the Georgia Institute of Technology. It was established in 1908 as The Blue Print and is the second oldest student organization on campus.

== History ==
The first issue was edited by John G. Chapman. It was published for the Georgia School of Technology, as Georgia Institute of Technology was known at the time. It featured sections on the history of the school, the classes, sports, organizations, fraternities, and advertisements. Sections were broken up with poems inserted throughout the book.

The yearbook was first published in 1908 under the name Blue Print. The publication won some prominent awards early on, including the American Award from the National Scholastic Press Association in 1930, 1931, and 1932. The name changed to Blueprint in 1956.

== Awards ==
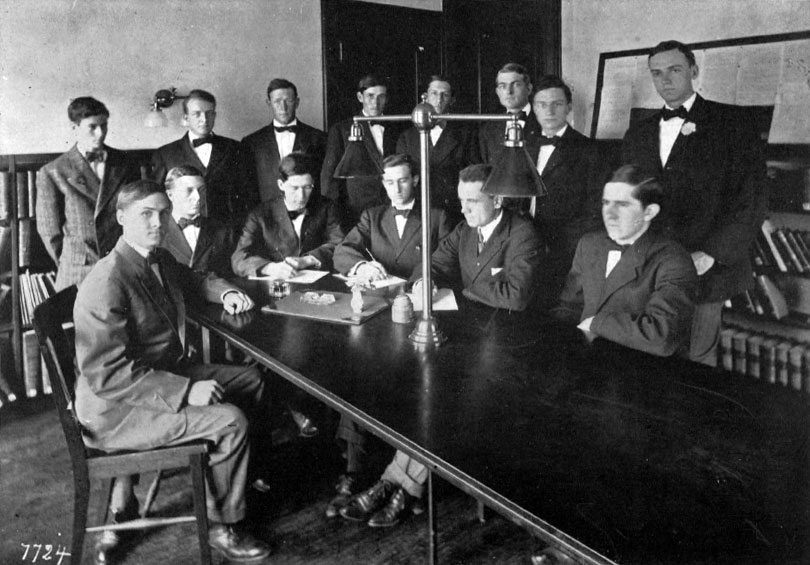
Editorial board of the 1908 Blue Print.

Blueprint has won the following awards:

- 2012: Silver Crown Award - Columbia Scholastic Press Association (CSPA)
- 2012: Gold Medalist - CSPA
- 2012: 12 Gold Circle Awards - CSPA
- 2011: 22 Gold Circle Awards - CSPA
- 2011: Bronze Medalist - CSPA
- 2008: 2 Gold Circle Awards - CSPA
- 2007: 7 Gold Circle Awards - CSPA
- 2005: 2 Gold Circle Awards - CSPA
- 2004: Silver Medalist - CSPA
- 2002: 12 Gold Circle Awards - CSPA
- 2001: Pacemaker Finalist - National Scholastic Press Association/Associated Collegiate Press (ACP)
- 2001: 10 Gold Circle Awards - CSPA
- 2001: Gold Crown Award - CSPA
- 2000: 4 Gold Circle Awards - CSPA
- 2000: Silver Crown Award - CSPA
- 1999: 2 Gold Circle Awards - CSPA
- 1999: Silver Crown Award - CSPA
- 1998: Diversity Award - College Media Advisers (CMA)
- 1998: Gold Crown Award - CSPA
- 1998: Gold Medalist Award - CSPA
- 1997: 10 Gold Circle Awards - CSPA
- 1997: Gold Crown Award - CSPA
- 1996: Pacemaker Finalist - ACP
- 1996: Silver Crown Award - CSPA
- 1995: Pacemaker Finalist - ACP
- 1994: Pacemaker Finalist - ACP
- 1993: Pacemaker Finalist - ACP
