= Women's Little 500 =

Bicycle race in Indiana, United States

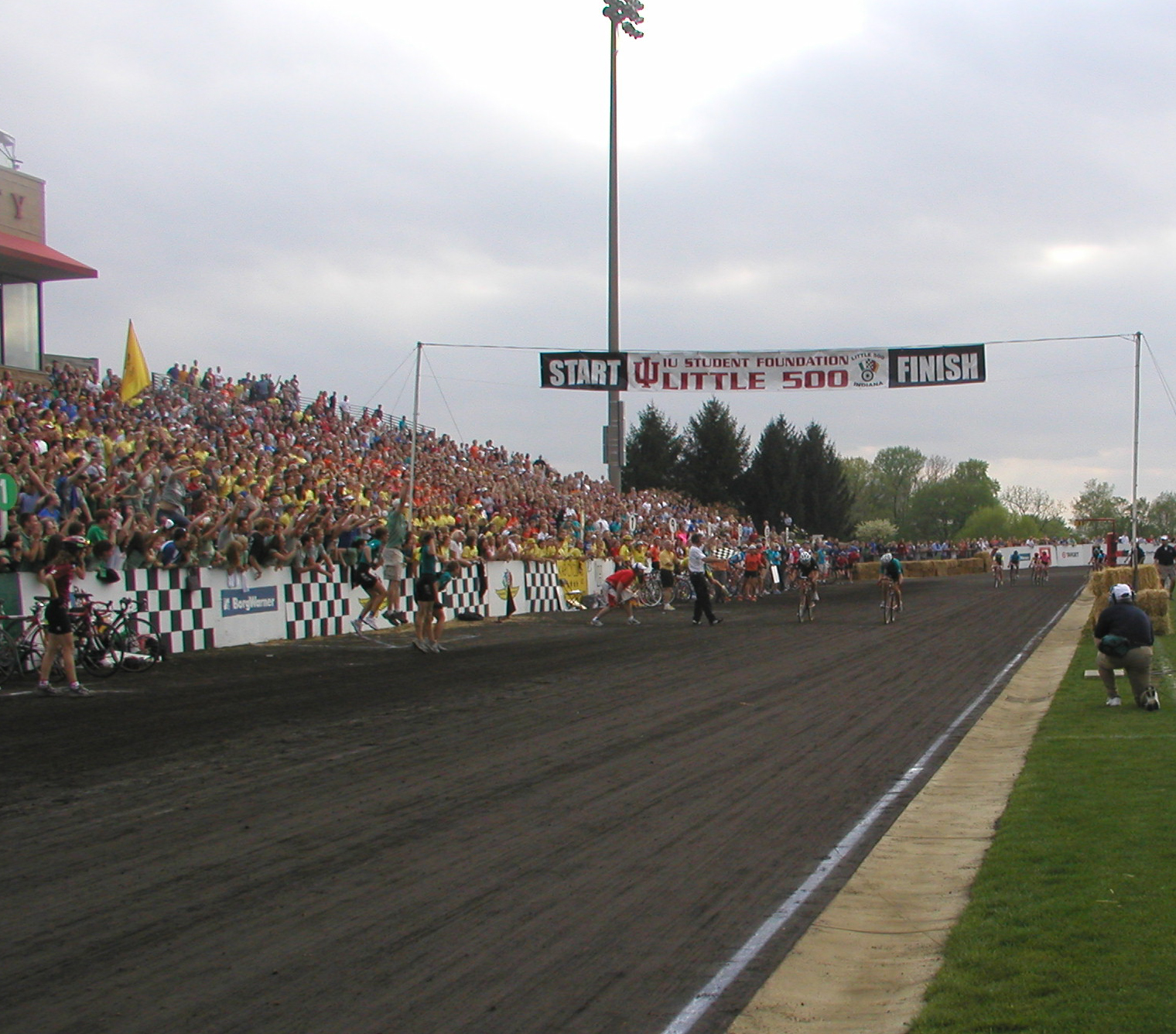
Near photo finish at the 2004 Women's Little 500. The rider on the right in the green jersey won, and her team can be seen celebrating from their pit on the left

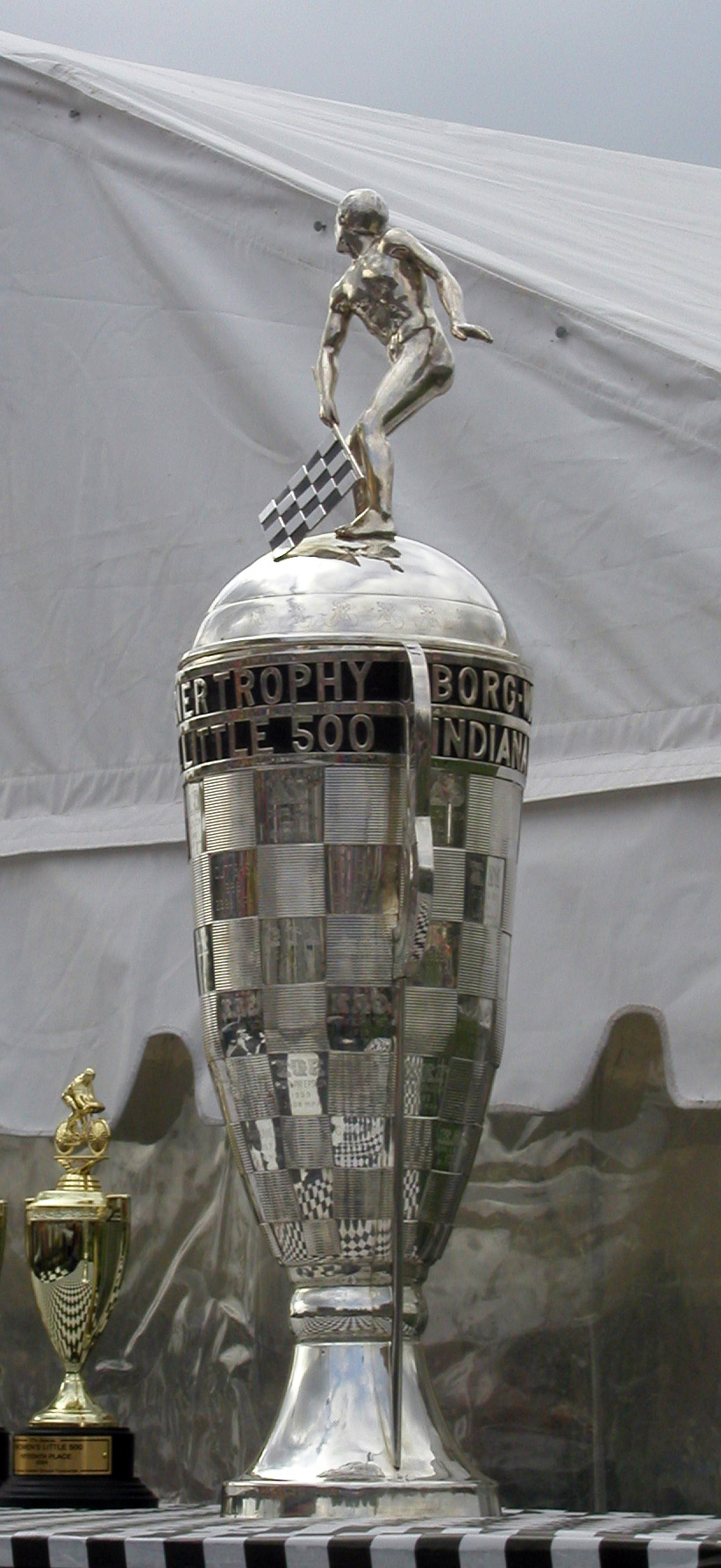
The BorgWarner Trophy, awarded to the top team

The Women's Little 500 is a bicycle race held annually at Bill Armstrong Stadium on the campus of Indiana University Bloomington. The race is modelled after the men's Little 500. The race has been run the Friday before the men's race, since its conception in 1987. It consists of half the distance of the men's race: 100 laps (25.49 miles) around the quarter-mile cinder track (410-meters) at the Bill Armstrong Stadium. Racers usually compete in teams of four, but teams can be as few as two, as long as that was the number of team members with which they qualified for the race. These teams usually have a common bond such as living in the same residence hall or being members of the same sorority, or they simply are an independent group with common interests. Each team is only given two bikes on which to ride and therefore, must compete in a relay-style that is rare in other races.

== The Purpose ==
Money raised by the event goes towards a scholarship fund for working IU students, and the race is a major social event on campus during the spring. The Women's race is just one of the several expansions added to the Men's Little 500 in order to create a week of celebration. Other events are the annual Little 50, a 50 lap running relay race and Alumni Races, which are held every 5 years. Other student celebrations during the weekend of the race have helped earn it the title of "The World's Greatest College Weekend," and it is known to be the busiest weekend of the year for the local police force. No longer seven-time Tour de France champion Lance Armstrong called the Little 500, which has raised more than $1 million in scholarship money, "the coolest event I ever attended."

== History ==
The inaugural Women's Little 500 was held in 1988, in response to 4 members of the Kappa Alpha Theta sorority narrowly failing to qualify for the 1987 men's event on their 3rd and final attempt. In the fall of 1987 two of the Theta riders considered either a second attempt to enter the men's race in 1988 or starting a women's Little 500, and they chose the latter. These women Leeann (Guzek) Terhune and Martha (Hinkamp) Gillum found a receptive Indiana University Student Foundation (the organization that conducts the race), who along with Phyllis Klotman, dean of Indiana University Office of Women's Affairs, agreed to support their effort.

While the support was crucial, the task of gathering 33 teams fell to Leeann and Martha, who spent any spare time meeting with potential women riders. In the end they were going to have 31 teams at the first Women's Little 500 Qualifications, an extraordinary accomplishment. The winner of the first Women's Little 500 was Willkie Sprint, a team of four freshmen including Kirsten Swanson, Louise Elder, Amy (Tucker) Dixon, and Kerry Hellmuth. Hailing from Willkie quadrangle dormitory, they were coached by fellow student Kevin Wentz who was assisted on race day by a fifth teammate Kristin McArdle. Their win and the efforts of Hinkamp, Guzek, and Klotman were chronicled in an article in The New York Times published the day after the first women's race was successfully run and garnered a crowd of 15,000. In 2024, Indiana University Press published “Willkie Sprint: A Story of Friendship, Love, and Winning the First Women's Little 500 Race,” in which Kerry Hellmuth tells the entertaining true story of that first race.

== Eligibility ==
1. All students desiring to participate as a rider in the Little 500 must be a full-time undergraduate student enrolled at the Bloomington campus of Indiana University during the fall and spring semesters of the year of participation.

2. Have a cumulative GPA of 2.00 or better

3. Students may only compete up to four times in a five-year period.

4. Students must be an amateur.

5. No substance abuse of any type is tolerated. If caught, you will not only have to deal with the consequences imposed by the university, but your team will also forfeit their eligibility in the race.

6. For a team to be eligible, at least one member must attend all race information meetings and turn in the final four cards with the names of the team's riders for that year. Also, all riders wishing to compete must complete their "rookie requirements." (These requirements will be discussed later.)

== Rules ==
When doing the race, there are of course a few rules.

1. All riders must use the official Little 500 bike that is provided to them for that year. There can be no toe clips or grips, kick stands, water bottles, air pumps, untaped or unplugged handlebars, or any other add-on accessories.
2. For the safety of all riders, hard helmets must be worn and buckled at all times, as well as cycling gloves.
3. Each team is required to complete 5 exchanges during the course of the race.
4. At the 98th lap, all riders not on the lead lap will be asked to move to the back or exit the pack. This is done so that teams on their last 2 laps can make their attempt to win the race. Teams which do not comply with this rule are believed to be impeding the progress of another rider and will be given a 5- to 20-second penalty or even disqualification depending on the severity of the violation.

== The Bike ==
Little 500 bikes are rather distinctive. They are single gear, coaster brake racing bicycles. There are two different versions of the bike: the men's and the women's. The only difference between the men's and women's bikes is the frame size; the men race on a 56 cm frame, while the women's bikes are built on 54 cm frames. Men and women race on the same 46x18 gearing. Every year a new version of the bike is made and then two are given to each team. The cost of the bikes are, for the most part, covered in the team registration fees and race sponsorship money. At the end of the season, team's are given the option to keep their bikes or to sell them back to IUSF. The used bikes are then kept at the track and are rented out by those teams that do not have old bikes.

== The Exchange ==
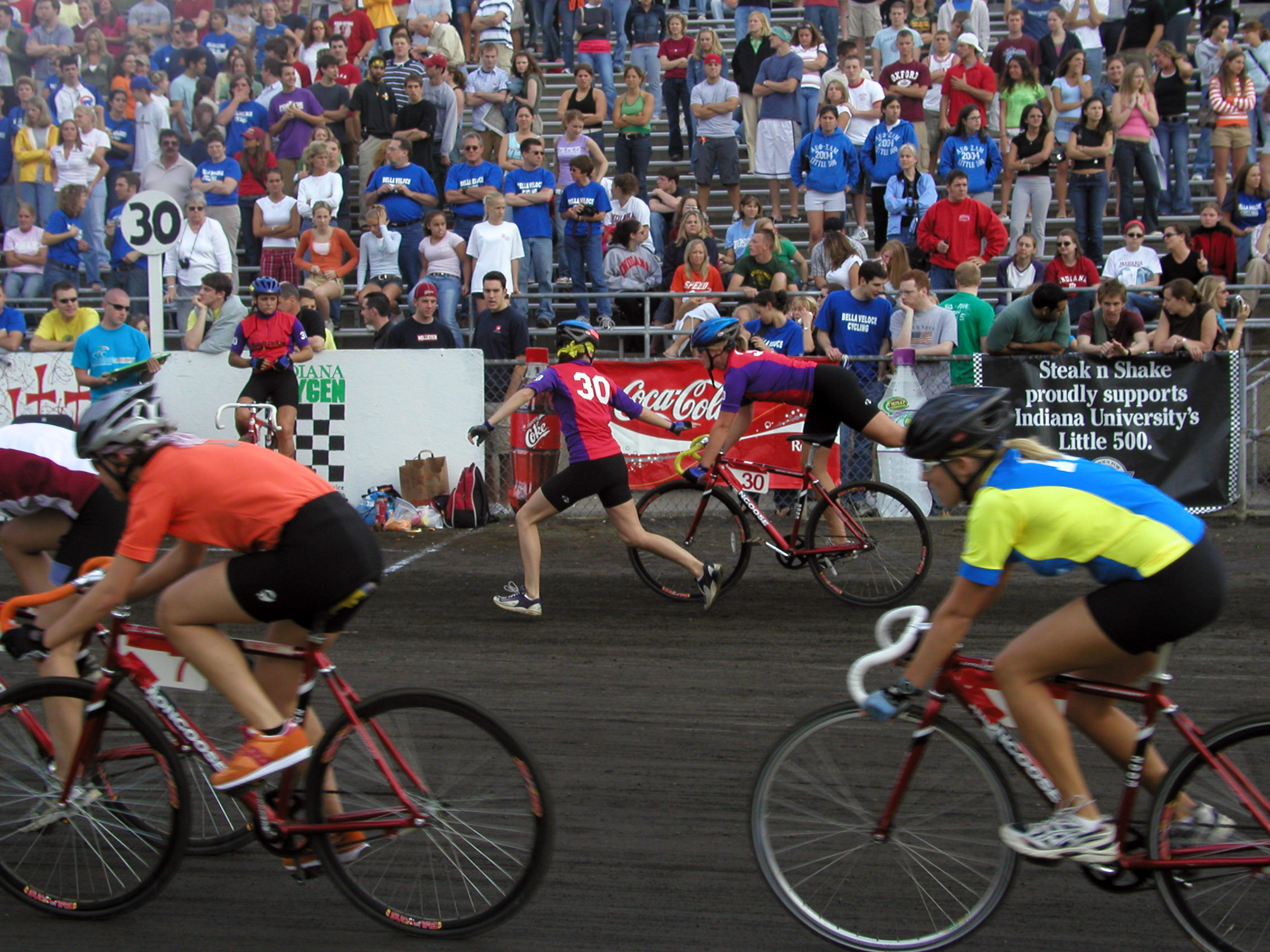
Rider exchange at the 2004 Women's Little 500. Teams must make several exchanges during the race.

This is one of the things that really make the race interesting. Because each team only has two bikes and four members, each member must perform at least one exchange during the course of the race. Though there are several different variations, there are two different types of exchanges.

=== Man-to-Man ===
The first and most common type is a man-to-man exchange. There are two styles of man-to-man exchange: "dismount to mount" and the "ghost rider."

==== Dismount-to-mount ====
To perform the "dismount to mount" exchange, the first rider must exit the pack and coast for about 15 meters in order to slow down. Then the rider on the bike will soft pedal until the right foot is back and level with the left foot in the front. Once the feet are set, the rider will then forcefully pedal backwards. Because the Little 500 Bikes are coaster brakes, this action causes the bike's wheels to stop dead and forces the bike to skid along the cinder track. During this skid, the rider on the bike will take her left foot off the pedal and swing it over to the right side. Then the left foot will come behind the right and hit the ground, soon followed by the right foot. This rider will still be running once off the bike and hand it off to the next rider. This is where many riders differ. Some mount the bike by crossing their left foot over and stepping on the left petal and then swinging their right foot over the bike. But more commonly, riders will run and then literally jump onto the bike seat. Both types have their advantages. The step on style can be very slow (if performed incorrectly) and impossible to perform if the pedals are not set properly by the first rider. But it is far less painful for the rider and much more reliable. On the other hand, jumping on the bike guarantees that the rider will get on the bike, and, when performed correctly, is faster than stepping on, but it can be very painful for most riders and often the initial shock of landing causes a momentary delay before the rider starts to get up to speed. This delay can cost crucial seconds when it comes to catching the pack. Also, for men there is the possibility of permanent damage to their reproductive organs. And many women suffer from vaginal bruising. Jumping on is also more dangerous because if performed improperly, riders are likely to take very hard falls.

==== Ghost Rider ====
The other style, the "ghost rider," when performed correctly, can be faster than the "dismount to mount" style, but has the tendency to be more dangerous, which is one of the reasons why it is no longer taught to rookies during rookie week. In order to perform the exchange the rider goes through all the same steps as in the "dismount to mount" exchange, except, instead of stepping off the bike, the rider sets the handlebars and then grabs hold of the seat. Once set, the rider will push herself off the back of the bike while it is still moving. As long as the handle bars stay in line and the rider clears the back wheel, then the bike will keep going straight on its own until the other rider grabs hold and jumps on. The name "ghost rider" comes from the fact that when the first rider gets off, the bike keeps going as if someone were really still on it, like a ghost. There are several risks to this exchange. The first is if the first rider doesn't set the handle bars properly, then when she lets go, the bike will swerve and the rider will be thrown from the bike, and possibly take out other members of hers or other teams. Any rider performing this exchange must also be careful to clear the back wheel of the bike or else face the inevitable injuries associated with this type of accident. Another risk is that the second rider can miss the bike and it will cut into other teams exchanges or even worse, race traffic. In the women's race, the only team to consistently use this technique is Kappa Alpha Theta.

=== Bike-to-Bike ===
The other type of exchange is known as a bike-to-bike exchange. The only reason that a team would use this type of exchange is if the team members are not all approximately the same height. More often than not, it is because one member of the team is shorter than the rest because most cyclists in the race are fairly tall. This exchange is far simpler than the other. The first rider only has to come in and tap the next rider's shoulder or arm and then the other racer can begin. While this is much easier than the other exchange, it is significantly slower because the second racer is starting from a dead stop, while riders performing the man-to-man exchange have some forward momentum.

To make things a little more interesting, each team, no matter what type of exchange they are doing, has to perform their exchange in the distance of two pits. The action of slowing is not part of the exchange, but the first rider is not allowed to begin getting off the bike until one pit ahead of their team's and the second rider must have complete control of the bike by the end of the team's pit. For bike-to-bike exchanges, the second person CANNOT move until tagged by the first person and the first person MUST stop before end of her team's pit. Failure to do either of these things will result in a penalty for the team.

== Series Events ==
The Little 500 is much more than just the race. There are also several series events associated with the race. These events are held for a few reasons. The first and foremost is for fun. The second reason is so that teams can scout out the competition and get a feel for that year's race field. And the final reason is so that all the members of a team, not just those competing in the actual race itself, can still participate and compete. There are four other series events outside of the race: Qualifications, ITTs, Miss-N-Out, and Team Pursuit.

=== Qualifications ===
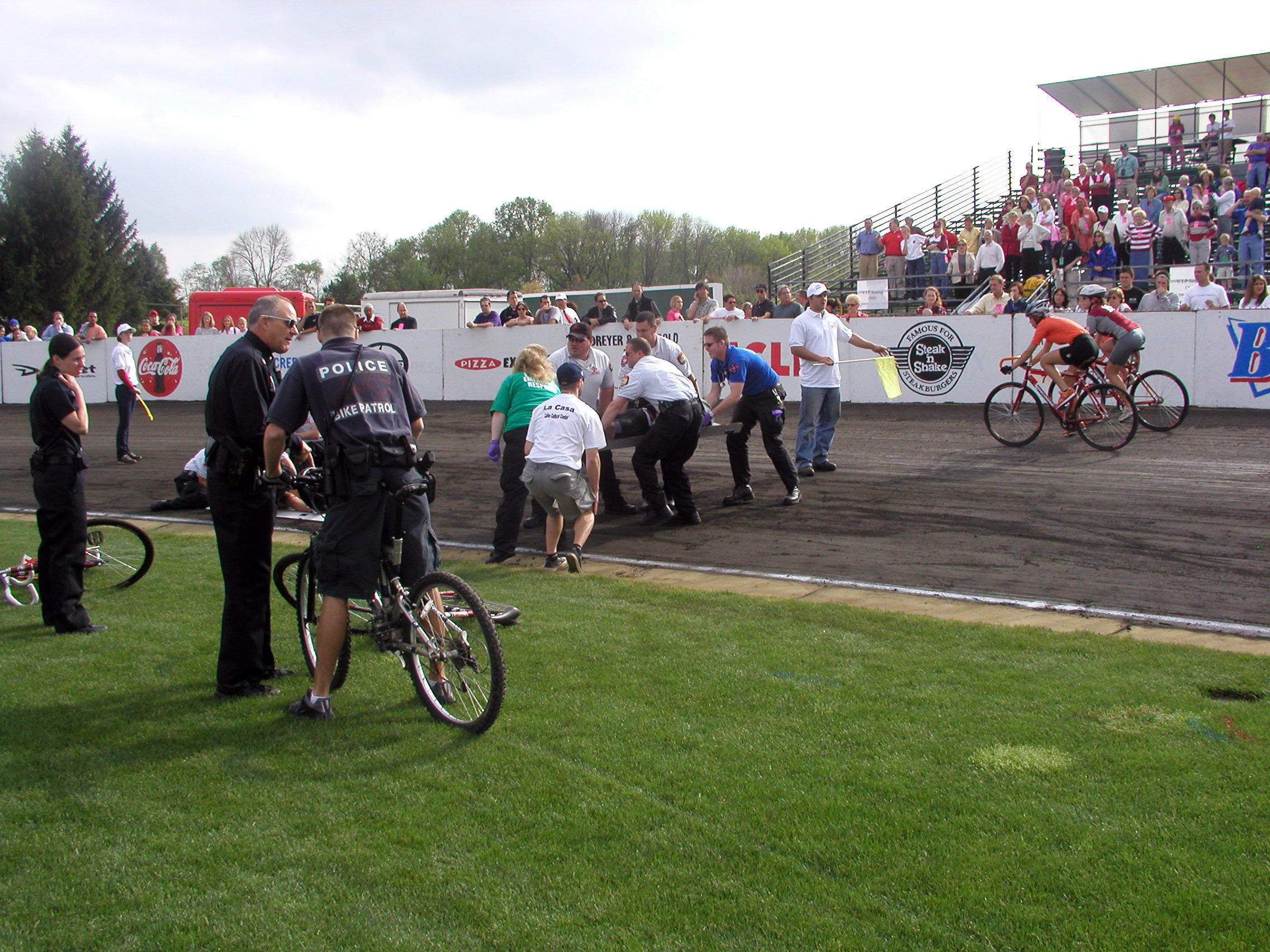
Two riders hurt in a severe crash are tended to by medical personnel during the 2004 Women's Little 500. Much of the lead-up to the actual race helps to educate riders on safe riding during the race. Nevertheless, accidents occur.

Qualifications, commonly known as "Quals," is the first and one of the most important series events. Qualifications is a four lap race around the track to see which team can get the fastest cumulative time. These times determine if a team qualifies to race in Little 500 and if so, then where in the field of the top 33 teams they will be placed. Each team is given three attempts to qualify. The reason for this is in case a team faults an exchange, then they still have two more chances to qualify. The way that a team can fault an exchange is if one of its members falls and takes the bike down with her, or the team does not perform the exchange in the given distance, which is marked by white lines on the track. Or, in the case of a bike-to-bike exchange, if the second rider starts to move before she is tagged or if the first rider does not stop the bike before the last white line. Teams can use as many as four riders or as few as two riders. But whatever number of riders a team uses to qualify is the fewest riders they can use for Little 500. Meaning that if a team qualifies with four people, then they must race with four people. But if they qualify using only three people, then they can use three or four people on the day of Little 500.

According to the Indiana University Student Foundation website, "Qualifications day is often regarded as the most stressful day on the track, as only the fastest 33 teams will be allowed to enter the Little 500. Smooth bike exchanges and quick single lap speed are the marks of a successful qualification. (not scored in overall series standings)"

=== ITTs ===
Individual Time Trials, known as ITTs, share some aspects with qualifications; both are four-lap (approximately 1 mile) sprints around the track, but individual time trials are performed individually. No more than four riders participate simultaneously in this test of both speed and sprint endurance. At the beginning of the trial, one rider is placed at each turn of the track, lined up with the start/finish line. Officials hold the bicycles in place until the starting signal is given, after which the riders accelerate from a complete stop and race around the track. It is possible to catch other riders on the track while racing, but drafting is prohibited — a rider caught drafting off another rider is automatically disqualified. Riders often measure their own abilities against others in time trials, and the overall fastest time wins the event.

=== Miss-N-Out ===
The Miss-N-Out event consists of heats of 5–8 riders, depending on the number of participants. Riders are seeded based on the individual time trial (ITT) results and are positioned along the starting line from fastest (inside) to slowest (outside). Riders are given one lap to establish position and build speed before the race begins.

Once underway, riders complete laps of the track, and at the conclusion of each lap, the last rider to cross the start/finish line is eliminated and must exit the track. This process continues until three riders remain who then advance to the next round. The format progresses through multiple heats until the final round.

In the final heat, riders continue the elimination process until three remain, at which point they complete a final sprint lap to determine first-second-, and third-place finishers based on the order in which they cross the line.

The event emphasizes tactical positioning, pacing, and endurance, as well as sprinting ability.

The IUSF website describes the event as, "An exercise in pack riding and a test in tactics. Sometimes described as "musical chairs on a bike," Miss-N-Out is the most popular spectator series event."

=== Team Pursuit ===
As the final event in the series, this event is geared more towards the team rather than the individual: team pursuit tests team strength and unity. This event starts out with two teams of three or four standing on opposite sides of the infield while their bikes lay spaced out on the track much like the starting positions for track runners. As the starting gun sounds the riders run to their bikes and begin their chase. From there, riders must race around the track in a pace line for 12 laps (approximately 3 miles) trying to catch the other team. Each team can have only one person drop out of the pace line during the course of the race. Meaning that only three team members need to finish. The fastest two times of the preliminary heats square off against each other in the final, which determines the event champions. This race is a good test to see which is the best team all around. In order to do well in this event, teams must have good communication skills as well as good drafting skills. This event really proves the cliché that "you're only as fast as your slowest rider."

== Rookie Requirements ==
In order to ensure the safety of all riders, each rider participating in any of the series events, particularly the Little 500, MUST complete their rookie requirements. These requirements include the following:

=== Rookie Week ===
This ten-day process, known as "Rookie Week," is usually held in the last couple weeks of February. It is this week in which riders go through a literal "crash" course in bike and track basics. Every day, Monday through Friday, there are two hours and fifteen minute track times held separately for men and women. Rookies must be present for 100% of the time for which they are available. (For the most part, the only accepted excuses are school and health related.) Rookies that do not comply with this, earn their team a two-second penalty on race day. During the ten days, Rookies are trained by members of the Rider's Council on how to ride in packs, ride in pacelines, draft, mount and dismount, and how to perform full exchanges. At the end "Rookie Week" all rookies are tested to be sure that they are able to demonstrate all the necessary skills that one needs to be a safe and successful rider.

=== Rookie Hours ===
Once Rookie week is complete, rookies must still attend track times for at least 75% of their availability up until the Wednesday during the week of the race. Again, riders whom do not comply with this will earn their team a two-second penalty. This is to ensure that all riders are still practicing and so that the rookies can get used to sharing the track with the veteran riders.

== Rider's Council ==
This is a subcommittee of IUSF. It is a group of experienced Little 500 riders. Their purpose is to act as a liaison between rookies and veteran riders and race officials. The biggest role they play is during Rookie Week when they teach the basics of how to ride in the Little 500.

== Student Coaches: Rule Change ==
=== The Debate ===
Until the month before the 2007 race, there was much debate over a recent change in the Little 500 rules. While it has been a long-standing tradition in the race that teams have alumni riders coach them, IUSF decided to introduce a new mandatory system of coaching: the student coach. The idea behind it was twofold. One was to involve more students in the race to make it more like the original race before alumni riders existed, and another was to help give independent teams a better chance of success in the race. While both of these goals were both valid and likely needed, the rule change caused many problems. The first problem was that it was difficult for teams to find students that were interested in being a student coach. Secondly, the new rule was going to prohibit alumni coaches from being in their respective team's pit on race day. Both of these caused a great deal of controversy, to the point that some teams were threatening to boycott the race. In the end, some form of a compromise was reached: every team had a student coach, and on race day the alumni coaches were allowed to be in the pit. While it all turned out probably for the best, this rule change did change the race. There were teams that lost their alumni coaches due to this. And it is believed that this rule change is one of the reasons why the women's race did not have a full field in 2007.

=== The Rule ===
The Student coaches, much like the riders must fulfill certain requirements before they can be eligible.

1. must be a full-time undergraduate student enrolled at the main campus of Indiana University during the fall and spring semesters of the year of participation.
2. must have a cumulative GPA of 2.00 or better
3. 1. Complete one of the following

a. R100 - LEADERSHIP DEVELOPMENT IN CYCLING COACHING Fall 2006 2nd 8 weeks
Or
b. R100 - LEADERSHIP DEVELOPMENT IN CYCLING COACHING Spring 2007 1st 8 weeks (see Below)
Or
c. Little 500 Leadership Development in Cycling Coaching Seminar (One seven-hour seminar)
Or
d. Little 500 Leadership Development in Cycling Coaching Seminar (Seven one-hour seminars)

2. Attend 2nd semester Team Captain meetings that cover the following topics:
a. Spring Series Events Team Captain Meeting
b. Pre Spring Break Team Captain Meeting
c. Pre Race Team Captain Meeting

3. Student Coaches who have never ridden in the IUSF Little 500 must attend one of the following: a. Two day race readiness clinic ::offered Or b. Two day race readiness clinic offered

4. No substance abuse of any type is tolerated. If caught, the student will not only have to deal with the consequences imposed by the university, but the team will also forfeit its eligibility in the race.
5. For a team to be eligible, the coach or at least one of the riders must attend all race information meetings and turn in the final four cards with the names of the team's riders for that year.
6. The student coach CAN be a rider.

== In popular media ==
The 2027 film titled Little Five, directed by Ian Samuels, follows four young women in the early 1980s who come together to compete in the Little 500 race.

== See also ==
- Athletics at Indiana University Bloomington
- Mini 500
- Little 500
