= Black Market firebombing =

Firebombing

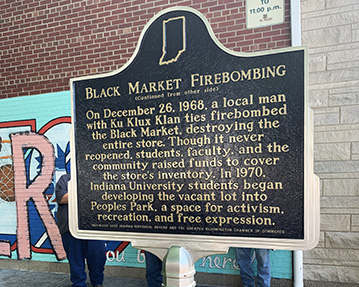
- Location: Indiana University Bloomington
- Date: December 26th, 1968
- Attack type: firebombing
- Weapon: Molotov Cocktail
- Perpetrators: Carlisle Briscoe and Jackie Dale Kinser

On December 26, 1968, Indiana University's Black Market, a student run shopping center for Black made items and clothing, was firebombed by two Ku Klux Klan members just three months after its opening. The market's founder, student Clarence "Rollo" Turner, spearheaded protests against racial discrimination at the university, including the ones that followed the market's firebombing.

== Background ==
The Black Market was started on the IU Bloomington campus at the corner of Dunn Street and Kirkwood Avenue in September 1968 by graduate student Clarence "Rollo" Turner. At the time, the student population at IU Bloomington only included about 2% Black students, of which Turner was one of the few to lead protests for change in the community. In the 1968 Little 500, Turner was a part of a sit-in which protested against discrimination in campus fraternity covenants. Turner also co-founded the Afro-Afro-American Student Association at IU Bloomington the spring before the Black Market opened in 1968.

The market was made possible through students and faculty who invested in the new business. Goods sold at the market included clothing, jewelry, literature, artwork, and music records that were associated with Black culture. Along with providing the local community with a center for Black made items, the Black Market was also considered to be a hub for culture and the exchange of ideas. Ted Najam, the president of the Student Body at the time, was quoted in an article by the Indiana Daily Student stating that the Black Market was a contributor to the campus community's intellectual and social life. While the Black Market was still operational it was reported to have experienced incidents involving harassment from white customers, including racially motivated bomb threats that were called in to the building's owner Larry Canada.

In March 1968, the Ku Klux Klan (KKK) chapter of Morgan County, Indiana planned to run a membership drive at the Bloomington courthouse square in an attempt to expand into the Monroe County area. The event was ultimately shut down by local government officials who believed that the gathering of KKK members in the city would likely lead to violence. The following summer a KKK Grand Dragon was invited by an IU group to have a debate on the Bloomington campus. Students opposed to having KKK members on campus advertising their organization to the student body petitioned for the invitation to be rescinded by IU president Elvis Stahr. The debate was eventually "postponed" by Stahr, however, there is no record as to whether the event had ever been rescheduled.

== Incident ==
The morning after Christmas in 1968, while most student were away from campus on break, a man was seen tossing a Molotov cocktail through the Black Market's window. According to the Spectator, an underground newspaper that circulated the IU campus at the time, witnesses reported that the firebomber was a dark-haired white male who appeared to be around 5'8" and 160 pounds. The market and all of its goods were destroyed in the fire. While the building was insured, the items that resided in the market at the time of the bombing had not been thus culminating into thousands of dollars of lost revenue.

== Aftermath ==
On Saturday January 4, 1969, a group of IU Bloomington faculty, local residence, and the Bloomington Civil Liberties Union gathered at a YMCA office to discuss the firebombing. The meeting concluded with the decision to set up two funds: one for information from the public on the individual who committed the crime and one to pay for the market's lost revenue. The following Tuesday the Office of Afro-American Affairs had their own meeting in which they discussed how they planned to carry on after the market's destruction. The students at this meeting made the decision to hold a rally outside the burned down store on January 11, 1969, in order to air out their grievances. At the rally, with over 200 students in attendance, Clarence "Rollo" Turner made a statement calling out IU Bloomington and the local government. Turner also made a point to state that the purpose of the rally was to present "the black perspective".

Due to Turner's plan to leave the state in the summer of 1969, fundraising after the Black Market Firebombing was focused on paying back students and investors rather than funding a reopening of the business. According an Indianapolis Star article from January 26, 1969, the Black Market reached its goal of $2,500 the week prior to the article's publishing. Funding for this goal came from various student organizations, the American Association of University Professors, and the Mrs. Seaman's Sound Band, who contributed their proceeds from a dance.

On Monday September 15, 1969, Carlisle Briscoe plead guilty to the firebombing of the Black Market and named Jackie Dale Kinser as his getaway driver. According to Monroe County Prosecutor Thomas M. Berry, both men were members of the Ku Klux Klan. Briscoe was sentenced to one to ten years in prison and ended up serving roughly three and a half while charges against Kinser were dropped.

While the Black Market was never reopened, members of the Youth International Party in the 1970s did develop the empty space where the building once stood into a People's Park that was modeled after the People's Park at the University of Berkley. The park served as a place for community gatherings, protests, and music for the Bloomington area. While at some points in the park's early years the city considered closing it down due to health concerns, the Bloomington People's Park did eventually become legally sanctioned after the land's owner Larry Canada gave the property to the city under the condition that it would continue to be a park.
