= Mini 500 =

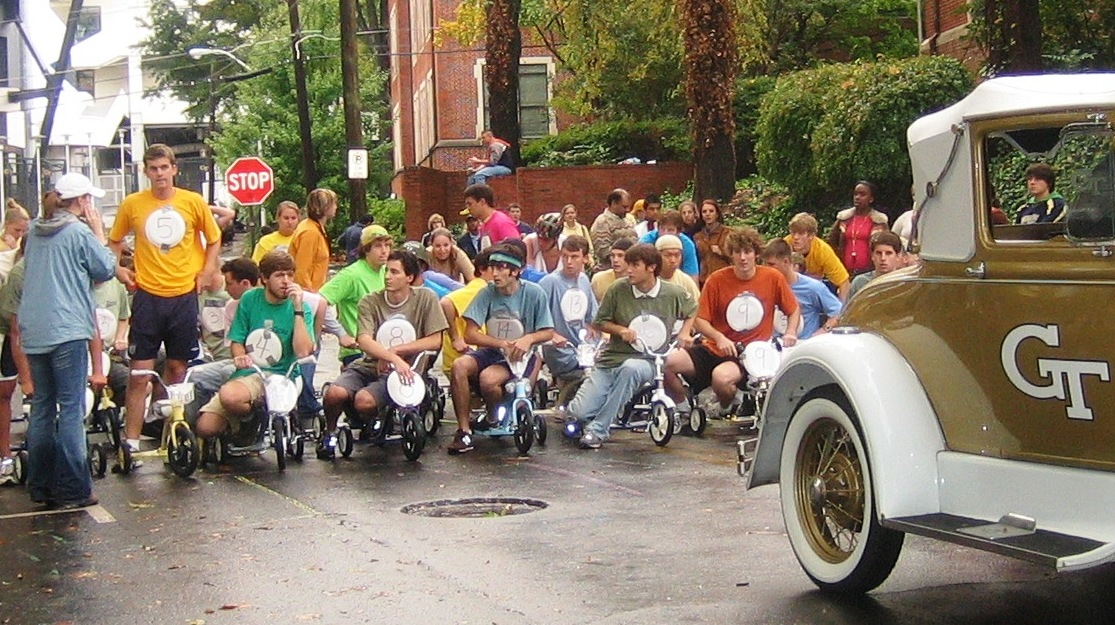
Tricyclists line up behind the Ramblin' Wreck at the start of Georgia Tech's Mini 500

Mini 500 is the name of a tricycle race performed annually at Indiana University and the Georgia Institute of Technology.

== Indiana ==
Indiana's Mini 500 began in 1955 as a means to involve women in the Little 500 celebration. The Mini 500 was exclusively for women until 1978. The modern Mini 500 is organized by the Student Foundation Special Events Steering Committee and it is held in Assembly Hall. The race featured men's, women's, and coed divisions. Trikes were specially made for the race with larger front wheels and stronger frames. Teams were composed of four riders and one optional coach.

This event was discontinued in 2002 and replaced with the Little Fifty, a relay-style footrace.

== Georgia Tech ==
In the 1960s, freshman fraternity pledges were often forced to ride tricycles around campus. Georgia Tech's Mini 500 was derived from this practice and was first organized by the Ramblin' Reck Club in 1969 and has been orchestrated during the week leading up to the homecoming football game every year since. Participating teams must complete 8 laps around Peters Parking Deck. The teams are made up of assorted fraternities, sororities, ROTC, sports clubs, and other student organizations. The teams can have up to seven members (4 drivers and 3 pit crew). As the tricyclers race, they must complete three pit stops in which the front tire is rotated. Each tire rotation and each lap is counted by a designated Ramblin' Reck Club member. The tricycles are provided by Ramblin' Reck Club but because they are made for children, an additional support bar can be welded to the frame. The toy tricycles require unique techniques and strategies for effective riding.

== Other Collegiate Trike Races ==
- Depauw University holds a Mini 500 in conjunction with its own version of the Little 500 race.
- Indiana State University has held a tricycle race known as the Indiana State Tricycle Derby annually since 1963.
- Louisiana College has held a homecoming tricycle race annually since 1997.
- Purdue University has held a tricycle race known as the Trike Race annually since 2004 as part of their Grand Alternative.

== See also ==
- Little 500 - Bicycle race based out of Indiana
- Georgia Tech traditions - Extensive list of Georgia Tech traditions
