= One Day in April =

- Film poster
- Directed by: Thomas Miller
- Written by: Peter Stevenson
- Produced by: Ryan Black, Kirsten Powell
- Starring: Jordan Bailey, Kaycee Doogs, Kevin Depasse, Courtney Bishop, Lisa Hutcheson, Zach Osterman
- Cinematography: Ryan Black
- Edited by: Thomas Miller
- Music by: Brandon Hickey
- Distributed by: Life is My Movie Entertainment
- Release date: April 24, 2015
- Running time: 90 minutes
- Country: United States
- Language: English

One Day in April is a 2015 feature-length documentary produced by Life Is My Movie Entertainment. The film follows four teams of college cyclists as they prepare for the Indiana University Little 500, a collegiate bicycle race held each year in Bloomington, Indiana.

The film premiered on April 24, 2015.

== Synopsis ==
One Day in April is an intimate look at what goes on in the months leading up to a big college cycling race like Bloomington Indiana's "Little 500." The film stars two teams of cyclists, a women's and a men's team, as well as their coaches, families, and friends who support them through the ups and downs of training for the race. One Day in April also goes behind the scenes to show the organizers of the event and what goes into creating and maintaining the integrity of a non-profit organization.

== Reception ==
The film received positive reviews from cyclists, alumni, and critics. "Her Campus" wrote; "This movie is an ode to IU, the Little 500 race and the Midwest itself."

== See also ==
- Breaking Away
- Indiana University
- Little 500
