= Ramblin' Wreck =

One of two official mascots of the Georgia Institute of Technology

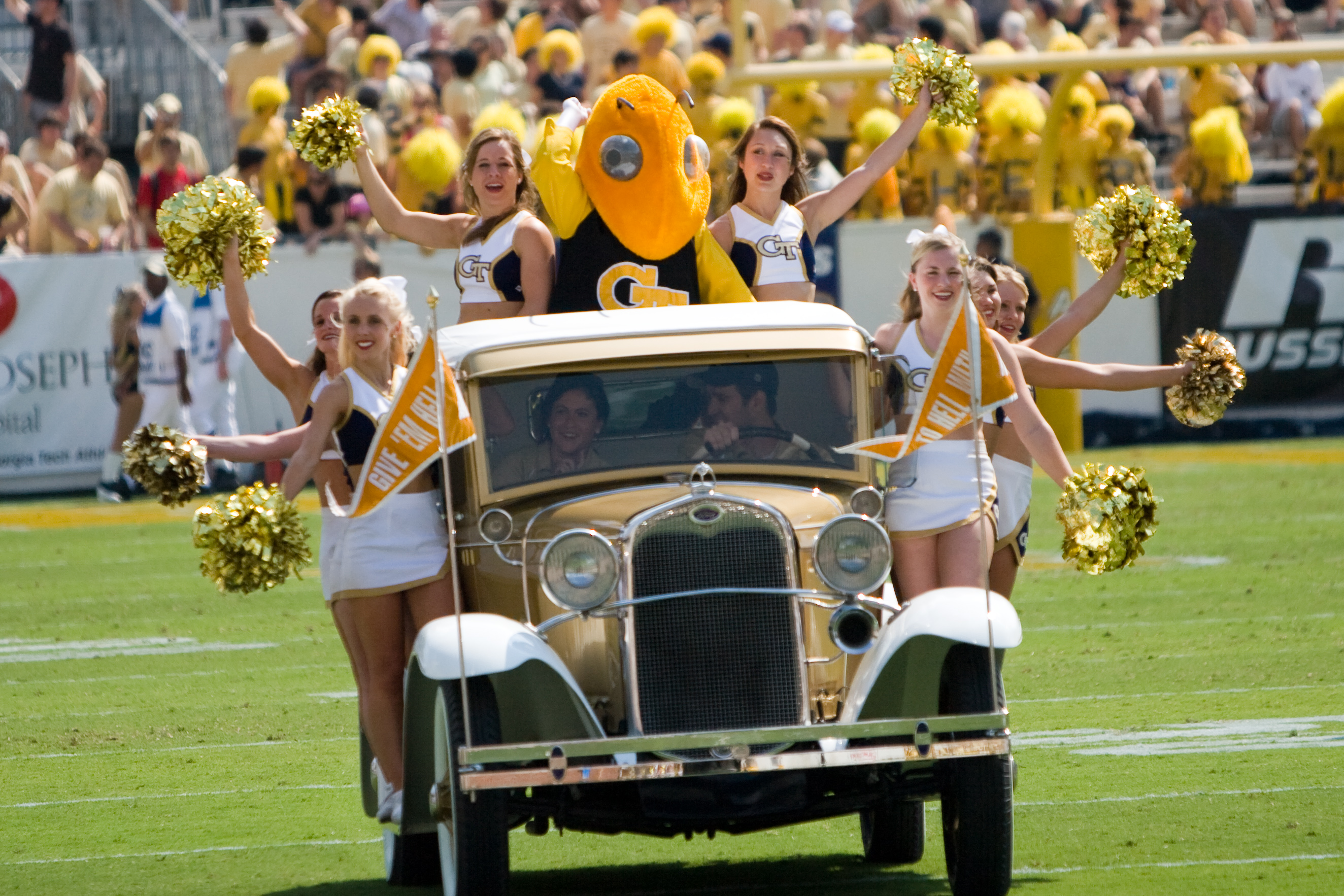
The Ramblin' Wreck with cheerleaders and Buzz at a football game against Samford in 2007

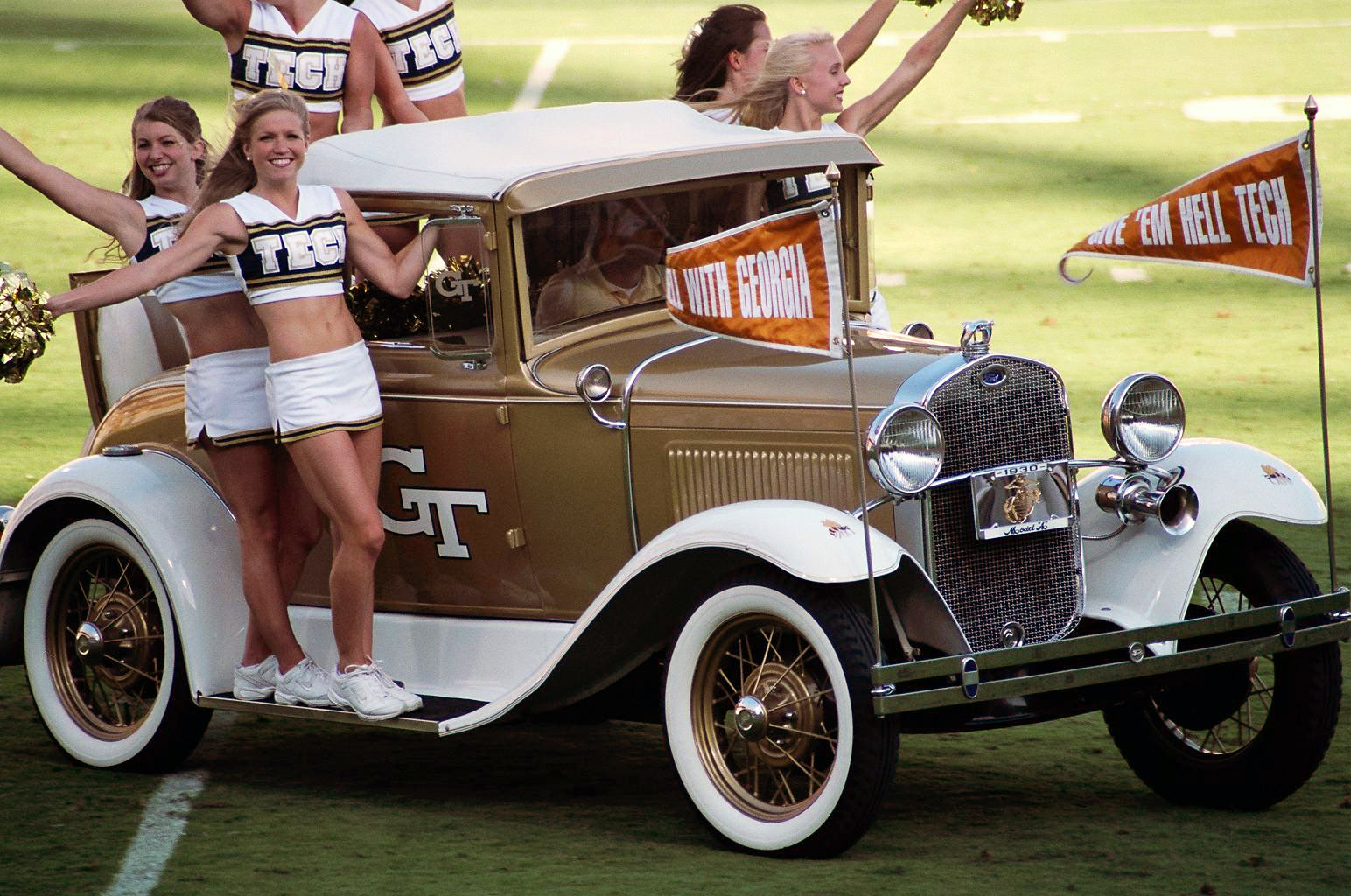
The Ramblin' Wreck leading the Yellow Jackets onto the field against Maryland in 2006

The Ramblin' Wreck from Georgia Tech is the 1930 Ford Model A Sport Coupe that serves as the official mechanical mascot of the student body at Georgia Tech. The Wreck is present at all major sporting events and student body functions. Its most noticeable role is leading the Georgia Tech Yellow Jackets football team into Bobby Dodd Stadium, a duty which the Wreck has performed since 1961. The Ramblin' Wreck is mechanically and financially maintained on campus by students in the Ramblin' Reck Club.

The first mechanical Wreck was a 1914 Ford Model T owned by Dean Floyd Field. Until the current Wreck was donated to the school in 1961, most of the early Ramblin' Wrecks were owned by students, faculty or alumni. The modern Wreck has donned a number of different paint jobs and has had several restorations and modifications made to it. These changes were made by various individuals and organizations over the years, including Bobby Dodd and Georgia Tech alumnus Pete George, who worked at the Ford plant in Hapeville, Georgia. The upkeep of the Wreck has been the sole responsibility of the Ramblin' Reck Club and the Wreck driver since 1968.

The Ramblin' Wreck has been the target of several pranks perpetrated by rival schools; the University of Tennessee once provided the Wreck with an unsolicited new paint job, and the University of Georgia has stolen the Wreck on at least two occasions. Several replica or "false" Wrecks are owned by alumni, or are used for display and do not run. The official Ramblin' Wreck is considered the only "true" Wreck, and no backups or replacements exist.

== History ==
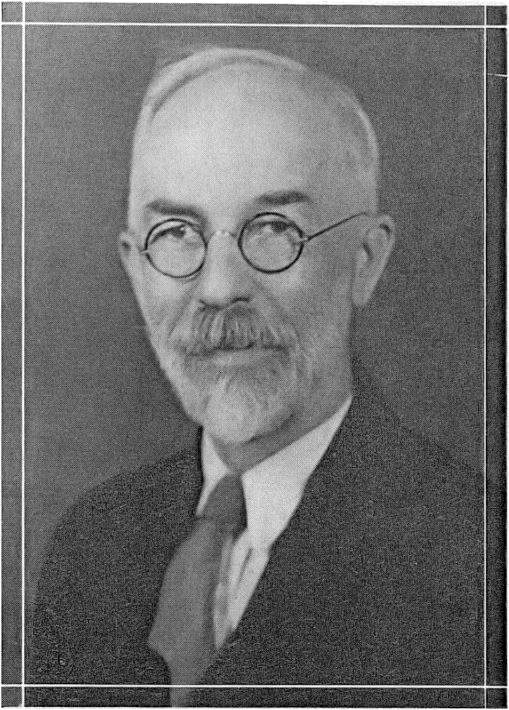
Dean Floyd "BobCat" Field, owner of the first "Ramblin' Wreck"

The term "Ramblin' Wreck" has been used to refer to students and alumni of Georgia Tech much longer than the car that now bears the name has been in existence. The expression has its origins in the late 19th century and was used originally to refer to the makeshift motorized vehicles constructed by Georgia Tech engineers employed in projects in the jungles of Central America. The Wrecks were constructed from whatever the engineers could find—mostly old tractor and automotive parts—and were kept running by the engineers' ingenuity and creativity. Other workers in the area began to refer to these vehicles and the men who drove them as "Rambling Wrecks from Georgia Tech."

The first "mechanical mascot" at Georgia Tech was a 1914 Ford Model T owned by Dean Floyd Field. Field drove the car to and from class every day from 1916 until 1928. Field cared so much for the car that he even nicknamed it "Nellie". The vehicle was distinguished by its metallic black paint job and a large black box fastened to the rear end by a wooden wheel's hoop. The black box's contents were never revealed to the student body and the box became part of the mystique of the Old Ford.

The student body initially nicknamed the vehicle "Floyd's Flivver" but eventually began to call the car the "Ramblin' 'Reck." The first mention of Field's Ford as a Ramblin' 'Reck was in 1926 when he performed an overhaul of the car's engine, body, and paint job with the help of the campus machine shop.

Dean Field found a love for travel with his Model T. He took it all the way to California for seminars on mathematics and education. However, in 1927 rumors began to abound campus that Field was going to buy a Model A. Field quelled the rumors with a personal interview in the last issue of the 1927 Technique. By September 1928, Field felt he could not travel as much with the dilapidated Model T. To the dismay of the student body the vehicle was discarded by Dean Field in 1928 and a Model A was purchased. Field's Model A lasted until 1934 in which he bought a Ford V8. He would drive over 122,000 miles (196,300 km) in all three cars during his Georgia Tech tenure of 1900–1945.

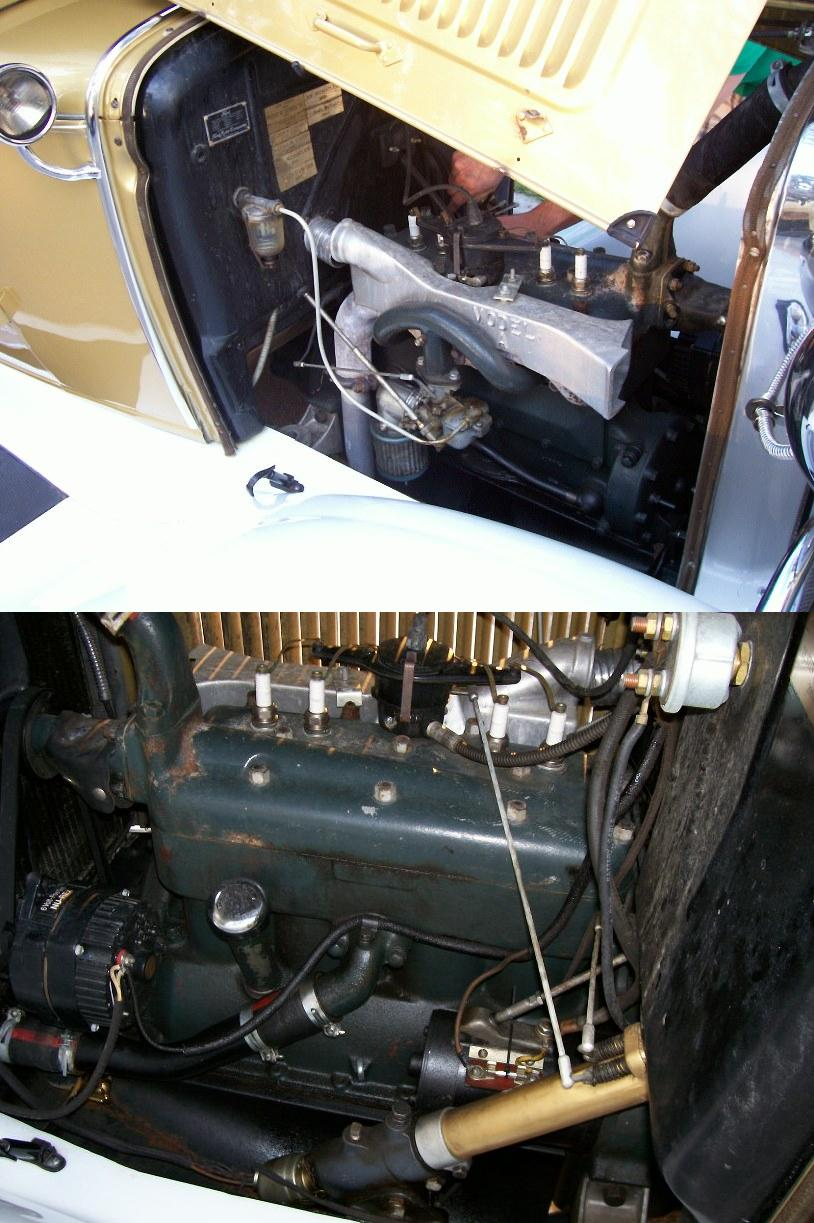
The Ramblin' Wreck engine, built in December 1929

In memoriam to his retired "Tin Lizzie", Dean Field started "an Old Ford Race" from the intersection of North Avenue and Techwood Drive in Atlanta to the intersection of Hills Street and Prince Avenue in Athens. The race was sponsored by the Technique, which nicknamed the event the "Flying Flivver Race." The finish line was facilitated by the University of Georgia student newspaper The Red and Black. The only rule of the race was that the car had to be a pre-1926 4-cylinder motor car. The fastest time in the race was achieved by an Essex which completed the 79-mile (126 km) race in 1 hour and 26 minutes or 55 mph (88 km/h).

The Tech administration disliked the perilous race and reduced the race to a more peaceful and regulated parade of contraptions known as the Ramblin' Wreck Parade after races were completed in 1929 and 1930. The Yellow Jacket Club facilitated the first official Ramblin' Wreck parade in 1932. The only break in the parade's continuous operation occurred with the onset of World War II. There were no parades from 1942 to 1943 and when the parade did continue in 1944, all Wrecks had to be human powered. In 1946, the Ramblin' Wreck Parade was allowed to operate combustion engines again. The rules instituted in the 1946 Wreck Parade still remain as the parade has become the featured event for all Tech homecomings.

=== Mascot for students ===
Dean of Student Affairs James E. Dull recognized a need for an official Ramblin' Wreck when he observed the student body's fascination with classic cars. Fraternities, in particular, would parade around their House Wrecks as displays of school spirit and enthusiasm. It was considered a rite of passage to own a broken down vehicle.

In 1960, Dull began a search for a new official symbol to represent the institute. He specifically wanted a classic pre-war Ford. Dull's search would entail newspaper ads, radio commercials, and other means to locate this vehicle. The search took him throughout the state and country, but no suitable vehicle was found until the autumn of 1960. Dean Dull spotted a polished 1930 Ford Model A outside of his apartment located in Towers Dormitory. The owner was Captain Ted J. Johnson, Atlanta's chief Delta Air Lines pilot.

Johnson had purchased the car from a junkyard in 1956. Johnson and his son, Craig, would restore the car as a father-son project while Craig attended the Georgia Military Academy. The two spent two years and over $1,800 restoring the vehicle. Johnson used spare parts from many different sources to refurbish the rusty hulk. He bought the mahogany dash from a parts dealer in Caracas, Venezuela, and used Convair 440 aluminum sheets to replace the flooring. After Craig graduated from high school, he attended Florida State on a track scholarship. In 1960, Craig's track team would be in Atlanta competing against Tech. Johnson, wanting to see his son compete, took the Model A to Tech campus, parked it near Towers dormitory, and went to watch Craig compete.

When Johnson returned to his car, he found a note from Dean Dull attached to his windshield. Dull's note offered to purchase the car to serve as Georgia Tech's official mascot. Johnson, after great deliberation, agreed to take $1,000, but eventually returned the money in 1984 so that the car would be remembered as an official donation to Georgia Tech and the Alexander-Tharpe Fund. The Ramblin' Wreck was officially transferred to the Athletic Association on May 26, 1961.

The Ramblin' Wreck was unveiled September 30, 1961, at Grant Field in front of 43,501 Tech fans, as it led the team onto the field against Rice University. The team prevailed 24–0 and the Wreck became an instant success within the Tech family. The Wreck has since led the team onto the field for every home game.

=== Bobby Dodd's restorations ===
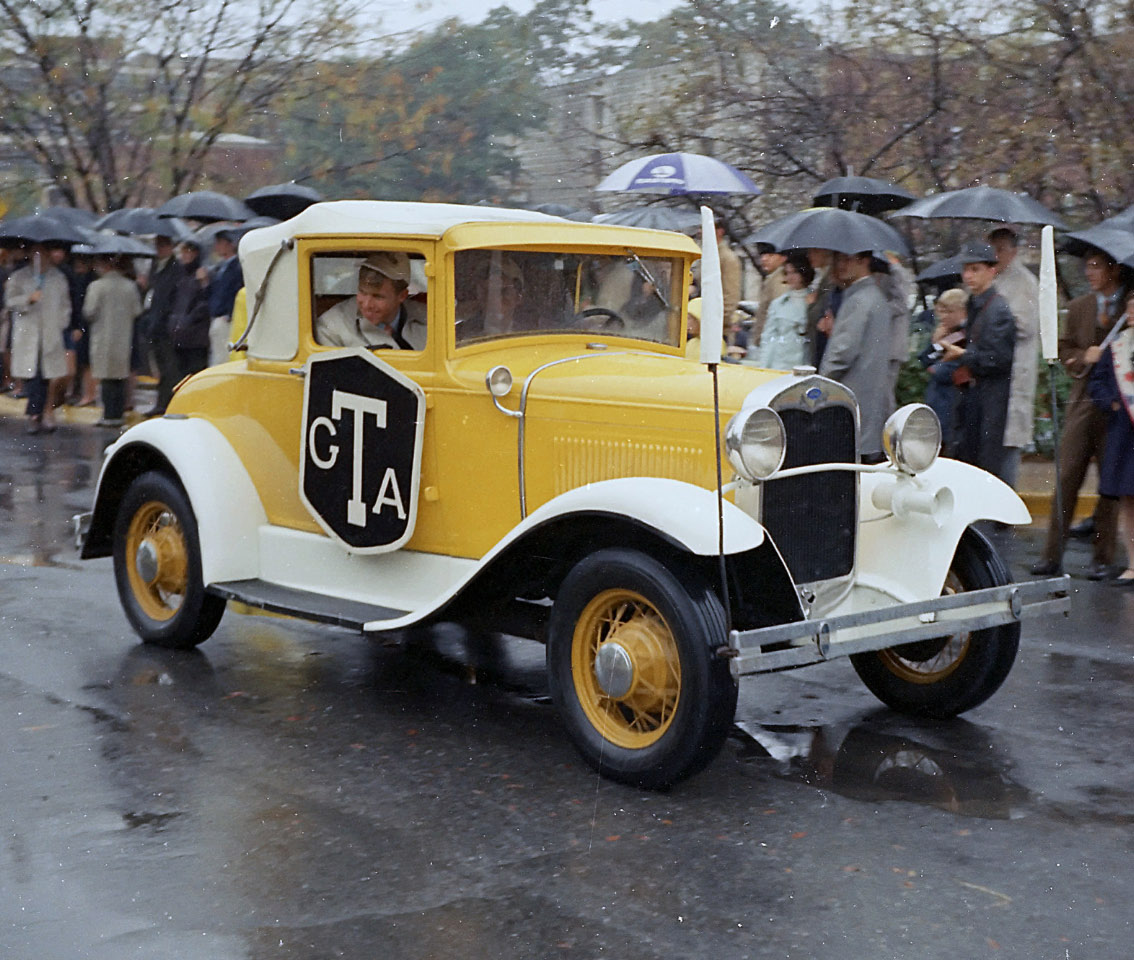
The Ramblin’ Wreck at the 1969 Tech homecoming parade shown in its original color scheme

The current color scheme was selected in 1974 by then athletic director and former head coach Bobby Dodd. The original Wreck decor featured a wooden GT shield on both the driver- and passenger-side doors. This shield was removed during Dodd's revitalization of the old Model A. Dodd chose an old gold paint from a Lincoln car paint catalogue as the base for the new color scheme. He also placed a slightly stretched GT emblem on the door, a Tech helmet on the rear quarter panel, and a 1952 version of the Yellow Jacket on the front quarter panel. According to Tech lore, Bobby Dodd was so enamored with the Lincoln gold, he changed the football helmet and uniform color to match the new Ramblin' Wreck paint scheme.

The biggest structural change was a support system attached to the car's frame. The support system runs the length of the running boards and allows the increased weight of cheerleaders or Reck Club members standing on the running boards.

=== Pete George's restorations ===
From 1973 to 1987, 1947 IE alum Pete George maintained the Ramblin' Wreck at the Hapeville Ford Plant. George would mastermind the 1974 change of colors as well as a major refurbishment of the Wreck in 1982 in time for Georgia Tech's 1985 centennial celebration. The car was completely disassembled, rebuilt, and repainted by late 1982.

There were a few noticeable changes to the Ramblin' Wreck after the 1982 refurbishment. An aftermarket chrome stone guard was added to protect the grill, the emblems on the side were removed and replaced by a basic GT decal on the doors. The 1952 Yellow Jackets were moved to the front tire wells. The white horn was chromed over. The old tire cover was a shield with a football helmet-wearing yellow jacket. This was replaced with a white generic naugahyde Ford tire cover. The blackwall tires and brakes were replaced with whitewall tires and modified brakes.

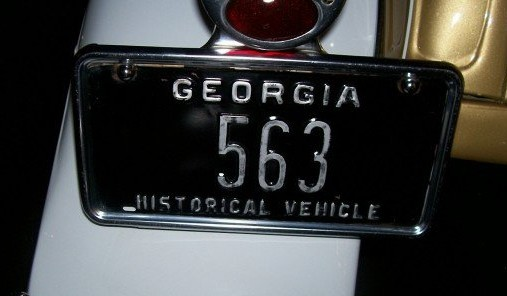
The Ramblin' Wreck license plate was issued in 1958. The Wreck is Georgia Historical Vehicle #563.

The Wreck experienced a major transition of ownership after the Centennial Celebration. Since Reck Club had financially maintained the vehicle for so long and Reck Club fell under the dean of students rather than the athletic association, the vehicle was sold from the athletic association to the institute for zero dollars in 1987. The transaction further solidified Reck Club's responsibilities over the car but also made the car more than simply a football mascot. The old Ford was officially an institute icon.

=== Post-centennial restoration and change of ownership ===
After Pete George's retirement in 1987, the upkeep of the Wreck fell directly upon the shoulders of the Wreck Drivers and Reck Club. In 1994, the Hapeville Plant ended their relationship with Reck Club. Since then, the Wreck has been student maintained with the assistance of local Atlanta garages. The Wreck has had numerous mechanical and cosmetic repairs over the years since Pete George's initial full rebuild.

After 1994, Reck Club restored the wheels and brakes to original Model A specifications. Reck Club performed a major off body restoration in the Spring of 2000 that saw the car repainted and the engine rebuilt. Pete George, although several years retired, aided Reck Club in its restoration providing funding and labor to the 2000 restoration. After the restoration, a small modification replaced the electrical generator with a more efficient Nu-Rex alternator.

=== 2007 highway accident ===
Reck Club coordinated their second major restoration following damage incurred during a highway accident on June 22, 2007, on Interstate 75 in Monroe County, about 60 miles south of Atlanta. Though trailered, the crash caused severe damage to the body and top of the Ramblin' Wreck, while the Ford Expedition and trailer in tow were both wrecked. Fourth-year Polymer, Textile, and Fiber Engineering major John Bird was driving, with his younger brother Matt, and recalled for the press:

Something in the trailer failed, and the trailer pulled us off the road going 70 miles an hour. We went perpendicular to the lanes of traffic, and we crashed into a ditch on the side of the road... There wasn’t any fishtailing... The trailer just snapped and made a 90 degree turn, and I just said ‘Matt, hold on’ and we hit the ditch. The whole thing lasted about 2 seconds... The left side is smashed up pretty good and the roof is torn up... but the motor is fine and all the wheels are fine."

— John Bird, Highway accident damages Ramblinʼ Wreck

Bird had stated that both his brother and he got whiplash from the crash, one of Matt's legs was bruised, and "it also could have been a lot worse."

=== Modern role of the Wreck ===
The Ramblin' Wreck has led the Yellow Jacket football team onto Grant Field almost 300 games. It also makes appearances for other Georgia Tech sports teams: it is often seen before big basketball games at Hank McCamish Pavilion, occasionally parked outside of Russ Chandler Stadium during warm weekend baseball series, and has attended several softball games a year at the new mid-campus stadium.

A symbol of the institute's academic and collegiate tradition, the old Model A is often dispatched to special events on campus. It is always present when new buildings are opened or dedicated. On December 5, 2006, the Wreck became the first car to drive across the new Fifth Street Bridge.

Every spring, the Institute holds a ceremony, known as When the Whistle Blows, to honor students, staff, and faculty who died during the previous year. The Georgia Tech Whistle is blown once for each person who died, and once more to salute Georgia Tech alumni and friends who may also have died. A procession of the military escort, led by the Ramblin' Wreck, leads up to the ceremony, during which the Wreck is parked next to the speaker's stage.

During Tech Homecoming, the Ramblin' Wreck has several duties. Several days before Homecoming, it acts as a giant gold starter pistol for the Mini 500 tricycle race. The Wreck's next task is to lead the racers out of the starting line in the Freshman Cake Race. On the day of the Homecoming football game, the Wreck leads the Ramblin' Wreck Parade, then leads the football team onto the field.

The car is also present at every Freshman Orientation (FASET), Earth Day festival, and other campuswide events.

A ride in the Wreck serves as a notable experience for many retiring faculty and staff. Kim King received this honor on October 2, 2004, during halftime of the Miami game.

== Wreck traditions and specifications ==
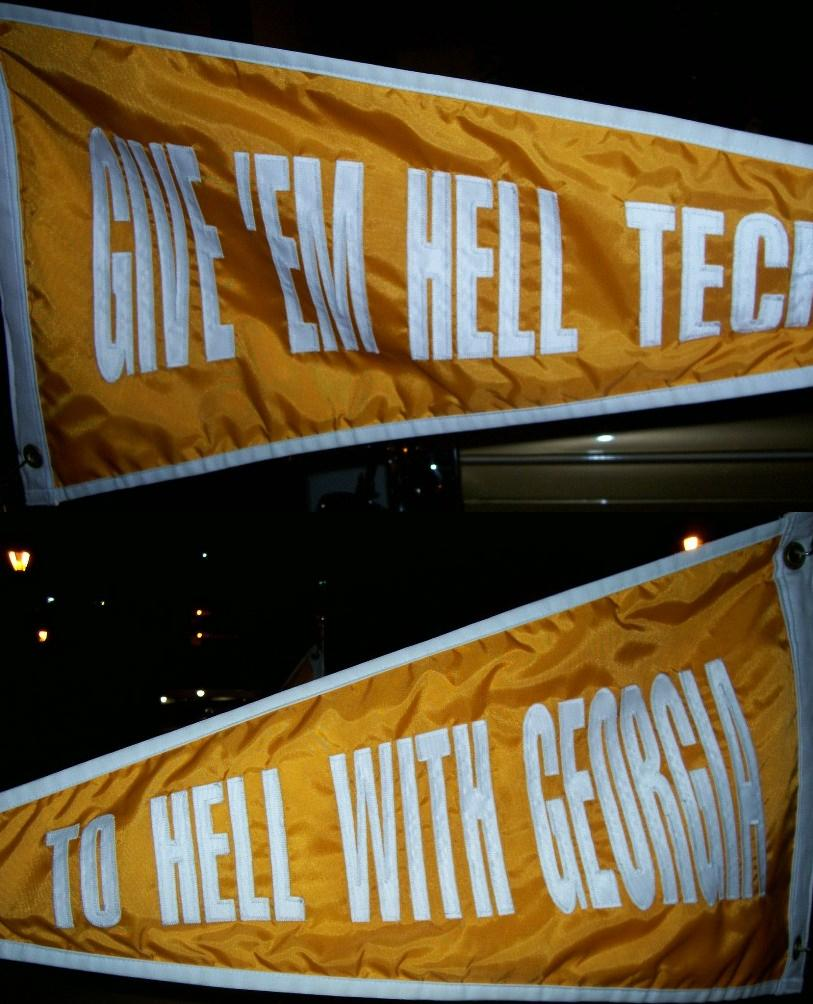
The Ramblin' Wreck's flags

There are several lesser known details about the Wreck that are easily missed when it rambles down Techwood Drive. Specific physical details and the actual person behind the wheel are often missed or overlooked. The Wreck is financially maintained through Ramblin' Reck Club appearances and fundraisers. There is no official source of funding from the institute, Athletic Association, or Alumni Association. This gives the Wreck a unique level of independence that is atypical amongst college mascots.

When a freshman first reaches campus for FASET (orientation), one of the many traditions that they are introduced to is that freshmen cannot touch the Wreck until the completion of their first year. This rule originated in the 1963 edition of the RAT Rules. If a freshman touches the Wreck between convocation and the last day of classes in the Spring, they will receive bad luck throughout their college career and GT will be cursed to lose to UGA in football that year.

The Wreck is distinguished by its old gold body and white soft top. The soft top has a chrome support strut, which features a brass classic Tech T and 1952 yellow jacket. The body also has two solid black running boards, which run the length of the vehicle. The running boards support cheerleaders when riding out on to the field. The interior upholstery is solid white vinyl. The gear shifter knob is a white globe with the classic Tech T painted on it. There are two golden nylon pennants emblazoned with the words "To Hell With Georgia" and "Give 'Em Hell Tech" fastened to the front bumper.

=== Driver ===
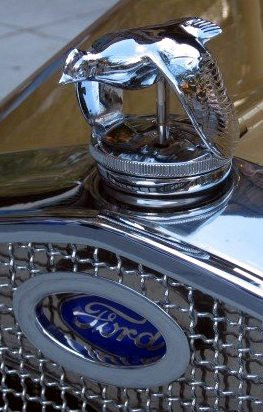
The Ramblin' Wreck radiator cap

The Driver of the Ramblin' Wreck is an elected position within Ramblin' Reck Club. This position is determined after every football season. The Driver manages the car's public appearances and maintenance. There have been 63 Drivers of the Wreck, as of 2026, making the position of Wreck Driver one of the most prestigious positions in all of Georgia Tech's student organizations.

The Driver gets to add their own personal touch every year to the Wreck. The front license plate is chosen by the driver every year and the radiator cap is replaced yearly, as well. The cap is typically a flying quail. After each driver's term, the driver gets to keep the two pennants, too.

Dean Dull initiated a group known as the Ramblin' Wreck Committee of the Student Council to aid in his search for a mascot. When the Wreck was found in 1961, the Ramblin' Wreck Committee was chaired by Dekle Rountree. Rountree would drive the Wreck for school functions and Student Council fundraisers. He was also the first person to drive the Ramblin' Wreck onto Grant Field. Don Gentry, the president of Reck Club in 1961, was the first student to drive the Wreck as he aided in retrieving the Model A from Ted Johnson's home. The Wreck was always maintained by Reck Club but the complete transition of control occurred between 1964 and 1967. During this period, Reck Club was relieved of its RAT rules enforcement duties and given more wholesome jobs of maintaining the Wreck, upholding traditions, and generating school spirit.

Seven women have officially driven the Ramblin' Wreck in its history, as of 2026. Lisa Volmar, an industrial engineering major, was elected the driver in 1984 and she was the first female driver after 23 consecutive years of male-only drivers.

=== Reck or Wreck ===
The name can be spelled either Ramblin' Reck or Ramblin' Wreck. In all spellings, there is no g in Ramblin'. The first references to the 1930 Model A (1961) spelled the word Reck while the first references to the 1914 Model T owned by Dean Field spelled the word 'Reck (1925). Ramblin' Reck Club has spelled the word Reck since their 1945 club charter. The institute has adopted the spelling Ramblin' Wreck and holds a trademark on the phrase. Reck Club still refers to the Ramblin' Wreck as the Ramblin' Reck while most other agencies refer to it as the Ramblin' Wreck.

== Travelin' Wreck ==
In its history, the Wreck has appeared at a number of away games and other events away from the Georgia Tech campus. Many of these trips resulted in damage to the Reck or other interesting anecdotes.

The first away game for the Ramblin' Wreck was the 1961 game against the Alabama Crimson Tide. The Wreck was freighted by Southern Railway to Birmingham, Alabama. At the time, Alabama played its home games at Legion Field. Before the game, the current driver Dekle Rountree decided to traverse the slope up to visit Birmingham's Vulcan statue. The trip to Birmingham was such a success, a trip to Jacksonville for Tech's Gator Bowl appearance against Penn State was organized, as well. These were the first road and bowl game appearances for the Wreck in its illustrious career.

In 1963, the Ramblin' Wreck Committee and Ramblin' Reck Club organized another road trip for the Wreck. This trip took the Wreck up to Knoxville for a game against the Tennessee Volunteers. After Tech won the game, the Wreck was stored overnight in Neyland Stadium. Administrators and Tennessee's Athletic Director Bob Woodruff promised Georgia Tech Athletics that the Wreck would be safe. They were wrong. Tennessee students broke into the storage area and painted the Wreck orange. They wrote "Go Vols" in the paint and covered the gold wheels with paint, as well. After the incident, Georgia Tech sent a bill to Tennessee's Athletic Department asking for restitution. Woodruff was believed to have aided the students in their efforts after he openly contested the officiating of the football contest.

In 1976, Tech students took the Wreck to Athens for the annual football game with UGA. After the game, the Wreck's police escort abandoned the car. The vehicle appeared relatively unprotected and was approached by UGA students attempting to vandalize it. The Tech students responsible for the car's safekeeping frightened the encroaching Bulldog fans away by producing a concealed 9 mm pistol.

The farthest trips the Ramblin' Wreck has ever traveled from Atlanta were the 1970 Sun Bowl in El Paso, Texas, and Denver, Colorado, in 1990 for Tech's NCAA Final Four appearance against UNLV. The Wreck was freighted by van 1,400 miles (2,250 km) to Denver Coliseum. Along the way, a television crew documented the trip and broadcast the Wreck's expedition during the Final Four promotions.

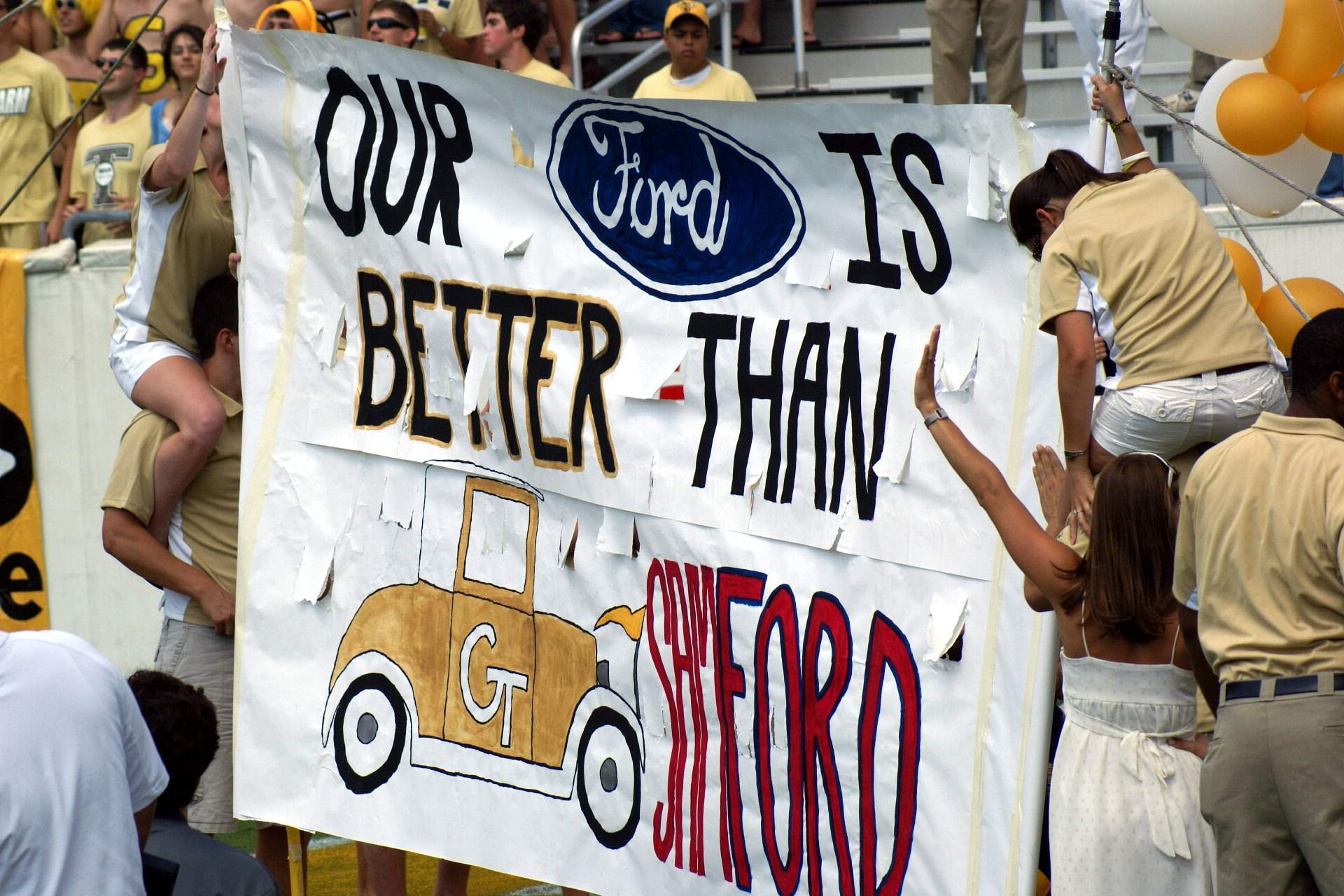
This banner was displayed before the Wreck's unveiling after the 2007 accident. Shown at the 2007 Georgia Tech vs Samford football game, it states that "Our Ford is better than Samford".

The last major road trips for the Ramblin' Wreck were to the 2004 Final Four in San Antonio, the 2006 ACC Championship Game in Jacksonville, Florida, and the 2009 ACC Championship Game in Tampa's Raymond James Stadium. The Wreck led the Yellow Jacket football team onto Alltel Stadium's field for Tech's first appearance in the ACC title game, as well as performing the same duty in their second appearance and first win in the ACC championship game in 2009. The Wreck has also been to the Orange Bowl, Gator Bowl, All-American Bowl, Sun Bowl, Peach Bowl, Citrus Bowl, and Champs Sports Bowl.

On June 15, 2007, the Wreck was involved in an accident while being towed to a wedding south of Atlanta in a covered car trailer. The trailer failed while carrying the Wreck, in turn causing the truck and trailer to run off the road and into the roadside ditch. The Wreck fell over inside the trailer, causing damage to its side and roof. Despite the severe body damage (in excess of $30,000), the Wreck was repaired for the first game of the 2007 season against the Samford Bulldogs.

== In the media ==
In 1987, the Ramblin' Wreck and Dean Jim Dull were featured on Good Morning America. Dull was on the show because he had won a make-a-wish contest. All he wanted was for the Ramblin' Wreck, gold-clad students, and himself to be on the show and American Broadcasting Company granted the wish.

The Ramblin' Wreck has been featured in several newspapers, magazines, and books. The Ramblin' Wreck is portrayed leading the Georgia Tech football team onto the field on the cover of Al Thomy's 1973 work Ramblin' Wreck – A Story of Georgia Tech Football. Pete George's 1982 refurbishment was featured in the November 1983 edition of the Ford Times. The June 1986 edition of Cars & Parts Magazine featured the Ramblin' Wreck and the raffle for the Centennial Wreck. The December 1991 Car Collector & Car Classics featured the Wreck on the cover after the National Championship season. The December 2007 Bellsouth Real White Pages for Greater Atlanta featured the Ramblin' Wreck with censored flags.

In the week prior to the 2007 home opener, the Ramblin' Wreck was featured on ESPN First Take. ESPN showed old clips of the Wreck leading the football team onto the field and discussed the possibility of the Wreck not making the football opener after 45 consecutive years of never missing a game.

The Ramblin' Wreck was featured prominently on the October 18, 2007 episode of Jim Cramer's Mad Money. Cramer exited the Wreck's passenger door to start the show and one of Cramer's trademark soundboards was attached to the front bumper.

In April 2009, a Georgia Tech student riding on the running board of the Ramblin' Wreck fell and suffered severe head injuries, when one of the handles which he was holding on to suddenly snapped off as the driver made a left turn, hospitalizing the student for four days and resulting in traumatic brain injury and a permanent loss of his senses of smell and taste. The student filed suit against Georgia Tech and an auto shop responsible for installing handles on the roof of the car citing the failure of the auto shop's handles as the reason for the fall and claims the university promoted the unsafe use of a vehicle by students. In September 2013, the student won a settlement of $1.36 million from the Board of Regents of the University System of Georgia and Eco-Clean, Inc.

The NCAA Football 12 video game featured the Ramblin' Wreck leading Georgia Tech's football team onto the field at all games played in Bobby Dodd Stadium.

== Ramblin' replicas ==
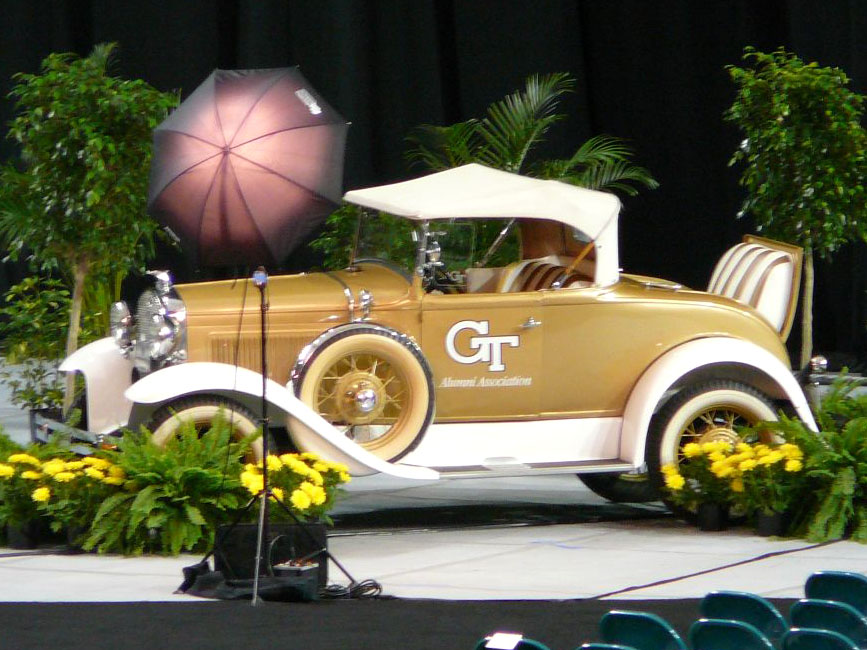
The Alumni Association's "Alumni Reck", a 1931 Ford Model A Roadster

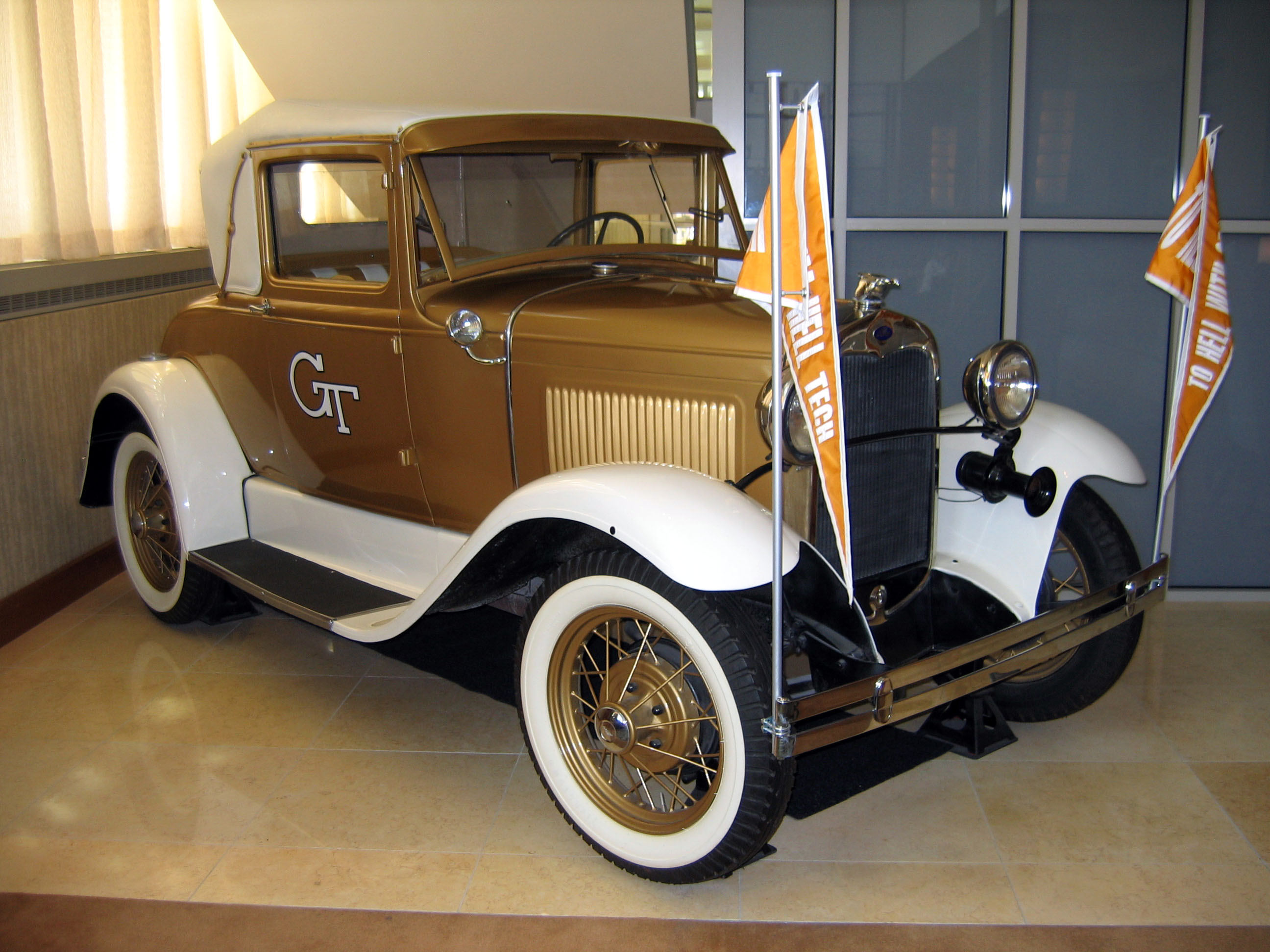
The 1930 Ford Model A Sports Coupe shell in the Georgia Tech Hotel and Conference Center

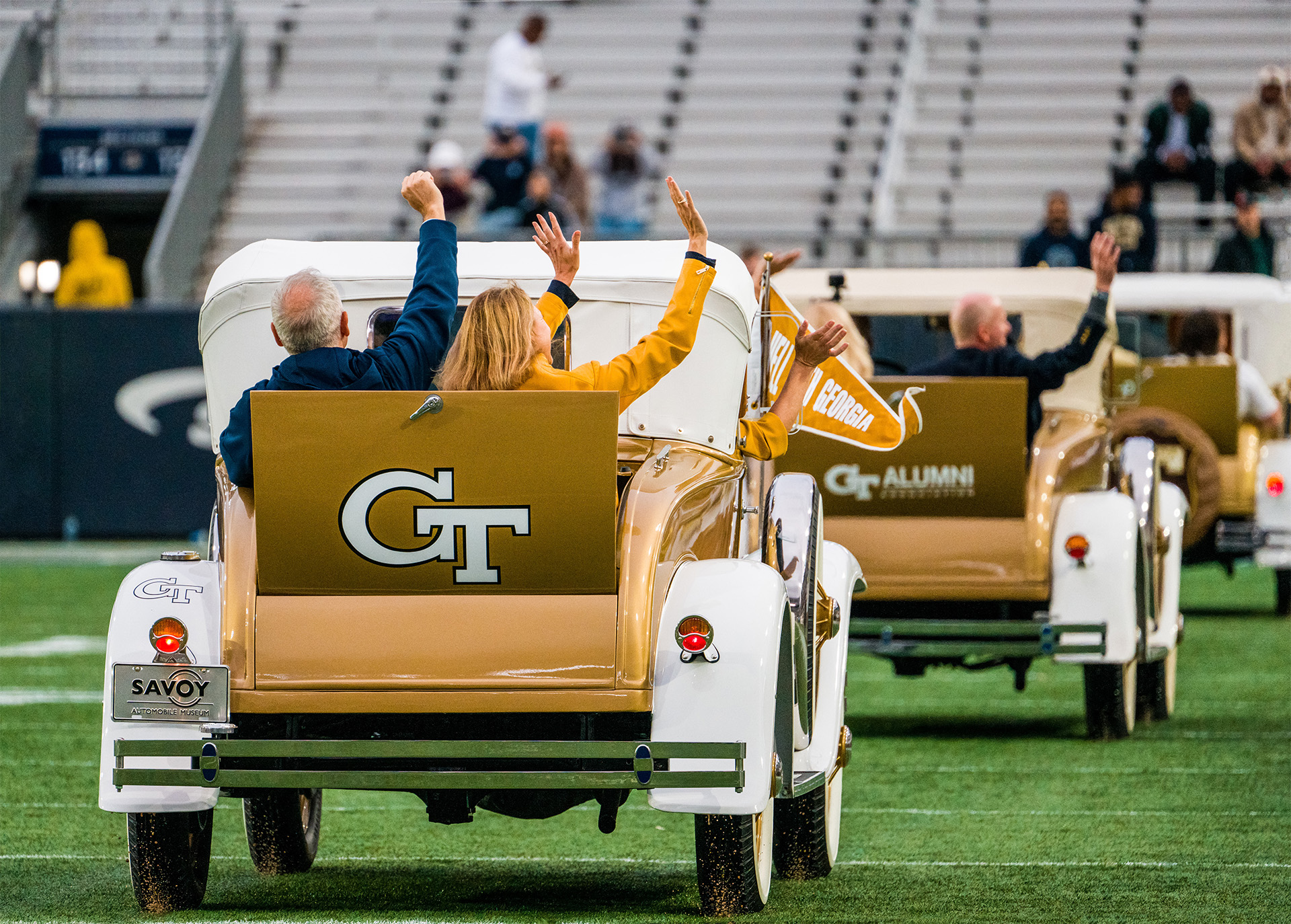
The Ramblin' Wreck replica owned by Savoy Automobile Museum on the field for the GT vs Miami football game on November 12, 2022.

Several vehicles claim "Ramblin' Wreck status." However, only one car is the official Ramblin' Wreck, with no backups or equivalent vehicles.

- The most famous of the fake Wrecks is a 1931 Ford Model A Cabriolet known as the Centennial Wreck. This vehicle was refurbished along with the real Wreck in 1985. The vehicle followed the Ramblin' Wreck onto the field all of the 1985 football season and was raffled for $250,000 by Pete George and Georgia Tech in 1986.
- In 1988, the Alumni Association purchased a 1931 Ford Model A Roadster and restored the vehicle again in 1994. The Alumni Wreck is distinguished by its spare tire locations on the driver's side and passenger-side runningboards and the words "Georgia Tech Alumni Association" printed on the doors. It also has a convertible top. On the real Wreck, the spare is behind the rumble seat and the roof cannot be removed or lowered.
- A 1930 Ford Model A Sports Coupe shell is kept in the Georgia Tech Hotel. This car has not worked since it has been on campus. The motor is incomplete and the front end lacks the Wreck's chrome stone guard. This is one of the few replicas that is almost identical in make, model, and paint scheme when compared to the real Ramblin' Wreck.
- Also, several alumni-owned vehicles are painted to resemble the Wreck. These vehicles mimic the look and feel of the car, but are not the Ramblin' Wreck. One of the most famous instances of mistaken identity occurred in 1988 when a father-son duo of Georgia Tech alumni attempted to lead the Tech football team onto the field at Sanford Stadium in Athens. After getting inside of the stadium with their gold 1924 Ford Model T, the two were finally stopped by Georgia officials, who were informed the real Ramblin' Wreck had remained in Atlanta.
- Several B-17 Flying Fortresses and B-24 Liberators and at least one F4U Corsair were designated the name Ramblin' Wreck during service in World War II.
- The Chicago Brewing Company features an amber ale by the name of Ramblin' Wreck Amber Ale.
- The Savoy Automobile Museum in Cartersville, GA features a Ramblin' Wreck replica in their permanent collection

== See also ==
- Clean, Old-Fashioned Hate – the rivalry between Tech and UGA
- Georgia Tech traditions – a comprehensive list of Georgia Tech Traditions
- Ramblin' Wreck from Georgia Tech – the fight song of Georgia Tech
- WREK FM – the college radio station of Georgia Tech, whose name and callsign comes directly from the Reck

Other student-owned vintage and veteran vehicles:

- Jezebel – a 1916 Dennis Fire Engine at Imperial College London
- A 1929 Dennis Charabanc owned by Southampton University
- A 1902 James and Browne car and 1926 Ner-a-Car owned by the City and Guilds College
- A 1926 Morris truck owned by the Royal School of Mines

Similar vehicular mascots at other universities:

- The Boilermaker Special – A replica locomotive built on a truck chassis which has served as the official mascot of Purdue University since 1940.
- The Sooner Schooner – a pioneering wagon and a symbol of the University of Oklahoma
