= Cinder track =

Race track whose surface is composed of cinders

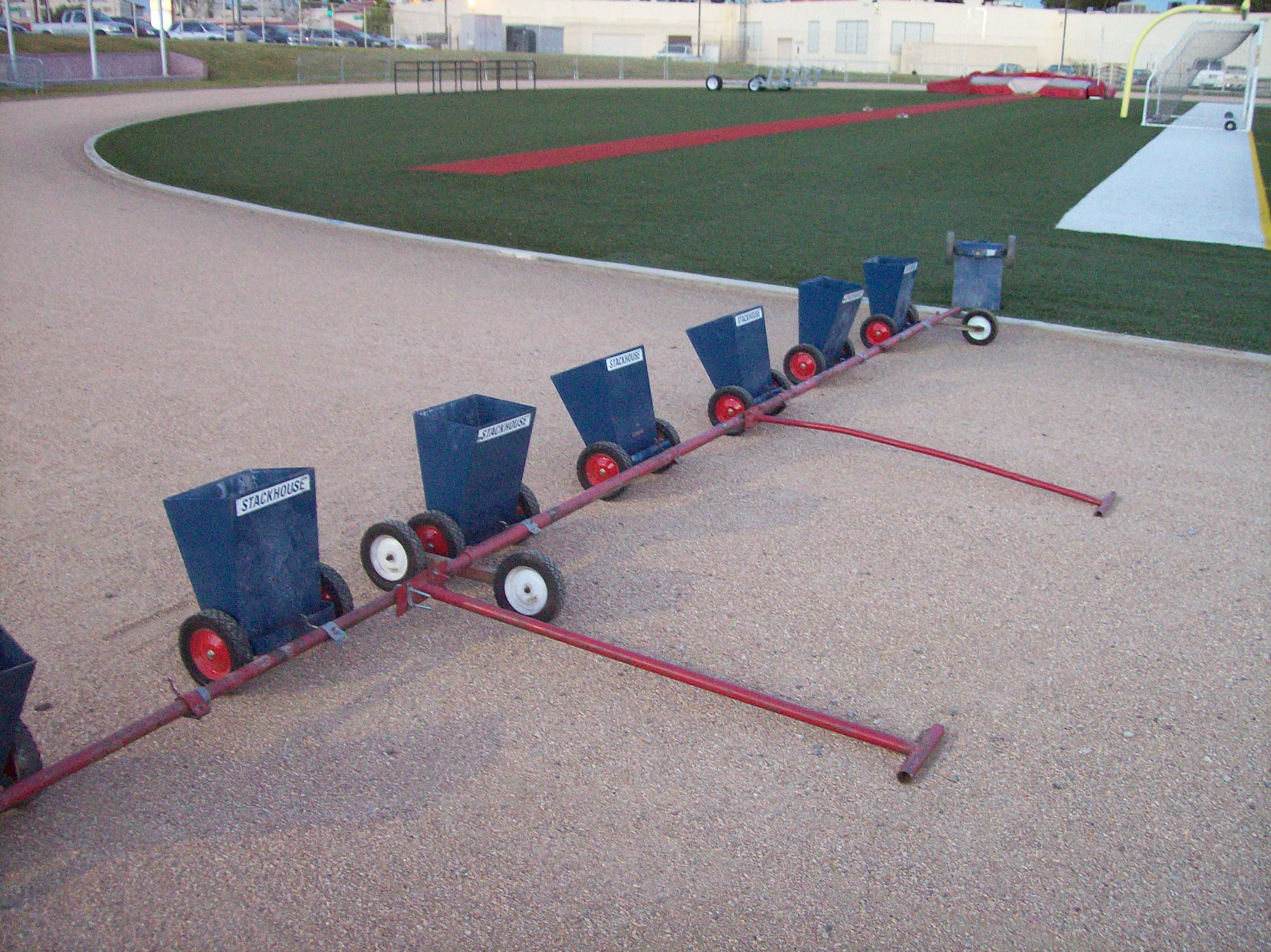
Equipment used for putting chalk lines on a cinder track.

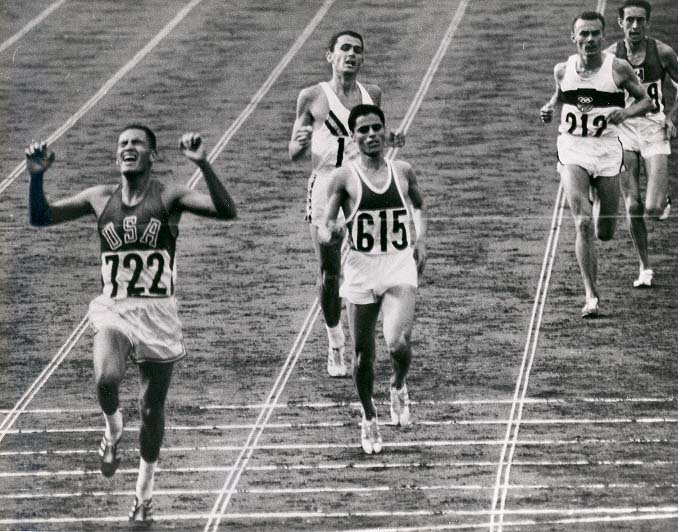
Billy Mills winning the 10,000 metres at the 1964 Summer Olympics, the last Olympics to be held on a cinder track

A cinder track is a type of race track, generally purposed for track and field or horse racing, whose surface is composed of scoria, also called cinders. For running tracks, many cinder surfaces have been replaced by all-weather synthetic surfaces, which provide greater durability and more consistent results, and are less stressful on runners, although the surface temperatures can be much hotter (up to 147 degrees Fahrenheit). The impact on performance as a result of differing track surfaces is a topic often raised when comparing athletes from different eras.

== Notable usage ==
Synthetic tracks emerged in the late 1960s; the 1964 Olympics were the last to use a cinder track.

The Little 500 bicycle race at Indiana University is still run annually on a cinder track.
