= Little 500 =

Track cycling race

Race details
- Date: Third weekend of April
- Nickname: Little Five
- Discipline: Track cycling
- Organiser: Indiana University Student Foundation
- Race director: Peter Schulz
- Web site: www.iusf.indiana.edu/little500/index.html

History (men)
- First edition: 1951
- Editions: 74
- First winner: South Hall Buccaneers (Collins)
- Most wins: Cutters (15)
- Most recent: 2026: Black Key Bulls (5th win)

History (women)
- First edition: 1988
- Editions: 37
- First winner: Willkie Sprint
- Most wins: Kappa Alpha Theta (10)
- Most recent: 2026: Alpha Chi Omega (1st Win)

The Little 500 (also known popularly as the "Little Five"), is a track cycling race held annually during the third weekend of April at Bill Armstrong Stadium on the campus of Indiana University in Bloomington, Indiana. It is attended by more than 25,000 fans.

== History ==
The race was founded in 1951 by Howard S. Wilcox Jr., executive director of the Indiana University Foundation, who modeled the race after the Indianapolis 500 automotive race, which his father, Howard S. Wilcox Sr. had won in 1919. Racers compete in teams of four, racing relay-style for 200 laps (50 mi (80 km)) along a quarter mile (440 yd (400 m)) cinder track. Thirty-three teams are selected in qualifications trials to compete in the main race. Money raised by the event funds scholarships for working Indiana University students. The event is similar to a Madison in that it is a relay but only one rider participates at a time.

The events of the Little 500 were dramatized in the 1979 Academy Award-winning movie Breaking Away, which depicts a group of Bloomington townies who enter the race as the "Cutters" (from the local Indiana limestone stonecutters) and defeat the favored fraternity teams. In the early 1980s following the release of Breaking Away, the very successful Delta Chi fraternity's cycling team left their house amidst a fallout and took the name Cutters as their now ‘independent’ team moniker. Their first race under this name was in 1984, which they won. The former fraternity team are now independent students, who are traditionally Bloomington locals, and have been tremendously successful, winning fifteen races that they have entered, with an average finish of 3.7, all while never finishing worse than 12th.

The inaugural Women's Little 500 was held in 1988. Four members of the Kappa Alpha Theta sorority completed a qualifications run in the 1987 men's event on their 3rd and final attempt, but failed to qualify into the field of 33. In 1988, the IU Student Foundation launched the Women's Race. Thirty-one teams competed in the first Women's Race which was won by an all-freshman team, Willkie Sprint, representing Willkie Residential Hall. Kappa Alpha Theta has been the most successful Women's Team, qualifying for every race, winning ten times with an average finish of 3.1.

The 2020 Men's and Women's Little 500 races were cancelled due to the COVID-19 pandemic. The race returned in 2021 but no spectators were allowed in the stadium due to Monroe County's, Indiana University's, and Big Ten Conference's COVID guidelines. Fans were allowed back to Bill Armstrong stadium for the 2022 races.

== Events surrounding the race ==
Billed as "The World's Greatest College Weekend," the race has expanded into a week of activities. The Women's Little 500 (100 laps; 25 mi (40 km)), first held in 1988, is run each year. Other events such as the Little Fifty Running Relay Race and Alumni Races add to the festivities. During his run for presidency, then-senator Barack Obama made an unannounced visit to the Little 500 women's race in 2008. As of 2019, the Little 500 has raised a total of more than $2 million in scholarship funds.

== Rules ==
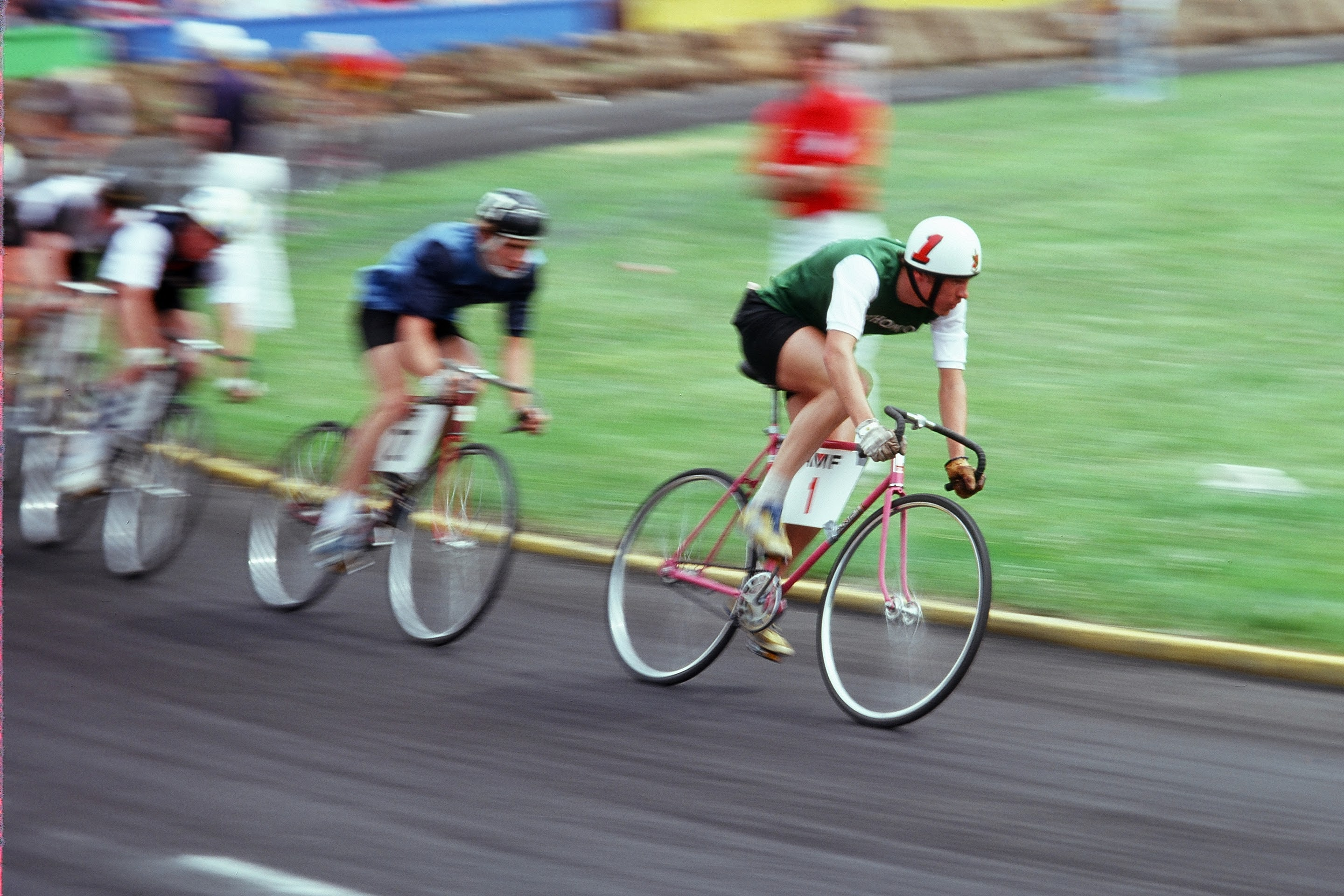
Riders compete in the Little 500 in 1977 at the Tenth Street Stadium

Special rules for the Little 500 race include:

1. All riders must use the official Little 500 bike that is provided to them for that year. There can be no toe clips or grips, kick stands, water bottles, air pumps, untaped or unplugged handlebars, or any other add-on accessories.
2. For the safety of all riders, hard helmets must be worn and buckled at all times, as well as biking gloves.
3. Each team is required to complete 10 exchanges (five for the women) during the course of the race.
4. At the 198th lap (98th for the women), all riders not on the lead lap will be asked to move to the back or exit the pack. This is done so that all teams in contention on their last two laps can make their attempt to win the race. Teams which do not comply with this rule are believed to be impeding the progress of another rider and will be given a 5- to 20-second penalty or even disqualification, depending on the severity of the violation.

== Little 500 bikes ==
Little 500 bicycles are standardized, single-speed, coaster brake racing bicycles with a 46x18 gearing, 700c wheels, 32mm tires and flat rubber pedals. The unusual specification originated with the famous AMF Roadmaster bicycles of the 1960s and 1970s, once the sole bicycle type used in the event. The men's and women's version differs only in frame size. Every year a new version of the specified bicycle type is purchased, with two given to each team. A deposit of $400 must be placed for both bikes. At the end of the season, teams are given the option to keep their race bikes or to return them to IUSF in exchange for their deposit. Returned former race bikes are kept at the track and rented out to teams that lack bicycles meeting Little 500 specifications. The current specification supplier is State Bicycle Company.

== Eligibility ==
Several criteria must be met by a student who desires to participate as a rider in the Little 500:

1. The student must be a full-time undergraduate student enrolled at Indiana University Bloomington Campus during the fall and spring semesters of the year of participation.
2. The student must have a cumulative GPA of 2.00 or better.
3. The student may only compete up to four times in a five-year period.
4. The student must be an amateur.
  1. The student cannot hold a USA Cycling or equivalent domestic ASN of Union Cycliste Internationale Class I or II licence, or have been classified as Class A in women's or Class B in men's road cycling.
  2. The student cannot have experience in national junior events.
  3. Any student who has competed in speed skating, mountain biking, or triathlons at a high domestic or international level is ineligible.
  4. Students who enter the school with no experience or a Category 5 licence, or has no experience, and advance to Class I or II after two years of participation in this event may only participate one more year.
5. No substance abuse of any type is tolerated.
6. For a team to be eligible, at least one member must attend all race information meetings and turn in the final four cards with the names of the team's riders for that year.

== Series events ==
The Little 500 includes four events beside the race itself: Qualifications, ITTs, Miss-N-Out, and Team Pursuit. These events are collectively known as "The Spring Series". The team that wins The Spring Series is also awarded a white jersey to wear during that year's race. These events also ensure that all the members of a team, not just those competing in the actual race itself, can still participate and compete.

=== Qualifications ===
Qualifications, commonly known as "Quals," is the first and one of the most important series events. Qualifications is a four-lap race around the track to see which team can get the fastest cumulative time. These times determine if a team qualifies to race in Little Five and, if so, where in the field of the top 33 teams they will be placed. Teams start the race lined up in 11 rows of three, starting with the pole winner up front on the inside, and teams choose their pits and jerseys in the order in which they qualify, so this is another reason to qualify high. Each team is given three attempts to qualify. The reason for this is in case a team botches an exchange, then they still have two more chances to qualify. The way that a team can fault on an exchange is if a member falls and takes the bike down with him, or if the team does not perform the exchange in the given distance, marked by white lines on the track. A team can use as many as four riders or as few as two riders. But whatever number of riders they use to qualify is the fewest riders they can use for Little Five. Meaning that if a team qualifies with four people, then that team must race with four people. But if they qualify using only three people, then they can use three or four people on the day of Little Five. The team that qualifies on the pole is given a green jersey for the race.

Due to the COVID-19 pandemic, 2021 qualifications were cancelled. The starting grid was determined by the results of the Team Pursuit Spring Series Event, with eventual winners, JETBLACH on pole for the Men's race and Alpha Xi Delta on pole for the Women's race.

Qualifications returned in 2022, with Kappa Alpha Theta on pole for the Women's race and Phi Kappa Psi on pole for the Men's Race.

2026 Pole Sitters:

Men's: Cutters

Women's: Kappa Alpha Theta

=== ITTs ===
Like a qualification, an Individual Time Trial (ITT) is a four-lap (one mile) sprint around the track. But unlike qualifications, it is performed individually. It is a test of both speed and sprint endurance. There are up to four riders on the track at a time. One rider is placed at each turn of the track. The riders line up with the start/finish line that is drawn in white on the track. Then a race official will come behind the rider and hold the bike steady so that the rider can set both feet on the pedals. In recent years, there has been a five-beep countdown, but in 2007 a gun start was used. The riders begin from a dead stop and race around the track. It is possible to catch other riders on the track while racing, but similar to most triathlon competitions, drafting is prohibited. A rider caught blatantly drafting off of another rider is automatically disqualified. In 2025, Alpha Chi Omega rider Libby Lewis became the first freshman ever to win ITTs.

ITTs All-Time Record:

Men's: 2005 Hans Arnesen (Alpha Tau Omega) - 02:15.78

Women's: 2018 Brooke Hannon (Melanzana) - 02:33.083

ITTs 2026 Winners:

Men's: Judah Thompson (Cutters) - 02:22.27

Women's: Leila Faraday (Teter) - 02:36:62

=== Miss-N-Out ===
A standard elimination race in track cycling, each heat consists of five to eight riders, depending on the number of riders signed up for the day. At the end of the second lap and each subsequent lap, the rider in last place at the end of each lap is eliminated and exits the track. Riders keep racing until there are only three riders left. These three riders move on to the next round. This process continues until the final heat of eight. In this heat, riders continue to race and get out until the last three remain and then they commence a one-lap full-out sprint and the first-, second- and third-place winners are determined by the order in which the riders cross the finish line.

2026 Miss-N-Out Men's Finals:

1st: Judah Thompson (Cutters)

2nd: Alex Hamilton (Sigma Phi Epsilon)

T-3rd: Drew Poplarski (Sigma Phi Epsilon)

T-3rd: Isaac Barker (Sigma Nu)

5th: Matthew Naas (Sigma Alpha Epsilon)

6th: Connor Furlong (Beta Sigma Psi)

2026 Miss-N-Out Women's Finals:

1st: Libby Lewis (Alpha Chi Omega)

2nd: Sophie Peterson (Melanzana)

3rd: Leila Faraday (Teter)

4th: Bailey Capella (Kappa Alpha Theta)

5th: Greta Hayl (Kappa Alpha Theta)

6th: Evelyn Morris (Melanzana)

=== Team Pursuit ===
Run under UCI rules for team pursuit in track cycling's version of the event, two teams of four race around the track. Unlike the UCI banked version, the race lasts 15 laps (6,000 meters), which is longer than a traditional UCI team pursuit by five laps, or 2,000 meters. The team's time is the time of the 3rd rider to cross the line. The final heat sees the two fastest teams race head-to-head. Up until 2021, the women's event was 10 laps (4,000 meters), which since 2012 is the standard international distance.

Team Pursuit All-Time Record:

Men's: 1986 Cutters - 08:38.81

Women's 10 Lap Record: 2011 Teter - 07:50.11

Women's 15 Lap Record: 2024 Kappa Alpha Theta - 10:16.95

Team Pursuit 2026 Winners:

Men's: Cutters

Women's: Teter

== Fall Series ==
Indiana University Student Foundation, as well as Riders Council, a group of students that make up the rules committee for the race, also offer fall events for students to participate in. They also offer skills clinics. Events in the Fall Series include ITTs, Street Sprints, CycloCross and Tuesday Night Race Series. Fall Series results do not count toward Little 500.

=== Tuesday Night Race Series ===
Each night is broken up into three events, all based on standard UCI track cycling formats.

- Scratch race - Men will compete ten laps and the women eight laps.
- Points race of twenty (men) or fifteen (women) laps
- Elimination race heats.

== Media coverage ==
Thirty years later, in 2009, Smithville produced a half-hour-long documentary, Ride Fast, Turn Left, that followed four teams preparing for and competing in the race. In February 2015, One Day in April was released which depicts two men's and two women's teams' preparation and dedication preceding the race.

A Bollywood movie Jo Jeeta Wohi Sikandar, based on the Little 500 and an adaptation of Breaking Away, was made in the year 1992, starring Aamir Khan.

Highlights of the 1981 race were shown on ESPN and the first major coverage was by CBS Sports Saturday for the 1982 race. CBS's auto racing announcer, Ken Squier called the race, with Dave Blase providing color commentary. The races have also been broadcast live on the Indiana University student radio station WIUX and on television since 2002 on AXS.tv (formerly known as HDNet), which is owned by Indiana University alumnus Mark Cuban.

== List of winners ==
Men's Race

Year	Winning team
2026	Black Key Bulls
2025	Black Key Bulls
2024	Black Key Bulls
2023	Cutters
2022	Phi Delta Theta
2021	JETBLACH
2020	Race canceled
2019	Cutters
2018	Cutters
2017	Black Key Bulls
2016	Delta Tau Delta
2015	Sigma Phi Epsilon
2014	Black Key Bulls
2013	Beta Theta Pi
2012	Delta Tau Delta
2011	Cutters
2010	Cutters
2009	Cutters
2008	Cutters
2007	Cutters
2006	Alpha Tau Omega
2005	Dodds House
2004	Cutters
2003	Gafombi
2002	The Corleones
2001	Phi Delta Theta
2000	Cutters
1999	Sigma Phi Epsilon
1998	Dodds House
1997	Cutters
1996	Phi Delta Theta
1995	Phi Gamma Delta
1994	Sigma Chi
1993	Delta Chi
1992	Cutters
1991	Acacia
1990	Sigma Nu
1989	Cinzano
1988	Cutters
1987	Phi Gamma Delta
1986	Cutters
1985	Alpha Epsilon Pi
1984	Cutters
1983	Acacia
1982	Phi Delta Theta
1981	Delta Chi
1980	Delta Chi
1979	Delta Chi
1978	Phi Kappa Psi
1977	Delta Chi
1976	Delta Chi
1975	Phi Gamma Delta
1974	Delta Chi
1973	Delta Chi
1972	Kappa Sigma
1971	Alpha Tau Omega
1970	Sigma Phi Epsilon
1969	Alpha Tau Omega
1968	Phi Kappa Psi
1967	Phi Gamma Delta
1966	Phi Kappa Psi
1965	Phi Gamma Delta
1964	Beta Theta Pi
1963	Sigma Alpha Epsilon
1962	Phi Kappa Psi
1961	Acacia
1960	Phi Kappa Psi
1959	Phi Kappa Psi
1958	Phi Kappa Psi
1957	Sigma Nu
1956	Phi Gamma Delta
1955	South Cottage Grove
1954	Sigma Nu
1953	North Hall Friars
1952	North Hall Friars (Collins)
1951	South Hall Buccaneers (Collins)

Women's Race

Year	Winning team
2026	Alpha Chi Omega
2025	Kappa Alpha Theta
2024	Kappa Alpha Theta
2023	Melanzana
2022	Melanzana
2021	Delta Gamma
2020	Race canceled
2019	Teter
2018	Kappa Alpha Theta
2017	Kappa Alpha Theta
2016	Phoenix
2015	Kappa Alpha Theta
2014	Kappa Alpha Theta
2013	Delta Gamma
2012	Delta Gamma
2011	Teter
2010	Teter
2009	Pi Beta Phi
2008	Delta Gamma
2007	Kappa Delta
2006	Kappa Kappa Gamma
2005	Teter
2004	Kappa Kappa Gamma
2003	Kappa Alpha Theta
2002	Roadrunners
2001	Roadrunners
2000	Kappa Alpha Theta
1999	Kappa Kappa Gamma
1998	Kappa Kappa Gamma
1997	Roadrunners
1996	Kappa Kappa Gamma
1995	Kappa Alpha Theta
1994	Kappa Alpha Theta
1993	Landsharks
1992	Landsharks
1991	Le Pas
1990	Team Sprint
1989	Beyond Control
1988	Willkie Sprint
