= Joe Brooks (researcher) =

American researcher

- Born: 1960 (age 65–66)
- Education: Georgia Institute of Technology (BS, MS)
- Known for: Electronic systems research
- Scientific career
- Workplaces: Georgia Tech Research Institute

Joseph Brooks (born 1960) is an American academic who is the deputy director of Electronics, Optics, and Systems at Georgia Tech Research Institute. He is the former director of the GTRI Electronic Systems Laboratory (ELSYS).

== Early life, education and adulthood ==
Joseph Larry Brooks is the third of three children born to Charles William Brooks and Grace Mitchell Brooks of Hiram, Georgia in March 1960. Brooks attended the University of Georgia from 1978 to 1980 before transferring to the Georgia Institute of Technology, where he earned a Bachelor of Science in electrical engineering in 1982 and Master of Science in Electrical Engineering in 1986.

Brooks married his Kellie Williams Brooks in 1984 and they have two children.

== Career ==
Brooks worked as a student assistant at the Georgia Tech Research Institute while earning his bachelor's degree, and was hired as research engineer I in 1982 once he received his bachelor's degree. He worked at GTRI full-time while earning his master's degree, in what was then known as the Systems Engineering Lab (now the Electronic Systems Laboratory).

In November 2010, the previous director of the Electronic Systems Laboratory retired, and Brooks was named interim lab director. In January 2011, he was named the director of the lab. He held this position until 2014, when he was named deputy director of the newly created Electronics, Optics, and Systems Directorate, which oversees ELSYS as well as the Electro-Optical Systems Laboratory and the Applied Systems Laboratory.
