= Opar =

Opar or OPAR may refer to:

- Opar (fictional city), a fictional lost city in Edgar Rice Burroughs's series of Tarzan novels
- Opar (state constituency), a state constituency of Malaysia
- Opar, Albania
- OPAR L'Orientale Open Archive, the institutional repository of the University of Naples, Italy
- Objectivism: The Philosophy of Ayn Rand, a book by Leonard Peikoff
- GTRI Office of Policy Analysis and Research, a think tank at the Georgia Tech Research Institute
- OPAR, a defunct subsidiary of Turkish automaker Tofaş
