= James M. McGarrah =

American engineer and naval officer (born 1951)

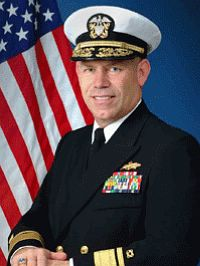
- Born: 1951 (age 74–75); United States
- Education: United States Naval Academy, Pepperdine University, Georgia Institute of Technology
- Scientific career
- Fields: Mechanical engineering
- Workplaces: United States Navy, Cingular Wireless, BellSouth, Georgia Tech Research Institute

James "Jim" M. McGarrah is the chief of staff at the Georgia Tech Research Institute. He was previously director of the Information and Communications Laboratory at the Georgia Tech Research Institute and is a retired officer of the United States Navy Reserve.

== Early life and education ==
McGarrah attended Francis C. Hammond High School in Alexandria, Virginia, graduating in 1969.

McGarrah graduated from the United States Naval Academy in Annapolis, Maryland with a Bachelor of Science in mechanical engineering in 1973. He also holds a Master of Arts in human resource management from Pepperdine University in 1978 and a Master of Science in mechanical engineering from the Georgia Institute of Technology in 1979. While at Georgia Tech, he took a job as a graduate teaching assistant.

== Navy ==
In 1973, McGarrah received his naval commission, and served in the United States Navy and the United States Navy Reserve for a total of 33 years. From 1973 to 1976, he served on the USS Belknap (CG-26) as Electronic Warfare Officer and Damage Control Assistant, and on the USS Hoist (ARS-40) after the Belknap's collision with the John F. Kennedy in 1975.

In 2003, he was nominated for promotion from rear admiral (lower half) to rear admiral.

On July 9, 2004, when McGarrah was a rear admiral, the Secretary of the Navy, Gordon R. England, appointed him the Director of the Office for the Administrative Review of the Detention of Enemy Combatants (OARDEC).

McGarrah testified before the Senate Judiciary Committee about the Combatant Status Review Tribunals (CSRT), held in the Guantanamo Bay detainment camps, in Cuba, from July 2004 to March 2005. McGarrah testified that, to take into account the concerns of United States Supreme Court rulings the CSRT were modelled after Army Regulations 190-8 (Enemy Prisoners of War, Retained Personnel, Civilian Internees and Other Detainees), subchapter 1–6, Tribunals.

While he was in the military, he was awarded the Defense Distinguished Service Medal, the Legion of Merit, the Bronze Star Medal, two Meritorious Service Medals, three Navy and Marine Corps Commendation Medals, and a Navy and Marine Corps Achievement Medal. Since September 2009, McGarrah has been the Georgia Chair of the Employer Support of the Guard and Reserve.

== Industry ==
McGarrah spent 24 years working for the telecommunications industry, primarily for Southern Bell, BellSouth and Cingular Wireless.

McGarrah came to the Georgia Tech Research Institute in November 2008, taking the position of director of the Information Technology and Telecommunications Laboratory (ITTL). He was instrumental in the split of that lab into the GTRI Information and Communications Laboratory and the GTRI Cyber Technology and Information Security Laboratory.

As of May 1, 2013, McGarrah will be GTRI's Chief of Staff, an ambassador / spokesperson role.
