= Marcus Nanotechnology Building =

Research building at Georgia Tech

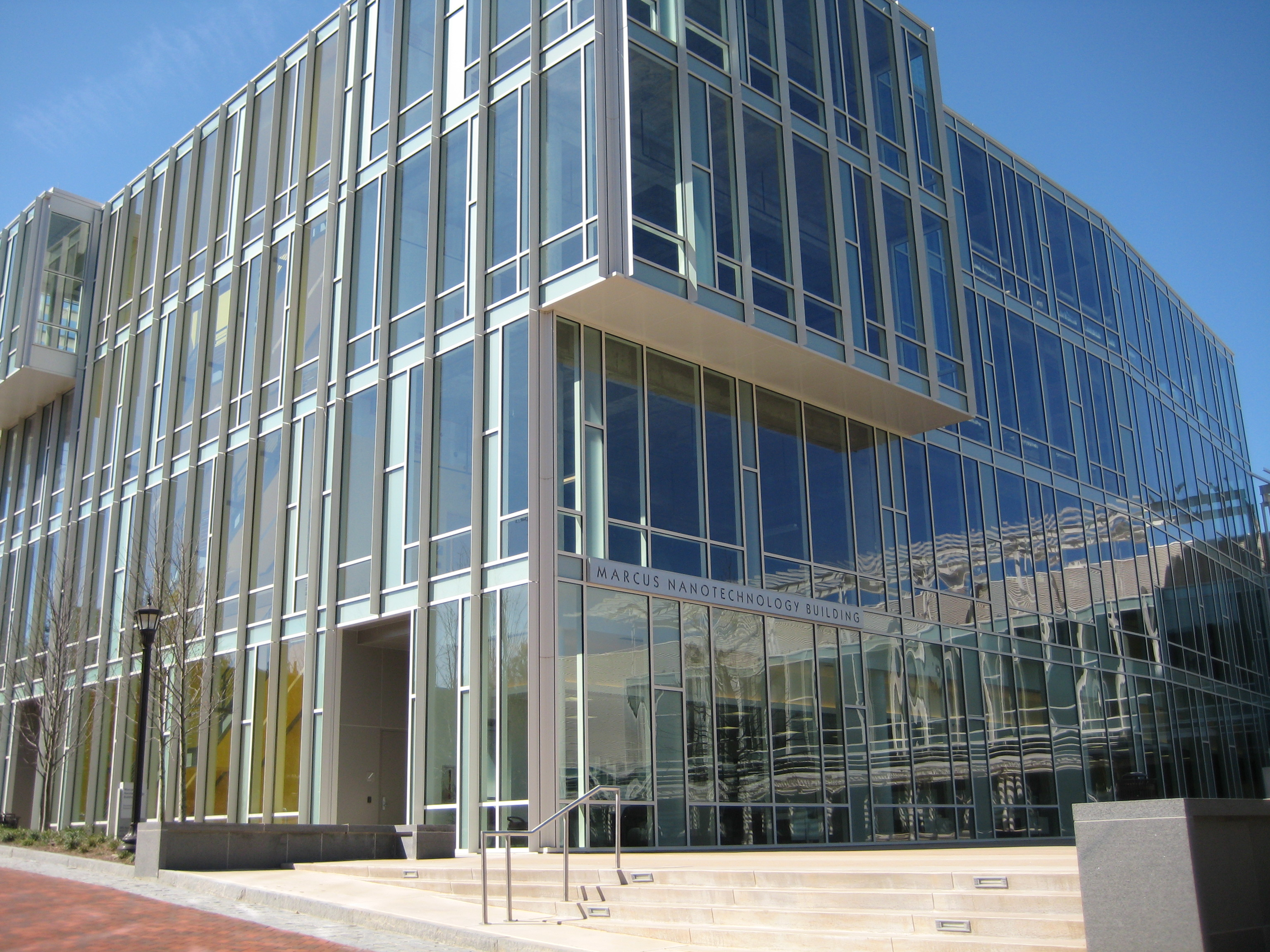
- Nanotechnology Research Center in Spring 2010
- Interactive map of the Marcus Nanotechnology Building area
- Former names: Marcus Nanotechnology Research Center

General information
- Location: Atlanta, Georgia, USA, Ferst Drive
- Coordinates: 33.778728°N 84.398611°W
- Construction started: Announced October 2003, ground broken August 7, 2006
- Completed: Spring 2009
- Owner: Georgia Institute of Technology

Technical details
- Floor count: 4

Design and construction
- Architect: Bohlin Cywinski Jackson m+w zander
- Other designers: Research Facilities Design
- Main contractor: Whiting-Turner

The Marcus Nanotechnology Building (MNB) is a Georgia Institute of Technology facility. The building was constructed on the site of the Electronics Research Building, the former home of GTRI's Information and Communications Laboratory. It was opened on April 24, 2009, as the Marcus Nanotechnology Research Center, a name it held until October 2013.

== Research ==
The Marcus Nanotechnology Building (MNB) is now the headquarters for the Institute for Matter and Systems (IMS), one of Georgia Tech's several new Interdisciplinary Research Institutes (IRI). In addition to being the headquarters for the IMS, the building houses the largest cleanroom laboratory dedicated to the fabrication, characterization, and assembly of biomedical and semiconductor devices in the Southeast United States.

These shared-user open laboratories are part of the National Science Foundation's National Nanotechnology Infrastructure Network (NNIN), a network of 14 such facilities at universities around the US. The laboratories are available to global academics, industry and government personnel on a fee recovery basis enabling students, scientists and engineers who perform research on nanotechnology to study the characteristics and behavior of atoms and molecules, and to use that knowledge to create new materials and tiny nano-scale tools and machines.

== Status ==
The Information and Communications Laboratory was previously located on the site, and has been moved to GCATT. The Electronics Research Building, established in 1966, was demolished, and construction began in Fall 2006/Spring 2007.

The construction was funded by several donations, including $7 million from the State of Georgia, $15 million from the Marcus Foundation, and $36 million from an anonymous source.
