= Steve Cross =

Steve Cross may refer to:

- Steve Cross (footballer), born 1959, English footballer
- Steve Cross, founder of Remote Control Records
- Stephen E. Cross, executive vice president for research at the Georgia Institute of Technology
- Steve Cross (comedian), British comedian
