= McGarrah =

McGarrah may refer to:

- James M. McGarrah (born 1951), United States Navy admiral
- McGarrah Jessee, advertising agency based in Austin, Texas
