= Donald J. Grace =

American electrical engineer

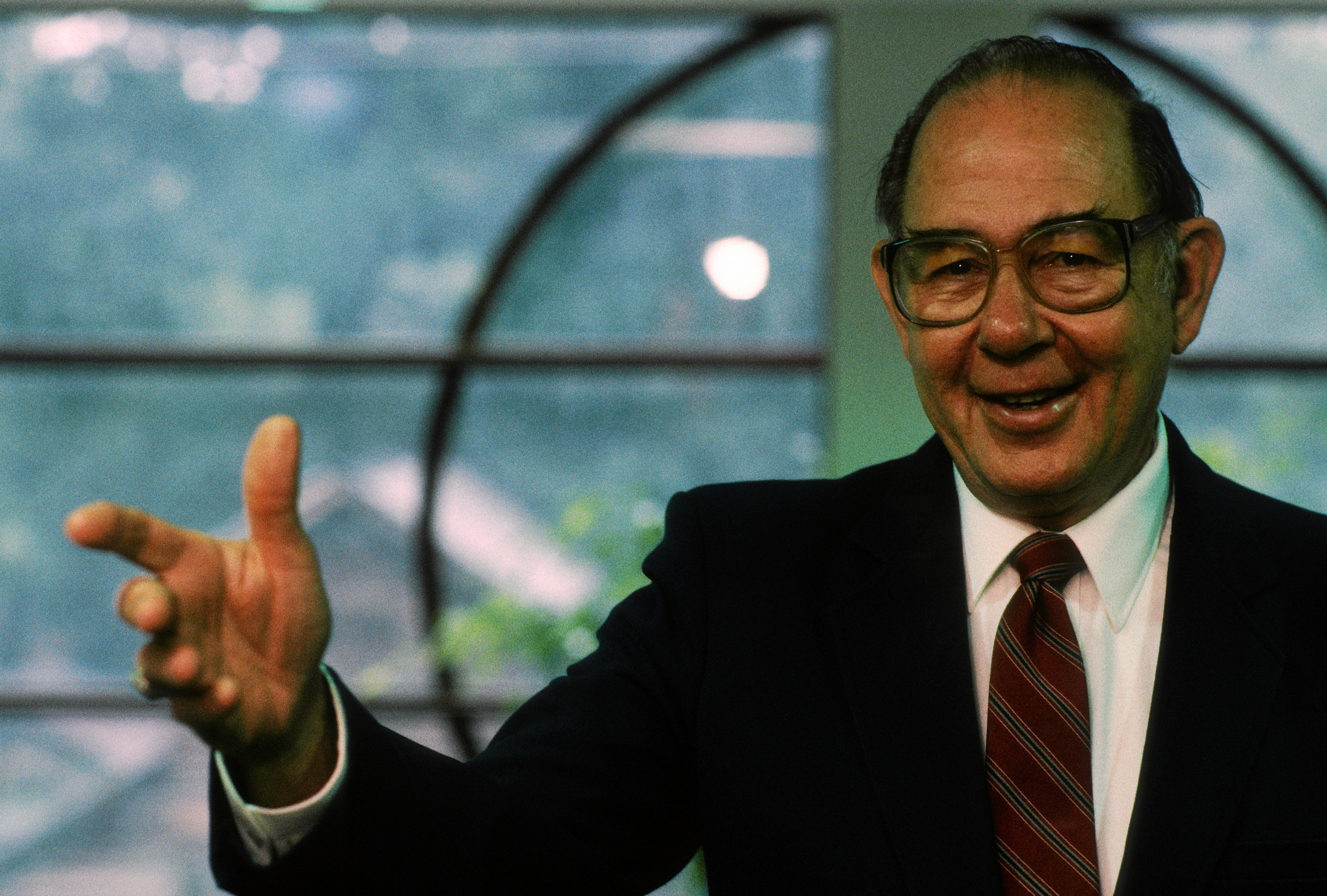
- Born: February 21, 1926; Oklahoma
- Died: March 15, 2007 (aged 81); Lawrenceville, Georgia
- Education: Stanford University
- Scientific career
- Fields: Electrical Engineering
- Workplaces: Stanford University; University of Hawaiʻi at Mānoa; Georgia Institute of Technology; Georgia Tech Research Institute

Donald J. Grace (February 21, 1926 – March 15, 2007) was an American Electrical Engineer. Grace was the longest-serving director of the Georgia Tech Research Institute, holding the position from 1976 to 1992.

== Career ==
Grace spent most of his early career at Stanford University, where he earned his PhD in electrical engineering in 1962 and was given a joint appointment to the electrical engineering faculty and the Systems and Techniques Laboratory. He rose quickly to become director of the lab and Associate Dean of Engineering at Stanford under Joseph M. Pettit.

In 1969, Grace took a position at the University of Hawaiʻi at Mānoa as the head of the Center for Engineering Research. He accepted the directorship of the Engineering Experiment Station at the Georgia Institute of Technology in 1976, succeeding Maurice W. Long and interim director Thomas E. Stelson. Grace was instrumental in the name change of the Engineering Experiment Station to the Georgia Tech Research Institute in 1984. "We're finally calling ourselves what we evolved into years ago," Grace said upon announcing the change.

During his tenure as director, the dollar value of GTRI's contracts increased by a factor of ten, from $10 million to $100 million. The number of labs increased to more than a dozen, and several new facilities opened, including the Advanced Technology Research Center, the Centennial Research Building and a four-building radar and electronics research center in Cobb County. Grace retired in 1992 in order to care for his wife, Joan, who had a degenerative muscle disease.
