= Blue Dart =

Blue Dart is a Georgia Tech Research Institute project to build an unmanned underwater vehicle, sponsored by the United States Navy.
