= Military use of free and open-source software =

Free and open-source software is used in applications, frameworks, and tools within various military contexts. This approach contrasts with traditional proprietary software, offering unique advantages like cost-effectiveness, flexibility, and collaborative development but also bringing such challenges as security breaches and reliability. Also, US military sees the pressure from the ongoing wars across the globe and challenges on behalf of authoritarian regimes, that pushes US Army to boost their technological advance, that leads to using more broadly of open source software.

== History ==
The use of open software in the military industry has been influenced by the broader acceptation of open-source software. Initially it gained criticism but also innovation, cost reduction, and thus it became more popular.

In 2003, The U.S. Department of Defense has officially authorized the use of open-source software, provided it meets departmental policies and security standards, according to a policy memo by John P. Stenbit. This decision was praised by open-source advocate Tony Stanco.

== Impact on military technology ==
Open software has significantly impacted military technology. It has been instrumental in developing command and control systems, cybersecurity measures, and simulation and training software. The adaptability of open software allows for rapid modification and customization, which is crucial in the dynamic military context.

== Examples of open software in military use ==
- Red Hat Enterprise Linux: Used in various defense systems for its stability and security.
- Distributed Interactive Simulation (DIS): An open standard for conducting real-time platform-level war simulation.
- The FalconView Mapping System: An open-source GIS software used by the U.S. Department of Defense.
