= Neely Nuclear Research Center =

Former nuclear research center in Georgia, US

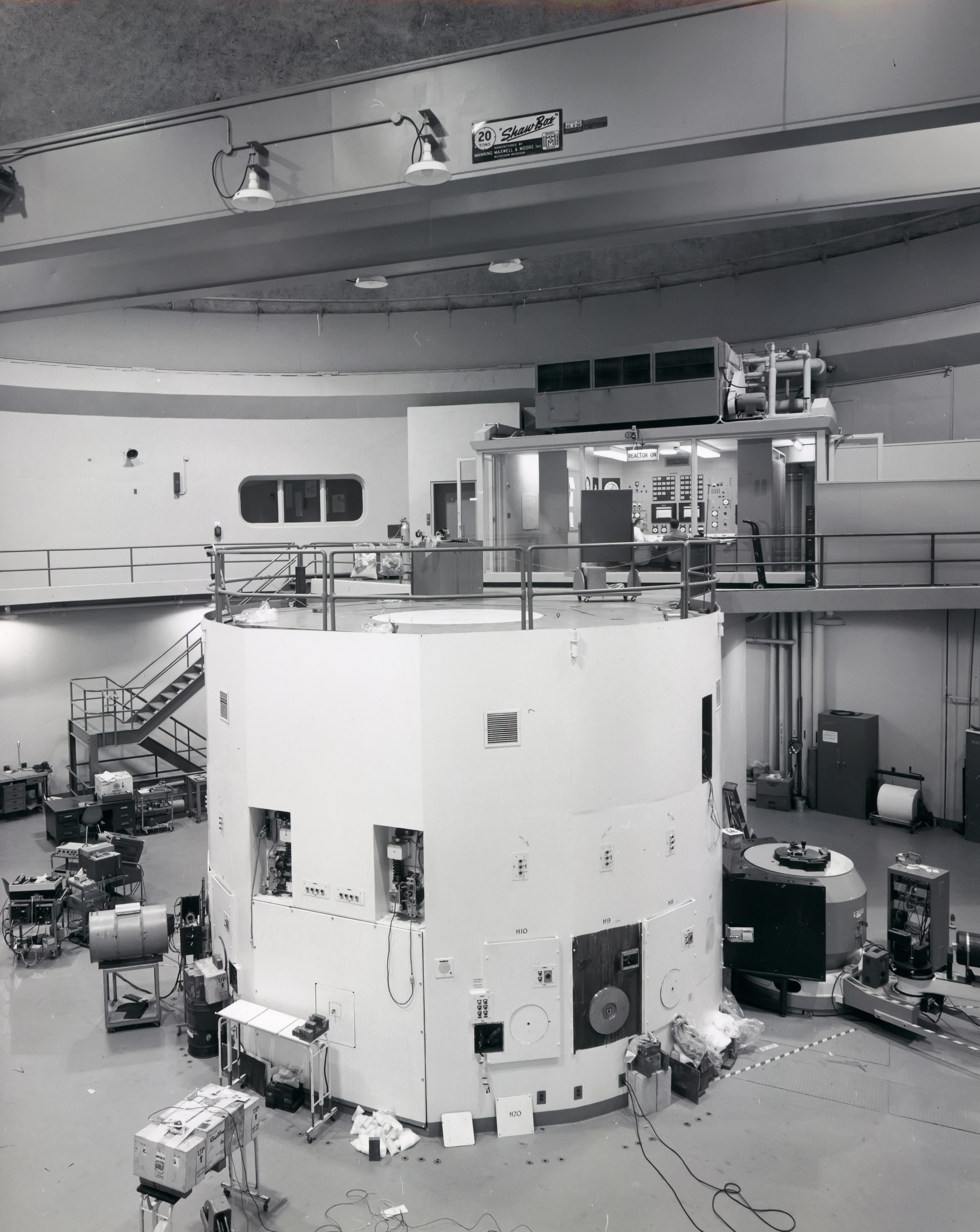
- Interactive map of the Neely Nuclear Research Center area
- Former names: Neely Research Reactor; Georgia Tech Research Reactor

General information
- Location: Atlanta, Georgia, USA, 900 Atlantic Drive NW
- Coordinates: 33.779609°N 84.39815°W
- Current tenants: Nuclear and Radiological Engineering Program; Georgia Tech Research Institute
- Completed: 1963
- Demolished: 2000
- Owner: Georgia Institute of Technology

Technical details
- Floor count: 1

The Frank H. Neely Nuclear Research Center, also known as the Neely Research Reactor and the Georgia Tech Research Reactor, was a nuclear engineering research center on the Georgia Institute of Technology campus, which housed a 5 megawatt heavy water moderated and cooled research reactor from 1961 until 1995. It was decommissioned in November 1999. The building that housed the reactor was demolished to make way for the Marcus Nanotechnology Research Center.

The center is named for Frank H. Neely, a Georgia Tech graduate and businessman who organized the first Georgia Nuclear Advisory Commission, an essential step in the creation of the reactor and associated facilities.

== History ==
The center and associated reactor was built after campus president Blake R. Van Leer appointed a Nuclear Science Committee, which included Georgia Tech Research Institute director James E. Boyd.

The committee recommended the creation of a Radioisotopes Laboratory Facility and a large research reactor. The laboratory was built and dedicated on January 7, 1959, and could receive, store, and process radioactive materials. The research reactor would be completed in 1963.

The reactor was shut down in 1988 due to safety concerns, and was defueled due to safety concerns related to the nearby 1996 Summer Olympics events.

The reactor building was torn down after the decommissioning, with the remainder removed as of 2015.

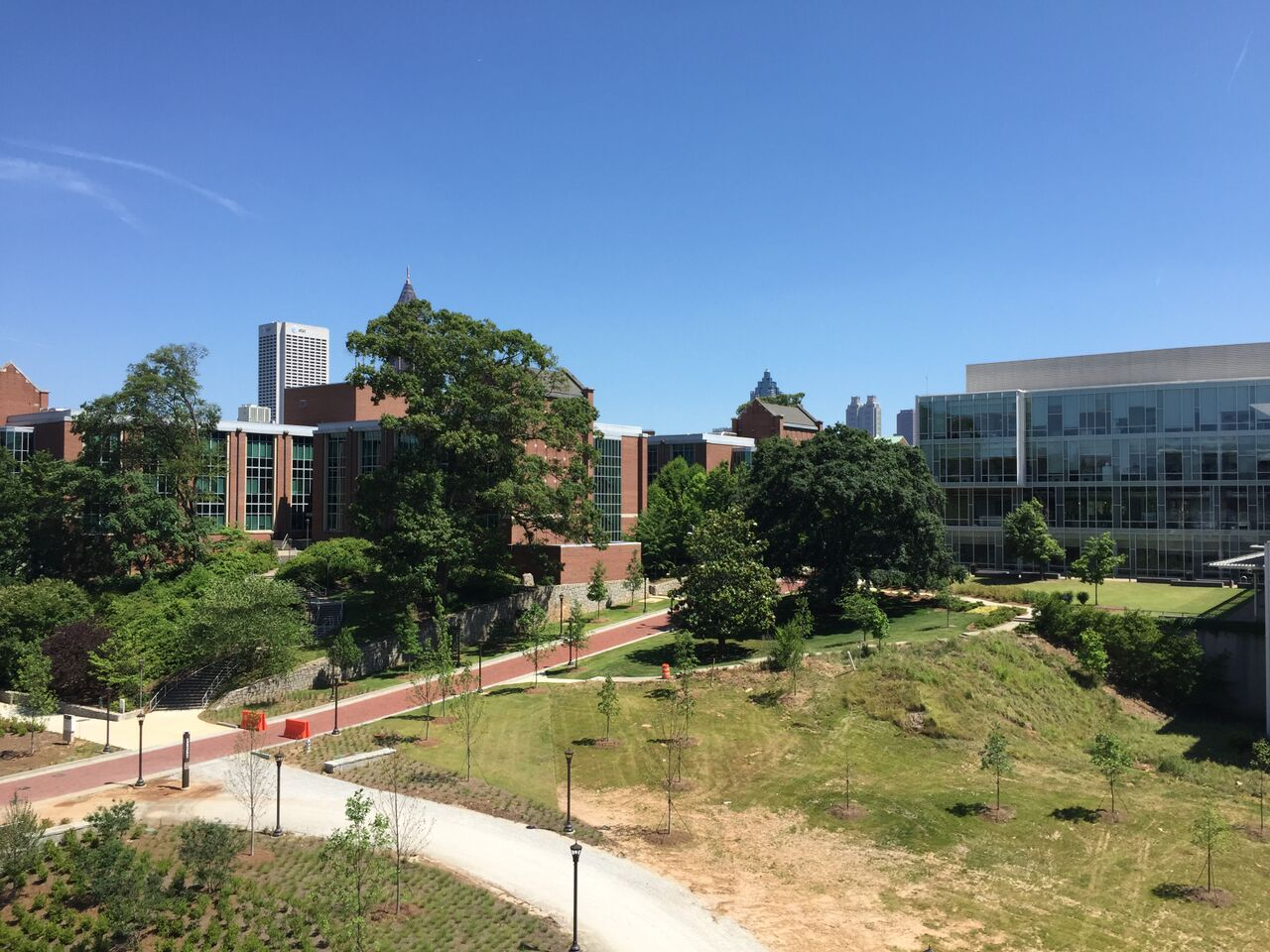
The former site of the Neely Nuclear Research Center
