= Rusty Roberts =

- Born: Russell Lee Roberts
- Education: West Point Georgia Institute of Technology Long Island University
- Scientific career
- Workplaces: United States Army Signal Corps; Georgia Tech Research Institute

Rusty Roberts is the director of the Aerospace, Transportation and Advanced Systems Laboratory (ATAS) at the Georgia Tech Research Institute, a position he has held since April 2009.

== Education ==
Roberts received a Bachelor of Science in electrical engineering from West Point in 1978, a Master of Science in electrical engineering from the Georgia Institute of Technology in 1985, and a master of business administration in finance from Long Island University in 1987.

== Career ==
Roberts started his career in the United States Army Signal Corps, where he spent 10 years. He then joined the Georgia Tech Research Institute in 1988 and spent 12 years as a program manager in the Systems Development Laboratory, which is now part of ATAS. Roberts was then the associate director for business development in GTRI's Information and Communications Laboratory for eight years, until his selection as director of ATAS.
