= ULTRA AP =

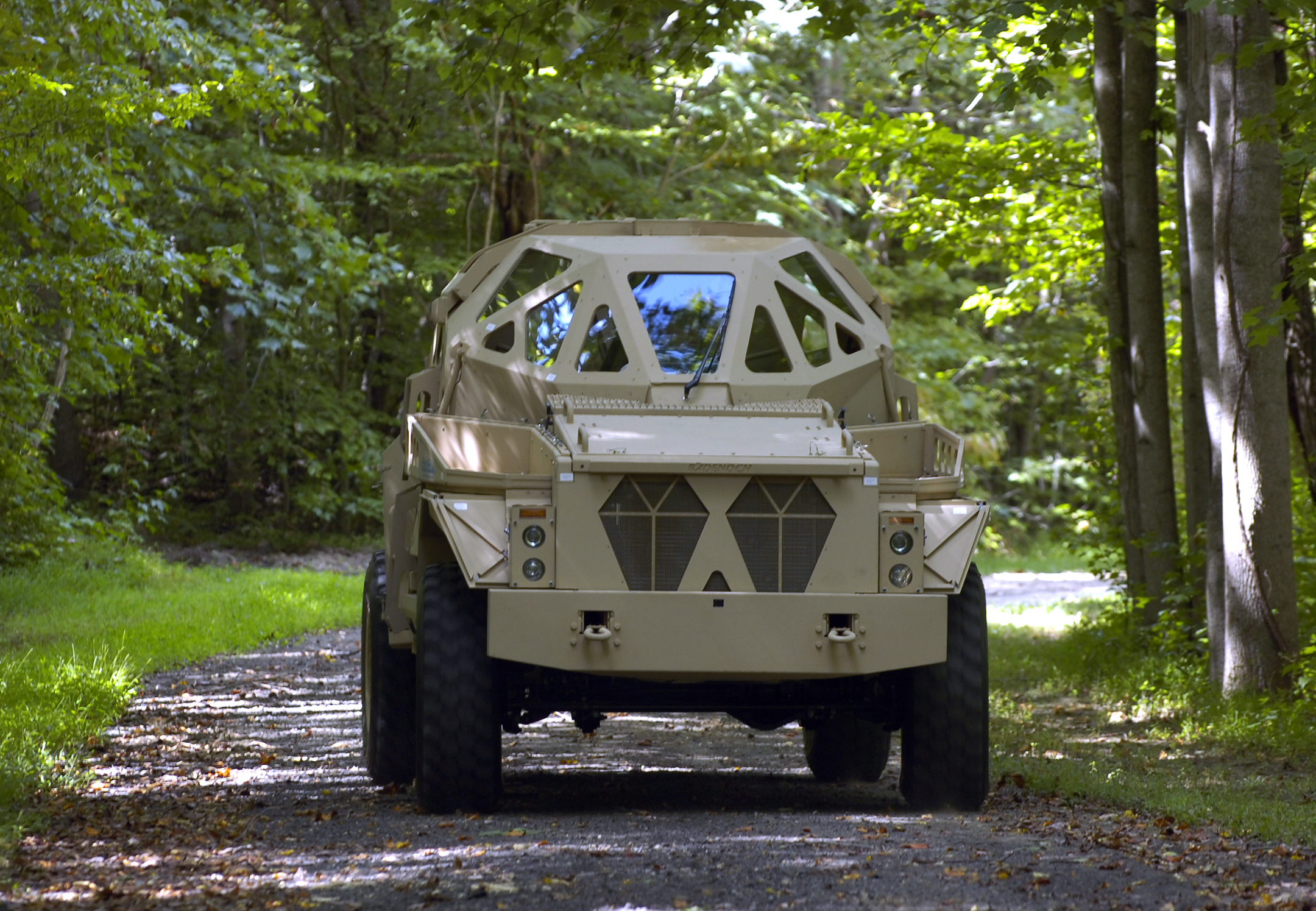

Overview
- Manufacturer: GTRI

Body and chassis
- Class: Concept automobile
- Body style: Armored truck

Powertrain
- Engine: 343 cu in (5.6 L) V8

Dimensions
- Wheelbase: 108 inches (2,743 mm)
- Length: 175 inches (4,445 mm)
- Width: 65.5 inches (1,664 mm)
- Curb weight: 8,900 lb (4,000 kg)

The ULTRA AP (Armored Patrol) is a concept combat vehicle that was unveiled in September 2005 by the Georgia Tech Research Institute, the applied research arm of the Georgia Institute of Technology, under contract from the Office of Naval Research. The Ultra AP was followed in 2009 by the ULTRA II, which was more focused on further developing the crew compartment.

The Ultra AP was reviewed in Rolling Stone magazine, Fortune Magazine, USA Today, and Car and Driver magazine other publications. Currently, the U.S. military and the Department of Defense was in the process of replacing the HMMWV or Humvee, because they were being fielded in situations they were not designed for, such as taking on small arms fire, rocket propelled grenades, and improvised explosive devices. The Ultra AP is a concept vehicle, and was not part of the Joint Light Tactical Vehicle program to replace the Humvee.

== Ultra AP ==
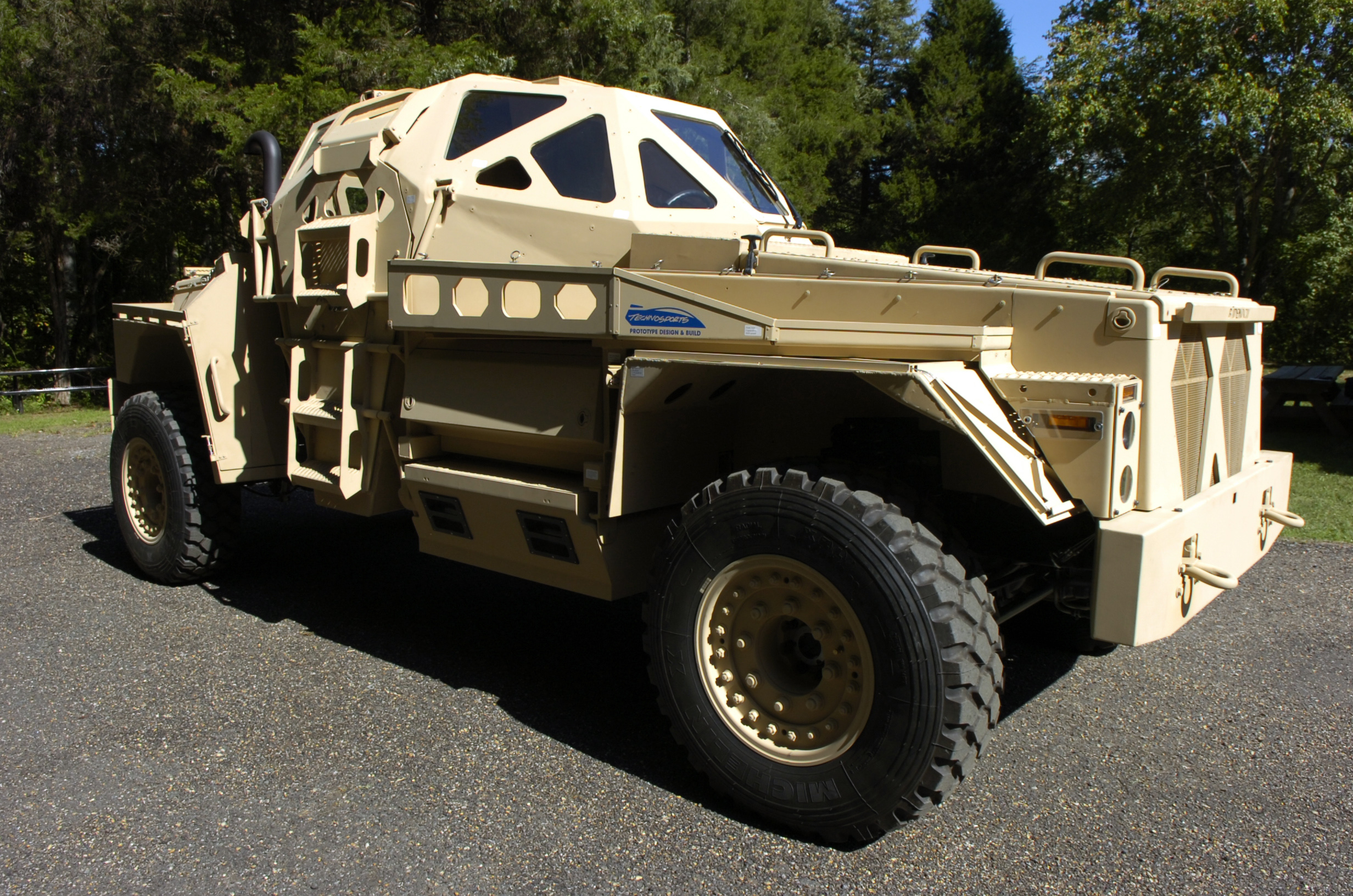

=== Features ===
The vehicle was built on the skeleton of a Ford F-350 truck, combining the safety features and maneuverability of a commercially available truck with advancements in blast-deflection technology and materials. This vehicle was built for the U.S. Military to showcase possible technology and safety improvements to the Humvee (HMMWV). The ULTRA AP weighs only 8,900 pounds, has fuel efficiency six times greater than a Humvee, and was designed and built within a matter of months. Ownership of the concept vehicle itself was transferred from the Office of Naval Research to the Georgia Tech Research Institute in February 2010 so that research could continue.

It features an egg-shaped crew capsule nicknamed the "blast bucket". It is shaped to deflect blasts and bullets and act as a roll-cage if the vehicle flips. The four occupants sit back to back in a diamond arrangement so that they can see hazards from all directions, a suggestion from troops in the field. It also moves the occupants away from the wheels, which are typically what sets off a land mine. The Ultra AP includes race car technology from NASCAR engineers like multipoint safety harnesses and shock-absorbing seats mounted on Skydex, which is used to cushion the outfield walls of baseball stadiums. It also uses the latest in bulletproof glass and the newest light-weight armor technology.

=== Development ===
In developing the ULTRA AP, GTRI's scientists and engineers assembled a team of industry professionals that included GTRI employee Scott Badenoch, who is now an advanced development and racing professional; Tom Moore, former vice president of Liberty Operations, Chrysler's advanced engineering center; Walt Wynbelt, former program executive officer with the U.S. Army Tank Automotive and Armaments Command, and Dave McLellan, former Corvette chief engineer for General Motors.

The ULTRA concept had its vehicle genesis on the US Army TARDEC COMBATT Program, sponsored by the National Automotive Center. This program explored the use of commercial vehicle platforms as a fundamental building block of more rugged military vehicles. Michael Dudzik (GTRI) and David McLellan were principals in the early transition of the COMBATT achievements to the ULTRA platform. ULTRA was able to build upon the COMBATT results and explore revolutionary designs in the integration of armor and chassis systems for increased survivability.

== Ultra II ==
The Georgia Tech Research Institute continued work on the project, eventually releasing the ULTRA II concept, also designed and tested for the Office of Naval Research. The new crew-protection concept builds on the earlier GTRI research on concepts for light armored vehicles. A blast test conducted with the Ultra II at the Aberdeen Test Center showed that the vehicle could protect its occupants from improvised explosive devices.

=== Features ===
The crew compartment was designed to fit six people: a driver and commander, facing forward, and two pairs behind them facing opposite sides of the vehicle. This design focuses on moving the crew away from external walls to reduce injury from side blasts, allows the blast-resistant seats to be frame-mounted, and reduces the time it takes to exit the vehicle. The crew compartment uses a "space frame" constructed from tubular steel, similar to the construction of off-road vehicles, especially those involved in off-road racing, and an armored steel skin provides structure and blast protection. Additional armor can be modularly bolted to the vehicle and easily reconfigured.

Another key focus of the project was the protection provided by a replaceable sacrificial "blast wedge" that is bolted to the bottom of the vehicle. Constructed from welded steel armor, it absorbs and deflects energy from a blast, acting as a crumple zone.

== See also ==
- GTRI Aerospace, Transportation and Advanced Systems Laboratory
- Desert Patrol Vehicle – (United States)
- Plasan Sand Cat – (Israel)
