= Robert McGrath =

American academic and administrator

Robert T. McGrath
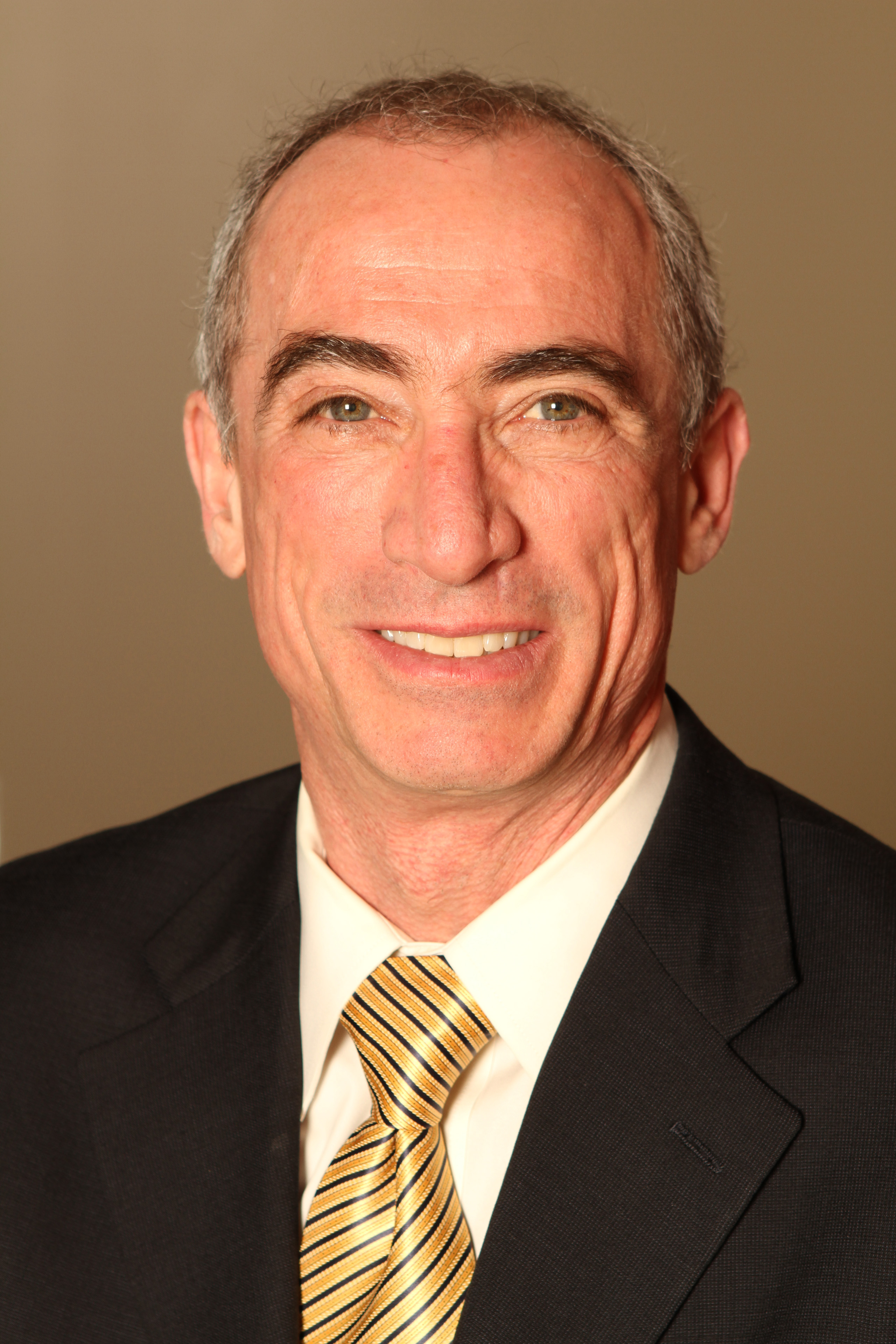
- Education: Pennsylvania State University; University of Michigan
- Known for: Promotion of STEM Education; Research Administrator
- Scientific career
- Workplaces: Georgia Institute of Technology, Georgia Tech Research Institute, Battelle Memorial Institute, National Renewable Energy Lab, Ohio State University, Penn State University

Robert "Bob" T. McGrath has served as educator, researcher and executive administrator at several major universities and national laboratories.

Between 1996 and 2008, Bob served as tenured Professor and Senior Vice President for Research at Ohio State and before that as tenured Professor and Associate Vice President for Research at Penn State. In these roles, Dr. McGrath led Research Strategic Planning, working extensively with faculty from Colleges of Science, Engineering, Social Sciences, Medicine, Biosciences, Arts & Humanities, Liberal Arts, Architecture, and Agriculture, to advance individual faculty scholarship as well as to develop Interdisciplinary Research Institutes that explored the boundaries of traditional college and departmental disciplines. At Penn State, he helped to establish and then served as inaugural Director of the Marine Corps Research University. Each University's reputation and sponsored research funding advanced dramatically, propelling Penn State and then Ohio State to be ranked among the top ten largest research programs in the nation during his tenure.

Bob has a strong track record of accomplishments working with federal agencies such as NSF, NIH, DOE, NASA, DoD, and DHS, as well as on R&D partnerships with industry, IP management, technology transfer, economic development and job creation. While at Ohio State, he worked extensively with Ohio's U.S. Congressional delegation, with Democratic and Republican Governors, and the Ohio Board of Regents. He was formally appointed by Ohio Governor Ted Strickland to serve on the Third Frontier Board managing the State's $2 billion technology-based investment fund for stimulating innovation and job creation. Leveraging against Third Frontier investments, Ohio State's industry funded R&D expenditures grew to over $120 million per year, surpassing MIT and Penn State, to make Ohio State at that time the nation's leading university in terms of industry sponsored R&D.

Dr. McGrath has also served in important administrative leadership roles such as Institutional Official for Human Subject Research Compliance, for Proper Care and Use of Research Animals, for the Ethical Conduct of Research, and for directing Grants & Contracts Offices annually supporting more than $800 million in government and industry sponsored R&D.

Early in his career (1984–1998), Bob served as researcher and then as Division/Program Manager at Sandia National Laboratories (SNL) with responsibilities for International Programs in Fusion Plasma-Materials Interactions and High Heat Flux Technologies; High Performance Computing Applications; Cooperative R&D with SEMATECH on microelectronics manufacturing; and other high priority programs. The SNL magnetic fusion R&D team led by Dr. McGrath made significant contributions to design, operation and diagnostics for tokamaks across the US and around the world, such as TFTR at the Princeton Plasma Physics Lab, DIII-D at General Atomics in San Diego, TEXTOR at Kernforschunganlage in Germany and the massive Tore Supra machine in Cadarache, France. Beginning in 1997, Bob was asked by the US DOE to serve as International Coordinator for Magnetic Fusion Plasma Facing Components, a role that served as template for international cooperation on magnetic fusion R&D between the US, the EU, Japan, Russa/the Former Soviet Union. Many of the technology innovations devised during this period are now being incorporated into the International Thermonuclear Experimental Reactor (ITER) being constructed in Cadarache, France.

In 2007–2009, Bob played an instrumental role in Battelle Memorial Institute's successful bid to Manage and Operate the National Renewable Energy Laboratory (NREL) in Golden, Colorado for the US Department of Energy. Bob served as that Laboratory's Deputy Director for all research programs during the award's formative phase. During this period, he helped to establish the Renewable and Sustainable Energy Institute (RASEI) as a research partnership between NREL and the University of Colorado Boulder.

In December 2010, Dr. McGrath was recruited to Georgia Tech, where he served as Senior Vice President, Professor, and Director of GTRI, the university's powerhouse defense sponsored R&D complex conducting high-tech research in electronic sensors, countermeasures, communications, quantum computing, and much more. During Dr. McGrath's tenure as Director, GTRI created over 500 new jobs, expanding its workforce to nearly 3,000 employees and its annual R&D expenditures to over $350M.

In 2015, after declining several overseas R&D leadership opportunities, Bob was recruited back to the University of Colorado and NREL to serve as RASEI Director, a position that he held until his retirement in 2021.

Dr. McGrath has contributed to the Nation's overall R&D Strategy by serving, for example, on the Defense Science Board's Strategic Planning Working Group for Technological Superiority in 2030, on the Secretary of Energy's Task Force for assessing National Laboratory management, investments and industry partnerships, or at various times representing his home institution on the management boards of NREL, Oak Ridge National Laboratory and Idaho National Laboratory.

Throughout his career, Dr. McGrath has been involved in STEM education. He has contributed to K-12 education programs, and has incorporated graduate student internships into all of the R&D programs for which he has been responsible.

McGrath earned a Ph.D. in nuclear science and engineering from the University of Michigan and earned undergraduate and graduate degrees from Penn State University in engineering sciences (BS), mathematics (MA) and physics (MS). He has authored more than 60 journal publications, more than 80 published abstracts & conference presentations and numerous technical reports, often in collaboration with the many of graduate students, postdoctoral fellows or junior researchers who have worked under his mentorship.

Bob and his wife Betsy have been married for over 40 years and are parents to two (now adult) daughters.

== Education ==
McGrath holds four degrees; three are from Pennsylvania State University, including a 1972 B.S. (Honors) in engineering sciences, a 1974 M.S. in physics, and a 1975 M.A. in mathematics. He also holds a 1980 Ph.D. from the University of Michigan in nuclear science and engineering.

== Research scientist ==
- From 1975 to 1976, McGrath was a Systems Engineer for HRB Singer, which is now a division of Raytheon. He worked on integrating situation awareness and command and control technology onto the USS John F. Kennedy (CV-67).
- From 1978 to 1983, he was a consultant, visiting researcher and graduate student intern at Pacific Northwest National Laboratory, Exxon Research and TRW.

From 1980 to 1984, McGrath was a visiting summer research scientist, specializing in fusion power, at Argonne National Laboratory. From July 1984 to February 1998, McGrath was a division manager, research and development program manager, and research scientist at Sandia National Laboratories.

== Educator ==
- From August 1980 to June 1984, McGrath was an assistant professor of engineering at Pennsylvania State University.
- From November 1996 to June 2004, he was a professor of engineering science. Since July 2004, McGrath has been an adjunct professor of engineering science.

== Administrator ==
- From September 1998 to June 2004, McGrath was the Associate Vice President for Research, Director of Strategic & Interdisciplinary Initiatives, and Director of the Marine Corps Research University at Penn State University.
- From July 2004 to July 2008 he was the Senior Vice President for Research at The Ohio State University.
- From February 2008 to March 2010, McGrath was the Deputy Laboratory Director for Science & Technology at the National Renewable Energy Laboratory (NREL) in Golden, Colorado.
- From April 2010 to January 2011, McGrath was on the leadership team of Battelle Memorial Institute.
- From February 2011 to October 2014, McGrath was the director of the Georgia Tech Research Institute and a vice president of the Georgia Institute of Technology.
- In October 2014, he accepted a position as senior vice president in the Office of the Executive Vice President for Research at Georgia Tech. In this role, he was responsible for developing major research partnerships for Georgia Tech, in particular with the United States Department of Energy national laboratories.
- During 2022, McGrath became Renewable and Sustainable Energy Institute Director.
