= Stephen E. Cross =

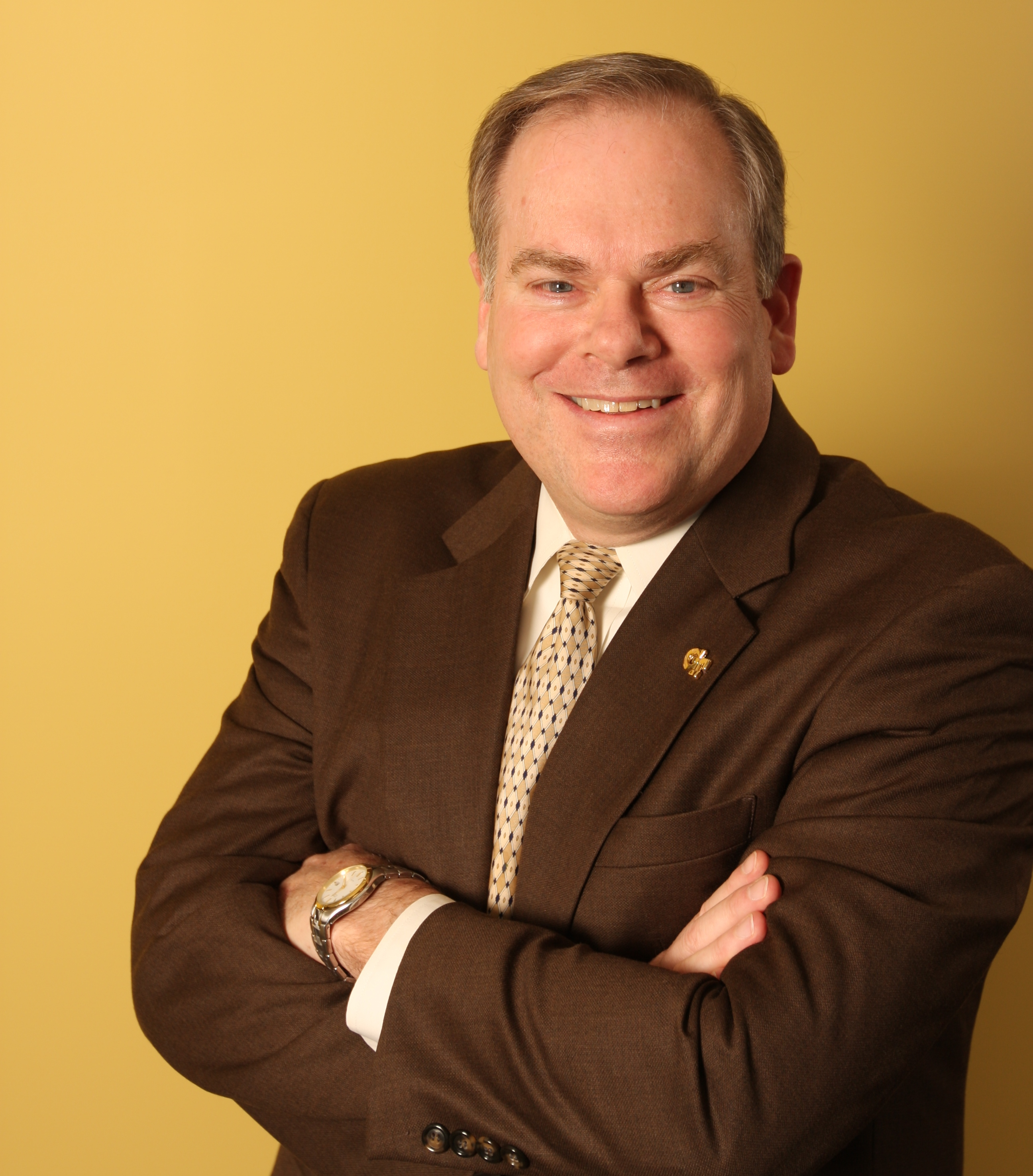
- Born: October 7, 1951 (age 75); United States
- Education: University of Cincinnati (1974); Air Force Institute of Technology (1977); University of Illinois (1983)
- Awards: Defense Superior Service Medal (1991); University of Cincinnati College of Engineering Distinguished Alumnus (2002); IEEE Fellow (2003) Irish America Star of the South (2010)
- Scientific career
- Fields: Software engineering Systems engineering Process improvement Technology transfer
- Workplaces: Georgia Institute of Technology; Carnegie Mellon University
- Doctoral advisor: David Waltz

Stephen Edward Cross is the executive vice president for research (EVPR) at the Georgia Institute of Technology (Georgia Tech), a position to which he was appointed in 2010. As EVPR, Cross coordinates research efforts among Georgia Tech's colleges, research units and faculty; and provides central administration for all research, economic development and related support units at Georgia Tech. This includes direct oversight of Georgia Tech's interdisciplinary research institutes, the Georgia Tech Research Institute (GTRI), the Enterprise Innovation Institute (EI^{2}) and the Georgia Tech Research Corporation (GTRC).

Prior to this position, he served as director of the Georgia Tech Research Institute from 2003 until 2010, director and chief executive officer of Carnegie Mellon's Software Engineering Institute from 1994 to 2003, and an officer in the United States Air Force from 1974 to 1994.

He is an IEEE Fellow, a former editor-in-chief of IEEE Intelligent Systems and former associate editor of the Journal of Information, Knowledge, and Systems Management. He is a recipient of the Defense Superior Service Medal. Cross has published more than 60 research papers in computing, and has provided expert testimony to the United States Congress.

== Education and Air Force ==
Cross attended Madison High School in Madison, Ohio, from 1965 to 1969. Cross earned a Bachelor of Science in Electrical Engineering from the University of Cincinnati in 1974 and subsequently joined the United States Air Force. While in the Air Force, he received a Master of Science in Electrical Engineering from the Air Force Institute of Technology in 1977 and a Ph.D. from the University of Illinois at Urbana–Champaign in 1983. Cross also graduated from United States Air Force Test Pilot School's Flight Test Engineer Program, the Air War College, and the National Defense University.

While in the Air Force, Cross wrote embedded software for F-15s and F-16s. His experience also touched on software for cruise missile navigation, logistics, and air traffic control. Cross was a program manager for the Defense Advanced Research Projects Agency (DARPA) from 1989 to 1994; he was also a member and chairman of DARPA's Information Science & Technology panel. He retired from the Air Force in 1994.

== Academic career ==
In 1994, Cross joined the faculty of Carnegie Mellon in Pittsburgh, Pennsylvania, becoming a principal research scientist in its Robotics Institute and Institute for Software Research. In 1996, he became director and CEO of Carnegie Mellon's Software Engineering Institute. While at Carnegie Mellon, Cross promoted more reliable software development practices such as code reuse.

In late 2003, Cross was chosen to serve as director of the Georgia Tech Research Institute, an applied research arm of the Georgia Institute of Technology. He is also a professor in Georgia Tech's School of Industrial and Systems Engineering and an adjunct professor in the College of Computing and the Scheller College of Business. Cross was appointed Georgia Tech's executive vice president of research in 2010, assuming the position on May 1, 2010. In June 2012, Cross and David S. Stephens (vice president for research of the Robert W. Woodruff Health Sciences Center) published an op-ed in the Atlanta Journal-Constitution supporting biomedical research.

== Memberships and awards ==
In 2010, Secretary of Defense Robert M. Gates named Cross to a three-year term on the Defense Science Board. Cross previously served on the Defense Science Board's Task Force on Defense Software. While at Georgia Tech, Cross has joined several research advisory boards, including the Health Systems Institute, the Parker H. Petit Institute for Bioengineering and Bioscience, the Strategic Energy Initiative and the Tennenbaum Institute.

Cross is a member of the Institute of Electrical and Electronics Engineers (IEEE); he was named an IEEE Fellow in 2003 "for the development and use of modern software engineering techniques in advanced systems". He was editor-in-chief of IEEE Intelligent Systems from 1994 to 1997, and associate editor of the Journal of Information, Knowledge, and Systems Management from 2003 to 2011. In 1991, Cross was awarded the Defense Superior Service Medal; in 2002, he was named a University of Cincinnati College of Engineering Distinguished Alumnus; and in 2010, Irish America magazine named him a Star of the South.

== Selected publications ==
- Cross, Stephen (2012). "A Case Study of a Research University's Role in Supporting an Innovation Ecosystem". Proceedings of the 2nd Annual International Conference on Innovation and Entrepreneurship: 48–52. ISSN 2251-2039.
- Weiss, Lora; Roberts, Rusty; Cross, Stephen (September 2009). "The System Engineering and Test (TSET) Approach for Unprecedented Systems" (PDF). Journal of the International Test and Evaluation Association. 30. International Test and Evaluation Association: 386–394.
- Cross, Stephen (2005). Rouse, William; Boff, Kenneth (eds.). "Using Organization Simulation to Develop Unprecedented Systems". Organizational Simulation from Modeling and Simulation to Games and Entertainment. John Wiley & Sons: 37–54.
- Cross, Stephen (2002). "Reflections on the Process Revolution". In Reifer, Donald (ed.). Tutorial on Software Management (6th ed.). IEEE Computer Society Press. pp. 77–90. ISBN 0-7695-1100-7.
