= Edward K. Reedy =

American engineer (born 1940)

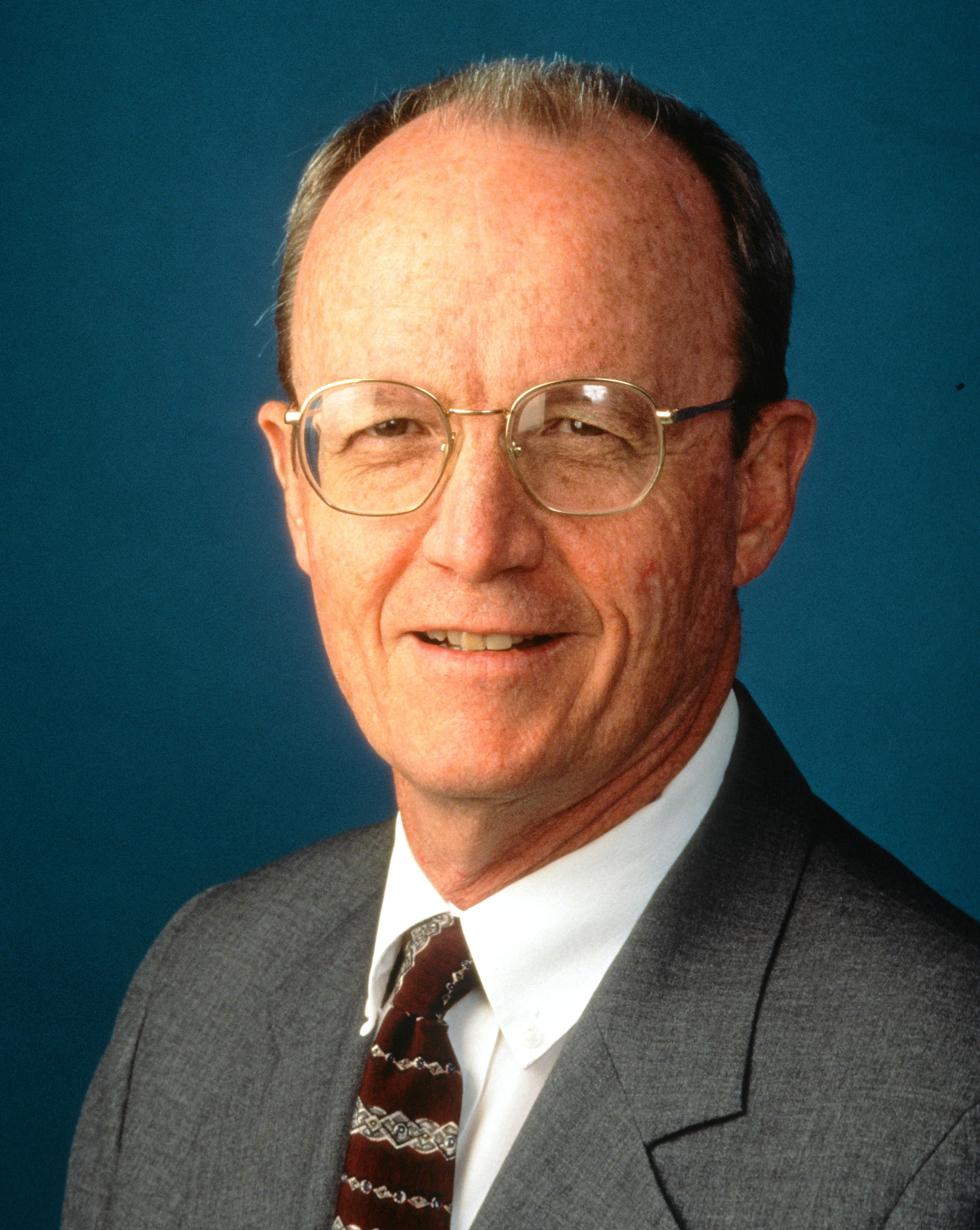
- Born: April 22, 1940; Johnson City, Tennessee, U.S.
- Education: University of Tennessee
- Known for: Work in radar system development and electromagnetic scattering
- Awards: IEEE Third Millennium Medal; Honorary alumnus of Georgia Tech
- Scientific career
- Workplaces: United States Army Reserve; Georgia Tech Research Institute
- Doctoral advisor: J. Frank Pierce

Edward K. Reedy (born April 22, 1940) was the director of the Georgia Tech Research Institute (GTRI) from 1998 to 2003, and correspondingly a vice president of the Georgia Institute of Technology. He first joined GTRI in 1970, and specialized in radar system development and electromagnetic scattering. Reedy held a variety of research and leadership positions within the organization, including the head of Research Operations and four years as associate director.

== Early life and education ==
Reedy was born in Johnson City, Tennessee on April 22, 1940. He attended high school at Boones Creek High School. Reedy received a Bachelor of Science in 1963, a Master of Science in 1964 and a Ph.D. in 1968 in electrical engineering, all from the University of Tennessee.

== Career ==
Reedy was in the United States Army Reserve for 21 years, which included two years (1968-1970) as a captain (Signal Corps Officer) at the Communications Electronics Command in Fort Monmouth, New Jersey.

In 1970, Reedy joined the Georgia Tech Research Institute as a junior research engineer. Reedy steadily progressed through the ranks; from 1974 to 1975, he was the head of the Systems Technology Branch; from 1975 to 1977 he was the Chief of the Radar Application Division; and from 1977 to 1990 (13 years) he was the director of GTRI's Radar and Instrumentation Laboratory. In 1990, he became a Laboratory Group Director, where he was responsible for approximately half of the organization. From 1993 to 1997, Reedy was the associate director of GTRI and director of research operations. Reedy has been an adjunct professor for Georgia Tech's School of Electrical and Computer Engineering since 1987.

After GTRI director Richard Truly's departure in March 1997 to become director of the National Renewable Energy Laboratory, Reedy served as interim director for eight months, and was subsequently named director of GTRI. As director, Reedy was particularly influential in securing the $7.3 million in funding required to build the Food Processing Technology Building. Under his leadership, GTRI's first endowed chair was established in March 1998 in honor of Glen P. Robinson, the $1.5 million Glen P. Robinson Chair in Electro-Optics. GTRI and Georgia Tech played host to sitting president George W. Bush in March 2002, and demonstrated new technologies in a simulated disaster. In 2003, Reedy retired from the GTRI directorship after 33 years at the organization and seven as director. Reedy currently works part-time for the GTRI Sensors and Electromagnetic Applications Laboratory and as an independent consultant.

== Memberships and honors ==
Reedy is an IEEE member, and was named an IEEE Fellow in 1991 "for technical leadership and contributions to developing and exploiting the millimeter wavelengths in radar applications". In 1995, he was the president of IEEE Aerospace and Electronic Systems Society. From 1998 to 2000, Reedy served on IEEE's national board and was Director of Division IX. In addition, Reedy has served on numerous IEEE committees including the IEEE Technical Activities Board (1995 to 2001). In 2000, he received the IEEE Third Millennium Medal. Since 2002, he has been on the IEEE Strategic Planning Committee, and since 2004, he has been on the selection committee for the IEEE Dennis J. Picard Medal for Radar Technologies and Applications. Reedy is currently Executive Chair of the 2012 IEEE Aerospace and Electronic Systems Society Radar Conference, RadarCon.

Reedy was on the Army Science Board for two three-year terms, from 1993 to 1996 and 1999 to 2005, and served on a Tri-Service Panel led by the Naval Research Advisory Committee to study the "Science and Technology Community in Crisis". In 2004, he was named an honorary alumnus of the Georgia Institute of Technology.

== Selected publications ==
=== Books ===
- Eaves, Jerry L.; Reedy, Edward K (1987). Principles of Modern Radar. Van Nostrand Reinhold Company. ISBN 0-442-22104-5.

=== Book chapters ===
- Reedy, Edward K.; Cassaday, W. L. (1994). "Millimeter Radar: Current Assessment, Future Directions". Millimeter and Microwave Engineering for Communications and Radar. Vol. CR54. SPIE Press. pp. 243–273. ISBN 0-8194-1505-7.
- Reedy, Edward K.; Wiltse, J. C. (1988). "Fundamentals of Millimeter-Wave (MMW) Radar Systems". In Brookner, Eli (ed.). Aspects of Modern Radar. Artech House. ISBN 1-58053-128-8.
- Reedy, Edward K. (1987). "Fundamentals of Millimeter-Wave Radar Systems". In Brown, Charles E (ed.). Principles and Applications of Millimeter-Wave Radar. Artech House. ISBN 0-89006-202-1.
- Reedy, Edward K.; Ewell, G. W. (1981). "Millimeter Radar". In Button, Kenneth J; Wiltse, James C (eds.). Infrared and Millimeter Waves. Vol. 4. Academic Press. ISBN 0-12-147704-5.
