= GTRI Cyber Technology and Information Security Laboratory =

Cybersecurity, Information Protection, and Hardware Evaluation Research Laboratory
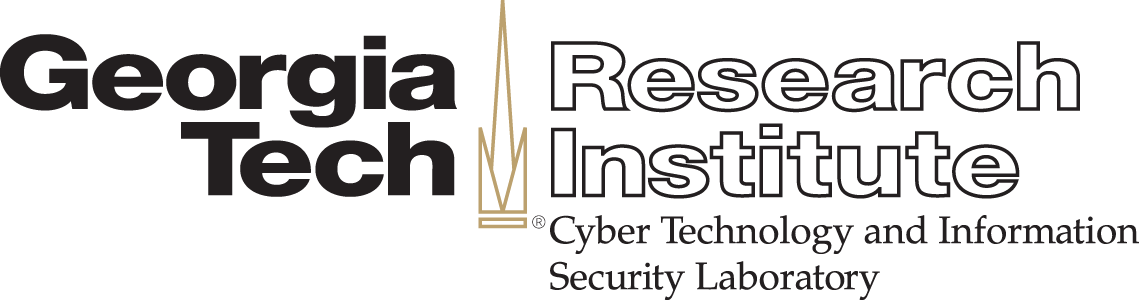
- Company type: Nonprofit
- Industry: Information security, network vulnerabilities, information systems, mission assurance, cyberwarfare
- Headquarters: Atlanta, Georgia, USA
- Key people: Alexa Harter; Laboratory Director
- Number of employees: 250
- Parent: Georgia Tech Research Institute
- Website: www.gtri.gatech.edu/cipher

The Cybersecurity, Information Protection, and Hardware Evaluation Research Laboratory (CIPHER) is one of eight labs in the Georgia Tech Research Institute. It was created on October 1, 2010 and focuses on cyber security. Along with the GTRI Information and Communications Laboratory, it is part of the Information and Cyber Sciences directorate. GTRI CIPHER is known for its commitment to Open Source Software It will feature existing business areas such as secure information systems and resilient command and control with emerging areas such as cyberwarfare. The laboratory will additionally be a part of the Georgia Tech Information Security Center.
