= Paul K. Calaway =

American chemical engineer

- Born: March 31, 1910; Bethesda, Arkansas
- Died: October 31, 1993 (aged 83)
- Education: Arkansas College Georgia Institute of Technology University of Texas at Austin
- Scientific career
- Workplaces: Georgia Tech Research Institute

Paul Kenneth Calaway (March 31, 1910 - October 31, 1993) was an American chemical engineer and the director of the Georgia Tech Research Institute from 1954 to 1957.

== Education ==
Born in Bethesda, Arkansas, Calaway received a Bachelor of Arts degree from Arkansas College, a Master of Science from Georgia Institute of Technology in 1933, and a Ph.D. from the University of Texas.

== Career ==
After completing his doctorate, Calaway returned to Georgia Tech to teach chemistry, often teaching classes in explosives. Calaway also spent time developing replacements for quinine, the anti-Malaria drug.

As an associate professor of chemistry, he won Georgia Tech's first-ever Sigma Xi Research Prize for his paper "The Tolymercaptopropanones and their Condensation with Isatins" in 1947, which was published in the Journal of the American Chemical Society in January 1947. Calaway was inducted into Omicron Delta Kappa on May 25, 1952.

From 1954 to 1957, Calaway was the director of the Georgia Tech Research Institute, then known as the Engineering Experiment Station. In 1957, he returned to teaching.
