= GTRI Information and Communications Laboratory =

Lab in the Georgia Tech Research Institute

Information and Communications Laboratory
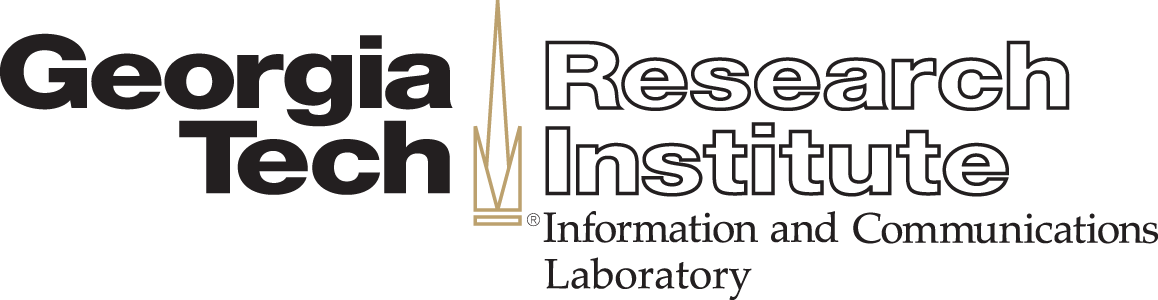
- Company type: Nonprofit
- Industry: Computer science, information technology, communications, networking
- Headquarters: Atlanta, Georgia, USA
- Key people: Daniel Browne; Lab Director
- Parent: Georgia Tech Research Institute
- Website: www.gtri.gatech.edu/icl

The Information and Communications Laboratory (ICL) is one of eight labs in the Georgia Tech Research Institute. Along with the GTRI Cyber Technology and Information Security Laboratory, it is part of the Information and Cyber Sciences directorate. It conducts a broad range of research in areas of computer science, information technology, communications, networking, and the development of commercial products from university research.

== Research areas ==
ICL conducts research that solves complex problems involving information processing, storage, representation and exchange; Internet and database technologies and applications; information security and assurance; along with privacy, knowledge management, data visualization, mapping/geographical information, distributed simulation and enterprise information systems. ICL is responsible for the development and maintenance of FalconView.

Researchers work in broadband telecommunications, wireless access systems, multimedia information systems, tactical communications, communications surveillance and disruption, information warfare and assurance, and technology assessment, application integration, and software radio systems.

The GTRI Office of Policy Analysis and Research interprets the public policy aspects of technology, particularly where it is relevant to GTRI's applied research efforts. Specifically, OPAR examines the public policy aspects of technology under development at GTRI and analyzes decisions made in the policy arena that pertain to GTRI's research and development.

ICL also provides C4I capabilities and functional requirements analysis to various service components across the Department of Defense in Northern and Eastern Virginia.
