= OPAR L'Orientale Open Archive =

OPAR L'Orientale Open Archive is the institutional repository of the University of Naples "L'Orientale", designed according to the Berlin Declaration on Open Access to Knowledge in Science and Humanities and the Messina Declaration ratified by CRUI in 2004. OPAR L'Orientale Open Archive is a digital repository, accessible to all. Registered users can deposit different items: articles, technical reports, Ph.D. theses, books, working papers and preprints, articles already appeared in journals, conference papers and chapters from books already published, training aid, dataset and more.

Since 2001, the Budapest Open Access Initiative promotes the free availability or research articles in all academic fields and concerns a growing number of individuals and organizations from around the world who represent researchers, universities, laboratories, libraries, foundations, journals, publishers, learned societies, and kindred open-access initiatives.
