= GTRI Electro-Optical Systems Laboratory =

Electro-Optical Systems Laboratory
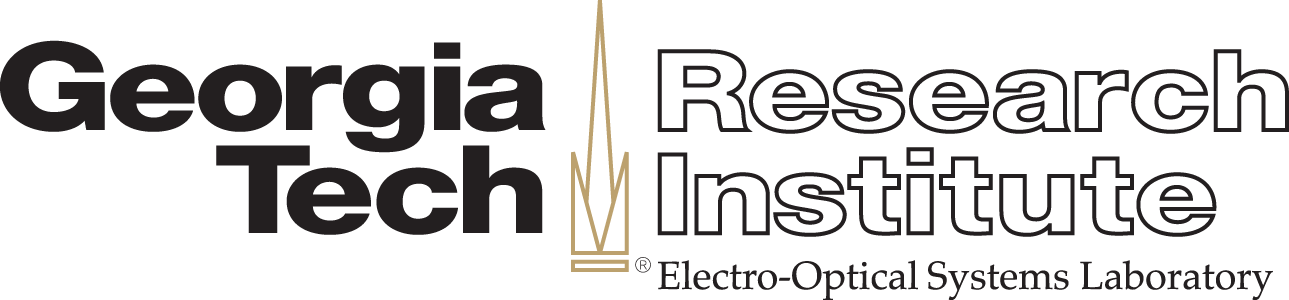
- Company type: Nonprofit
- Industry: Electro-optical systems, nanotechnology, microelectronics
- Headquarters: Atlanta, Georgia, USA
- Key people: Terence Haran; Laboratory Director; Chris Valenta; Ph.D., P.E., SM-IEEE
- Parent: Georgia Tech Research Institute
- Website: www.gtri.gatech.edu/eosl

The Electro-Optical Systems Laboratory is one of eight labs in the Georgia Tech Research Institute and one of three labs under the Electronics, Optics, and Systems directorate. It conducts basic and applied research into electro-optical topics and supports electro-optical education at the university level.

EOSL develops technology in the areas of electro-optical modeling and analysis, nanotechnology, microelectronics and phosphor development, remote sensing, acoustics, and mechanical systems. EOSL has numerous technology areas of preeminence that include LIDAR systems development, hyperspectral and multispectral imaging, ultraviolet/infrared stimulator development, countermeasures technology, microelectronics, and electro-optical modeling and analysis.

== Research areas ==
The research activities extend to carbon nanotubes; RFID; advanced container security development; optical tagging and tracking technology; measurement data collection, analysis, and dissemination; atmospheric modeling; geospatial information systems and analysis; and human vision modeling. The laboratory has been heavily involved in the development of geographic information system databases and advanced rendering techniques to include modeling of various backgrounds in the ultraviolet to infrared portions of the spectrum.

== Research centers ==
Research centers within EOSL include the following:

- The military sensing information analysis center (SENSIAC) serves the military sensor community as a repository of information, provider of symposia and specific technical tasks related to sensing technology.
- The Landmarc research center provides multi-discipline technological research and development for complex systems, focusing on personal captioning, location-based services, and other mobile and wireless solutions.
- The National Guard Technology Program Office provides unbiased and quick solutions to support domestic operational missions for the National Guard.
- The Phosphor Technology Center of Excellence (PTCOE) is involved in the research and development of light-emitting materials, devices, and displays.
- The Center for Geographic Information Systems (CGIS) researches and develops next-generation geospatial technologies and supports multi-disciplinary GIS education.

== Location ==
The GTRI EOSL labs are located on Georgia Tech campus.
