= Thomas E. Stelson =

American civil engineer (1928–2005)

- Born: August 24, 1928; Ohio
- Died: November 13, 2005 (aged 77); Atlanta, Georgia
- Education: Carnegie-Mellon University
- Scientific career
- Fields: Civil engineering
- Workplaces: Carnegie-Mellon University; Georgia Institute of Technology; Georgia Tech Research Institute

Thomas Eugene Stelson (August 24, 1928 – November 13, 2005) was an American civil engineer. He was the Vice President for Research at the Georgia Institute of Technology from 1974 to 1988 and Executive Vice President (Provost) of the Institute from 1988 until 1990 when he left Georgia Tech to become a founding administrator at Hong Kong University of Science and Technology. Stelson also served as the interim director of the Georgia Tech Research Institute from 1975 to 1976. He took a leave of absence from Georgia Tech to serve as Assistant Secretary for Conservation and Solar Energy for the Carter Administration from 1980 to 1984.

== Carnegie Mellon ==
Stelson graduated from Carnegie Mellon University in 1949, 1950, and 1952.

Stelson eventually became head of Carnegie Mellon's Civil Engineering department. In 1967, the Silver Bridge failed, and NBC News hired Stelson to inspect the pieces days later; his more detailed findings were eventually published in Popular Science.

== Georgia Tech and Carter Administration ==
Stelson was the Vice President for Research at the Georgia Institute of Technology from 1974 to 1988, where he emphasized the importance of basic research, applied research, and academics, given that the relative merits of each formed somewhat of a longstanding cultural war at the school. An increased focus on research activities allowed more funding for academics, which allowed the school's ranking to start a long and continuing rise from the 20s. Stelson simultaneously served as the interim director of the Georgia Tech Research Institute from 1975 to 1976, during which time he reorganized the station into eight semi-autonomous laboratories in order to allow each to develop a specialization and clientele, a model it retains (with slight modifications) to this day.

Stelson served on the board of the MTS Systems Corporation from 1979 until at least 1994. He took a leave of absence from Georgia Tech to serve as Assistant Secretary for Conservation and Solar Energy for the Carter Administration from 1980 to 1984.

In 1988, Stelson endowed the Stelson Lecture Series, named for his mathematician father, Hugh Stelson. From 1988 to 1990, Stelson was the Executive Vice President (Provost) of the Institute. Stelson had hoped to become the next president of Georgia Tech, but John Patrick Crecine was selected instead. Under Crecine, Stelson helped with a dramatic and controversial reorganization of Georgia Tech into five colleges. During Stelson's tenure at Georgia Tech, annual research spending grew from $8 million in 1974 (equivalent to $52,226,721 as of 2025) to $122 million in 1990 (equivalent to $300,649,516 as of 2025).

== Later career ==
In 1990, Stelson left Georgia Tech to become a founding administrator (vice president for research and development) at Hong Kong University of Science and Technology. Stelson held that position until 1994, whereupon he became an independent engineering consultant. He died on November 13, 2005, from complications from brain surgery.
