= GTRI Applied Systems Laboratory =

Applied Systems Laboratory
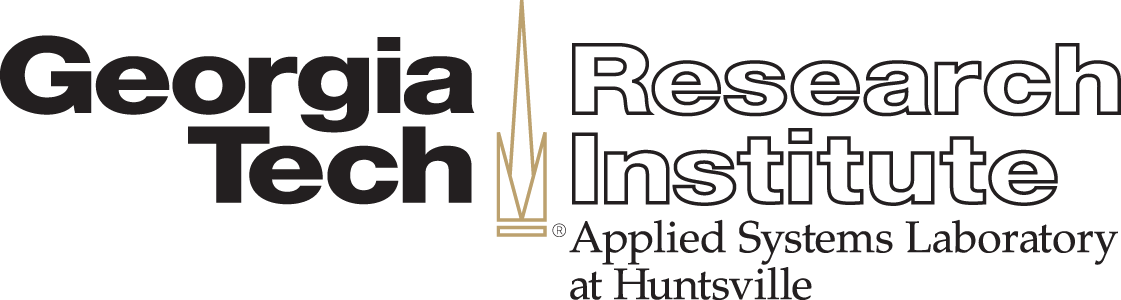
- Company type: Nonprofit
- Industry: command and control and missile defense simulation and analysis
- Headquarters: Huntsville, Alabama, USA
- Key people: Barry Bullard; Laboratory Director
- Parent: Georgia Tech Research Institute
- Website: www.gtri.gatech.edu/asl

The Applied Systems Laboratory (ASL) is one of eight labs in the Georgia Tech Research Institute and one of three labs under the Electronics, Optics, and Systems directorate. This laboratory, located in Huntsville, Alabama, primarily supports the U.S. Army Aviation and Missile Research, Development and Engineering Center (USA AMRDEC) in its aviation and missile R&D efforts.

== Research Areas ==
The laboratory’s multi-disciplinary research skills include battlefield command and control simulation and analysis, analysis and modeling of complete air & missile defense systems, sensor and fuze simulation and analysis and aviation mission planning software engineering. Other research involves field and hardware-in-the-loop testing of air defense weapons equipment, wargaming and force-on-force simulations, guidance and control simulations, and tactical software development.
