= GTRI Office of Policy Analysis and Research =

Think tank at the Georgia Tech Research Institute

Office of Policy Analysis and Research
- Type: Nonprofit
- Industry: Policy analysis
- Founded: 2004
- Headquarters: Atlanta, Georgia, USA
- Key people: Marlit Hayslett; OPAR Director
- Parent: Georgia Tech Research Institute
- Website: www.opar.gtri.gatech.edu

The GTRI Office of Policy Analysis and Research is a division of the Georgia Tech Research Institute that focuses on policy analysis, particularly in fields where GTRI has science and technology experience. OPAR assists the Georgia General Assembly and publishes briefs on relevant issues, including how other states treat various issues.

In particular, OPAR hosts an annual "Legislative Roundtable" that brings together interested state representatives, prominent members of Georgia industry, and Georgia Tech students and faculty.
