= FalconView =

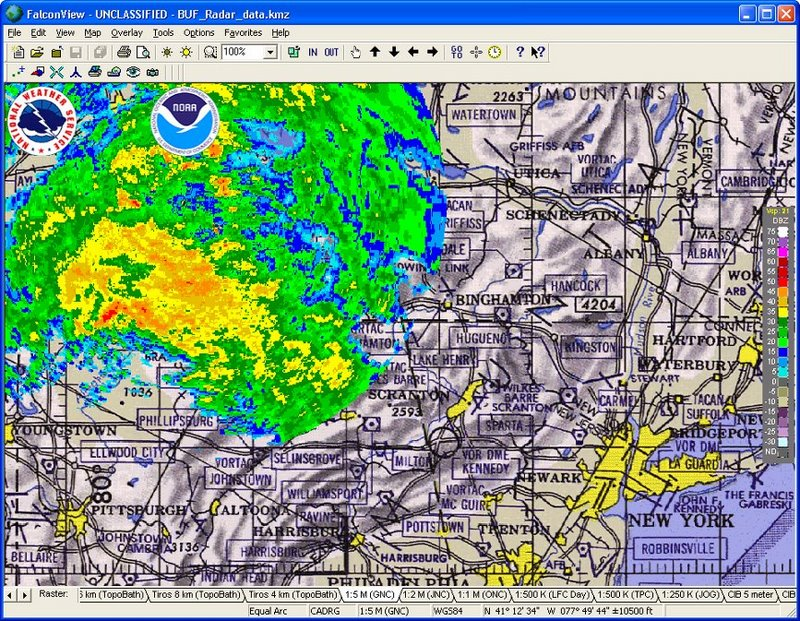
- FalconView Screen Capture Showing Weather Radar from KMZ
- Developer: Georgia Tech Research Institute
- Initial release: 1994
- Written in: C++
- Operating system: Windows, iOS, Android, Linux
- Available in: English
- Type: Geographic information system
- License: Government off-the-shelf, GNU Lesser General Public License
- Website: www.falconview.org

FalconView is a mapping system created by the Georgia Tech Research Institute. It was initially developed for the Windows family of operating systems; however, versions for Linux and mobile operating systems are under development. It displays various types of maps and geographically referenced overlays. Many types of maps are supported, but the primary ones of interest to most users are aeronautical charts, satellite images and elevation maps. FalconView also supports a large number of overlay types that can be displayed over any map background. The current overlay set is targeted toward military mission planning users and is oriented towards aviators and aviation support personnel.

FalconView is an integral part of the Portable Flight Planning Software (PFPS). This software suite includes FalconView, Combat Flight Planning Software (CFPS), Combat Weapon Delivery Software (CWDS), Combat Air Drop Planning Software (CAPS) and several other software packages built by various software contractors. Current work includes the development of FalconView as part of XPlan, the Department of Defense's most recent mission planning system. The Joint Mission Planning System is also being added to FalconView as a plugin. The program has an active user community, and the Georgia Tech Research Institute plans events supporting the program.

== History ==
=== Air National Guard ===
Development of FalconView began in 1993 by the Georgia Tech Research Institute after they were contracted by the Air National Guard (ANG) to create a mapping package that would run on a personal computer and be easier to use than the existing UNIX-based system. According to John Pyles, the head of the initial FalconView development team, the idea for the project came from then-Captain Bobby Sandford, a fighter pilot in the Air National Guard. The software was named for the F-16 Fighting Falcon, the full name of the fighter flown by Sandford. Georgia Tech Research Institute had previously developed mapping applications as part of the Micro Fix and the FORSCOM Automated Intelligence Support System (FAISS) programs for the United States Army. The initial development was performed under an Army Research Lab contract. The combination of FalconView and the Combat Flight Planning Software (CFPS) which was being developed by the USAF 46th Test Squadron and TYBRIN Corp became the Portable Flight Planning Software (PFPS). The first version of FalconView was completed in 1994. The software ran on MS-DOS, with a version for Windows 3.1 released not long after.

The initial versions of FalconView were simply a set of routines to display scanned raster maps such as CADRG (compressed arc digital raster graphics) with simple stick routes drawn on top, but the easy to use software was popular with the end users and more functionality was added. Each additional feature was developed with significant input from the user community and improved with feedback from a group of beta testers. Unlike most other DoD-developed applications, the FalconView development team was given very general requirements by the ANG which were fleshed out into a product by the development team and mission planners who used the software for their daily activities. Development and improvement of FalconView features is still strongly driven by its user community.

=== Additional sponsors ===
In the early years the software was distributed to other services from user to user because it made their jobs easier. As the program matured, United States Special Operations Command adopted PFPS and added capabilities such as the Moving Map functionality (ability to have the map scroll and rotate based on the position information received from a connected GPS navigation device) and helicopter support. In 1997, the United States Air Force adopted the Portable Flight Planning Software into the Air Force Mission Support System (AFMSS) program, followed by the first Navy release in 1998 and an Army release in 2002. Each adopter of the software has funded new functionality to the program and a corresponding expansion of its ability to interact with other systems.

Version 3.2, released in 2002, added significant third party programmer support to FalconView. As a result, many new applications were developed by other government program offices and end users who used Visual Basic to automate tasks for their specific needs FalconView supports a set of programmer interfaces which allow applications to fuse their information into a single picture of the user's area of interest. The users know that data produced on FalconView can be shared with other branches of the armed services and coalition partners who have PFPS through the Foreign Military Sales Program.

=== Open-source software ===
Because the federal government has funded the development of FalconView, it is a nonproprietary "government off-the-shelf" (GOTS) application and is free of any license fees for government use. This includes the use of the Software Developers Kit (SDK) which documents the interfaces for use by government developers and contractors working on government programs.

In late 2008, Georgia Tech was funded to develop and deploy an open-source software (OSS) version of FalconView. The OSS version of FalconView includes most of the functionality of the GOTS system, excluding only a few overlays considered to be exclusively related to military mission planning. Georgia Tech posted the first alpha version of FalconView as open source in June 2009.

=== Multi-platform support ===
In 2014, two new editions of FalconView, FalconView 3-D and FalconView Mobile were announced. FalconView 3-D improves support for surface missions, and FalconView Mobile brings the core capabilities of FalconView 2-D and 3-D to the iOS and Android mobile platforms. A Linux version of the software is also being developed.

== Honors and awards ==
The FalconView development team at the Georgia Tech Research Institute received the National Security Award on December 12, 2011.
