= Georgia Tech Research Institute =

Nonprofit applied research arm

Coordinates: 33.781093°N 84.400421°W

- GTRI logo
- Formation: Atlanta, Georgia (1934)
- Founder: W. Harry Vaughan
- Type: Nonprofit
- Purpose: Research and development Engineering; Science; Economics; Public policy Defense
- Location: Atlanta, Georgia, USA
- Key people: Michael "Mike" Gazarik; Director, GTRI; Tim Lieuwen; Executive VP for Research, Georgia Tech; Ángel Cabrera; President, Georgia Tech
- Affiliations: Georgia Institute of Technology
- Revenue: US$964 million (FY25)
- Employees: More than 3,000 (July 2025)
- Website: www.gtri.gatech.edu

The Georgia Tech Research Institute (GTRI) is the nonprofit applied research arm of the Georgia Institute of Technology in Atlanta, Georgia, United States. GTRI employs around 3,000 people, and was involved in nearly $1 billion in research in fiscal year 2025 for clients in industry and government.

Initially known as the Engineering Experiment Station, (EES) the organization was proposed in 1929 by W. Harry Vaughan as an analog to the agricultural experiment stations; the Georgia General Assembly passed a law that year creating the organization on paper but did not allocate funds to start it. To boost the state's struggling economy in the midst of the Great Depression, funds were found, and the station was finally established with US$5,000 (equivalent to $100,000 in 2025) in April 1934.

GTRI's research spans a variety of disciplines, including national defense, homeland security, public health, education, mobile and wireless technologies, and economic development. Major customers for GTRI research include United States Department of Defense agencies, the state of Georgia, non-defense federal agencies, and private industry. Overall, contracts and grants from Department of Defense agencies account for approximately 84% of GTRI's total research funding. Since it was established, GTRI has expanded its engineering focus to include science, economics, policy, and other areas that leverage GTRI's partnership with Georgia Tech. GTRI researchers are named on 76 active patents and 43 pending patents.

== History ==
=== Establishment ===
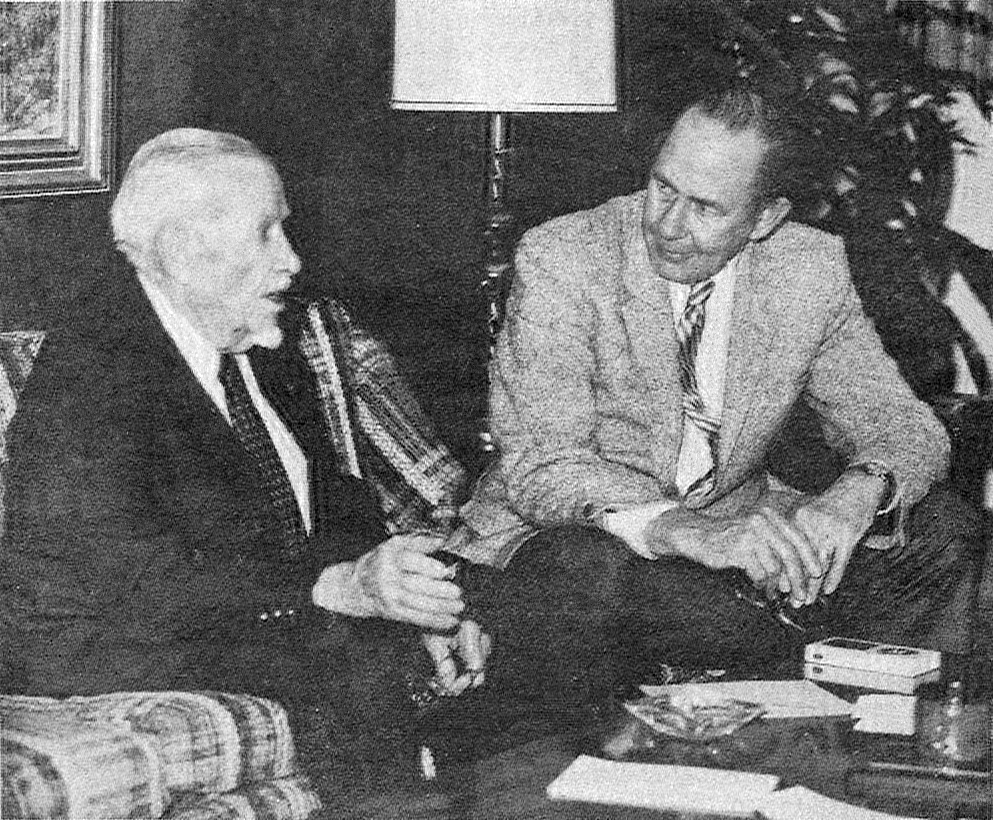
First GTRI director, W. Harry Vaughan (left), visiting GTRI Director Don Grace in 1984.

After being founded in 1885, Georgia Tech grew from a trade school into a university over several decades. However, there was little state initiative to see the school expand significantly until 1919. That year, in a move similar to the Hatch Act of 1887's establishment of agricultural experiment stations, the federal debate over whether to create engineering experiment stations similarly spurred the Georgia General Assembly to pass an act titled "Establishing State Engineering Experiment Station at the Georgia School of Technology." This station was established with the goal of the "encouragement of industries and commerce" within the state. The federal effort ultimately failed and the state did not finance the organization.

In 1929, some Georgia Tech faculty members belonging to Sigma Xi started a Research Club at Tech that met once a month. One of the monthly subjects, proposed by W. Harry Vaughan, was a collection of issues related to Georgia Tech, such as library development, and the development of a state engineering station. This group investigated the forty existing engineering experiment stations at universities around the country, and a report was compiled by Harold Bunger, Montgomery Knight, and Vaughan in December 1929. Their report noted that several similar organizations had been opened across the country at other engineering schools and were successful in local economic development.

In 1933, S. V. Sanford, president of the University of Georgia, proposed that a "technical research activity" be established at Georgia Tech in order to boost the state's struggling economy in the midst of the Great Depression. The Georgia Board of Regents provided the new Engineering Experiment Station with $5,000 (equivalent to $100,000 in 2025), and Georgia Tech provided infrastructure and personnel. The station started operation in April 1934.

=== Early years ===
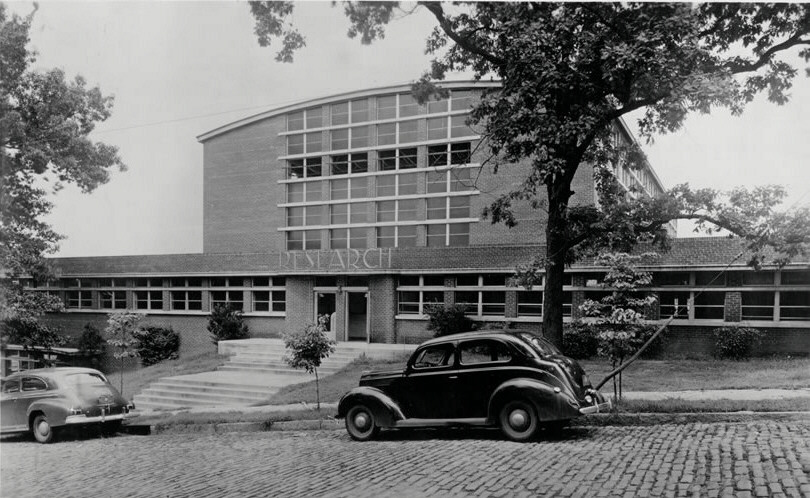
The Thomas Hinman Research Building, built in 1939 and expanded in the 1950s.

Vaughan was selected as the Engineering Experiment Station's acting director in April 1934 and hired 13 part-time faculty and a few graduate assistants. The station's initial areas of focus were textiles, ceramics, and helicopter engineering. The early work of the station was conducted in the basement of the Old Shop Building next to Tech Tower, and Vaughan's office was in the Aeronautical Engineering Building. The station's name was technically the State Engineering Experiment Station, but it was generally referred to as the Engineering Experiment Station (EES) or simply "the research station".

By 1938, the Engineering Experiment Station was producing useful technology, and the station needed a method to conduct contract work outside the state budget. Consequently, the Industrial Development Council (IDC) was formed. The IDC was created as a non-profit contract organization for the EES, which allowed the EES to receive federal contracts while still retaining its relationship with Georgia Tech and the State of Georgia. It was created by the Chancellor of the University System and the president of Georgia Power Company, and the Engineering Experiment Station's director was a member of the council. The IDC later became the Georgia Tech Research Corporation, which currently serves as the sole contract organization for all Georgia Tech faculty and departments. In addition, the contract organization manages the intellectual property that results from research.

Examples of projects undertaken under Vaughan's directorship include Montgomery Knight's helicopter research, the Georgia Economic Survey, $6,000 (equivalent to $110,000 in 2025) in aeronautical research for the Guggenheim Foundation, and textile research that created cotton roving and spinning processes that were three to five times faster than contemporary practices. Vaughan was instrumental in securing a permanent building for the station, initially known as the Research Building; several years later it was expanded and named the Thomas Hinman Research Building, after Atlanta dentist and university donor Thomas Hinman. After Vaughan left for the Tennessee Valley Authority in 1940, Harold Bunger (head of the Chemistry Department) took over as acting director. However, Bunger died not long thereafter in August 1941. Bunger's successor was Gerald Rosselot, who had been appointed assistant director by Georgia Tech's president in 1940.

=== World War II ===
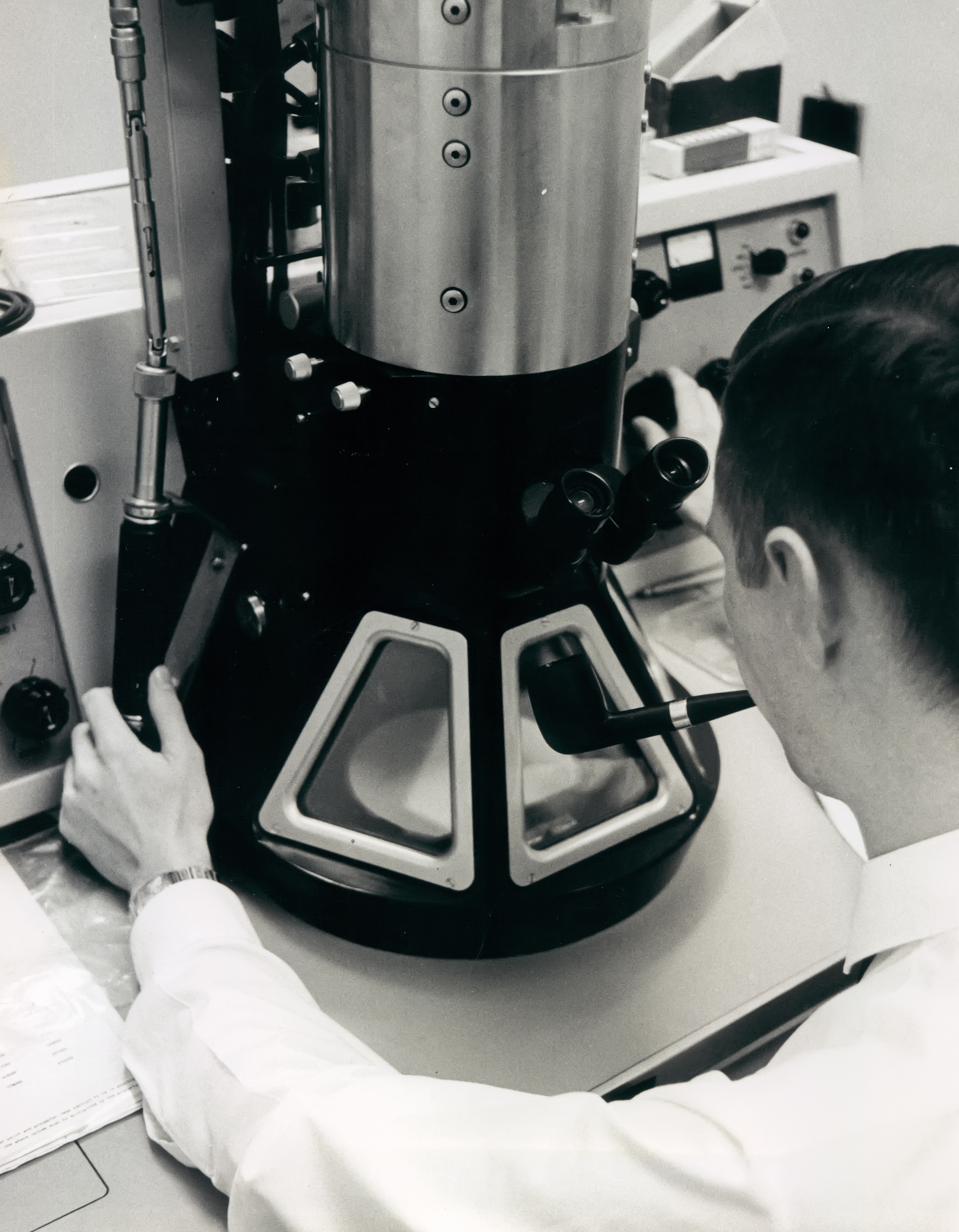
EES Researcher Jim Hubbard with the EM200 electron microscope

The number and value of contracts coming to the station significantly increased during World War II; the 1943–1944 budget was the first in which industry and government contracts exceeded the station's other income, most notably, its state appropriation. Director Vaughan had initially prepared the faculty for fewer incoming contracts as the Georgia General Assembly had cut the station's appropriation by 40%, but increased support from industry and government eventually compensated for lower state funding. World War II is credited with GTRI's entry into electronics, especially telecommunications and electronic warfare; the electronics and communications work that Director Rosselot attracted is still a mainstay of GTRI research. Two of the larger projects were a study on the propagation of electromagnetic waves, and United States Navy–sponsored radar research.

At the end of World War II, Georgia Tech had about $240,000 (equivalent to $3,400,000 in 2025) annually in sponsored research. Important investments during Rosselot's administration at the Engineering Experiment Station included the purchase of an electron microscope in 1946 for $13,000 (equivalent to $200,000 in 2025), the first such instrument in the Southeastern United States and one of few in the United States at the time. The Research Building was expanded, and a $300,000 (equivalent to $3,400,000 in 2025) Westinghouse A-C network calculator was given to Georgia Tech by Georgia Power in 1947.

Rosselot's administration included the 1946 establishment of the Industrial Development Council, renamed to the Georgia Tech Research Institute in 1948 and its present name, the Georgia Tech Research Corporation, in 1984. The Georgia Board of Regents had ruled that all money received in a year had to be spent that year, which was problematic because most government contracts the EES had received spanned multiple years. Georgia Tech president Blake Van Leer and vice president Cherry Emerson solution was to create the Industrial Development Council, a non-profit corporation that would manage contracts for research services and subsequently hire the Engineering Experiment Station to perform the research. It would handle patents garnered through research, and distribute funds garnered from contracts and patents as needed. The new organization was almost immediately used to weather a severe drop in state support (from $89,000 to $3,000) during the recession of 1949.

=== Scientific Atlanta ===
Glen P. Robinson and six other Georgia Tech researchers (including Robinson's former professor and future EES director Jim Boyd and EES director Gerald Rosselot) each contributed $100 (equivalent to $1,000 in 2025) and founded Scientific Associates (later known as Scientific Atlanta) on October 31, 1951, with the initial goal of marketing antenna structures being developed by the radar branch of the EES. Robinson worked as the general manager without pay for the first year; after the fledgling company's first contract resulted in a $4,000 loss, Robinson (upon request) refunded five of the six other initial investors.

From 1950 to 1952, there were a series of disputes between EES director Rosselot and Georgia Tech vice president Cherry Emerson over the station's finances and Rosselot's hand in founding Scientific Associates. When it was founded in October 1951, Rosselot was president and CEO of Scientific Associates; at issue was the potential conflict of interest with his role at Georgia Tech, and what, if any, role Georgia Tech should have in technology transfer to the marketplace. Emerson later instituted a policy requiring EES employees wishing to work with Scientific Associates to make a written request to the president of Georgia Tech. However, Rosselot's participation in Scientific Associates' founding and early operations ensured the eventual success of Scientific Atlanta and facilitated subsequent technology transfer by Georgia Tech's VentureLab and the Advanced Technology Development Center.

In September 1952, the Board of Regents requested an audit of EES's financial operation. Of primary concern was the reporting of overhead income, which the Board suspected was inadequate. The audit found discrepancies in the accounts receivable that were attributed to EES's practice of delaying reporting information on receivables by a month, a tactic that had become common to ensure working capital due to the regents' failure to adequately fund the station. Though Rosselot denied malfeasance, the practice nonetheless did not conform to the University System of Georgia's established procedures for budget reporting. As a result, Rosselot went on leave from his post at Georgia Tech in November 1952, pending the acceptance of his resignation by the chancellor, which became effective March 1, 1953. Following his resignation, Rosselot soon accepted a position with the Bendix Corporation's aviation division.

=== Cold War era ===
Comparison of ranks at Georgia Tech
Academic	Research (non-tenure)
Professor	Senior research scientist or engineer
Associate professor	Research scientist or engineer
Assistant professor	Junior research scientist or engineer
Instructor	Research assistant

In March 1950, Herschel H. Cudd was appointed head of EES's Chemical Sciences division. After Gerald Rosselot went on leave pending his resignation, Cudd was named acting director of EES in November 1952, then named director in July 1953, and resigned in November 1953 to accept a much higher-paying position at the American Viscoe Corporation. Although he was in the post for only a year, Cudd made far-reaching changes to the station. Under Rosselot, research had been increasingly concentrated on a few researchers; Cudd reversed this trend to the extent that EES's 1952–53 Annual Report stated that 66 faculty in 15 schools performed research at the station that year. Cudd created a new promotion system for researchers that is still in use to this day. Many EES researchers held the rank of professor despite lacking a doctorate (or a comparable qualification for promotion as determined by the Georgia Board of Regents), something that irritated members of the teaching faculty. The new system, approved in the spring of 1953, used the Board of Regents' qualifications for promotion and mirrored the academic tenure track.

Cudd spent a significant amount of the EES operating budget on improving laboratory facilities. Cudd's successor Paul K. Calaway, previously director of the School of Chemistry, made a last-minute request to the contract organization in May 1954 to cover the resulting $20,000 (equivalent to $190,000 in 2025) deficit. In 1954, a faculty committee appointed to do a comprehensive study of Georgia Tech, "The Aims and Objectives of the Georgia Institute of Technology", noted that of EES's budget of $2 million for 1953–1954 (equivalent to $19 million in 2025), about 83% was sponsored by governmental agencies, and about two thirds of that was classified. In 1955, the Rich Electronic Computer Center, a new wing on the Hinman Research Building, was dedicated; the project was paid for by $85,000 (equivalent to $800,000 in 2025) from the Rich Foundation and a matching grant from the EES's contract organization.

This period saw a significant expansion in Georgia Tech's postgraduate education programs, which received substantial support from the EES. Despite its slow start, with the first Master of Science programs in the 1920s and the first doctorate in 1946, the program became firmly established. In 1952 alone, around 80 students earned graduate degrees while working at EES.

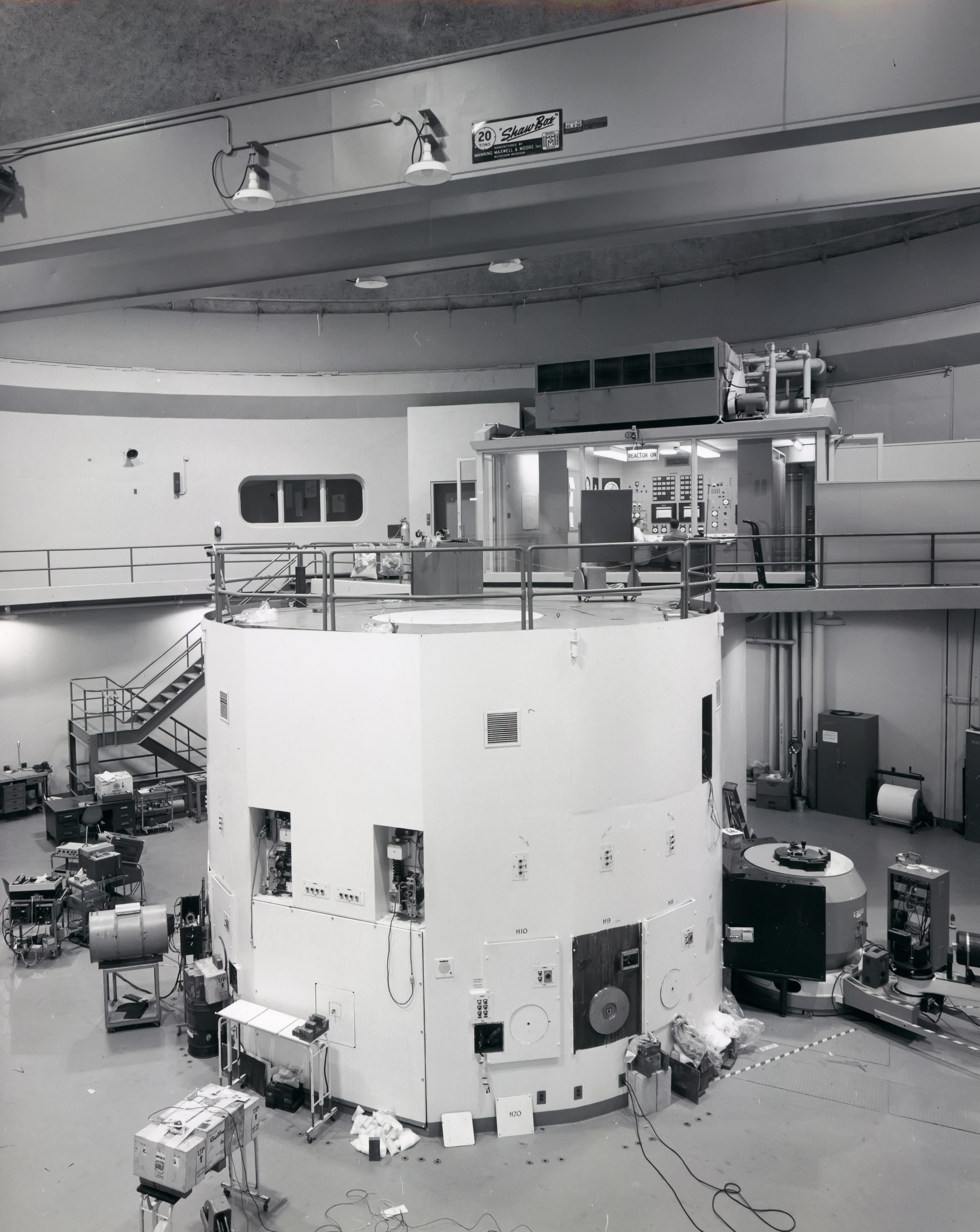
The Neely Research Reactor, which was built in part due to James E. Boyd's influence.

James E. Boyd was promoted to Assistant Director of Research at the station in 1954, and succeeded Calaway as the director on July 1, 1957. While at Georgia Tech, Boyd wrote an influential article about the role of research centers at institutes of technology, which argued that research should be integrated with education, and Boyd correspondingly involved undergraduates in his research. Boyd was known for recruiting faculty capable of both teaching and performing notable research; one such example is his recruitment of noted physicist and nuclear scientist Earl W. McDaniel.

Under Boyd's purview, the Engineering Experiment Station gained many electronics-related contracts, to the extent that an Electronics Division was created in 1959; it would focus on radar and communications. Boyd championed the establishment of research facilities. In 1955, Georgia Tech president Blake Van Leer appointed Boyd to Georgia Tech's Nuclear Science Committee. The committee recommended the creation of a Radioisotopes Laboratory Facility and a large research reactor on campus. The former was built and dedicated on January 7, 1959, and could receive, store, and process radioactive materials. The Frank H. Neely Research Reactor was completed in 1963 and was operational until 1996, when it was defueled due to safety concerns related to the nearby 1996 Summer Olympics events. The reactor was permanently decommissioned in 1999.

Throughout the Cold War era, radar and antenna related applications remained a prominent research activity in EES' contracts with the Defense Department. Millimeter wave radar research, in particular, was prominent in EES' defense activities from the late 1950s, when the first military-designation millimeter-wave radar was built at Georgia Tech, to the 1980s, when GTRI developed what was then the world's highest frequency microwave radar. EES' high-frequency radar research found applications in radio astronomy, meteorology and climate studies, which improved weather forecasting and climate models and assisted in NASA's planning of the Cassini and Galileo missions. Expansion of EES' antenna research in the 1970s, in particular, the development of an air defense antenna for the U.S. Army Missile Command, resulted in the establishment of the Huntsville Research Laboratory, GTRI's oldest off-campus research center.

In 1980, EES developed a TEMPEST-approved version of the Apple II Plus for U.S. Army FORSCOM, and used it as a component in the earliest versions of the Microfix system. Fielded in 1982, the Microfix system was the first tactical system using video disk (LaserDisc) map technology providing zoom and scroll over map imagery coupled with a point database of intelligence data such as order of battle, airfields, roadways, and bridges. President Ronald Reagan's Strategic Defense Initiative resulted in the largest research contract in Georgia Tech's history in 1985. The $21.3 million contract (equivalent to $63.8 million in 2025) was divided between GTRI and the School of Electrical Engineering. GTRI landed its own largest-ever contract in 1986—$14.7 million (equivalent to $43.2 million in 2025) to create a Soviet surface-to-air missile system simulator. In 1989, as part of a project with the U.S. Army, and using technology it had been developing since the late 1960s, GTRI completed the largest outdoor compact antenna range at Fort Huachuca, Arizona.

On April 10, 1989, GTRI announced that one of its research groups, led by James Mahaffey, had duplicated the results of a controversial University of Utah experiment that had allegedly achieved cold fusion in a jar of water. Four days following the announcement, the researchers discovered that the instrument used to measure neutrons was damaged by the heat of the liquid and gave false, elevated readings. GTRI immediately retracted its support of the Utah researchers' findings, citing the flawed measurement. Director Donald J. Grace referred to the mistake as "embarrassing", recalling that he and Mahaffey "blushed the whole time".

=== Expansion and reorganization ===
The Georgia General Assembly amended EES' charter in the early 1960s, authorizing an "industrial extension service to meet the technical, informational and other needs of industry and local development groups". This led to an expansion of some of EES' activities that it had been involved in since the 1940s. In particular, EES began providing additional services as a technological incubator during this time frame, and began an international development initiative that improved infrastructure and facilitated technology transfer in over 40 developing nations. The station's expanded mission bolstered its traditional research strengths, resulting in work on projects that improved radar operation on the Saturn rocket and in the invention of the compact antenna range by Richard C. Johnson. Throughout the 1960s, these changes brought about an increased focus on research that sought to solve societal problems rather than research for the sake of pure scientific knowledge. This came at a time when director Maurice W. Long began placing an emphasis on graduate education and multidisciplinary research.

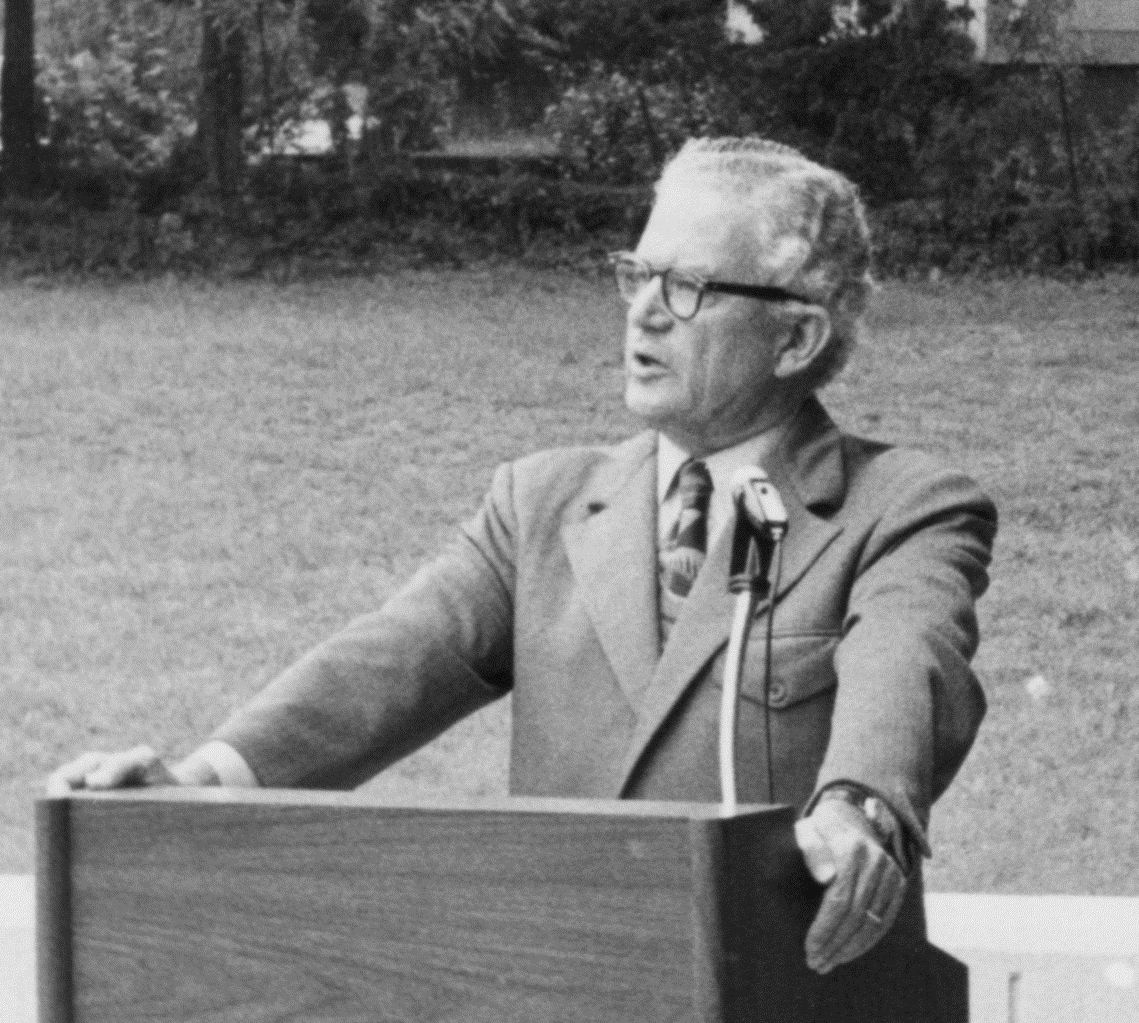
James E. Boyd speaking at Georgia Tech.

The late 1960s saw a period of student unrest, and university research centers that worked on contracts for the Department of Defense were often the site of student protests. Neither Georgia Tech nor EES became the focus of protests, and Long attributed this to the school's "conservative student body". For other reasons, however, EES became embattled financially and politically as a result of cuts in federal and state spending as well as cuts to the space program. Georgia Tech's academic units were similarly affected by these cuts, which helped rekindle the debate over EES' relationship with the school.

Georgia Tech president Arthur G. Hansen's "bold and controversial" solution to both entities' problems was to completely absorb the station into Georgia Tech's academic units. On paper, this would dramatically increase Georgia Tech's stated research funding (as all of it would be performed through the academic units), and it would increase options and financial aid for graduate students. Another, less publicized, reason was that Georgia Tech would gain access to the contract organization's reserve fund, which was said to be over $1 million (equivalent to $8.3 million in 2025). Thomas E. Stelson, Dean of the College of Engineering at Georgia Tech, was named to "reorganize" the station. Publicly, Stelson's task was simply to recommend a plan for reorganization, but the administration clearly intended for Georgia Tech and the Engineering Experiment Station to be closely integrated. Maurice W. Long, who was director of the station at the time, viewed the move as a violation of the EES's charter as legislatively established by the Georgia General Assembly in 1919, and asserted that Georgia Tech did not have the authority to merge the two institutions. EES employees and business executives involved with the station appealed to the Georgia Board of Regents and to Governor of Georgia (and future United States president) Jimmy Carter (himself a Georgia Tech alumnus); the controversy received coverage in both The Technique and the Atlanta Constitution.

When former EES director James E. Boyd was appointed as interim president of Georgia Tech following the departure of Hansen, he stopped the plan for complete absorption of the station, but did allow plans for closer control and more aggressive contract solicitation to proceed. Among these measures were increased resource-sharing, including increased sharing of physical assets and research staff. The latter was evidenced by the increase in joint faculty appointments between the EES and Georgia Tech. The move paid off, and the fiscal year 1970–1971 saw EES win new contracts and grants, totaling a record $5.2 million (equivalent to $41.3 million in 2025). Stelson was left in charge of the station's reorganization and was named interim director upon Long's departure in 1975. During his tenure, Stelson reorganized the station into eight semi-autonomous laboratories in order to allow each to develop a specialization and clientele, a model it retains (with slight modifications) to this day.

The Engineering Experiment Station was renamed the Georgia Tech Research Institute in 1984. A separate organization originally called the Industrial Development Council, changed its name to the Georgia Tech Research Institute in February 1946, and finally to the Georgia Tech Research Corporation in 1984. There are legal difficulties when an American university wishes to accept contracts from some entities, especially the federal government, so the second organization is a contracting organization. Most importantly, it allows the university to perform multi-year contracts that are not possible under state law, which requires that money received must be spent in the same fiscal year. The name change coincided with a shift in focus toward obtaining industrial research contracts in addition to its contracts with the federal government. GTRI expanded its footprint in the mid to late 1980s: the Centennial Research Building opened on the north end of the Georgia Tech campus in 1985, providing expanded lab and office space, and the electromagnetic radiation measurement range was established at GTRI's Cobb County research facility.

Names of GTRI-related organizations since 1934
1930s						1940s										1950s										1960s										1970s										1980s										1990s										2000s										2010s			
4	5	6	7	8	9	0	1	2	3	4	5	6	7	8	9	0	1	2	3	4	5	6	7	8	9	0	1	2	3	4	5	6	7	8	9	0	1	2	3	4	5	6	7	8	9	0	1	2	3	4	5	6	7	8	9	0	1	2	3	4	5	6	7	8	9	0	1	2	3	4	5	6	7	8	9	0	1	2	3
Engineering Experiment Station																																																		Georgia Tech Research Institute																													
				Industrial Development Council										Georgia Tech Research Institute																																				Georgia Tech Research Corporation																													
				Industrial Development Council										Georgia Tech Research Institute																																																		Georgia Tech Applied Research Corporation															

=== Recent history ===
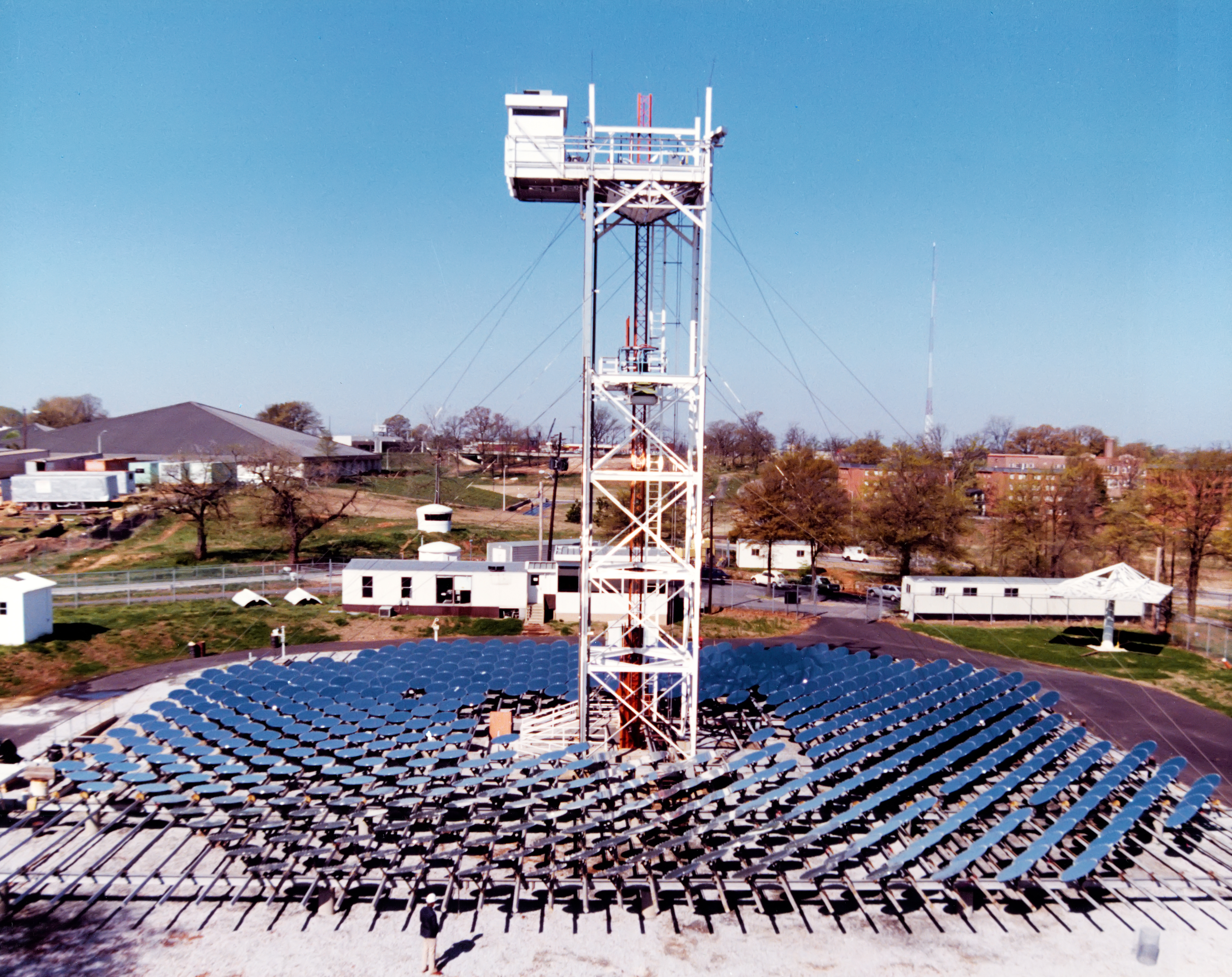
A solar furnace on the Georgia Institute of Technology campus in 1979

From 1992 to 1997, retired Vice Admiral Richard H. Truly was GTRI's director. Truly helped GTRI survive a recession and the end of the Cold War despite its dependence on United States Department of Defense (DOD) contracts. During his tenure the percentage of GTRI's budget from the DOD did experience a small decrease (from 76 percent to 70 percent), but this was balanced by increased research in other fields. In 1997, GTRI passed $100 million in research contracts, with 546 awards for $103,061,780 (equivalent to $191,800,000 in 2025). One of GTRI's more widely used (and ongoing) products, FalconView, was initially developed in the early 1990s; it is a geographic information system that allows pilots to plot flight paths while integrating real-time military intelligence.

Truly was replaced by Edward K. Reedy, who served from 1998 to 2003. Reedy encouraged funding researchers who had ideas that needed support, and introduced a new cost accounting standard for recovering indirect expenditures. Reedy was particularly influential in securing the $7.3 million in funding required to build the Food Processing Technology Building. Under his leadership, GTRI's first endowed chair was established in March 1998 in honor of Glen P. Robinson, the $1.5 million Glen P. Robinson Chair in Electro-Optics. GTRI and Georgia Tech played host to sitting president George W. Bush in March 2002; a mock disaster was staged during the visit, demonstrating new technologies. At the end of Reedy's tenure, GTRI had $115 million in research contracts (equivalent to $192,700,000 in 2025), a new high. Much new funding came as an indirect result of the September 11 attacks and the resulting war on terrorism as the DOD increased related research.

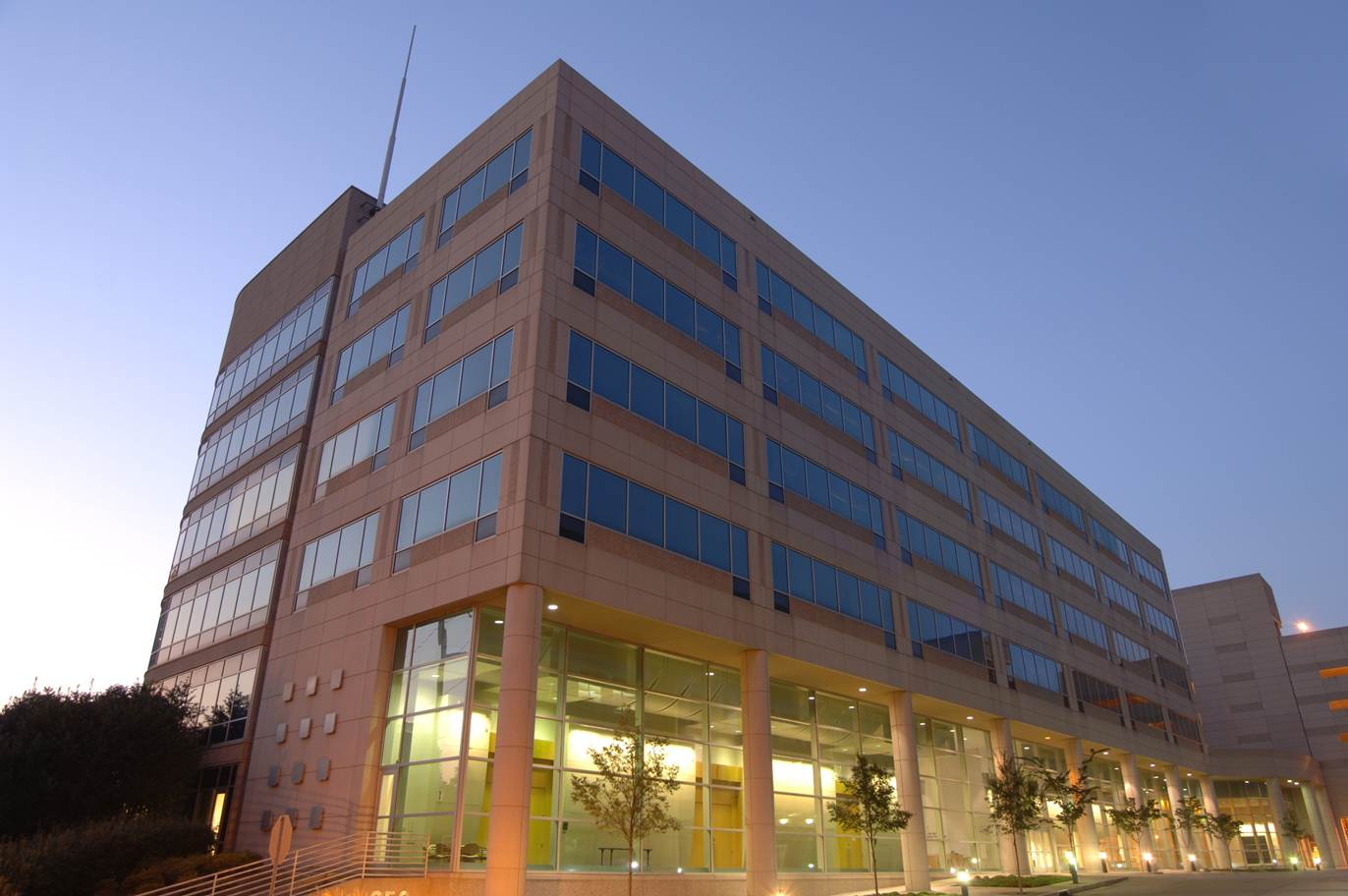
The GTRI headquarters building on 14th Street in Atlanta, Georgia.

Stephen E. Cross was selected as director in late 2003. In March 2010, Cross was named Executive Vice President for Research, a newly created position within Georgia Tech with oversight over all research at the university, including GTRI, the Georgia Tech Research Corporation, the school's interdisciplinary research centers, and the Enterprise Innovation Institute; and will "work closely with" academic researchers. He began his new role on May 1, 2010, and was replaced as director by Robert McGrath.

Some recent notable projects have included the Deployable Joint Command and Control System and ULTRA AP, a concept combat vehicle. In 2010, researchers developed microfabricated planar ion traps using VLSI techniques for use in a trapped ion quantum computer. Also in 2010, researchers developed a method of using GPGPU to crack passwords, coming up with a minimum secure password length of 12 characters. Researchers are investigating the use of radar as a possible concussion detection tool.

GTRI is the primary contractor of the Homeland Open Security Technology program, which aims to promote the creation and use of open security and open-source software in the United States government and military, especially in areas pertaining to computer security. GTRI personnel are involved in DARPA's Anomaly Detection at Multiple Scales project through the Proactive Discovery of Insider Threats Using Graph Analysis and Learning system.

In 2016, former GTRI employees were charged with fraud by misusing PCard that were for official Georgia Tech business purposes, but were used for personal purposes.

In 2018, the U.S. Army renewed a 10-year contract with GTRI worth $2.35 billion for the Department of Defense. In 2019, Georgia Tech won a U.S. Air Force engineering contract worth up to $491 million with the condition of meeting certain criteria after 5 years.

== Description ==
=== Facilities ===
In total, the organization has at least 892,000 square feet (82,900 m^{2}) of laboratory and facility space. GTRI is headquartered on the Georgia Tech campus in Midtown Atlanta, Georgia, where five of its seven research laboratories are located. Some major buildings are the Centennial Research Building, the Baker Building, and the GTRI Headquarters. The GTRI Headquarters contains the GTRI Conference Center, which has 10,000 sq ft (930 m^{2}) of space and hosts over 300 events a year.

Other notable Atlanta buildings include the Food Processing Technology Building and the GTRI Machine Services Building. Two GTRI laboratories operate at an off-campus research facility, the Cobb County Research Facility, approximately fifteen miles north of Atlanta in Cobb County adjacent to the Dobbins Air Reserve Base. Additionally, GTRI operates the Applied Systems Laboratory in Huntsville, Alabama.

GTRI opened an international office in Athlone, Ireland in June 2006. This effort was expanded when Georgia Tech, the National University of Ireland, Galway and the University of Limerick partnered in June 2010 to create a joint translational research institute. GTRI has several field offices that help with nearby on-site research and needs. These are in Dallas, Texas, Dayton, Ohio, Shalimar, Florida (near Eglin Air Force Base), Huntsville, Alabama, Jacksonville, Florida, Orlando, Florida, Panama City, Florida, Quantico, Virginia, San Diego, California, Tucson, Arizona, Warner Robins, Georgia (near Robins Air Force Base), and Arlington, Virginia/Washington, DC.

== Organization ==
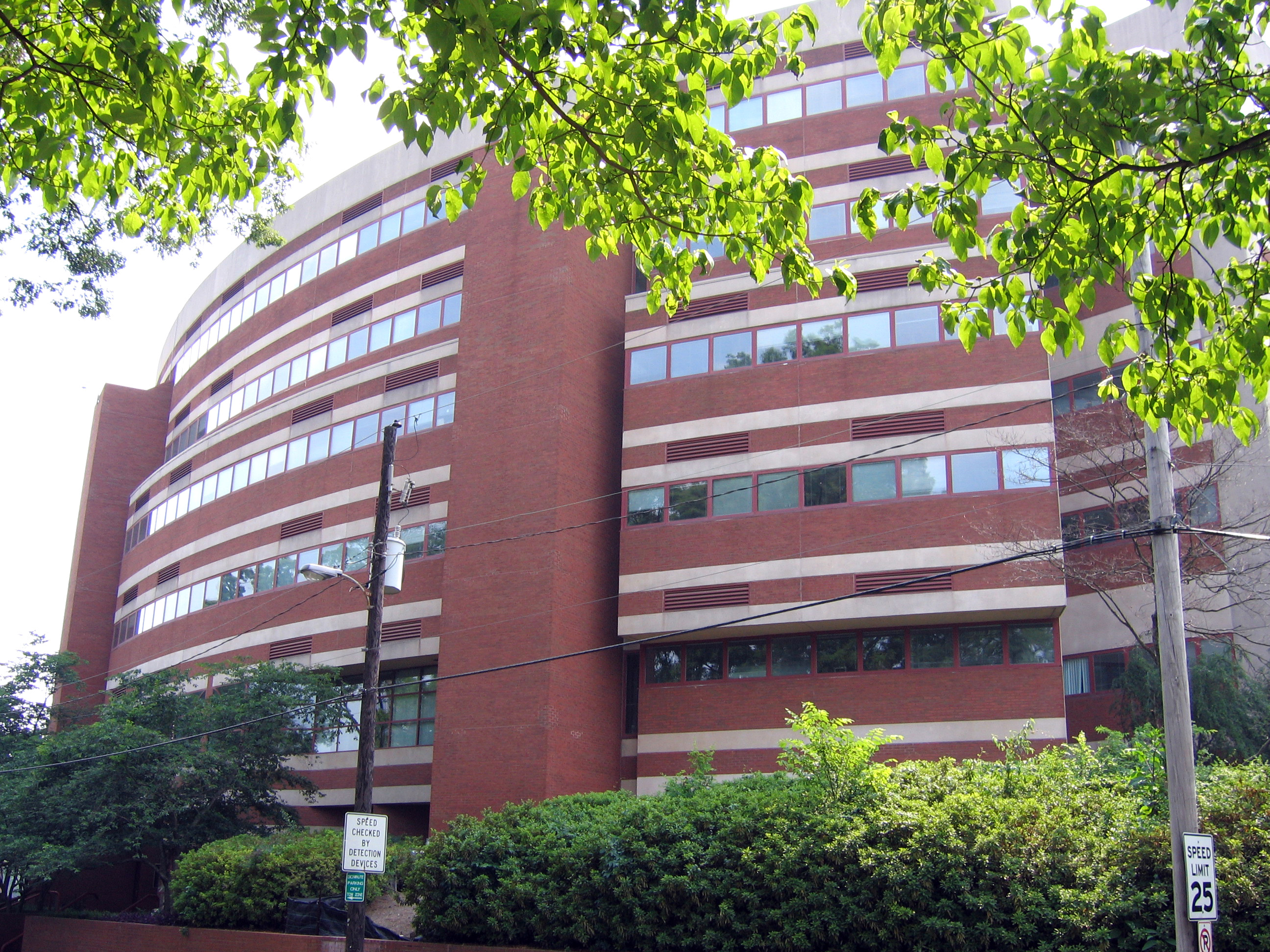
The Centennial Research Building, home to the Electronic Systems and Advanced Concepts Laboratories

=== Structure ===
GTRI is composed of eight laboratories organized by technical focus into three research and development directorates. Each lab is further subdivided into divisions. Labs frequently collaborate with one another and outside groups (both academic units and external companies) based on the requirements of each project. GTRI performs research for clients at the local, regional, national, and international level, and employees are encouraged to publish their work and present it at conferences and consortia.

GTRI is an operating unit of Georgia Tech although it performs research under commercial cost principles for non-profit organizations. For that reason, it uses a separate contracting entity, the Georgia Tech Applied Research Corporation (GTARC). Although GTARC is the contracting entity, the Georgia Tech Research Corporation (GTRC) owns the intellectual property created by all Georgia Tech researchers and manages technology protection and licensing. GTRI reports to the Georgia Tech Executive Vice President of Research (as of 2013, Stephen E. Cross) who currently serves as the President of GTARC.

GTRI's project directors are responsible for the direction of all aspects of projects, including marketing, contract development, research, and fulfillment. Most projects are conducted on a cost-reimbursable basis and are negotiated by Georgia Tech's Office of Sponsored Programs with terms and conditions appropriate for contracts specific to the operation of a university research organization.

The organization is led by the Director, who is also considered a vice president of Georgia Tech. Five people report to the director: the Deputy Director and Associate Vice Provost for Research; the Deputy Director for Support Operations; and the three deputy directors in charge of each research and development directorate. The eight lab directors report to their respective deputy director of research and development.

GTRI, like many traditional boards of directors, has an External Advisory Council, which consists of individuals who are notable in related fields of industry, government or academia and who provide advice about research direction, strategy, and markets, although they do not govern the organization. Members of the Board of Trustees of the contracting agency, GTARC, are not necessarily members of the External Advisory Council, although there is sometimes overlap between them.

=== University affiliation ===
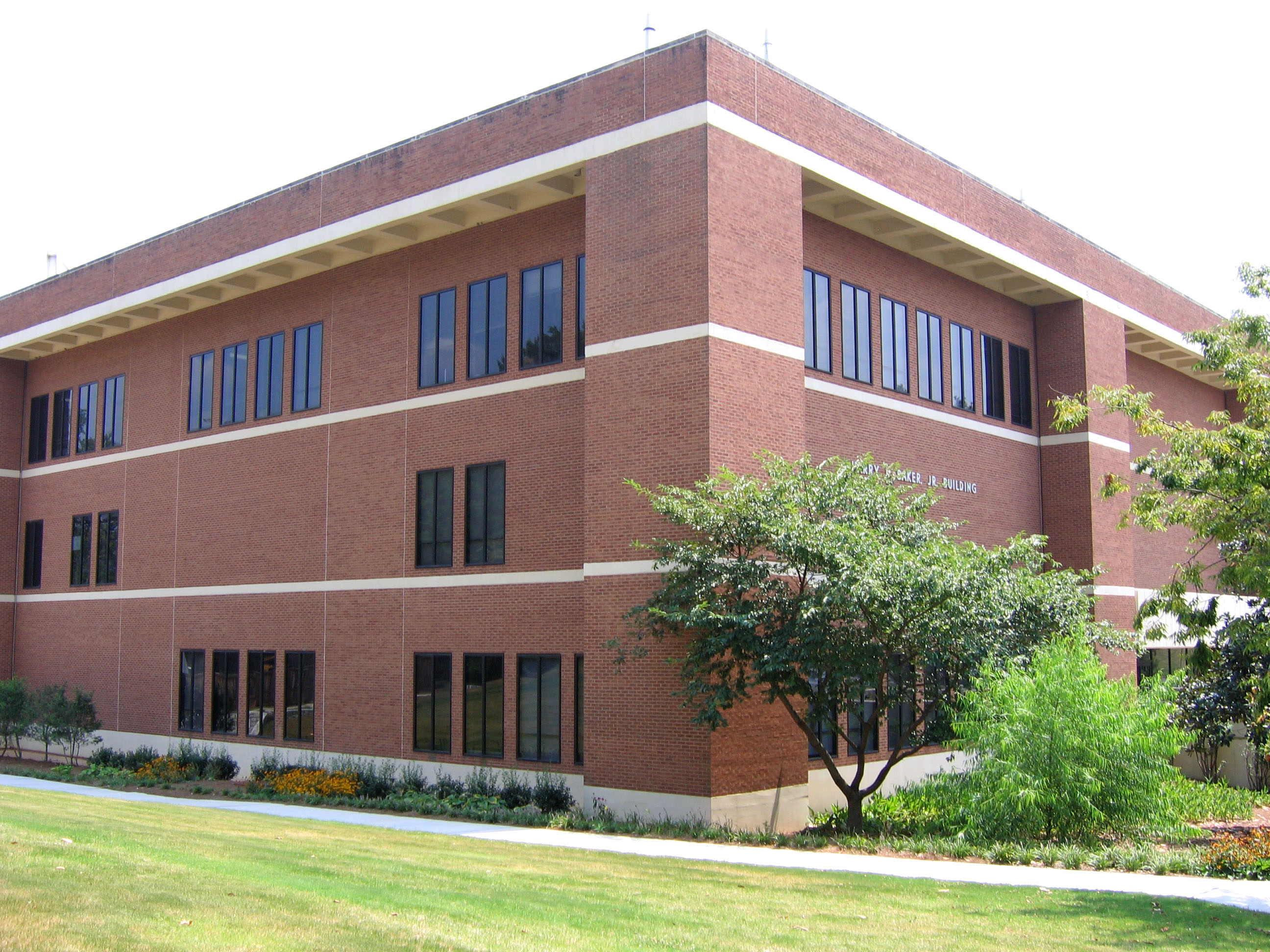
The Baker Building, named for Harry L. Baker Jr., is home to the Electro-Optical Systems Laboratory.

In 1995, GTRI was designated a University Affiliated Research Center by the United States Department of Defense. They are the largest single employer of Georgia Tech graduate and undergraduate students; as of 2013, GTRI employed 186 graduate co-ops and research assistants and 128 undergraduate co-ops.

=== Laboratories ===
GTRI conducts its research programs through eight laboratories organized into three research and development directorates that focus on specific subjects:

Name	Research area	Reference
Electronics, Optics & Systems
Applied Systems Laboratory (ASL)	This laboratory, in Huntsville, Alabama, primarily supports the United States Army Aviation and Missile Research, Development, and Engineering Center (USA AMRDEC) in its aviation and missile R&D efforts.	
Electronic Systems Laboratory (ELSYS)	ELSYS focuses on systems engineering solutions in electronic defense; modeling, simulation and analysis; countermeasures technique development; sensors performance analysis; electronic warfare systems integration; standardized test procedures; flight test support; laboratory support stations and test systems; missile warning system improvements; technology insertion and human factors.	
Electro-Optical Systems Laboratory (EOSL)	EOSL has technology thrusts in the areas of electro-optical modeling and analysis, microelectronic and nanotechnology development, remote sensing, acoustics, and mechanical systems.	
Information & Cyber Sciences
Cybersecurity, Information Protection and Hardware Evaluation Research Laboratory (CIPHER)	CIPHER is the newest lab, founded on October 1, 2010. It focuses on cyber security and features existing business areas such as secure information systems and resilient command and control with emerging areas such as cyberwarfare, while collaborating with the Georgia Tech Information Security Center.	
Information and Communications Laboratory (ICL)	ICL conducts a broad range of research in areas of computer science, information technology, communications, networking, and the development of commercial products from university research. Until October 1, 2010, the lab was named the "Information Technology and Telecommunications Laboratory."	
Sensors & Intelligent Systems
Advanced Concepts Laboratory (ACL)	ACL conducts research and development in electromagnetic materials and structures, electromagnetic apertures and scattering, optical and infrared physics and phenomenology, quantum information systems, and secure information systems. They were known as the Signature Technology Laboratory until October 2012.	
Aerospace, Transportation and Advanced Systems Laboratory (ATAS)	ATAS develops advanced systems concepts and performs research related to aerospace systems, power and energy systems, threat systems, intelligent autonomous systems, and systems engineering methodologies. Contains the Agricultural Technology Research Program.	
Sensors and Electromagnetic Applications Laboratory (SEAL)	SEAL researchers investigate radar systems, electromagnetic environmental effects, radar system performance modeling and simulations, and antenna technology.	

=== Interdisciplinary research centers ===
Like many research universities, Georgia Tech has many smaller organizational units dedicated to interdisciplinary research, which combines two or more academic fields into one single discipline. The following centers are based out of the Georgia Tech Research Institute:

Name	Research area	Reference
Accessibility Evaluation Facility (AEF)	AEF has developed techniques for evaluating accessibility and usability, and it works with corporations to create accessibility solutions that conform with disability regulations.	
Center for Consumer Product Research and Testing	The Center for Consumer Product Research and Testing conducts research regarding various consumer needs and experiences with product design and serves as the official product test lab for the Arthritis Foundation and several other arthritis organizations around the world.	
Center for International Development and Cooperation (CIDC)	The CIDC develops low-cost radar and phased array concepts through joint international research activities.	
Center for Optimization of Simulated Multiple Objective Systems (COSMOS)	COSMOS develops tools relating to the simulation of complex systems.	
Commercial Product Realization Office (CPRO)	CPRO provides clients with comprehensive technology selection, product design, prototyping, production preparation, product data documentation, and testing assistance.	
Center for Innovative Fuel Cell and Battery Technologies	This center researches low-temperature fuel cells, solid-oxide fuel cells, hybrid power systems, fuel processing, microscale fuel cells, battery materials, and rapid-charging batteries.	
Electromagnetic Test and Evaluation Facility	The Electromagnetic Test and Evaluation Facility is an antenna testing facility that is capable of performing tests on nearly any type of any antenna for nearly any application.	
Environmental Radiation Center (ERC)	ERC researches the effect of radiation in various environments.	
Environmental Safety and Occupational Health Center (ESOH)	ESOH oversees health and safety compliance programs and conducts research in areas related to sustainability and environmental concerns in the state of Georgia.	
Food Processing Technology Division (FPTD)	The FPTD works with academic and industry partners to develop technological innovations in the fields of food processing and safety, air quality monitoring, and agricultural technology.	
Foundations for the Future (F3)	F3 provides vendor-neutral technology advising and customized professional development experiences for educators.	
Georgia Small Business Safety and Health Consultation Program	This program provides free health and safety consultations performed by GTRI scientists and engineers to small business in the state of Georgia.	
Georgia Tech Quantum Institute (GTQI)	GTQI focuses on both practical and hard science approaches to the emerging field of quantum information science.	
Historically Black Colleges and Universities Outreach Initiative	This initiative fosters research collaborations between Georgia Tech faculty and faculty at historically black colleges and universities and provides resources for identifying research areas and faculty available for collaboration.	
Interoperability & Integration Innovation Lab (I3L)	I3L provides both physical and virtual collaboration space for health IT researchers and practitioners.	
Landmarc Research Center	Landmarc is a multi-discipline research and development center focused on mobile and wireless solutions.	
Materials Analysis Center (MAC)	The MAC performs materials testing and analysis as well as chemical and materials processing on an "for fee" basis for a variety of academic, industry, and government research purposes.	
Medical Device Test Center	The Medical Device Test Center simulates real-world conditions of exposure to electromagnetic radiation by implanted and external medical devices in order to identify safety and compatibility issues.	
Military Sensing Information Analysis Center (SENSIAC)	This center fosters communications within Military Sensing Technology community; creates standards; and collects, analyzes, synthesizes, maintains, and distributes critical information within the field.	
Modeling & Simulation Research & Education Center	This center develops and supports modeling and simulation programs.	
Office of Policy Analysis and Research (OPAR)	OPAR integrates public policy considerations into GTRI's technical research and facilitates GTRI's input into the science and technology policy debate	
OSHA Training Institute Education Center	The OSHA Training Institute Education Center offers courses and certifications in health and safety, including hazardous materials handling, emergency response, and industrial hygiene.	
Phosphor Technology Center of Excellence (PTCOE)	PTCOE develops phosphor technologies, including improving low-voltage thin-film electroluminescence displays, field emission display films and thin-film cathode ray tube films.	
Severe Storms Research Center (SSRC)	SSRC organizes and coordinates the state's severe weather forecasting, serving as a focal point for severe storm research in Georgia.	
Southeast Center for Young Worker Safety and Health	The Center for Young Worker Safety and Health offers training and educational resources specifically for workers under the age of 25 to promote safety and health in the work environment.	
Test & Evaluation Research and Education Center (TEREC)	TEREC serves as a focal point for solving the problems of the Test and Evaluation Community.	
Unmanned and Autonomous Systems Group	The Unmanned and Autonomous Systems Group performs research ranging from basic and exploratory to prototype development of unmanned systems for a variety of applications, including military, agriculture, industrial, and social.	

== Works cited ==
- McMath, Robert C.; Ronald H. Bayor; James E. Brittain; Lawrence Foster; August W. Giebelhaus; Germaine M. Reed (1985). Engineering the New South: Georgia Tech 1885–1985. Athens, GA: University of Georgia Press. ISBN 978-0-8203-0784-8.
- Wallace, Robert (1969). Dress Her in WHITE and GOLD: A biography of Georgia Tech. Atlanta, Georgia: Georgia Tech Foundation.
