= Rickey B. Cotton =

- Born: July 1, 1957; Munford, Alabama
- Died: November 29, 2007 (aged 50)
- Education: Georgia Institute of Technology
- Scientific career
- Fields: Radar, Electromagnetism
- Workplaces: Georgia Tech Research Institute

Rickey Bryan Cotton (July 1, 1957 - November 29, 2007) was a researcher in electromagnetism and radar-related fields at the Georgia Tech Research Institute's Sensors and Electromagnetic Applications Laboratory from 1980 until 2007.

== Education ==
Cotton received a bachelor's degree in electrical engineering at Auburn University in 1980 and also received a Master of Science in electrical engineering from the Georgia Institute of Technology in 1983.

== Career ==
Cotton joined the Georgia Tech Research Institute (GTRI) as a research engineer in 1980 and quickly became instrumental in the expansion of the Sensors and Electromagnetic Applications Laboratory (SEAL) by forging a strong relationship with the Office of Naval Intelligence. A protégé of Richard C. Johnson, Cotton helped oversee GTRI's installation of the compact radar range at Fort Huachuca in 1989. He was named a division chief at SEAL in 2000.

== Legacy ==
GTRI named the Rickey B. Cotton Electromagnetic Phenomenology Laboratory at the Cobb County Research Facility in his honor in 2011.
