= William L. Melvin =

American engineer

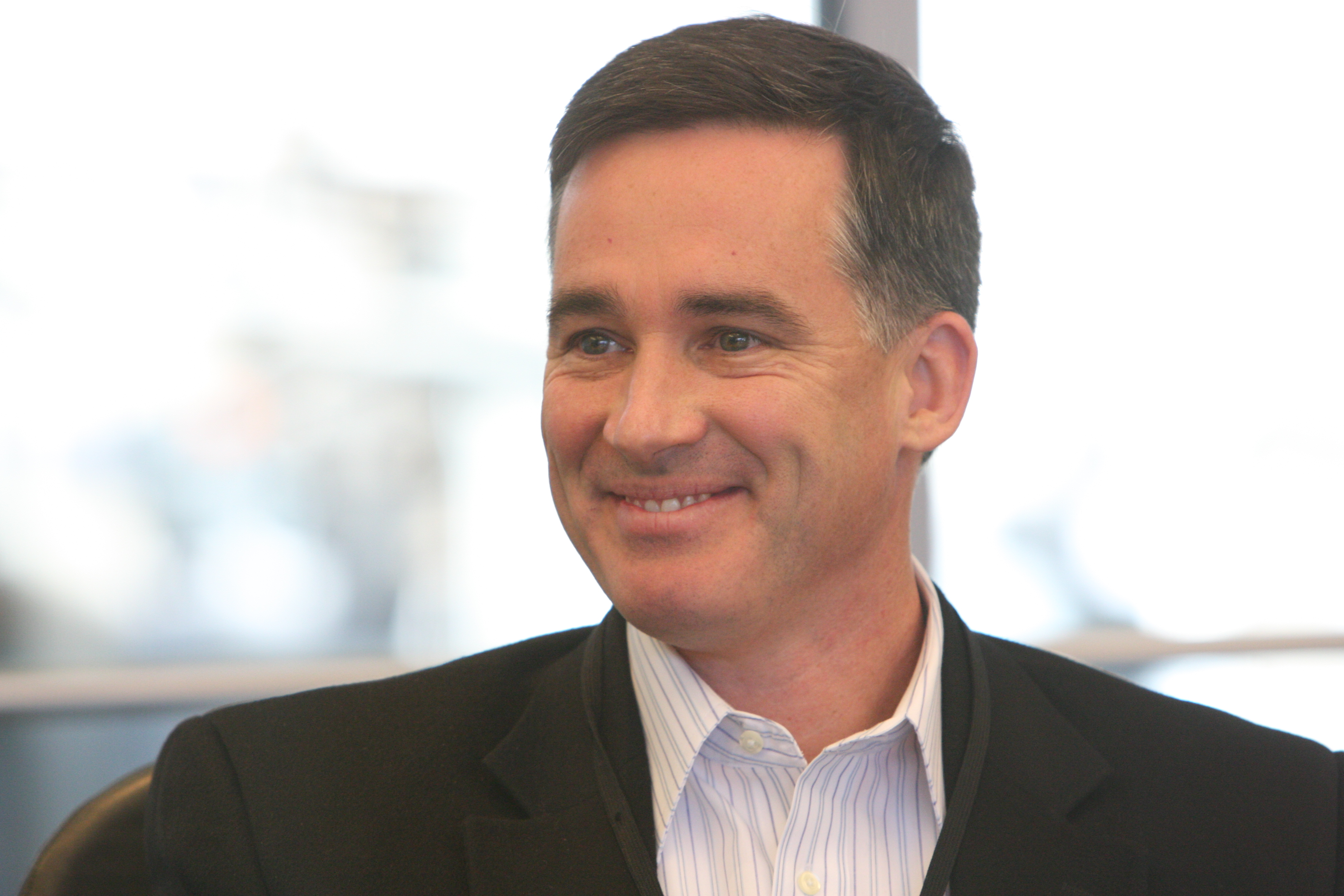
- Citizenship: American
- Education: Lehigh University
- Awards: 2006 Young Radar Engineer of the Year; IEEE Fellow
- Scientific career
- Fields: Radar; Signal processing
- Workplaces: Georgia Tech Research Institute; Rome Laboratory

William L. "Bill" Melvin is currently the Chief Scientist and Technical Fellow in the Sensors Division at Systems and Technology Research (STR) in Woburn, MA. He was formerly the deputy director of Sensors and Intelligent Systems at the Georgia Tech Research Institute. He is a former director of the GTRI Sensors and Electromagnetic Applications Laboratory (SEAL).

== Early life and education ==
Melvin earned a BS, an MS, and a Ph.D. in electrical engineering, all from Lehigh University.

== Career ==
Melvin served in the United States Air Force at the Rome Laboratory (currently known as the Air Force Research Laboratory), where he worked on airborne surveillance radar.

He joined the Georgia Tech Research Institute in 1998, where his research resulted in three patents on adaptive radar. He also took an adjunct faculty position in Georgia Tech's School of Electrical and Computer Engineering. In 2006, he became the director of the Sensors and Electromagnetic Applications Laboratory (SEAL), replacing Robert N. Trebits. He remained director of the lab until 2014, when he was named deputy director of the Sensors and Intelligent Systems Directorate, which oversees SEAL as well as the Aerospace, Transportation and Advanced Systems Laboratory and the Applied Concepts Laboratory.

== Memberships and awards ==
Melvin is an active IEEE member, and is an IEEE Fellow. Melvin received a "Best Paper" award at the 1997 IEEE Radar Conference. In spring 2006, Melvin was named "Young Radar Engineer of the Year" by the IEEE Radar Systems Panel of the IEEE Aerospace and Electronic Systems Society.
