= Reflector (antenna) =

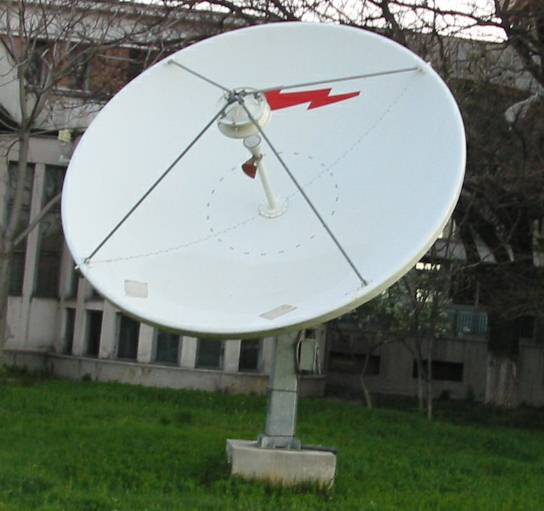
Parabolic reflector as part of a Satellite dish

An antenna reflector is a device that reflects electromagnetic waves. Antenna reflectors can exist as a standalone device for redirecting radio frequency (RF) energy, or can be integrated as part of an antenna assembly.

== Standalone reflectors ==
Types of parabolic antennas

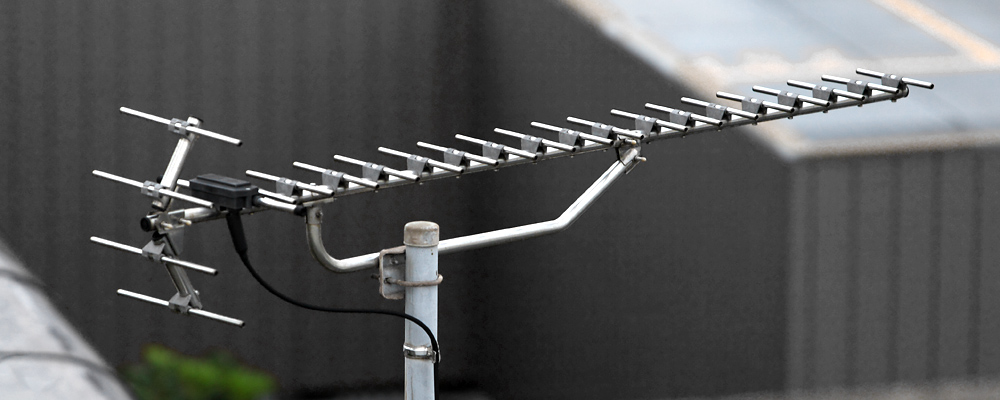
Corner reflector part of a UHF television antenna

The function of a standalone reflector is to redirect electromagnetic (EM) energy, generally in the radio wavelength range of the electromagnetic spectrum.

Common standalone reflector types are

- corner reflector, which reflects the incoming signal back to the direction from which it came, commonly used in radar.
- flat reflector, which reflects the signal such as a mirror and is often used as a passive repeater.

== Integrated reflectors ==
When integrated into an antenna assembly, the reflector serves to modify the radiation pattern of the antenna, increasing gain in a given direction.

Common integrated reflector types are

- parabolic reflector, which focuses a beam signal into one point or directs a radiating signal into a beam.
- a passive element slightly longer than and located behind a radiating dipole element that absorbs and re-radiates the signal in a directional way as in a Yagi antenna array.
- a flat reflector such as used in a Short backfire antenna or Sector antenna.
- a corner reflector used in UHF television antennas.
- a cylindrical reflector as used in Cantenna.

== Design criteria ==
Parameters that can directly influence the performance of an antenna with integrated reflector:

- Dimensions of the reflector (Big ugly dish versus small dish)
- Spillover (part of the feed antenna radiation misses the reflector)
- Aperture blockage (also known as feed blockage: part of the feed energy is reflected back into the feed antenna and does not contribute to the main beam)
- Illumination taper (feed illumination reduced at the edges of the reflector)
- Reflector surface deviation
- Defocusing
- Cross polarization
- Feed losses
- Antenna feed mismatch
- Non-uniform amplitude/phase distributions

The antenna efficiency is measured in terms of its effectiveness ratio.

Any gain-degrading factors which raise side lobes have a two-fold effect, in that they contribute to system noise temperature in addition to reducing gain. Aperture blockage and deviation of reflector surface (from the designed "ideal") are two important cases. Aperture blockage is normally due to shadowing by feed, subreflector and/or support members. Deviations in reflector surfaces cause non-uniform aperture distributions, resulting in reduced gains.

The standard symmetrical, parabolic, Cassegrain reflector system is very popular in practice because it allows minimum feeder length to the terminal equipment. The major disadvantage of this configuration is blockage by the hyperbolic sub-reflector and its supporting struts (usually 3–4 are used). The blockage becomes very significant when the size of the parabolic reflector is small compared to the diameter of the sub-reflector. To avoid blockage from the sub-reflector asymmetric designs such as the open Cassegrain can be employed. Note however that the asymmetry can have deleterious effects on some aspects of the antenna's performance - for example, inferior side-lobe levels, beam squint, poor cross-polar response, etc.

To avoid spillover from the effects of over-illumination of the main reflector surface and diffraction, a microwave absorber is sometimes employed. This lossy material helps prevent excessive side-lobe levels radiating from edge effects and over-illumination. Note that in the case of a front-fed Cassegrain the feed horn and feeder (usually waveguide) need to be covered with an edge absorber in addition to the circumference of the main paraboloid.

== Measurements ==
Measurements are made on reflector antennas to establish important performance indicators such as the gain and sidelobe levels. For this purpose the measurements must be made at a distance at which the beam is fully formed. A distance of four Rayleigh distances is commonly adopted as the minimum distance at which measurements can be made, unless specialized techniques are used (see Antenna measurement).

== See also ==
- Lens antenna
- Radio astronomy
