= Rayleigh distance =

Rayleigh distance in optics is the axial distance from a radiating aperture to a point at which the path difference between the axial ray and an edge ray is λ / 4. An approximation of the Rayleigh Distance is $Z = \frac{D^2}{2\lambda}$, in which Z is the Rayleigh distance, D is the aperture of radiation, λ the wavelength. This approximation can be derived as follows. Consider a right angled triangle with sides adjacent $Z$, opposite $\frac{D}{2}$and hypotenuse $Z+\frac{\lambda}{4}$. According to Pythagorean theorem,

$\left(Z+\frac{\lambda}{4}\right)^2 =Z^2 + \left(\frac{D}{2} \right)^2$.

Rearranging, and simplifying

$Z = \frac{D^2}{2\lambda}-\frac{\lambda}{8}$

The constant term$\frac{\lambda}{8}$ can be neglected.

In antenna applications, the Rayleigh distance is often given as four times this value, i.e. $Z = \frac{2D^2}{\lambda}$ which corresponds to the border between the Fresnel and Fraunhofer regions and denotes the distance at which the beam radiated by a reflector antenna is fully formed (although sometimes the Rayleigh distance it is still given as per the optical convention e.g.).

The Rayleigh distance is also the distance beyond which the distribution of the diffracted light energy no longer changes according to the distance Z from the aperture. It is the reduced Fraunhofer diffraction limitation.

Lord Rayleigh's paper on the subject was published in 1891.
