= Fraunhofer distance =

Limit between near field and far field in an antenna

The Fraunhofer distance, named after Joseph von Fraunhofer, is the value of:

$$d = {{2D^2}\over{\lambda}},$$

where D is the largest dimension of the radiator (in the case of a magnetic loop antenna, the diameter) and ${\lambda}$ is the wavelength of the radio wave. This distance provides the limit between the near and far field, allowing for 22.5 degrees of phase deviation over the face of the radiator.

== See also ==
- Fresnel number
- Fresnel diffraction and Fraunhofer diffraction
- Antenna measurement
