= Robert N. Trebits =

American engineer

- Awards: 1997 IEEE Fellow
- Scientific career
- Fields: Radar
- Workplaces: Georgia Tech Research Institute

Robert N. Trebits was a researcher in radar-related technologies, and was director of the Sensors and Electromagnetic Applications Laboratory at the Georgia Tech Research Institute (GTRI) from around 1991 until 2006 (15 years) and worked at GTRI from 1972 to 2006 (35 years).

== Education ==
Trebits held a Ph.D. from the Georgia Institute of Technology.

== Career ==
Trebits joined the Georgia Tech Research Institute in 1972, and became the director of the Sensors and Electromagnetic Applications Laboratory around 1991. He retired from GTRI in 2006.

Trebits has since been an adjunct professor at the Southern Polytechnic State University.

== Memberships and awards ==
Trebits was involved in SPIE, in particular being the editor of several publications. In 1997, he was named an IEEE Fellow "for contributions and leadership in measuring and characterizing millimeter radar reflectivity and propagation effects".
