= Self-focusing transducers =

Acoustic waves emitted by ultrasonics transducer crystals exhibit a property known as self-focusing (or natural focusing). Note that this is distinct from the electronically controlled focusing employed in diagnostic ultrasound devices which employ arrays of transducers. The self-focusing effect exists even for a single crystal.

Self-focusing refers to the narrowing of the ultrasonic beam in the near-field. The effect occurs because, if the ultrasound wave generated by the crystal is coherent, the edges of the emitting surface generate wavelets that constructively interfere with the plane wave that is generated.

The volume near the transducer which exhibits this phenomenon is called the near field, as opposed to the far field where wave intensity decays approximately exponentially. The near-field size is usually approximated by $D = \frac{d^2}{4 \lambda}$ where $d =$crystal diameter and $\lambda =$wavelength of the emitted wave. At the edge of the near-field, where the focusing reaches its maximum, the beam width reaches $\frac{d}{2}$. However, there exist techniques, such as apodization that may be used to reduce the near field size.
