= Richard C. Johnson =

- Born: 9 May 1930
- Died: 3 January 2003 (age 72)
- Education: Georgia Institute of Technology
- Scientific career
- Fields: Radar
- Workplaces: Georgia Tech Research Institute

Richard Clayton Johnson (9 May 1930 – 3 January 2003) was a researcher at the Georgia Tech Research Institute (GTRI) and the inventor of the Compact Antenna Range. He was also a professor of electrical engineering at the Georgia Institute of Technology., where he received his PhD in 1961.
