= Short backfire antenna =

Directional antenna

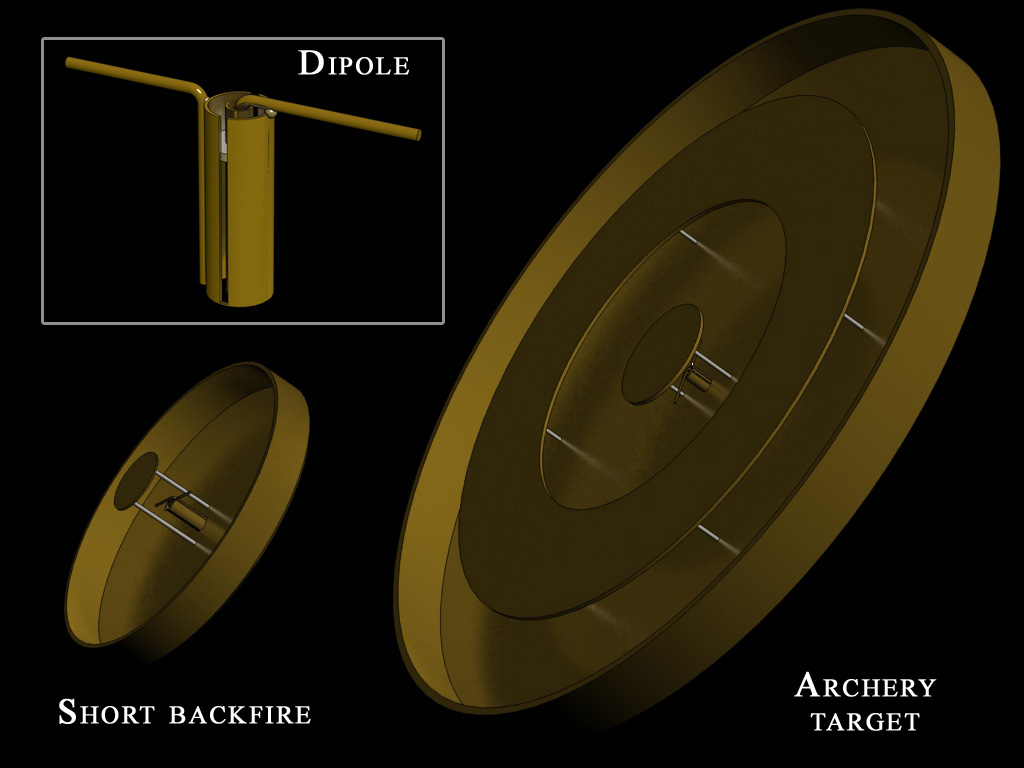
Comparison between the two antenna types.

A short backfire antenna (or short back-fire, SBA, SBF or SBFA) is a type of a directional antenna, characterized by high gain, relatively small size, and narrow band.

It has a shape of a disc with a straight edge, with a vertical pillar with a dipole acting as the driven element in roughly the middle and a conductive disc at the top acting as a sub-reflector. The bottom disc has the diameter of two wavelengths, and its collar (edge) is quarter the wavelength tall. The center pillar consists of two coaxial tubes (their diameter has to be carefully chosen to give the desired impedance), with a quarter-wavelength slot cut into the outer tube.

This structure behaves like a resonant cavity, resulting in a substantial gain in small space.

Short backfire antennas are used in some satellites, and in high-frequency (short-wavelength) communication equipment (often for communication with satellites) on ships and other applications where rugged construction is an advantage. They are also used for wireless LANs. The SBF antenna was invented by Dr. Hermann W. Ehrenspeck of Air Force Cambridge Research Labs based at Hanscom Air Force Base in Bedford, MA and was used for, among other purposes, to provide Tactical Satellite Communications for U.S. Army ground forces due to the SBF's portability and gain.

The bandwidth of the antenna can be increased by using a conical main reflector instead of a flat one.

Archery target antenna is an evolution of the short-backfire antenna. The name is derived from its appearance. Its base diameter is 5 wavelengths (5 λ), the rim height is 0.7 λ, the diameter of the small center reflector is 0.7 λ, its height above the base is 0.7 λ as well, the height of the dipole above the base is 0.35 λ, there is one more reflector - an annular reflector - at the same height as the center reflector, with inner diameter 2.2 λ and outer diameter 3.7 λ.

Short backfire antennas are able to achieve high aperture efficiencies, at right cavity size even beyond 100%.

== See also ==
- FRARS: 2.4 GHz short backfire antenna
