= Electromagnetic radiation =

Physical model of propagating energy

A linearly polarized electromagnetic wave going in the z-axis, with E denoting the electric field and perpendicular B denoting magnetic field

In physics, electromagnetic radiation (EMR) or an electromagnetic wave (EMW) is a self-propagating wave of the electromagnetic field that carries momentum and radiant energy through space. It encompasses a broad spectrum, classified by frequency (inversely proportional to wavelength), ranging from radio waves, microwaves, infrared, visible light, ultraviolet, X-rays, to gamma rays. All forms of EMR travel at the speed of light in a vacuum and exhibit wave–particle duality, behaving both as waves and as discrete particles called photons.

Electromagnetic radiation is produced by accelerating charged particles such as from the Sun and other celestial bodies or artificially generated for various applications. Its interaction with matter depends on wavelength, influencing its uses in communication, medicine, industry, and scientific research. Radio waves enable broadcasting and wireless communication, infrared is used in thermal imaging, visible light is essential for vision, and higher-energy radiation, such as X-rays and gamma rays, is applied in medical imaging, cancer treatment, and industrial inspection. Higher energy EMR, especially in the UV and above, has been associated with negative health effects.

In quantum mechanics, an alternate way of viewing EMR is that it consists of photons, uncharged elementary particles with zero rest mass which are the quanta of the electromagnetic field, responsible for all electromagnetic interactions. Quantum electrodynamics is the theory of how EMR interacts with matter on an atomic level. Quantum effects provide additional sources of EMR, such as the transition of electrons to lower energy levels in an atom and black-body radiation.

== Physics ==
=== Properties ===
The relative wavelengths of the electromagnetic waves of three different colours of light (blue, green, and red) with a distance scale in micrometers along the x-axis

Electromagnetic radiation is produced by accelerating charged particles and can be naturally emitted, as from the Sun and other celestial bodies, or artificially generated for various applications. The energy in electromagnetic waves is sometimes referred to as radiant energy. The electromagnetic waves' energy does not need a propagating medium to travel through space; they move through a vacuum at the speed of light.

Electromagnetic waves can be imagined as a self-propagating transverse oscillating wave of electric and magnetic fields. This 3D animation shows a plane linearly polarized wave propagating from left to right. The electric and magnetic fields in such a wave are in phase with each other, reaching minima and maxima together.

Electric and magnetic fields obey the properties of superposition. Thus, a field due to any particular particle or time-varying electric or magnetic field contributes to the fields present in the same space due to other causes. Further, as they are vector fields, all magnetic and electric field vectors add together according to vector addition. For example, in optics two or more coherent light waves may interact and by constructive or destructive interference yield a resultant irradiance deviating from the sum of the component irradiances of the individual light waves. The electromagnetic fields of light are not affected by traveling through static electric or magnetic fields in a linear medium such as a vacuum. However, in nonlinear media, such as some crystals, interactions can occur between light and static electric and magnetic fields—these interactions include the Faraday effect and the Kerr effect.

In refraction, a wave crossing from one medium to another of different density alters its speed and direction upon entering the new medium. The ratio of the refractive indices of the media determines the degree of refraction, and is summarized by Snell's law. Light of composite wavelengths (natural sunlight) disperses into a visible spectrum passing through a prism, because of the wavelength-dependent refractive index of the prism material (dispersion); that is, each component wave within the composite light is bent a different amount.

EM radiation exhibits both wave properties and particle properties at the same time (known as wave–particle duality). Both wave and particle characteristics have been confirmed in many experiments. Wave characteristics are more apparent when EM radiation is measured over relatively large timescales and over large distances while particle characteristics are more evident when measuring small timescales and distances. For example, when electromagnetic radiation is absorbed by matter, particle-like properties will be more obvious when the average number of photons in the cube of the relevant wavelength is much smaller than 1. It is not so difficult to experimentally observe non-uniform deposition of energy when light is absorbed, however this alone is not evidence of "particulate" behavior. Rather, it reflects the quantum nature of matter. A quantum theory of the interaction between electromagnetic radiation and matter such as electrons is described by the theory of quantum electrodynamics.

Electromagnetic waves can be polarized, reflected, refracted, or diffracted, and can interfere with each other. Some experiments display both the wave and particle natures of electromagnetic waves, such as the self-interference of a single photon. When a low intensity light is sent through an interferometer it will be detected by a photomultiplier or other sensitive detector only along one arm of the device, consistent with particle properties, and yet the accumulated effect of many such detections will be interference consistent with wave properties.

=== Wave model ===
Representation of the electric field vector of a wave of circularly polarized electromagnetic radiation

In homogeneous, isotropic media, electromagnetic radiation is a transverse wave, meaning that its oscillations are perpendicular to the direction of energy transfer and travel. It comes from the following equations:
$$\begin{align}
\nabla \cdot \mathbf{E}  &= 0\\
\nabla \cdot \mathbf{B}  &= 0
\end{align}$$
These equations predicate that any electromagnetic wave must be a transverse wave, where the electric field E and the magnetic field B are both perpendicular to the direction of wave propagation. The electric and magnetic parts of the field in an electromagnetic wave stand in a fixed ratio of strengths to satisfy the two Maxwell's equations that specify how one is produced from the other. In dissipation-less (lossless) media, these E and B fields are also in phase, with both reaching maxima and minima at the same points in space.

In the far-field EM radiation which is described by the two source-free Maxwell curl operator equations, a time-change in one type of field is proportional to the curl of the other. These derivatives require that the E and B fields in EMR are in phase. An important aspect of light's nature is its frequency. The frequency of a wave is its rate of oscillation and is measured in hertz, the SI unit of frequency, where one hertz is equal to one oscillation per second. Light usually has multiple frequencies that sum to form the resultant wave. Different frequencies undergo different angles of refraction, a phenomenon known as dispersion.

A monochromatic wave (a wave of a single frequency) consists of successive troughs and crests, and the distance between two adjacent crests or troughs is called the wavelength. Waves of the electromagnetic spectrum vary in size, from very long radio waves longer than a continent to very short gamma rays smaller than atom nuclei. Frequency is inversely proportional to wavelength, according to the equation:

$$\displaystyle v=f\lambda$$

where v is the speed of the wave (c in a vacuum or less in other media), f is the frequency, and λ is the wavelength. As waves cross boundaries between different media, their speeds change but their frequencies remain constant.

Electromagnetic waves in free space must be solutions of Maxwell's electromagnetic wave equation. Two main classes of solutions are known, namely plane waves and spherical waves. The plane waves may be viewed as the limiting case of spherical waves at a very large (ideally infinite) distance from the source. Both types of waves can have a waveform which is an arbitrary time function (so long as it is sufficiently differentiable to conform to the wave equation). As with any time function, this can be decomposed by means of Fourier analysis into its frequency spectrum, or individual sinusoidal components, each of which contains a single frequency, amplitude, and phase. Such a component wave is said to be monochromatic.

Interference is the superposition of two or more waves resulting in a new wave pattern. If the fields have components in the same direction, they constructively interfere, while opposite directions cause destructive interference. Additionally, multiple polarization signals can be combined (i.e. interfered) to form new states of polarization, which is known as parallel polarization state generation.

=== Maxwell's equations ===
James Clerk Maxwell derived a wave form of the electric and magnetic equations, thus uncovering the wave-like nature of electric and magnetic fields and their symmetry. Because the speed of EM waves predicted by the wave equation coincided with the measured speed of light, Maxwell concluded that light itself is an EM wave. Maxwell's equations were confirmed by Heinrich Hertz through experiments with radio waves. Out of the four equations, two of the equations that Maxwell refined were Faraday's Law of Induction and Ampère's circuital law, which he extended by adding the displacement current term to the equations himself. Maxwell thought that the displacement current, which he viewed as the motion of bound charges, gave rise to the magnetic field. The other two equations are Gauss's law and Gauss's law for magnetism.

=== Field equations ===
The existence of electromagnetic radiation is predicted by Maxwell's equations. The solutions to these equations can be written in various forms, with one called the Panofsky–Phillips equations being useful for teaching the topic. For a charge density $\rho$ and a current density $\mathbf{J}$, electric field is:
$$\definecolor{vert}{RGB}{0,153,0}
\mathbf{E}
=
\frac{1}{4\pi\varepsilon_0}\,
\displaystyle\iiint
\left(
{\color{vert}
\frac{[\rho]\mathbf{n}}{r^2}
+
\frac{
\left(\left[\mathbf{J}\right]\cdot\mathbf{n}\right)\mathbf{n}
+
\left(\left[\mathbf{J}\right]\times\mathbf{n}\right)\times\mathbf{n}
}{c\,r^2}
}
\mathbin{\color{red}{+}}
{\color{red}
\frac{
\left(\left[\dot{\mathbf{J}}\right]\times\mathbf{n}\right)\times\mathbf{n}
}{c^2 r}
}
\right)
\, dV'$$
where $\mathbf{n} = \mathbf{R}/|R|$ and dot is the time derivative. The magnetic field is:
$$\definecolor{vert}{RGB}{0,153,0}
\mathbf{B}
=
\frac{1}{4\pi\varepsilon_0}\,
\displaystyle\iiint
\left(
{\color{vert}
\frac{\left[\mathbf{J}\right]\times\mathbf{n}}{c^2 r^2}
}
\mathbin{\color{red}{+}}
{\color{red}
\frac{\left[\dot{\mathbf{J}}\right]\times\mathbf{n}}{c^3 r}
}
\right)
\, dV'$$

- In green are the near fields (decaying as 1/r²).
- In red are the radiated fields (decaying as 1/r).

In the far-field region where $r$ is large, the terms with $1/r^2$, known as near field terms can be neglected compared to the terms with $1/r$. Then expressions of the emitted fields reduce to:

$$\mathbf{E}=\frac{1}{4\pi\varepsilon_0 c^2}\,\displaystyle\iiint\left(\frac{\left(\left[\dot{\mathbf{J}}\right]\times\mathbf{n}\right)\times\mathbf{n}}{r}\right)\, dV'$$
$$\mathbf{B}=\frac{1}{4\pi\varepsilon_0 c^3}\,\displaystyle\iiint\left(\frac{\left[\dot{\mathbf{J}}\right]\times\mathbf{n}}{r}\right)\, dV'$$

The electric field is perpendicular to the magnetic field, and both are tranverse to the direction of propagation given by $\mathbf{n}$. Symbolically $\mathbf{E}\perp\mathbf{B}\perp\mathbf{n}$, with E and B related by:
$$\mathbf{B}
=
\frac{\mathbf{n}\times\mathbf{E}}{c}$$
These fields propagate through space at the speed of light, i.e. at 299,792,458 m/s.

=== Near and far fields ===
In electromagnetic radiation (such as microwaves from an antenna, shown here) the term radiation applies only to the parts of the electromagnetic field that radiate into infinite space and decrease in intensity by an inverse-square law of power, such that the total energy that crosses through an imaginary sphere surrounding the source is the same regardless of the size of the sphere. Electromagnetic radiation thus reaches the far part of the electromagnetic field around a transmitter. A part of the near field (close to the transmitter) includes the changing electromagnetic field, but that is not electromagnetic radiation.

Maxwell's equations established that some charges and currents (sources) produce local electromagnetic fields near them that do not radiate. Currents directly produce magnetic fields of a magnetic-dipole–type that die out with distance from the current. In a similar manner, moving charges pushed apart in a conductor by a changing electrical potential (such as in an antenna) produce an electric-dipole–type electrical field, but this also declines with distance. These fields make up the near field. Neither of these behaviours is responsible for EM radiation. Instead, they only efficiently transfer energy to a receiver very close to the source, such as inside a transformer. The near field has strong effects on its source, with any energy withdrawn by a receiver causing increased load (decreased electrical reactance) on the source. The near field does not propagate freely into space, carrying energy away without a distance limit, but rather oscillates, returning its energy to the transmitter if it is not absorbed by a receiver.

By contrast, the far field is composed of radiation that is free of the transmitter, in the sense that the transmitter requires the same power to send changes in the field out regardless of whether anything absorbs the signal, e.g. a radio station does not need to increase its power when more receivers use the signal. This far part of the electromagnetic field is electromagnetic radiation. The far fields propagate (radiate) without allowing the transmitter to affect them. This causes them to be independent in the sense that their existence and their energy, after they have left the transmitter, is completely independent of both transmitter and receiver. Due to conservation of energy, the amount of power passing through any closed surface drawn around the source is the same. The power density of EM radiation from an isotropic source decreases with the inverse square of the distance from the source; this is called the inverse-square law. Field intensity due to dipole parts of the near field varies according to an inverse-cube law, and thus fades with distance.

In the Liénard–Wiechert potential formulation of the electric and magnetic fields due to motion of a single particle (according to Maxwell's equations), the terms associated with acceleration of the particle are those that are responsible for the part of the field that is regarded as electromagnetic radiation. By contrast, the term associated with the changing static electric field of the particle and the magnetic term that results from the particle's uniform velocity are both associated with the near field, and do not comprise electromagnetic radiation.

=== Particle model and quantum theory ===
An anomaly arose in the late 19th century involving a contradiction between the wave theory of light and measurements of the electromagnetic spectra that were being emitted by thermal radiators known as black bodies. Physicists struggled with this problem unsuccessfully for many years, and it later became known as the ultraviolet catastrophe. In 1900, Max Planck developed a new theory of black-body radiation that explained the observed spectrum. Planck's theory was based on the idea that black bodies emit light (and other electromagnetic radiation) only as discrete bundles or packets of energy. These packets were called quanta. In 1905, Albert Einstein proposed that light quanta be regarded as real particles. Later the particle of light was given the name photon, to correspond with other particles being described around this time, such as the electron and proton. A photon has an energy, E, proportional to its frequency, f, by

$$E = hf = \frac{hc}{\lambda} \,\!$$

where h is the Planck constant, $\lambda$ is the wavelength and c is the speed of light. This is sometimes known as the Planck–Einstein equation. In quantum theory (see first quantization) the energy of the photons is thus directly proportional to the frequency of the EMR wave. Likewise, the momentum p of a photon is also proportional to its frequency and inversely proportional to its wavelength:

$$p = { E \over c } = { hf \over c } = { h \over \lambda }.$$

The source of Einstein's proposal that light was composed of particles (or could act as particles in some circumstances) was an experimental anomaly not explained by the wave theory: the photoelectric effect, in which light striking a metal surface ejected electrons from the surface, causing an electric current to flow across an applied voltage. Experimental measurements demonstrated that the energy of individual ejected electrons was proportional to the frequency, rather than the intensity, of the light. Furthermore, below a certain minimum frequency, which depended on the particular metal, no current would flow regardless of the intensity. These observations appeared to contradict the wave theory, and for years physicists tried to find an explanation. In 1905, Einstein explained this phenomenon by resurrecting the particle theory of light. Because of the preponderance of evidence in favor of the wave theory, however, Einstein's ideas were met initially with great skepticism among established physicists. Eventually Einstein's explanation was accepted as new particle-like behavior of light was observed, such as the Compton effect.

As a photon is absorbed by an atom, it excites the atom, elevating an electron to a higher energy level (one that is on average farther from the nucleus). When an electron in an excited molecule or atom descends to a lower energy level, it emits a photon of light at a frequency corresponding to the energy difference. Since the energy levels of electrons in atoms are discrete, each element and each molecule emits and absorbs its own characteristic frequencies. Immediate photon emission is called fluorescence, a type of photoluminescence. An example is visible light emitted from fluorescent paints, in response to ultraviolet (blacklight). Many other fluorescent emissions are known in spectral bands other than visible light. Delayed emission is called phosphorescence.

Quantum mechanics also governs emission, which is seen when an emitting gas glows due to excitation of the atoms from any mechanism, including heat. As electrons descend to lower energy levels, a spectrum is emitted that represents the jumps between the energy levels of the electrons, but lines are seen because again emission happens only at particular energies after excitation. An example is the emission spectrum of nebulae. Rapidly moving electrons are most sharply accelerated when they encounter a region of force, so they are responsible for producing much of the highest frequency electromagnetic radiation observed in nature. These phenomena can be used to detect the composition of gases lit from behind (absorption spectra) and for glowing gases (emission spectra). Spectroscopy (for example) determines what chemical elements comprise a particular star. Shifts in the frequency of the spectral lines for an element, called a redshift, can be used to determine the star's cosmological distance.

=== Wave–particle duality ===
The modern theory that explains the nature of light includes the notion of wave–particle duality. The theory is based on the concept that every quantum entity can show wave-like or particle-like behaviors, depending on observation. The observation led to the collapse of the entity's wave function. If it is based on the Copenhagen interpretation, the observation does really collapse the wave function; for the many-worlds interpretation, all possible outcomes of the collapse happened in parallel universes; for the pilot wave theory, the particle behaviour is simply determined by waves. The duality nature of a real photon has been observed in the double-slit experiment.

Together, wave and particle effects fully explain the emission and absorption spectra of EM radiation. The matter-composition of the medium through which the light travels determines the nature of the absorption and emission spectrum. These bands correspond to the allowed energy levels in the atoms. Dark bands in the absorption spectrum are due to the atoms in an intervening medium between source and observer. The atoms absorb certain frequencies of the light between emitter and detector/eye, then emit them in all directions. A dark band appears to the detector, due to the radiation scattered out of the light beam. For instance, dark bands in the light emitted by a distant star are due to the atoms in the star's atmosphere.

=== Propagation speed ===
In empty space (vacuum), electromagnetic radiation travels at the speed of light, $c$, 299,792,458 meters per second (approximately 186,000 miles per second). In a medium other than vacuum it travels at a lower velocity $v$, given by a dimensionless parameter between 0 and 1 characteristic of the medium called the velocity factor $\mathit{VF}$ or its reciprocal, the refractive index $n$:

$$v = \mathit{VF} \cdot c = {c \over n}$$.

The reason for this is that in matter the electric and magnetic fields of the wave are slowed because they polarize the charged particles in the medium they pass through. The oscillating electric field causes nearby positive and negative charges in atoms to move slightly apart and together, inducing an oscillating polarization, creating an electric polarization field. The oscillating magnetic field moves nearby magnetic dipoles, inducing an oscillating magnetization, creating an induced oscillating magnetic field. These induced fields, superposed on the original wave fields, slow the wave (Ewald–Oseen extinction theorem). The amount of slowing depends on the electromagnetic properties of the medium, the electric permittivity and magnetic permeability. In the SI system of units, empty space has a vacuum permittivity of $\epsilon_\text{0} =$ 8.854×10^{−12} F/m (farads per meter) and a vacuum permeability of $\mu_\text{0} =$ 1.257×10^{−6} H/m (henries per meter). These universal constants determine the speed of light in a vacuum:

$$c = {1 \over \sqrt{\epsilon_\text{0}\mu_\text{0}}}$$

In a medium that is isotropic and linear, which means the electric polarization is proportional to the electric field $\mathbf{D} = \epsilon\mathbf{E}$ and the magnetization is proportional to the magnetic field $\mathbf{H} = {1 \over \mu}\mathbf{B}$. The speed of the waves, the $\mathit{VF}$, and the refractive index are determined by only two parameters: the electric permittivity $\epsilon$ of the medium in farads per meter, and the magnetic permeability of the medium $\mu$ in henrys per meter

$$v = {1 \over \sqrt{\epsilon\mu}}$$
$$n = {1 \over \mathit{VF}} = c\sqrt{\epsilon\mu} = \sqrt{{\epsilon\mu \over \epsilon_\text{0}\mu_\text{0}}}$$

If the permittivity and permeability of the medium is constant for different frequency EM waves, this is called a non-dispersive medium. In this case all EM wave frequencies would travel at the same velocity, and the waveshape stays constant as it travels. However in real matter $\epsilon$ and $\mu$ typically vary with frequency, this is called a dispersive medium. In dispersive media different spectral bands have different propagation characteristics, and an arbitrary wave changes shape as it travels through the medium.

== History of discovery ==
Electromagnetic radiation of wavelengths other than those of visible light were discovered in the early 19th century. The discovery of infrared radiation is ascribed to astronomer William Herschel, who published his results in 1800 before the Royal Society of London. Herschel used a glass prism to refract light from the Sun and detected invisible rays that caused heating beyond the red part of the spectrum, through an increase in the temperature recorded with a thermometer. These "calorific rays" were later termed infrared.

In 1801 German physicist Johann Wilhelm Ritter discovered ultraviolet in an experiment similar to Herschel's, using sunlight and a glass prism. Ritter noted that invisible rays near the violet edge of a solar spectrum dispersed by a triangular prism darkened silver chloride preparations more quickly than did the nearby violet light. Ritter's experiments were an early precursor to what would become photography. Ritter noted that the ultraviolet rays (which at first were called "chemical rays") were capable of causing chemical reactions.

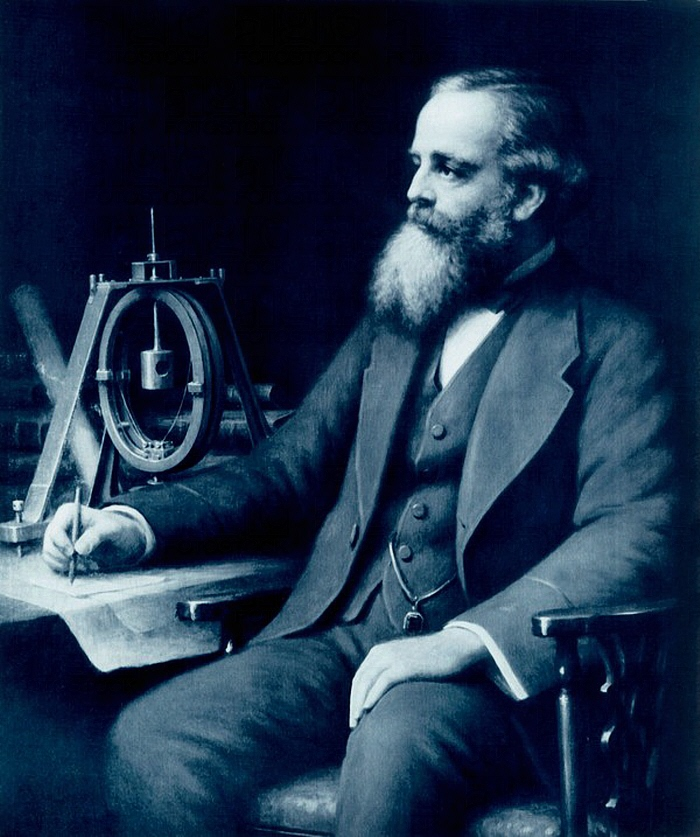
James Clerk Maxwell (1831–1879)

In 1862–64 James Clerk Maxwell developed equations for the electromagnetic field which suggested that waves in the field would travel with a speed that was very close to the known speed of light. Maxwell therefore suggested that visible light (as well as invisible infrared and ultraviolet rays by inference) all consisted of propagating disturbances (or radiation) in the electromagnetic field. Radio waves were first produced deliberately by Heinrich Hertz in 1887, using electrical circuits calculated to produce oscillations at a much lower frequency than that of visible light, following recipes for producing oscillating charges and currents suggested by Maxwell's equations. Hertz also developed ways to detect these waves, and produced and characterized what were later termed radio waves and microwaves.

Wilhelm Röntgen discovered and named X-rays. After experimenting with high voltages applied to an evacuated tube on 8 November 1895, he noticed a fluorescence on a nearby plate of coated glass. In one month, he discovered X-rays' main properties.

The last portion of the EM spectrum to be discovered was associated with radioactivity. Henri Becquerel found that uranium salts caused fogging of an unexposed photographic plate through a covering paper in a manner similar to X-rays, and Marie Curie discovered that only certain elements gave off these rays of energy, soon discovering the intense radiation of radium. The radiation from pitchblende was differentiated into alpha rays (alpha particles) and beta rays (beta particles) by Ernest Rutherford through simple experimentation in 1899, but these proved to be charged particulate types of radiation. However, in 1900 the French scientist Paul Villard discovered a third neutrally charged and especially penetrating type of radiation from radium, and after he described it, Rutherford realized it must be yet a third type of radiation, which in 1903 Rutherford named gamma rays.

In 1910 British physicist William Henry Bragg demonstrated that gamma rays are electromagnetic radiation, not particles, and in 1914 Rutherford and Edward Andrade measured their wavelengths, finding that they were similar to X-rays but with shorter wavelengths and higher frequency, although a 'cross-over' between X and gamma rays makes it possible to have X-rays with a higher energy (and hence shorter wavelength) than gamma rays and vice versa. The origin of the ray differentiates them, gamma rays tend to be natural phenomena originating from the unstable nucleus of an atom and X-rays are electrically generated (and hence man-made) unless they are as a result of bremsstrahlung X-radiation caused by the interaction of fast moving particles (such as beta particles) colliding with certain materials, usually of higher atomic numbers.

== Electromagnetic spectrum ==
Electromagnetic spectrum with visible light highlighted. The bottom graph (visible spectrum) shows wavelength in units of nanometers (nm).

Legend: γ = Gamma rays HX = Hard X-rays SX = Soft X-rays EUV = Extreme-ultraviolet NUV = Near-ultraviolet Visible light (colored bands) NIR = Near-infrared MIR = Mid-infrared FIR = Far-infrared EHF = Extremely high frequency (microwaves) SHF = Super-high frequency (microwaves) UHF = Ultrahigh frequency (radio waves) VHF = Very high frequency (radio) HF = High frequency (radio) MF = Medium frequency (radio) LF = Low frequency (radio) VLF = Very low frequency (radio) VF = Voice frequency ULF = Ultra-low frequency (radio) SLF = Super-low frequency (radio) ELF = Extremely low frequency (radio)

EM radiation (the designation 'radiation' excludes static electric and magnetic and near fields) is classified by wavelength into radio, microwave, infrared, visible, ultraviolet, X-rays, and gamma rays. Arbitrary electromagnetic waves can be expressed by Fourier analysis in terms of sinusoidal waves (monochromatic radiation), which in turn can each be classified into these regions of the EMR spectrum.

For certain classes of EM waves, the waveform is most usefully treated as random, and then spectral analysis must be done by slightly different mathematical techniques appropriate to random or stochastic processes. In such cases, the individual frequency components are represented in terms of their power content, and the phase information is not preserved. Such a representation is called the power spectral density of the random process. Random electromagnetic radiation requiring this kind of analysis is, for example, encountered in the interior of stars, and in certain other very wideband forms of radiation such as the zero-point wave field of the electromagnetic vacuum.

The behavior of EM radiation and its interaction with matter depends on its frequency, and changes qualitatively as the frequency changes. Lower frequencies have longer wavelengths, and higher frequencies have shorter wavelengths, and are associated with photons of higher energy. There is no fundamental limit known to these wavelengths or energies, at either end of the spectrum, although photons with energies near the Planck energy or exceeding it (far too high to have ever been observed) will require new physical theories to describe.

=== Radio and microwave ===
Electromagnetic radiation phenomena with wavelengths ranging from one meter to one millimeter are called microwaves; with frequencies between 300 MHz (0.3 GHz) and 300 GHz. When radio waves impinge upon a conductor, they couple to the conductor, travel along it, and induce an electric current on the conductor surface by moving the electrons of the conducting material in correlated bunches of charge. At radio and microwave frequencies, EMR interacts with matter largely as a bulk collection of charges which are spread out over large numbers of affected atoms. In electrical conductors, such induced bulk movement of charges (electric currents) results in absorption of the EMR, or else separations of charges that cause generation of new EMR (effective reflection of the EMR). An example is absorption or emission of radio waves by antennas, or absorption of microwaves by water or other molecules with an electric dipole moment, as for example inside a microwave oven. These interactions produce either electric currents or heat, or both.

=== Infrared ===
Like radio and microwave, infrared (IR) is reflected by metals (and also most EMR, well into the ultraviolet range). However, unlike lower-frequency radio and microwave radiation, infrared EMR commonly interacts with dipoles present in single molecules, which change as atoms vibrate at the ends of a single chemical bond. It is consequently absorbed by a wide range of substances, causing them to increase in temperature as the vibrations dissipate as heat. The same process, run in reverse, causes bulk substances to radiate in the infrared spontaneously (see thermal radiation section below).

Infrared radiation is divided into spectral subregions. While different subdivision schemes exist, the spectrum is commonly divided as near-infrared (0.75–1.4 μm), short-wavelength infrared (1.4–3 μm), mid-wavelength infrared (3–8 μm), long-wavelength infrared (8–15 μm) and far infrared (15–1000 μm).

Some animals, such as snakes, have thermo-sensitive membranes (pit organs) that can detect temperature differences, allowing them to sense infrared radiation.

=== Visible light ===
Natural sources produce EM radiation across the spectrum. EM radiation with a wavelength between approximately 400 nm and 700 nm is directly detected by the human eye and perceived as visible light. Other wavelengths, especially nearby infrared (longer than 700 nm) and ultraviolet (shorter than 400 nm) are also sometimes referred to as light.

As frequency increases into the visible range, photons have enough energy to change the bond structure of some individual molecules. It is not a coincidence that this happens in the visible range, as the mechanism of vision involves the change in bonding of a single molecule, retinal, which absorbs a single photon. The change in retinal causes a change in the shape of the rhodopsin protein it is contained in, which starts the biochemical process that causes the retina of the human eye to sense the light.

Visible light is able to affect only a tiny percentage of all molecules. Usually not in a permanent or damaging way, rather the photon excites an electron which then emits another photon when returning to its original position. This is the source of color produced by most dyes. Retinal is an exception. When a photon is absorbed, the retinal permanently changes structure from cis to trans, and requires a protein to convert it back, i.e. reset it to be able to function as a light detector again.

Photosynthesis becomes possible in this range as well, for the same reason. A single molecule of chlorophyll is excited by a single photon. In plant tissues that conduct photosynthesis, carotenoids act to quench electronically excited chlorophyll produced by visible light in a process called non-photochemical quenching, to prevent reactions that would otherwise interfere with photosynthesis at high light levels.

Limited evidence indicate that some reactive oxygen species are created by visible light in skin, and that these may have some role in photoaging, in the same manner as ultraviolet A.

Infrared, microwaves, and radio waves are known to damage molecules and biological tissue only by bulk heating, not excitation from single photons of the radiation.

=== Ultraviolet ===
As frequency increases into the ultraviolet, photons now carry enough energy (about three electron volts or more) to excite certain doubly bonded molecules into permanent chemical rearrangement. In DNA, this causes lasting damage. DNA is also indirectly damaged by reactive oxygen species produced by ultraviolet A (UVA), which has energy too low to damage DNA directly. This is why ultraviolet at all wavelengths can damage DNA, and is capable of causing cancer, and (for UVB) skin burns (sunburn) that are far worse than would be produced by simple heating (temperature increase) effects.

At the higher end of the ultraviolet range, the energy of photons becomes large enough to impart enough energy to electrons to cause them to be liberated from the atom, in a process called photoionisation. The energy required for this is always larger than about 10 electron volt (eV) corresponding with wavelengths smaller than 124 nm (some sources suggest a more realistic cutoff of 33 eV, which is the energy required to ionize water). This high end of the ultraviolet spectrum with energies in the approximate ionization range, is sometimes called "extreme UV". Ionizing UV is strongly filtered by the Earth's atmosphere.

=== X-rays and gamma rays ===
Electromagnetic radiation composed of photons that carry minimum-ionization energy, or more (which includes the entire spectrum with shorter wavelengths), is therefore termed ionizing radiation. (Many other kinds of ionizing radiation are made of non-EM particles.) Electromagnetic-type ionizing radiation extends from the extreme ultraviolet to all higher frequencies and shorter wavelengths, which means that all X-rays and gamma rays qualify. These are capable of the most severe types of molecular damage, which can happen in biology to any type of biomolecule, including mutation and cancer, and often at great depths below the skin, since the higher end of the X-ray spectrum, and all of the gamma ray spectrum, penetrate matter.

== Atmosphere and magnetosphere ==
Rough plot of Earth's atmospheric absorption and scattering (or opacity) of various wavelengths of electromagnetic radiation

Most UV and X-rays are blocked by absorption first from molecular nitrogen, and then (for wavelengths in the upper UV) from the electronic excitation of dioxygen and finally ozone at the mid-range of UV. Only 30% of the Sun's ultraviolet light reaches the ground, and almost all of this is well transmitted.

Visible light is well transmitted in air, a property known as an atmospheric window, as it is not energetic enough to excite nitrogen, oxygen, or ozone, but too energetic to excite molecular vibrational frequencies of water vapor and carbon dioxide. Absorption bands in the infrared are due to modes of vibrational excitation in water vapor. However, at energies too low to excite water vapor, the atmosphere becomes transparent again, allowing free transmission of most microwave and radio waves.

Finally, at radio wavelengths longer than 10 m or so (about 30 MHz), the air in the lower atmosphere remains transparent to radio, but plasma in certain layers of the ionosphere begins to interact with radio waves (see skywave). This property allows some longer wavelengths (100 m or 3 MHz) to be reflected and results in shortwave radio beyond line-of-sight. However, certain ionospheric effects begin to block incoming radiowaves from space, when their frequency is less than about 10 MHz (wavelength longer than about 30 m).

== Thermal and electromagnetic radiation as a form of heat ==
The basic structure of matter involves charged particles bound together. When electromagnetic radiation impinges on matter, it causes the charged particles to oscillate and gain energy. The ultimate fate of this energy depends on the context. It could be immediately re-radiated and appear as scattered, reflected, or transmitted radiation. It may get dissipated into other microscopic motions within the matter, coming to thermal equilibrium and manifesting itself as thermal energy, or even kinetic energy, in the material. With a few exceptions related to high-energy photons (such as fluorescence, harmonic generation, photochemical reactions, the photovoltaic effect for ionizing radiations at far ultraviolet, X-ray, and gamma radiation), absorbed electromagnetic radiation simply deposits its energy by heating the material. This happens for infrared, microwave, and radio wave radiation.

Intense radio waves can thermally burn living tissue and can cook food. In addition to infrared lasers, sufficiently intense visible and ultraviolet lasers can easily set paper afire. Ionizing radiation creates high-speed electrons in a material and breaks chemical bonds, but after these electrons collide many times with other atoms eventually most of the energy becomes thermal energy all in a tiny fraction of a second. This caveat also applies to UV, even though almost all of it is not ionizing, because UV can damage molecules due to electronic excitation, which is far greater per unit energy than heating effects.

Infrared radiation in the spectral distribution of a black body is usually considered a form of heat, since it has an equivalent temperature and is associated with an entropy change per unit of thermal energy. However, "heat" is a technical term in physics and thermodynamics and is often confused with thermal energy. Any type of electromagnetic energy can be transformed into thermal energy in interaction with matter. Thus, any electromagnetic radiation can "heat" (in the sense of increase the thermal energy temperature of) a material, when it is absorbed. The inverse or time-reversed process of absorption is thermal radiation. Much of the thermal energy in matter consists of random motion of charged particles, and this energy can be radiated away from the matter. The resulting radiation may subsequently be absorbed by another piece of matter, with the deposited energy heating the material.

The electromagnetic radiation in an opaque cavity at thermal equilibrium is effectively a form of thermal energy, having maximum radiation entropy.

== Biological effects ==
Bioelectromagnetics is the study of the interactions and effects of EM radiation on living organisms. The effects of electromagnetic radiation upon living cells, including those in humans, depends upon the radiation's power and frequency. For low-frequency radiation (radio waves to near ultraviolet) the best-understood effects are those due to radiation power alone, acting through heating when radiation is absorbed. For these thermal effects, frequency is important as it affects the intensity of the radiation and penetration into the organism (for example, microwaves penetrate better than infrared). It is widely accepted that low frequency fields that are too weak to cause significant heating could not possibly have any biological effect. Some research suggests that weaker non-thermal electromagnetic fields (including weak ELF magnetic fields, although the latter does not strictly qualify as EM radiation) and modulated RF and microwave fields can have biological effects, though the significance of this is unclear.

All UV frequencies have been classed as Group 1 carcinogens by the World Health Organization. Ultraviolet radiation from sun exposure is the primary cause of skin cancer, the most common type of cancer among fair-skinned people. UV radiation damages DNA and cells as well as causing mutations that block DNA repair. Visible and infrared light may increase photoaging, but sunscreens do not generally protect against these effects.

The World Health Organization has classified radio frequency electromagnetic radiation as Group 2B—possibly carcinogenic. This group contains possible carcinogens such as lead, coffee, and automobile exhaust.

=== Use as a weapon ===
The heat ray is an application of EMR that makes use of microwave frequencies to create an unpleasant heating effect in the upper layer of the skin. The heat ray weapon Active Denial System was developed by the US military as an experimental weapon to deny the enemy access to an area.

== Derivation from electromagnetic theory ==
Electromagnetic waves are predicted by the classical laws of electricity and magnetism, known as Maxwell's equations. There are nontrivial solutions of the homogeneous Maxwell's equations (without charges or currents), describing waves of changing electric and magnetic fields. Beginning with Maxwell's equations in free space:

$$\nabla \cdot \mathbf{E} = 0$$	1

$$\nabla \times \mathbf{E} = -\frac{\partial \mathbf{B}}{\partial t}$$	2

$$\nabla \cdot \mathbf{B} = 0$$	3

$$\nabla \times \mathbf{B} = \mu_0 \varepsilon_0 \frac{\partial \mathbf{E}}{\partial t}$$	4

where

- $\mathbf{E}$ and $\mathbf{B}$ are the electric field (measured in V/m or N/C) and the magnetic field (measured in T or Wb/m^{2}), respectively;
- $\nabla \cdot \mathbf X$ yields the divergence and $\nabla \times \mathbf X$ the curl of a vector field $\mathbf X$;
- $\frac{\partial \mathbf{B}}{\partial t}$ and $\frac{\partial \mathbf{E}}{\partial t}$ are partial derivatives (rate of change in time, with location fixed) of the magnetic and electric field;
- $\mu_0$ is the permeability of a vacuum (4π × 10^{−7} H/m), and $\varepsilon_0$ is the permittivity of a vacuum (8.85 × 10^{−12} F/m);

Besides the trivial solution $\mathbf{E} = \mathbf{B} = \mathbf{0}$, useful solutions can be derived with the following vector identity, valid for all vectors $\mathbf{A}$ in some vector field:
$$\nabla \times \left( \nabla \times \mathbf{A} \right) = \nabla \left( \nabla \cdot \mathbf{A} \right) - \nabla^2 \mathbf{A}.$$
Taking the curl of the second Maxwell's equation (2) yields:

$$\nabla \times \left(\nabla \times \mathbf{E} \right) = \nabla \times \left(-\frac{\partial \mathbf{B}}{\partial t} \right)$$	5

Evaluating the left hand side of (5) with the above identity and simplifying using (1), yields:

$$\nabla \times \left(\nabla \times \mathbf{E} \right) = \nabla\left(\nabla \cdot \mathbf{E} \right) - \nabla^2 \mathbf{E} = - \nabla^2 \mathbf{E}.$$	6

Evaluating the right hand side of (5) by exchanging the sequence of derivatives and inserting the fourth Maxwell's equation (4), yields:

$$\nabla \times \left(-\frac{\partial \mathbf{B}}{\partial t} \right) = -\frac{\partial}{\partial t} \left( \nabla \times \mathbf{B} \right) = -\mu_0 \varepsilon_0 \frac{\partial^2 \mathbf{E}}{\partial t^2}$$	7

Combining (6) and (7) again, gives a vector-valued differential equation for the electric field, solving the homogeneous Maxwell's equations:

$\nabla^2 \mathbf{E} = \mu_0 \varepsilon_0 \frac{\partial^2 \mathbf{E}}{\partial t^2}$

Taking the curl of the fourth Maxwell's equation (4) results in a similar differential equation for a magnetic field solving the homogeneous Maxwell's equations:

$\nabla^2 \mathbf{B} = \mu_0 \varepsilon_0 \frac{\partial^2 \mathbf{B}}{\partial t^2}.$

Both differential equations have the form of the general wave equation for waves propagating with speed $c_0,$ where $f$ is a function of time and location, which gives the amplitude of the wave at some time at a certain location:
$$\nabla^2 f = \frac{1}{{c_0}^2} \frac{\partial^2 f}{\partial t^2}$$
This is also written as:
$$\Box f = 0$$
where $\Box$ denotes the so-called d'Alembert operator, which in Cartesian coordinates is given as:
$$\Box = \nabla^2 - \frac{1}{{c_0}^2} \frac{\partial^2}{\partial t^2} = \frac{\partial^2}{\partial x^2} + \frac{\partial^2}{\partial y^2} + \frac{\partial^2}{\partial z^2} - \frac{1}{{c_0}^2} \frac{\partial^2}{\partial t^2} \$$

Comparing the terms for the speed of propagation, yields in the case of the electric and magnetic fields:
$$c_0 = \frac{1}{\sqrt{\mu_0 \varepsilon_0}}.$$

This is the speed of light in vacuum. Thus Maxwell's equations connect the vacuum permittivity $\varepsilon_0$, the vacuum permeability $\mu_0$, and the speed of light, c_{0}, via the above equation. This relationship had been discovered by Wilhelm Eduard Weber and Rudolf Kohlrausch prior to the development of Maxwell's electrodynamics, however Maxwell was the first to produce a field theory consistent with waves traveling at the speed of light.

These are only two equations versus the original four, so more information pertains to these waves hidden within Maxwell's equations. A generic vector wave for the electric field has the form
$$\mathbf{E} = \mathbf{E}_0 f{\left( \hat{\mathbf{k}} \cdot \mathbf{x} - c_0 t \right)}$$
Here, $\mathbf{E}_0$ is a constant vector, $f$ is any second differentiable function, $\hat{\mathbf{k}}$ is a unit vector in the direction of propagation, and ${\mathbf{x}}$ is a position vector. $f{\left( \hat{\mathbf{k}} \cdot \mathbf{x} - c_0 t \right)}$ is a generic solution to the wave equation. In other words,
$$\nabla^2 f{\left( \hat{\mathbf{k}} \cdot \mathbf{x} - c_0 t \right)} = \frac{1}{{c_0}^2} \frac{\partial^2}{\partial t^2} f{\left( \hat{\mathbf{k}} \cdot \mathbf{x} - c_0 t \right)},$$
for a generic wave traveling in the $\hat{\mathbf{k}}$ direction.

From the first of Maxwell's equations, we get
$$\nabla \cdot \mathbf{E} = \hat{\mathbf{k}} \cdot \mathbf{E}_0 f'{\left( \hat{\mathbf{k}} \cdot \mathbf{x} - c_0 t \right)} = 0$$
Thus,
$$\mathbf{E} \cdot \hat{\mathbf{k}} = 0$$
which implies that the electric field is orthogonal to the direction the wave propagates. The second of Maxwell's equations yields the magnetic field, namely,
$$\nabla \times \mathbf{E} = \hat{\mathbf{k}} \times \mathbf{E}_0 f'{\left( \hat{\mathbf{k}} \cdot \mathbf{x} - c_0 t \right)} = -\frac{\partial \mathbf{B}}{\partial t}$$
Thus,
$$\mathbf{B} = \frac{1}{c_0} \hat{\mathbf{k}} \times \mathbf{E}$$
The remaining equations will be satisfied by this choice of $\mathbf{E},\mathbf{B}$.

The electric and magnetic field waves in the far-field travel at the speed of light. They have a special restricted orientation and proportional magnitudes, $E_0 = c_0 B_0$, which can be seen immediately from the Poynting vector. The electric field, magnetic field, and direction of wave propagation are all orthogonal, and the wave propagates in the same direction as $\mathbf{E} \times \mathbf{B}$. Also E and B far-fields in free space, which as wave solutions depend primarily on these two Maxwell's equations to remain in phase with each other. This is guaranteed since the generic wave solution is first order in both space and time, and the curl operator on one side of these equations results in first-order spatial derivatives of the wave solution, while the time-derivative on the other side of the equations, which gives the other field, is first-order in time, resulting in the same phase shift for both fields in each mathematical operation.

From the viewpoint of an electromagnetic wave traveling forward, the electric field might be oscillating up and down, while the magnetic field oscillates right and left. This picture can be rotated with the electric field oscillating right and left and the magnetic field oscillating down and up. This is a different solution that is traveling in the same direction. This arbitrariness in the orientation with respect to propagation direction is known as polarization. On a quantum level, it is described as photon polarization. The direction of the polarization is defined as the direction of the electric field.

More general forms of the second-order wave equations given above are available, allowing for both non-vacuum propagation media and sources. Many competing derivations exist, all with varying levels of approximation and intended applications. One very general example is a form of the electric field equation, which was factorized into a pair of explicitly directional wave equations, and then efficiently reduced into a single uni-directional wave equation by means of a simple slow-evolution approximation.

== See also ==
- Antenna measurement
- Bioelectromagnetics
- Bolometer
- CONELRAD
- Electromagnetic pulse
- Electromagnetic radiation and health
- Evanescent wave coupling
- Finite-difference time-domain method
- Gravitational wave
- Helicon
- Impedance of free space
- Panofsky–Phillips equations
- Radiation reaction
- Health effects of sunlight exposure
- Sinusoidal plane-wave solutions of the electromagnetic wave equation
