= GTRI Sensors and Electromagnetic Applications Laboratory =

Sensors and Electromagnetic Applications Laboratory
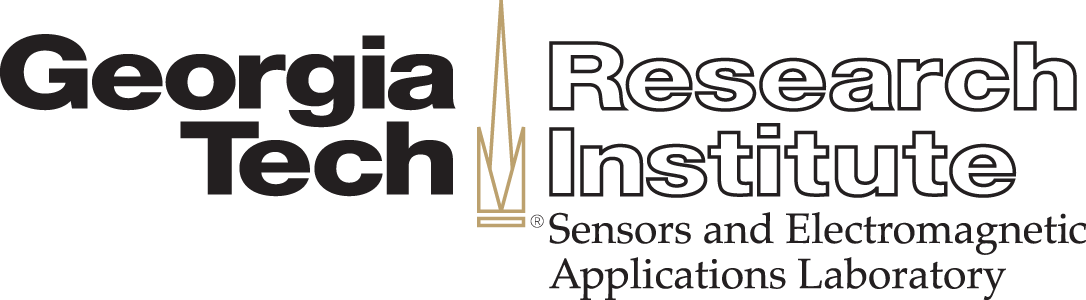
- Company type: Nonprofit
- Industry: radar systems, electromagnetic environmental effects, antenna technology
- Headquarters: Atlanta, Georgia, USA
- Key people: Mel Belcher; Laboratory Director
- Parent: Georgia Tech Research Institute
- Website: www.gtri.gatech.edu/seal

The Sensors and Electromagnetic Applications Laboratory (simply referred to as SEAL) is one of eight labs in the Georgia Tech Research Institute and one of three labs under the Sensors and Intelligent Systems directorate. SEAL researchers investigate radar systems, electromagnetic environmental effects, radar system performance modeling and simulations, and antenna technology.

== Research areas ==
Radar programs focus on the development, analysis, and performance evaluation of radar systems; reflectivity and propagation measurement characterization; electronic attack and protection techniques; avionics integration; non-cooperative target identification; vulnerability analysis; signal processing techniques; ground and airborne moving target identification; synthetic aperture radar; and system sustainment tool development.

Antenna-related research programs characterize antenna gain characteristics, develop phased array antenna concepts, and develop various kinds of reflector-type and lens antennas. In the field of electromagnetic environmental effects, SEAL researchers analyze, measure, and control the electromagnetic interactions among elements of an electronic system and between the system and its environment. Additional research areas include sensor development for ballistic missile defense, physical security, meteorology, space-based surveillance and detection, transportation applications, engineering data analysis and modeling for sustainment of complex electronic systems, and customer-tailored short courses in electronic defense.
