= List of OMB Circulars and Bulletins =

This is a partial list of circulars and bulletins issued by the Office of Management and Budget (OMB) within the Executive Office of the President of the United States.

== Circulars ==
- Circular A-4: Requires federal agencies to identify why regulation is needed, consider a reasonable number of alternative regulatory approaches, and for each alternative conduct a rigorous and objective benefit-cost analysis
- Circular A-11: Preparation, submission, and execution of the budget, revised and reissued periodically
- Circular A-16: Creation, maintenance and use of spatial data
- Circular A-21: Costs in support of sponsored research, development and training
- Circular A-119 relates to federal participation in the development and use of voluntary consensus standards and in conformity assessment activities. It was originally published on 20 October 1993, and was updated on 10 February 1998
- Circular A-123: Management responsibilities for internal controls in federal agencies
- Circular A-126: Improving the management and use of government aircraft
- Circular A-130: Managing information as a strategic resource
- Circular A-131: Value Engineering, issued 26 January 1988, revised 21 May 1993 and 26 December 2013. Contains guidance to support the sustained use of value engineering by federal departments and agencies
- Circular A-133: Audits of states, local government and non-profit organizations: see OMB A-133 Compliance Supplement

== OMB Bulletins with multi-year effect ==
Most OMB Bulletins are intended to have relevance in only a single fiscal year. A few have longer lifetimes, including:

- OMB Bulletin M20-01, Revised Delineations of Metropolitan Statistical Areas, Micropolitan Statistical Areas, and Combined Statistical Areas, and Guidance on Uses of Delineations of These Areas
- OMB Bulletin No. 17-03, Audit Requirements for Federal Financial Statements
- OMB Bulletin M07-02, Bulletin for Agency Good Guidance Practices, 72 Fed. Reg. 43432 (Jan. 25, 2007)
- OMB Bulletin M05-03, Information Quality Bulletin for Peer Review
- OMB Bulletin B01-09, Form and Content of Agency Financial Statements
