= United States Senate Committee on Homeland Security and Governmental Affairs =

Standing committee of the United States Senate

Senate Homeland Security and Governmental Affairs Committee
Standing committee
- Active United States Senate; 119th Congress

History
- Formed: October 9, 2004
- Succeeded: Committee on the District of Columbia (1816); Committee on Post Office and Civil Service (1816); Committee on Retrenchment (1842); Committee on Expenditures in the Executive Departments (1921); Committee on Government Operations (1952); Committee on Governmental Affairs (1978)

Leadership
- Chair: Rand Paul (R); Since January 3, 2025
- Ranking Member: Gary Peters (D); Since January 3, 2025

Structure
- Seats: 15 members
- Political parties: Majority (8): Republican (8); Minority (7): Democratic (7)

Jurisdiction
- Policy areas: Accounting standards, Census, Compliance audit, Federal civil service, Federal Protective Service, Federal statistics, Financial audit, Freedom of information, Government of the District of Columbia, Governmental accounting, Homeland security, Mail, National archives, Nuclear export policy, Organization and reorganization of the executive branch of government, Performance audit, Public procurement, Records management, United States budget process
- Oversight authority: Cybersecurity and Infrastructure Security Agency, Department of Homeland Security, Domestic Nuclear Detection Office, Government Accountability Office, Federal Emergency Management Agency, General Services Administration, National Archives and Records Administration, Office of E-Government & Information Technology, Office of Federal Financial Management, Office of Federal Procurement Policy, Office of Information and Regulatory Affairs, Postal Regulatory Commission, United States Capitol Police, United States Census Bureau, United States Office of Management and Budget, United States Office of Personnel Management, United States Postal Service, United States Secret Service, Washington, D.C., White House Office of Intergovernmental Affairs
- House counterpart: House Committee on Homeland Security, House Committee on Oversight and Reform

Meeting place
- 340 Dirksen Senate Office Building; Washington, D.C.

Website
- www.hsgac.senate.gov

Rules
- Rules of the Committee on Homeland Security and Governmental Affairs

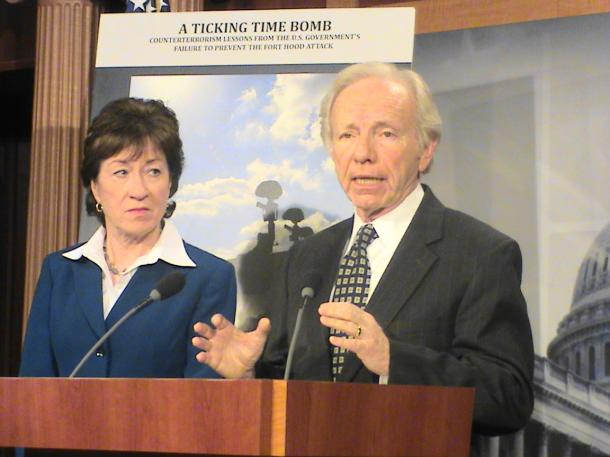
In 2011, Chair Joe Lieberman and Ranking Member Susan Collins address bipartisan suggestion on countermeasures toward domestic terrorism and Jihadist extremism in the United States.

The United States Senate Committee on Homeland Security and Governmental Affairs is the chief oversight committee of the United States Senate. It has jurisdiction over matters related to the Department of Homeland Security and other homeland security concerns, as well as the functioning of the government itself, including the National Archives, budget and accounting measures other than appropriations, the census, the federal civil service, the affairs of the District of Columbia and the United States Postal Service. It was called the United States Senate Committee on Governmental Affairs before homeland security was added to its responsibilities in 2004. It serves as the Senate's chief investigative and oversight committee. Its chair is the only Senate committee chair who can issue subpoenas without a committee vote.

== History ==
While elements of the committee can be traced back into the 19th century, its modern origins began with the creation of the Committee on Expenditures in the Executive Departments on April 18, 1921. The Committee on Expenditures in the Executive Department was renamed the Committee on Government Operations in 1952, which was reorganized as the Committee on Governmental Affairs in 1978. After passage of the Intelligence Reform and Terrorism Prevention Act of 2004, the committee became the Committee on Homeland Security and Governmental Affairs and added homeland security to its jurisdiction.

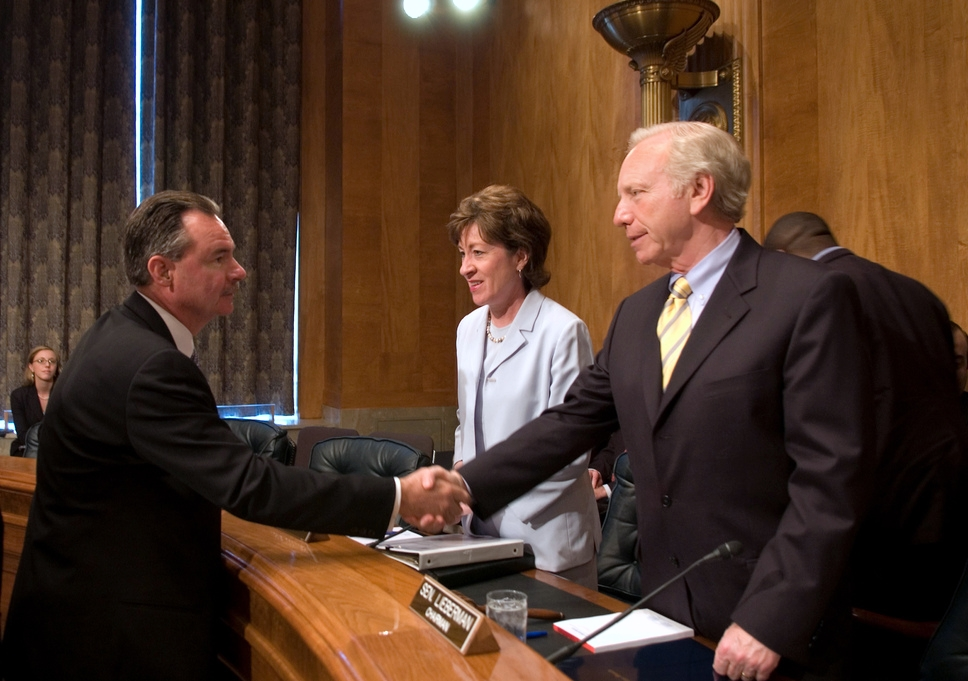
Committee Chair Joe Lieberman and Ranking Member Susan Collins talk with FEMA Administrator R. David Paulison.

Of the five current subcommittees, the Permanent Subcommittee on Investigations is the oldest and most storied, having been created at the same time as the Committee on Government Operations in 1952. The Subcommittee on the Oversight of Government Management, the Federal Workforce, and the District of Columbia was established after the creation of the Committee on Governmental Affairs in 1978. The Subcommittee on Federal Financial Management, Government Information, Federal Services and International Security was created in 2003.

Two ad hoc subcommittees were established in January 2007 to reflect the committee's expanded homeland security jurisdiction. They were the Subcommittee on Disaster Recovery and the Subcommittee on State, Local, and Private Sector Preparedness and Integration. The Subcommittee on Contracting was added in 2009. In 2011, the Disaster and State, Local, and Private Sector subcommittees were merged to form the Subcommittee on Disaster Recovery and Intergovernmental Affairs.

Over the years, the Committee on Homeland Security and Governmental Affairs and its predecessors have dealt with a number of important issues, including government accountability, congressional ethics, regulatory affairs, and systems and information security. In 2003, after the Homeland Security Act of 2002 established the Department of Homeland Security, the committee adopted primary oversight of the creation and subsequent policies, operations, and actions of the department.

In the past decade, the committee has focused particularly on the Department of Homeland Security's ability to respond to a major catastrophe, such as Hurricane Katrina; the rise of homegrown terrorism in the United States; and the vulnerabilities of the nation's most critical networks, those operating systems upon which our national defense, economy, and way of life depend, such as the power grid, water treatment facilities, transportation and financial networks, nuclear reactors, and dams.

In February 2014, staff working for committee ranking member Senator Tom Coburn issued a report raising concerns that some passwords protecting highly sensitive government data "wouldn't pass muster for even the most basic civilian email account."

== Jurisdiction ==
In accordance of Rule XXV(k) of the United States Senate, all proposed legislation, messages, petitions, memorials, and other matters relating primarily to the following subjects is referred to the Senate Homeland Security and Governmental Affairs Committee:

1. Archives of the United States;
2. Budget and accounting measures, other than appropriations, except was provided in the Congressional Budget Act of 1974;
3. Census and collection of statistics, including economic and social statistics;
4. Congressional organization, except for any part of the matter that amends the rules or orders of the Senate;
5. Department of Homeland Security, as provided in S.Res.445.
6. Federal Civil Service;
7. Government information;
8. Intergovernmental relations;
9. Municipal affairs of the District of Columbia, except appropriations therefor;
10. Organization and management of United States nuclear export policy;
11. Organization and reorganization of the executive branch of Government;
12. Postal Service; and
13. Status of officers and employees of the United States, including their classification, compensation, and benefits.

The committee also has the duty of:

1. receiving and examining reports of the Comptroller General of the United States and of submitting such recommendations to the Senate as it deems necessary or desirable in connection with the subject matter of such reports;
2. studying the efficiency, economy, and effectiveness of all agencies and departments of the Government;
3. evaluating the effects of laws enacted to reorganize the legislative and executive branches of the Government; and
4. studying the intergovernmental relationships between the United States and the States and municipalities, and between the United States and international organizations of which the United States is a member.

== Members, 119th Congress ==
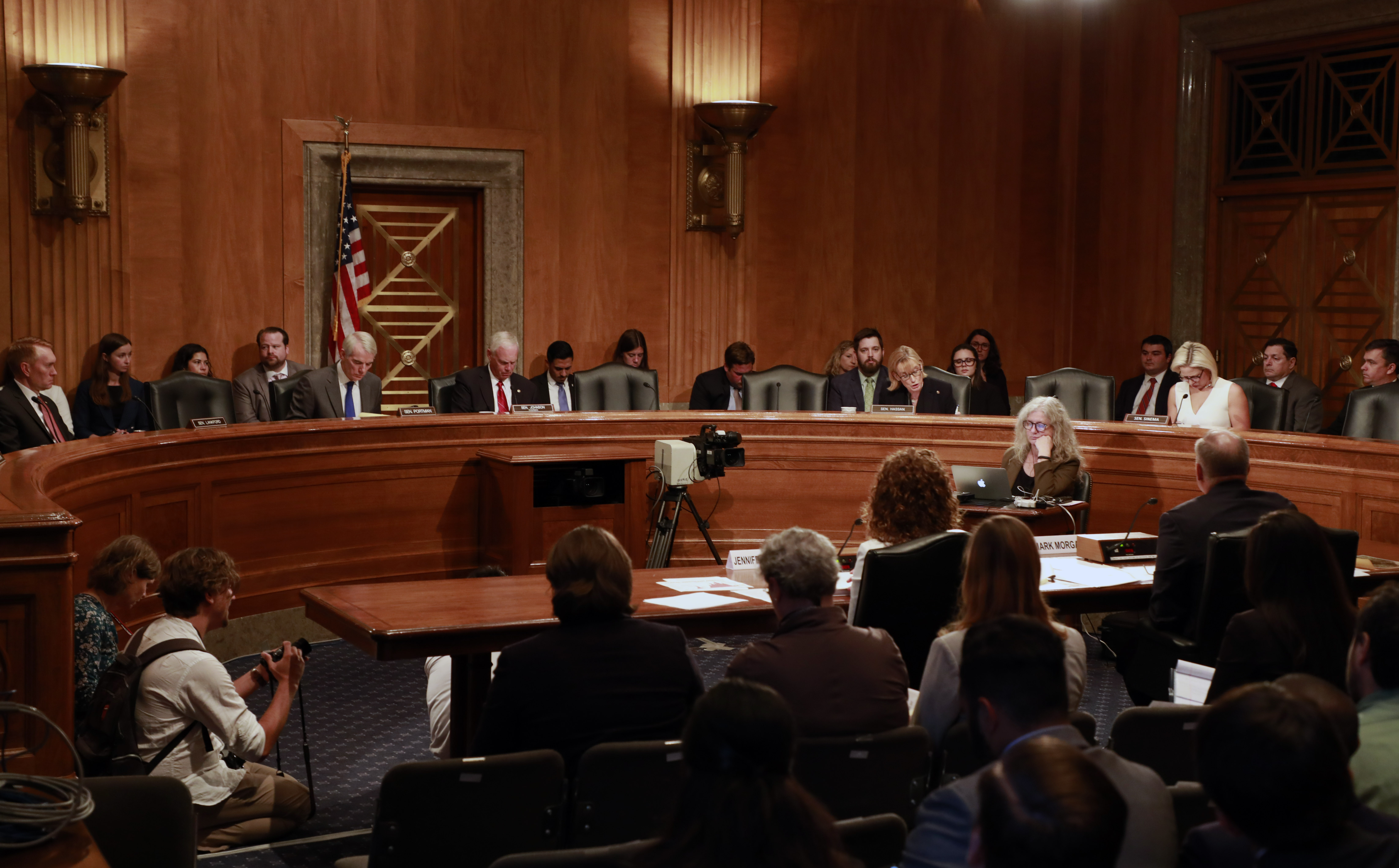
The committee hears testimony on border security in 2019.

Majority	Minority
Rand Paul, Kentucky, Chair; Ron Johnson, Wisconsin; James Lankford, Oklahoma; Rick Scott, Florida; Josh Hawley, Missouri; Bernie Moreno, Ohio; Joni Ernst, Iowa; Ashley Moody, Florida (from January 24, 2025)	Gary Peters, Michigan, Ranking Member; Maggie Hassan, New Hampshire; Richard Blumenthal, Connecticut; John Fetterman, Pennsylvania; Andy Kim, New Jersey; Ruben Gallego, Arizona; Elissa Slotkin, Michigan

=== Subcommittees ===
Subcommittee	Chair	Ranking Member
Investigations (Permanent)	Ron Johnson (R-WI)	Richard Blumenthal (D-CT)
Border Management, Federal Workforce, and Regulatory Affairs	James Lankford (R-OK)	John Fetterman (D-PA)
Disaster Management, District of Columbia, and Census	Josh Hawley (R-MO)	Andy Kim (D-NJ)

== Chair ==
=== Committee on Expenditures in Executive Departments, 1921–1952 ===
Name	Party	State	Start	End
Medill McCormick	Republican	IL	1921	1925
David Reed	Republican	PA	1925	1927
Frederic Sackett	Republican	KY	1927	1930
Guy Goff	Republican	WV	1930	1931
Frederick Steiwer	Republican	OR	1931	1933
Hamilton Lewis	Democratic	IL	1933	1939
Frederick Van Nuys	Democratic	IN	1939	1942
Lister Hill	Democratic	AL	1942	1947
George Aiken	Republican	VT	1947	1949
John McClellan	Democratic	AR	1949	1952

=== Committee on Government Operations, 1952–1977 ===
Name	Party	State	Start	End
John McClellan	Democratic	AR	1952	1953
Joseph McCarthy	Republican	WI	1953	1955
John McClellan	Democratic	AR	1955	1972
Sam Ervin	Democratic	NC	1972	1974
Abe Ribicoff	Democratic	CT	1974	1977

=== Committee on Governmental Affairs, 1977–2005 ===
Name	Party	State	Start	End
Abe Ribicoff	Democratic	CT	1977	1981
Bill Roth	Republican	DE	1981	1987
John Glenn	Democratic	OH	1987	1995
Bill Roth	Republican	DE	1995	
Ted Stevens	Republican	AK	1995	1997
Fred Thompson	Republican	TN	1997	2001
Joe Lieberman	Democratic	CT	2001	
Fred Thompson	Republican	TN	2001	
Joe Lieberman	Democratic	CT	2001	2003
Susan Collins	Republican	ME	2003	2005

=== Committee on Homeland Security and Governmental Affairs, 2005–present ===
Name	Party	State	Start	End
Susan Collins	Republican	ME	2005	2007
Joe Lieberman	Independent Democrat	CT	2007	2013
Tom Carper	Democratic	DE	2013	2015
Ron Johnson	Republican	WI	2015	2021
Gary Peters	Democratic	MI	2021	2025
Rand Paul	Republican	KY	2025	present

== Ranking members ==
Name	Party	State	Start	End
Jim Davis	Republican	PA	???	1945
George Aiken	Republican	VT	1945	1947
John McClellan	Democratic	AR	1947	1949
Joe McCarthy	Republican	WI	1949	1953
John McClellan	Democratic	AR	1953	1955
Joe McCarthy	Republican	WI	1955	1959
Karl Mundt	Republican	SD	1963	1972
Chuck Percy	Republican	IL	1972	1981
Thomas Eagleton	Democratic	MO	1981	1987
William Roth	Republican	DE	1987	1995
John Glenn	Democratic	OH	1995	1999
Joe Lieberman	Democratic	CT	1999	2001
Fred Thompson	Republican	TN	2001	2003
Joe Lieberman	Democratic	CT	2003	2007
Susan Collins	Republican	ME	2007	2013
Tom Coburn	Republican	OK	2013	2015
Tom Carper	Democratic	DE	2015	2017
Claire McCaskill	Democratic	MO	2017	2019
Gary Peters	Democratic	MI	2019	2021
Rob Portman	Republican	OH	2021	2023
Rand Paul	Republican	KY	2023	2025
Gary Peters	Democratic	MI	2025	present

== Historical committee rosters ==
=== 118th Congress ===
Majority	Minority
Gary Peters, Michigan, Chair; Tom Carper, Delaware; Maggie Hassan, New Hampshire; Kyrsten Sinema, Arizona (Note: Kyrsten Sinema was formally an independent but caucused with the Democrats.); Jacky Rosen, Nevada; Alex Padilla, California (until October 17, 2023); Jon Ossoff, Georgia; Richard Blumenthal, Connecticut; Laphonza Butler, California (October 17, 2023–December 8, 2024); Adam Schiff, California (from December 10, 2024)	Rand Paul, Kentucky, Ranking Member; Ron Johnson, Wisconsin; James Lankford, Oklahoma; Mitt Romney, Utah; Rick Scott, Florida; Josh Hawley, Missouri; Roger Marshall, Kansas

Subcommittees

Subcommittee	Chair	Ranking Member
Emerging Threats and Spending Oversight	Maggie Hassan (D-NH)	Mitt Romney (R-UT)
Government Operations and Border Management	Kyrsten Sinema (I-AZ)	James Lankford (R-OK)
Investigations (Permanent)	Richard Blumenthal (D-CT)	Ron Johnson (R-WI)

=== 117th Congress ===
Majority	Minority
Gary Peters, Michigan, Chair; Tom Carper, Delaware; Maggie Hassan, New Hampshire; Kyrsten Sinema, Arizona; Jacky Rosen, Nevada; Alex Padilla, California; Jon Ossoff, Georgia	Rob Portman, Ohio, Ranking Member; Ron Johnson, Wisconsin; Rand Paul, Kentucky; James Lankford, Oklahoma; Mitt Romney, Utah; Rick Scott, Florida; Josh Hawley, Missouri

Subcommittees

Subcommittee	Chair	Ranking Member
Emerging Threats and Spending Oversight	Maggie Hassan (D-NH)	Rand Paul (R-KY)
Government Operations and Border Management	Kyrsten Sinema (I-AZ)	James Lankford (R-OK)
Investigations (Permanent)	Jon Ossoff (D-GA)	Ron Johnson (R-WI)

=== 116th Congress ===
Majority	Minority
Ron Johnson, Wisconsin, Chair; Rob Portman, Ohio; Rand Paul, Kentucky; James Lankford, Oklahoma; Mike Enzi, Wyoming; Mitt Romney, Utah; Rick Scott, Florida; Josh Hawley, Missouri	Gary Peters, Michigan, Ranking Member; Tom Carper, Delaware; Maggie Hassan, New Hampshire; Kamala Harris, California; Kyrsten Sinema, Arizona; Jacky Rosen, Nevada

Subcommittees

Subcommittee	Chair	Ranking Member
Federal Spending Oversight and Emergency Management	Rand Paul (R-KY)	Maggie Hassan (D-NH)
Investigations (Permanent)	Rob Portman (R-OH)	Tom Carper (D-DE)
Government Operations and Border Management	James Lankford (R-OK)	Kyrsten Sinema (D-AZ)

== See also ==
- List of United States Senate committees
