= Federal Audit Clearinghouse =

US federal government office

Department overview
- Jurisdiction: Federal government of the United States
- Headquarters: 1201 E. 10th Street, Jeffersonville, Indiana 47132, United States; 38.288469°N 85.736133°W
- Parent department: U.S. Census Bureau
- Website: harvester.census.gov/facweb

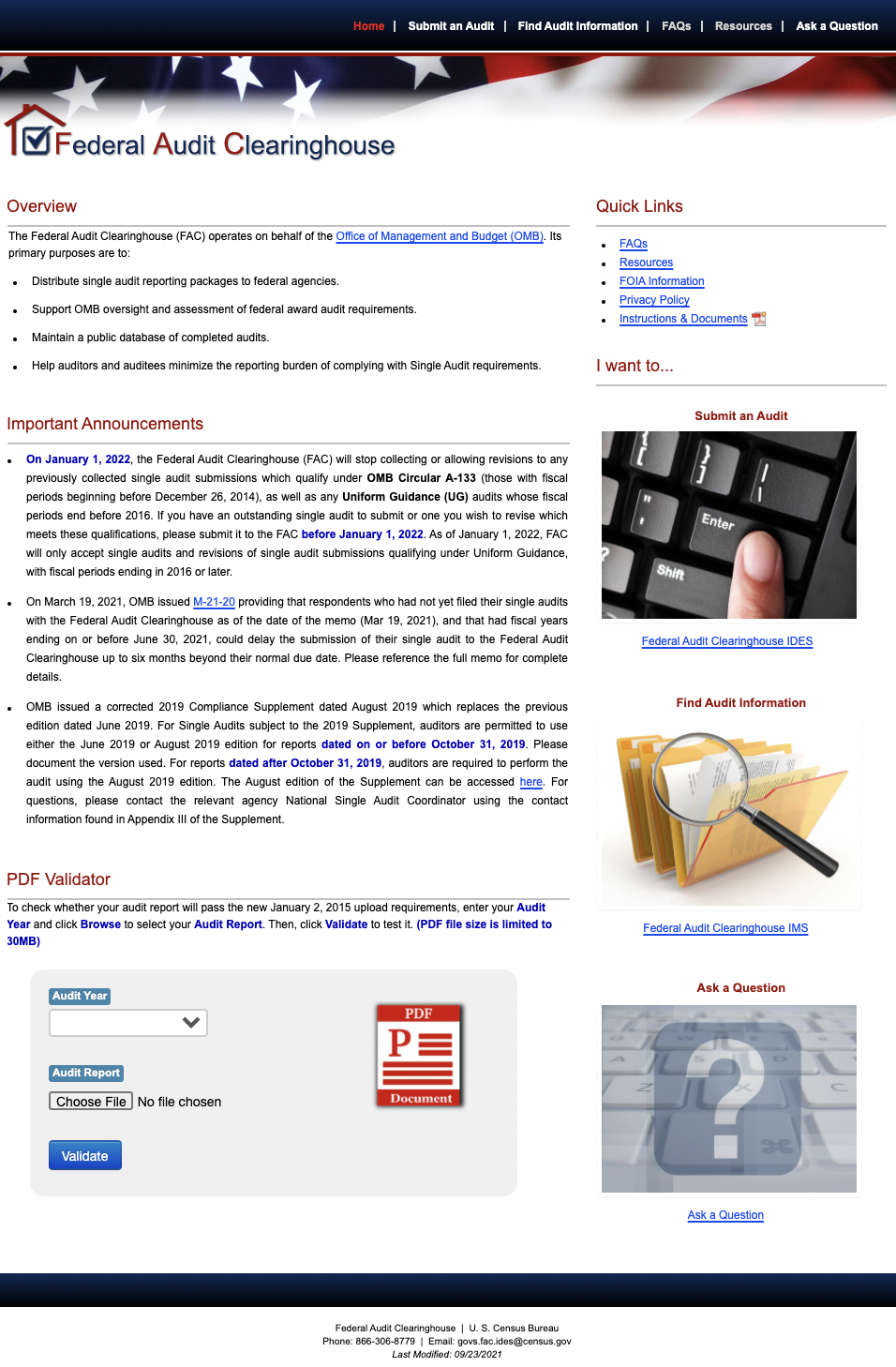
Screen grab image of website home page of the US Federal Audit Clearinghouse

The Federal Audit Clearinghouse (FAC) is an office within the United States federal government. In compliance with the U.S. Office of Management and Budget (OMB) Circular A-133 Revised, the FAC is in charge of receiving, processing and distributing to U.S. federal agencies the Single Audit reporting packages of thousands of recipients of federal assistance. OMB designated the U.S. Census Bureau to serve as the Federal Audit Clearinghouse. It operates and maintains an online database of Single Audit information submitted by recipients going back to 1997.

== Background ==
Each year the federal government provides over $500 billion in federal assistance to all kinds of recipients, including states, cities and counties, non-profit organizations, universities and individuals. In order to monitor the fair, legal, and correct use of these funds, the government created the Single Audit. This annual audit applies to any state and local government, non-profit entity, or Indian tribe that expended $750,000 or more of Federal assistance within one fiscal year. The Single Audit incorporates the auditing of the use and management of the federal funds to verify if it complied with the laws and regulations applicable to that specific assistance.

When the Single Audit is complete, the recipient must send the auditor's reports and other required documentation to the Federal Audit Clearinghouse (FAC). The FAC then enters the results of the audit into its electronic database and stores the data. The information included in the database is limited to the recipient's basic information (including contact information, addresses, etc.), the auditor's basic information, the types of federal assistance received and audited (also known as federal programs), and the type of auditor's findings, if any, detected in the Single Audit (e.g., situations of noncompliance, illegal acts, etc.). The online database can be accessed by federal agencies and the general public to learn about a specific recipient's Single Audit results, although it is limited to the information previously mentioned. Additionally, federal agencies may request to see a recipient's Single Audit reporting package to obtain more specific and detailed information about the audit results and about any findings encountered.

The Federal Audit Clearinghouse has four basic operating objectives:

- Distribute single audit information to federal agencies and the American public.
- Support the OMB in oversight, monitoring, and assessment of U.S. federal assistance.
- Assist federal agencies in obtaining Single Audit data and reporting packages from its recipients.
- Help auditors and recipients minimize the reporting burden of complying with Single Audit requirements (e.g., recipients and auditors are not required to send a copy of the reporting packages to every single federal government agency).

== Data Collection Form ==
The Data Collection Form (Form SF-SAC) is a worksheet which recipients must complete online and include with the Single Audit reporting packages sent to the FAC. The worksheet is divided into three parts, and is an important tool for the FAC because it summarizes the entire Single Audit results of a recipient in a few pages, which allows for easier and faster sorting and categorizing. The Data Collection Form is created online and a physical copy is sent with the Single Audit reporting package to the FAC, certified by both the recipient and the auditor. Beginning with the submission of 2008 audit submissions, the entire audit package must be submitted electronically.

The first part of the data collection form requires the recipient and its auditor to provide basic contact information, including the person occupying the highest management position of the recipient (e.g., governor, mayor, chancellor, president, CEO) and the auditor (usually a partner), addresses, telephone numbers, Employer Identification Number (EIN), among other info.

The second part includes information about the Single Audit itself. The auditor must indicate the final results of the audit, provide information on several risk assessments performed on the recipient during the Single Audit, specify which federal assistance programs were actually audited, and indicate whether any findings were noted during the Single Audit, among other information.

The third and final part requires the recipient to list all the federal assistance received by program name, and include basic information about each program including the amount of assistance used, the type of assistance, whether or not any findings were encountered for each program, and, if encountered, the type of compliance requirement that the finding applies to.

== See also ==
- U.S. Office of Management and Budget
- Single Audit
- OMB A-133 Compliance Supplement
- Compliance requirements
