= List of circulars =

Following is a list of circulars, written statements distributed to a wide audience.

== Government publications ==
- A circular distributed as a written statement of government policy will often provide information, guidance, rules, and/or background information on legislative or procedural matters. These include:
  - Chamberlain Circular, a circular issued in 1886 in the United Kingdom encouraging the setting up of work relief projects in times of high unemployment
  - Circular 10/65, a document issued in 1965 by the Department of Education and Science (DES) requesting Local Education Authorities in England and Wales to begin converting their secondary schools to the Comprehensive System
  - Circular 230, a document that sets forth the rules to practice before the United States Treasury Department
  - Court Circular, the official record that lists the engagements carried out by the Monarch of the United Kingdom
  - Massachusetts Circular Letter, a 1768 statement written by Samuel Adams and passed by the Massachusetts House of Representatives
  - OMB Circular A-123, a U.S. Office of Management and Budget circular that defines the management responsibilities for internal financial controls in Federal agencies
  - OMB Circular A-126, a Government circular that introduces standards and policies regarding the management and use of United States Government aircraft
  - OMB Circular A-130, a circular produced by the United States Federal Government to establish policy for executive branch departments and agencies
  - OMB Circular A-16, a circular created by the United States Office of Management and Budget to provide guidance for federal agencies that create, maintain or use spatial data directly or indirectly through the establishment of the NSDI and FGDC
  - OMB Circular A-21, a Government circular that sets forth the rules governing the eligibility and calculation of costs in support of sponsored research, development, training and other works produced in agreement with the United States Federal Government
  - Specie Circular, an executive order issued by U.S. President Andrew Jackson in 1836
  - Valuev Circular, a secret 1863 decree of the Minister of Internal Affairs of the Russian Empire

== Other publications ==
- Amasya Circular, considered as the first written document putting the Turkish War of Independence in motion
- IAU Circular, notices that give information about astronomical phenomena
- Minor Planet Circular, circular letter that is generally published on the date of each full moon by the Minor Planet Center
- Minor Planet Electronic Circular, publications by the Minor Planet Center that contain positional observations and orbits of unusual minor planets and all comets
- Numismatic Circular, an international periodical that has been published since 1892
- Pollen Analysis Circular, a botany paper that was published from 1943 to 1952
- Pollen and Spore Circular, a botany paper that was published from 1952 to 1954
- Post Office circular, a British postal system government circular that gives information of new postage stamps
- Uniform Franchise Offering Circular, a legal document that was used in the franchising process in the United States
