= Georgia Tech Research Corporation =

- Type: Nonprofit
- Founded: 1937 recreated in 1946
- Founder: Harry L. Baker Jr. (1946)
- Headquarters: Atlanta, Georgia, USA
- Parent: Georgia Institute of Technology
- Divisions: Georgia Tech Applied Research Corporation (GTARC)
- Website: www.gtrc.gatech.edu

The Georgia Tech Research Corporation (GTRC) is a contracting organization that supports research and technological development at the Georgia Institute of Technology.

== History ==
- Name: Years
Industrial Development Council	1937–1946
Georgia Tech Research Institute	1946–1984
Georgia Tech Research Corporation	1984–present

The GTRC, then named the Industrial Development Council, was founded in 1937 to serve as a contracting agency for the State Engineering Experiment Station (EES)—which then existed by that name on the Georgia Tech campus. In 1946 the Council was recreated and renamed the Georgia Tech Research Institute, still primarily serving the EES under the administration of director Harry L. Baker Jr.

By 1984 Georgia Tech had reorganized the duties and scopes of both the 'contracting agency' and the State EES in response to Tech's changes in priorities over time towards contracting in research and technological development with national industries and the federal government (especially Department of Defense agencies), and with foreign governments. At that time the 'contracting agency' was assigned its modern name, the Georgia Tech Research Corporation (GTRC); and the Engineering Experiment Station, now fully integrated into the academic and research structure of Georgia Tech, succeeded to its new name, the Georgia Tech Research Institute (GTRI).

In 2023, Georgia Tech and Georgia Tech Research Corporation agreed to pay a fine of $90,000 dollars to the Department of Justice as a result of violating the False Claims Act by not providing measures against its scientists to prevent false claims from being made to the National Science Foundation.

In 2025, Georgia Tech Research Corporation agreed to pay the United States $875,000 to resolve allegations that it violated the False Claims Act and federal common law by failing to meet cybersecurity requirements in connection with certain Air Force and Defense Advanced Research Projects Agency contracts. GTRC contracts with government agencies, including the U.S. Department of Defense, for research performed at its affiliate, the Georgia Institute of Technology.

== Structure ==
GTRC is a nonprofit corporation that works on behalf of all academic departments and divisions of Georgia Tech not related to the (1984-created) Georgia Tech Research Institute (GTRI)—which uses the dedicated services of the Georgia Tech Applied Research Corporation (GTARC). The GTRC serves as the contracting agency for sponsored research projects performed by Georgia Tech and it provides administrative and financial support to Georgia Tech. It is a 501(c)(3) corporation and utilizes the cost principles defined in OMB Circular A-21.

== Intellectual property ==
GTRC owns all intellectual property that arises from research and other scholarly activity conducted by Georgia Tech, including the Georgia Tech Research Institute. Its Office of Technology Licensing administers invention disclosures, patents, copyrights, and licenses for both GTRC and GTARC.
