= United States compliance requirements =

Series of directives established by the US federal government

In the United States, compliance requirements are a series of directives United States federal government agencies established that summarize hundreds of federal laws and regulations applicable to federal assistance (also known as federal aid or federal funds). They are currently incorporated into the OMB A-133 Compliance Supplement, which was created by the US Office of Management and Budget (OMB).

To facilitate a recipients' compliance with federal laws and regulations, and as well as its annual Single Audit, the OMB created fourteen basic and standard compliance requirements that recipients must comply with when receiving and using such federal assistance. The OMB also provides detailed explanations, discussions, and guidance about them in the OMB A-133 Compliance Supplement. Compliance requirements are only guidelines for compliance with the hundreds of laws and regulations applicable to the specific type assistance used by the recipient, and their objectives are generic in nature due to the large number of federal programs. Each compliance requirement is identified by a letter, in alphabetical order.

== Activities allowed or unallowed (A) ==
This compliance requirement establishes that each program operates for a specific purpose (such as the care of elderly persons or the education of children), and that funds provided for the program must only be used in activities that benefit that purpose. Therefore, federal assistance provided to a recipient for a specific purpose must be expended for such purpose only.

== Allowable costs/cost principles (B) ==
This compliance requirements is one of the most important sections, because it covers cost accounting policies, expenses and expenditures, and actual use of federal funds to administer a federal assistance program. In other words, it provides the basis and principles recipients must adhere to when spending federal funds.

The federal government categorizes recipient types into three groups:

- State, local, and Indian tribal governments
- Institutions of higher education
- Non-profit organizations

Prior to December 26, 2014, each group has a separate set of cost principles to follow. The cost principles applicable to a recipient type apply to all federal assistance received by that entity, regardless of whether the awards are received directly from the federal government or indirectly through a pass-through entity.

The OMB issues a Cost Principle Circular for each category. This is a guide for spending federal assistance in accordance with laws and regulations:

- OMB Circular A 87, "Cost Principles for State, Local, and Indian Tribal Governments" (2 CFR part 225) – This circular includes the 50 States of the United States and the District of Columbia (Washington, D.C.), any agency or instrumentality of these governments—and any county, parish, municipality, city, town, State-designated Indian tribal government, school district, United States territories and possessions, and any agency or instrumentality of these governments.
- OMB Circular A-21, "Cost Principles for Educational Institutions" (2 CFR part 220) – All institutions of higher education (e.g., Colleges, Universities, etc.) are subject to the cost principles contained in this circular.
- OMB Circular A-122, "Cost Principles for Non-Profit Organizations" (2 CFR part 230) – Non-profit organizations are subject to this circular, except those non-profit organizations listed in OMB Circular A-122, Attachment C that are subject to the commercial cost principles contained in the Federal Acquisition Regulation (FAR).

The three circulars list various types of cost or expense item (such as travel expense, maintenance expense, payroll salaries, lobbying costs, purchase of materials, payment of utility bills, etc.), and establishes whether each is either allowable or unallowable. Allowable costs are those the federal government determines permissible for federal assistance. Unallowable costs are those the government prohibits incurring for federal assistance. Certain cost items are considered universally unallowable, such as cost related to illegal activities and lobbying costs, but others may be considered unallowable for a type of recipient while being allowable for another type of recipient. As a general rule, any assistance used inappropriately, such as incurring unallowable costs, requires reimbursement to the federal government.

The Uniform Administrative Requirements, Cost Principles and Audit Requirements for Federal Awards was issued by the Office of Management and Budget on December 26, 2013. This final guidance superseded and streamlined the requirements from OMB Circulars A-21, A-87, A-110, and A-122 (which have been placed in OMB guidance); Circulars A-89, A-102, and A-133; and the guidance in Circular A-50 on Single Audit Act follow-up.

In order for cost to be considered allowable, they must be supported by adequate documentation.

=== Documentation standards – payroll costs ===
Charges to federal awards for salaries and wages must be based on records that accurately reflect the work performed. These records must: (i) Be supported by a system of internal control which provides reasonable assurance that the charges are accurate, allowable, and properly allocated; [2 CFR § 200.430 (i)] Documenting time worked on federally funded activities is commonly referred to as Time and Effort Reporting.

=== Documentation standards – non-payroll costs ===
The nature of documentation required for nonpayroll costs will vary by the nature of the transaction.

Per 2 CFR §200.403, Except where otherwise authorized by statute, costs must meet the following general criteria in order to be allowable under federal awards:

- (a) Be necessary and reasonable for the performance of the federal award and be allocable thereto under these principles.
- (b) Conform to any limitations or exclusions set forth in these principles or in the federal award as to types or amount of cost items.
- (c) Be consistent with policies and procedures that apply uniformly to both federally financed and other activities of the non-federal entity.
- (d) Be accorded consistent treatment. A cost may not be assigned to a federal award as a direct cost if any other cost incurred for the same purpose in like circumstances has been allocated to the federal award as an indirect cost.
- (e) Be determined in accordance with generally accepted accounting principles (GAAP), except, for state and local governments and Indian tribes only, as otherwise provided for in this Part.
- (f) Not be included as a cost or used to meet cost sharing or matching requirements of any other federally financed program in either the current or a prior period.
- (g) Be adequately documented.

== Cash management (C) ==
This section covers the actual management, or handling, of funds pertaining to a federal program, specifically on how federal assistance is distributed to recipients and how recipients manage the funds until disbursement. The actual transfer of funds, commonly referred to as “drawdowns”, is usually done electronically by requesting the funds to the federal agency via website or a network. The funds are automatically transferred from the US Department of Treasury to the recipient's bank account. Federal assistance for program operations is provided to recipients usually by one of two methods, also called “funding techniques”: by either advances of funds or by reimbursement of funds.

- Advances of funds – Advances are federal funds provided to a recipient before the program activity is performed. Recipients determine the amount needed for a future expenditure (e.g., through budget process) and request the amount to the federal government (or in the case of subrecipients to the pass-through entity, see Subrecipient Monitoring below). The federal funds received are then expended to perform the specific activity (e.g., purchase good or service or for payroll). However, laws and regulations require recipients to request funds only when it is immediately needed, and recipients must try to minimize the amount of time between the receipts of funds to the actual disbursement. Examples of programs under these funding techniques are the Section 8 program and the Community Development Block Grant program.
- Reimbursement of funds – This funding technique requires the recipient to pay program expenditures with their own funds, and then request a reimbursement for those expenses from the federal government or pass-through entity. Recipients prepare and send reimbursement requests, and maintain supporting documentation showing that the costs for which reimbursement was requested were paid prior to the date of the reimbursement request.

== Davis–Bacon Act (D) ==
As part of the US Department of Labor’s (DOL) governmentwide implementation of the Davis–Bacon Act, federal regulations require that all laborers and mechanics who work for a contractor or subcontractor on federally financed construction contracts over $2,000 must be paid wages not less than those the DOL established for the project location (i.e., the prevailing wage). This Compliance Requirement was created to assure that recipients oblige contractors to comply with the Davis–Bacon Act, by including in their construction contracts with a contractor or subcontractor a clause or requirement to comply with the Davis–Bacon Act and the DOL regulations. The clause should also include a requirement for the contractor or subcontractor to submit to the recipient weekly (e.g., for each week in which any contract work is performed) a copy of the construction payroll accompanied by statement of compliance. This report is commonly referred to as "certified payrolls", and is often done using Optional Form WH-347 (OMB No. 1215-0149), a standard form pre-designed by the OMB.

== Eligibility (E) ==
The main objective of this compliance requirement is that only eligible individuals or organizations participate in federal assistance programs. While the criterion for determining eligibility may vary from program to program, the objective that only eligible individuals or organizations participate is consistent across all federal programs, which forms the basis of this compliance requirement. To comply with this objective, recipients must first assure that proper eligibility determinations are made, which means that the recipient must determine the parameters and limitations to define eligibility for a specific program in accordance with the program's purpose. Many federal programs already contain eligibility requirements based on laws, agency regulations, grant agreements, etc., and recipients must assure that their eligibility determination complies with such requirements. An example includes federal programs that offer HIV/Aids treatment and require that the participants be victims of such diseases. It is usually the recipient's responsibility to determine how to determine such eligibility, such as establishing policy that requires an in-house doctor or laboratory to diagnose each prospective participant, accepting diagnoses from third-party doctors or laboratories, etc. However, certain agencies have included specific parameters for which the recipient should follow, as in the case of the Department of Housing and Urban Development (HUD) which states in the Code of Federal Regulations (CFR) that recipients of certain HUD housing subsidy programs must obtain specific income verification documents to prove participant eligibility, such as W-2 payroll forms, a federal income tax return, etc.

After determining which eligibility requirements participation in a program requires, the recipient must also assure that individual program participant or group eligibility was correctly determined by keeping evidence of such compliance, such as maintaining documentation in participant files (e.g., copies of HIV/Aids diagnosis, copies of federal income tax returns, etc.). Furthermore, the recipient must assure that only eligible individuals or groups participated in the program by establishing strict controls of program funds to avoid non-eligible persons from receiving the specific assistance.

== Equipment and real property management (F) ==
This section established directives on how a recipient should manage equipment and real property of a federal program.

=== Equipment management ===
Equipment means tangible, non-expendable property acquired with federal assistance funds, that has a useful life of more than one year, and an acquisition cost of $5,000 or more per unit (though, consistent with a recipient's own equipment policy, lower cost limits may be established). Basically, this section requires that, as per A-102 Common Rule and OMB Circular A-110 regulations, equipment must be used in the federal program it was bought for, or—when appropriate—other federal programs. Additionally, the recipient must keep equipment records, perform a physical equipment inventory at least once every two years, and implement an appropriate internal control system to safeguard and maintain the equipment. When equipment with a current fair market value of $5,000 or more is no longer needed, it may be retained or sold, as a proportionate share is provided to the federal government amount of the current fair market value, based on the percent of federal funds to own recipients fund used to buy the item.

=== Real property management ===
Title to real property acquired by recipients with federal awards vests with the recipient. It must be used for the originally authorized purpose as long as needed for that purpose. Real property may be used in other federally sponsored projects or programs that have purposes similar to the one the property was bought for, as long as the federal government authorizes it. However it may not dispose of or encumber the title to real property without prior federal government consent. When it is no longer needed for the federally supported programs or projects, the recipient must request disposition instructions from the federal government. As with equipment, if the property is sold, a proportionate share is provided to the federal government, amount of the current fair market value, based on the percent of federal funds to own recipient's fund used to acquire the item.

== Matching, level of effort, earmarking (G) ==
This section covers 3 compliance requirements concerning recipient performance. They may require that recipients provide a level of contributions to a federal program, maintain specific levels of performance or achievement, or restrict the amount of federal funds used for a specific purpose. Failure to meet these requirements may result in either limitation of future funds or termination of assistance. Specific requirements for matching, level of effort, and earmarking are unique to each federal program, and are described in the laws, regulations, and contract or grant provisions that pertain to the program.

=== Matching ===
Matching, also referred to as “cost sharing”, is a requirement for the recipient to provide contributions or donations (usually non-federal) of a specified amount or percentage to supplement federal assistance received. In other words, when the recipient participates in a federal program (e.g. it receives federal assistance) and an operating budget is prepared, the federal government may require the recipient to provide contributions to cover a portion of that program's operations. The matching requirement is based on the assertion that total program expenses are 100% and that, although the federal government provides assistance for most of those expenses, the recipient must still cover a portion of them. Such proportion is solely decided by the federal government, but usually the recipient decides how that contribution is provided and to which expenses, so long as the contribution is verifiable, generally does not originate from another federal program, and is considered in the operating budget. The expenses must be necessary and reasonable, allowed under cost principles (see B section above), and not used for another federal program. Matching may be in the form of contributing the recipient's own funds or money to suffrage program allowable costs (e.g., paying program utility bills, paying part of program personnel payroll, etc.) or, in some cases, in the form of in-kind contributions, which are donations of non-monetary objects such as services, materials, property, etc.

Examples of matching include the Head Start program, which requires that recipients provide 20% of the total annual expenses in either monetary or in-kind contributions. Recipients of these funds may contribute money to cover teacher payroll, or may contribute a building to house the program classrooms. However, the federal government requires that in-kind contributions be properly valued and evidenced (such as estimating the value of a building to make sure that it meets the 20% of the program budget), and certain programs specifically require that matching be made by contributing money only.

=== Level of effort ===
Level of effort defines particular goals or objectives the recipient must achieve with the assistance received, and includes recipient requirements for a specified level of service, specified level of expenditures for designated activities, and federal funds to supplement and not supplant non-federal services. Some examples are programs that establish that a recipient must provide medical services to 1,000 patients daily and programs that require that a recipients spend over 50% of its annual budget on capital projects, among other.

=== Earmarking ===
Earmarking is a requirement that specifies a limit amount or percentage of the program's assistance that must (minimum) or may (maximum) be used for specified activities. Examples of this include limits imposed on the federal government on the amount of federal funds to cover administrative expenses, or a percentage requirement for total program funds provided to subrecipients. Earmarking may also be specified in relation to the types of participants covered (e.g. a limit on how many participants a recipient can provide assistance to).

== Period of availability of federal funds (H) ==
This section establishes the fact that, although recipients may receive various federal awards during their lifespan, the individual federal grants are awarded for a specified time period, usually one year. Federal regulations prohibit the use of funds from a grant award outside its specified time frame unless authorized by a federal agency, and auditors should verify that the recipient expends its grant during that time only. For example, a surplus from a federal award that starts on January 1, 2006 and ends on December 31, 2006 cannot be used after December 31, because its lifespan has terminated. This surplus must be returned to the federal agency unless otherwise authorized.

== Procurement and suspension and debarment (I) ==
This section covers compliance of laws and regulations when obtaining a good or services from a vendor, supplier, or provider. The procurement requirement is established to ensure that such goods and services are obtained in an effective manner and in compliance with laws and regulations, including the prohibition of conflicts of interest, the fair selection of vendors, provide open and free competition among vendors, etc. The suspension and debarment requirement establishes that certain non-federal entities have been prohibited from participating in or receiving federal assistance for various reasons, including prior mismanagement of funds or previous non-compliance of laws and regulations. This prohibition may be temporary (suspension) or indefinite (debarment; until specifically allowed by the government). When performing this purchase, the recipient must verify that the vendor, supplier, provider or their respective principals (e.g., owners, top management, etc.) are not suspended, debarred or otherwise excluded by the federal government. This is done by checking the Excluded Parties List System (EPLS) maintained by the General Services Administration or by contacting the federal agency.

== Program income (J) ==
Program income is sometimes directly generated by the federally funded program. This type of income includes, but is not limited to, income from fees for services performed, the use or rental of property acquired with program funds, the sale of items fabricated under the program, and payments of principal and interest on loans made by the recipient to others with program funds. However, it generally does not include interest on program funds (which is covered under “Cash Management”, see above); nor does it cover rebates, credits, discounts, and refunds (covered under “Allowable Costs/Cost Principles”); nor proceeds from the sale of equipment or real property (covered under “Equipment and Real Property Management”). The uses or treatment of program income are either deducted by the federal agency from the current program budget (e.g., the program income substitutes part of the original budget), added to the current program budget, or used to meet matching requirements.

== Real property acquisition and relocation assistance (K) ==
This section covers compliance with the Uniform Relocation Assistance and Real Property Acquisition Policies Act of 1970 (URA). This act provides for uniform and equitable treatment of persons displaced by a federal programs from their homes, businesses, or farms, including assuring just compensation and assisting in relocation. For example, if the construction of a highway under a federal program requires the expropriation of homes, the expropriation must be made by either providing fair compensation for that property or providing assistance for, or reimbursement of, relocation expenses incurred by the affected person. The Compliance Supplement suggests verifying that the property acquired is appraised by qualified independent appraisers, the appraisals are examined by a review appraiser to assure acceptability, and that after acceptance, the review appraiser certifies the recommended or approved value of the property for just compensation to the owner.

== Reporting (L) ==
This section establishes that all recipients must submit reports (whether financial, performance-related, or of special nature) to the federal government to monitor federal assistance activities and uses. The most common reports are pre-designed by the federal agency, are approved by OMB, and are freely available to all recipients and the general public. The time deadlines for submitting them vary depending on the report. Furthermore, the reporting requirements (e.g., which reports must be submitted, the timing of the submission, information in the reports, etc.) may vary from recipient to recipient, although the federal government has established several reports that apply to all recipients. Some of the most common of these “universal” reports include:

- SF-269 (OMB approval no. 0348-0039) or SF-269A (OMB no. 0348-0038), commonly known as the Financial Status Report (FSR) – Used to report the status of funds (e.g., amount received, amount expended or used, amount reserved, amount unused, etc.)
- SF-270 (OMB no. 0348-0004), also known as the Request for Advance or Reimbursement – Used to request U.S. Treasury advance payments and reimbursements under non-construction programs.
- SF-272 (OMB no. 0348-0003) or SF-272-A (OMB No. 0348-0003), commonly known as the Federal Cash Transactions Report or Status of Federal Cash Report – Provides accountability of all federal cash received by the recipient. It is partially prepared by the Division of Payment Management (DPM) within the Department of Health and Human Services based on data reported to the DPM by recipients and federal agencies, and is completed and certified by the recipient.

== Subrecipient monitoring (M) ==
This compliance requirement establishes that any non-federal recipient of federal assistance that passes that assistance, whether in part or in total, to another recipient (known as pass-through entities and subrecipients, respectively) is responsible to monitor the federal assistance activities of that subrecipient, as well as assure that they are both complying with laws and regulations. This requirement is based on the fact that they are both equally responsible for federal funds received. Subrecipient monitoring may consist of site visits, regular contact, interviews, meetings and examinations of the subrecipient, as well as requiring that the subrecipient be subject to an annual single audit.

== Special tests and provisions (N) ==
Certain programs have unique compliance requirements—established by laws, regulations, and contract or grant agreements—that do not fit into the requirements listed above. This sections covers those requirements. The auditor must review the program's contract and grant agreements and referenced laws and regulations to identify unique compliance requirements, and develop audit objectives and audit procedures under this section.

== See also ==
- OMB A-133 Compliance Supplement
- Single Audit
- Code of Federal Regulations
- Federal assistance in the United States
- NIST SP 800-115 and Penetration Testing
