= Title II =

Title II may refer to:

- Patriot Act, Title II
- Title II of the Communications Act of 1934
- Title II of the Civil Rights Act of 1964
- Title II of the Elementary and Secondary Education Act
- Title II of the Americans with Disabilities Act
- Title II weapons
- Title 2 of the United States Code
- Title 2 of the Code of Federal Regulations
