= OMB A-133 Compliance Supplement =

US federal government guide

The OMB A-133 Compliance Supplement is a large and extensive United States federal government guide created by the Office of Management and Budget (OMB) and used in auditing federal assistance and federal grant programs, as well as their respective recipients. It is considered to be the most important tool of an auditor for a Single Audit.

It was created following amendments in 1996 to the Single Audit Act based on numerous studies performed by the Government Accountability Office, the President's Council on Integrity and Efficiency and the National State Auditors Association (NSAA). It serves to identify important compliance requirements that the Federal Government expects to be considered as part of a Single Audit. Without it, auditors would need to research many laws and regulations for each program of a recipient to determine which compliance requirements are important to the Federal Government. For Single Audits, the Supplement replaces agency audit guides and other audit requirement documents for individual Federal programs.

== Divisions ==
The OMB A-133 Compliance Supplement is divided into 7 divisions:

- Part I: Background, Purpose, and Applicability – Presents a brief description of the history of the Single Audit, defines the purpose of the OMB Circular A-133, and establishes where and why the Single Audit applies.
- Part II: Matrix of Compliance Requirements – This section is a table which details the federal programs which are common within the US and specifies which compliance requirement applies to each program.
- Part III: Compliance Requirements – This section provides guidance and description on the 14 types of compliance guidelines established by federal agencies which summarize the compliance with federal laws and regulations in a general way. It also provides the auditor with certain audit objectives and suggested audit procedures to facilitate the audit. All federal programs, recipients, and auditors are required to follow these guidelines.
- Part IV: Agency Program Requirements – By far the largest section of the Supplement, this part is similar to Part III except that it provides detailed information program by program. Whereas Part III simply discusses the 14 compliance requirements, this section explains how each requirement applies to a particular program. It also provides a brief history of the program, discusses program objectives and operations, and offers the auditor much more specific suggested audit procedures.
- Part V: Clusters of Programs – This section is similar to Part IV, with the exception that it discusses clusters of programs, which are a grouping of closely related programs that have similar compliance requirements, such as Research and Development (R&D), Student Financial Aid (SFA), and other clusters. Although the programs within a cluster are administered as separate programs, a cluster of programs is treated as a single program for the purpose of meeting the audit requirements of OMB Circular A-133.
- Part VI: Internal Control – Federal guidelines require recipients to implement an internal control system to manage federal funds in keeping with compliance requirements. They also require auditors to obtain an understanding of the recipient's system as well as verify if it is operating correctly. This section helps recipients and auditors by describing, for each type of compliance requirement, the objectives and certain characteristics of internal control that, when present and operating effectively, may ensure compliance with program requirements. This is especially helpful for auditors because it outlines internal control characteristics that recipients may implement and auditors may verify and test to reasonably ensure compliance with the types of requirements in Part III.
- Part VII: Guidance for Auditing Programs Not Included in This Compliance Supplement – This section provides guidance to auditors regarding federal programs that were not covered in Part II, Part IV and Part V of the Supplement, including providing suggestions on how to research for laws and regulations applicable to that particular program and suggesting audit procedures to perform.

== Compliance requirements ==
Compliance requirements are series of directives established by US federal government agencies that guide recipients and auditors on how federal assistance should be managed. The OMB created 14 basic requirements which group all those compliance requirements and provided extensive array of information about them in the Compliance Supplement.

== See also ==
- Single Audit
- Compliance requirements
- Code of Federal Regulations
- Federal assistance in the United States
- Federal grant
