= Georgia Tech Applied Research Corporation =

- Formation: Tax-exempt since April 1999; 27 years ago
- Type: 501(c)(3)
- Tax ID no.: EIN: 582374837
- Headquarters: Atlanta
- Revenue: 903,257,158 USD (2024)
- Expenses: 907,100,849 USD (2024)
- Website: www.gtarc.gatech.edu

The Georgia Tech Applied Research Corporation (GTARC) is a wholly controlled nonprofit subsidiary of the Georgia Tech Research Corporation (GTRC) that was established to serve as the contracting agency for work performed by the Georgia Tech Research Institute. GTARC is a 501(c)(3) corporation. GTARC operates in accordance with the commercial cost principles defined in the Federal Acquisition Regulation, Subpart 31.2. The Office of Sponsored Programs at Georgia Tech negotiates and administers research grants and contracts for both GTRC and GTARC. The Office of Contract Administration and the Office of Industrial Contracting are divisions within the Office of Sponsored Programs.
