= Harry L. Baker Jr. =

American academic

- Baker, c. 1967
- Born: May 2, 1912
- Died: January 11, 1973 (age 60)
- Education: Georgia Institute of Technology; Emory University
- Scientific career
- Workplaces: Georgia Institute of Technology Georgia Tech Research Institute; United States Naval Reserve Georgia Tech Research Corporation

Harry L. Baker Jr. (May 2, 1912 – January 11, 1973) was the president of the Georgia Tech Research Corporation from its creation in 1946 until his death in 1973.

== Early life and education ==
Baker was born in Atlanta, Georgia and graduated from the Georgia Institute of Technology in 1934. He later received a Bachelor of Laws from Emory University in 1961.

== Career ==
Baker served in the United States Naval Reserves in the Pacific Ocean theatre of World War II, where he was in eleven operations. He received three commendations and the Bronze Star Medal, eventually attaining the rank of Commander in 1945, and retired from the naval reserves in 1972 as a captain.

From 1946 until his death in 1973, Baker served as the president of the Georgia Tech Research Corporation and director of research administration for the Georgia Institute of Technology.

== Memberships and awards ==
Baker was a member of Beta Theta Pi, the Georgia Society of Professional Engineers, and the National Association of College and Business Officers.

== Legacy ==
The Georgia Tech Research Institute's Baker Building is named after him.
