= United States Senate Homeland Security Subcommittee on Disaster Management, District of Columbia, and Census =

The Subcommittee on Disaster Management, District of Columbia, and Census is one of the three subcommittees within the Senate Committee on Homeland Security and Governmental Affairs. It was known in previous Congresses as the Subcommittee on Federal Spending Oversight and Emergency Management and the Subcommittee on Emerging Threats and Spending Oversight.

== Jurisdiction ==
- Preventing waste, fraud, and abuse related to federal spending;
- Identifying and examining emerging national and economic security threats;
- Examining federal preparedness to respond and address emerging threats including terrorism, disruptive technologies, misinformation and disinformation, climate change, and chemical, biological, radiological, nuclear, and explosive attacks;
- Improving coordination and addressing conflicts between federal departments and agencies, state, local, territorial, tribal governments, and private sector entities for emerging threat preparedness and prevention;
- Conducting oversight of the protection of civil rights and civil liberties by the Department of Homeland Security; and
- Modernizing federal information technology.

== Members, 119th Congress ==
Majority	Minority
Josh Hawley, Missouri, Chair; Rick Scott, Florida; Joni Ernst, Iowa; Ashley Moody, Florida	Andy Kim, New Jersey, Ranking Member; Richard Blumenthal, Connecticut; Elissa Slotkin, Michigan
Ex officio
Rand Paul, Kentucky	Gary Peters, Michigan

== Historical subcommittee rosters ==
=== 118th Congress ===
Majority	Minority
Maggie Hassan, New Hampshire, Chair; Kyrsten Sinema, Arizona; Jacky Rosen, Nevada; Jon Ossoff, Georgia	Mitt Romney, Utah, Ranking Member; Rick Scott, Florida; James Lankford, Oklahoma
Ex officio
Gary Peters, Michigan	Rand Paul, Kentucky
