= OMB Circular A-126 =

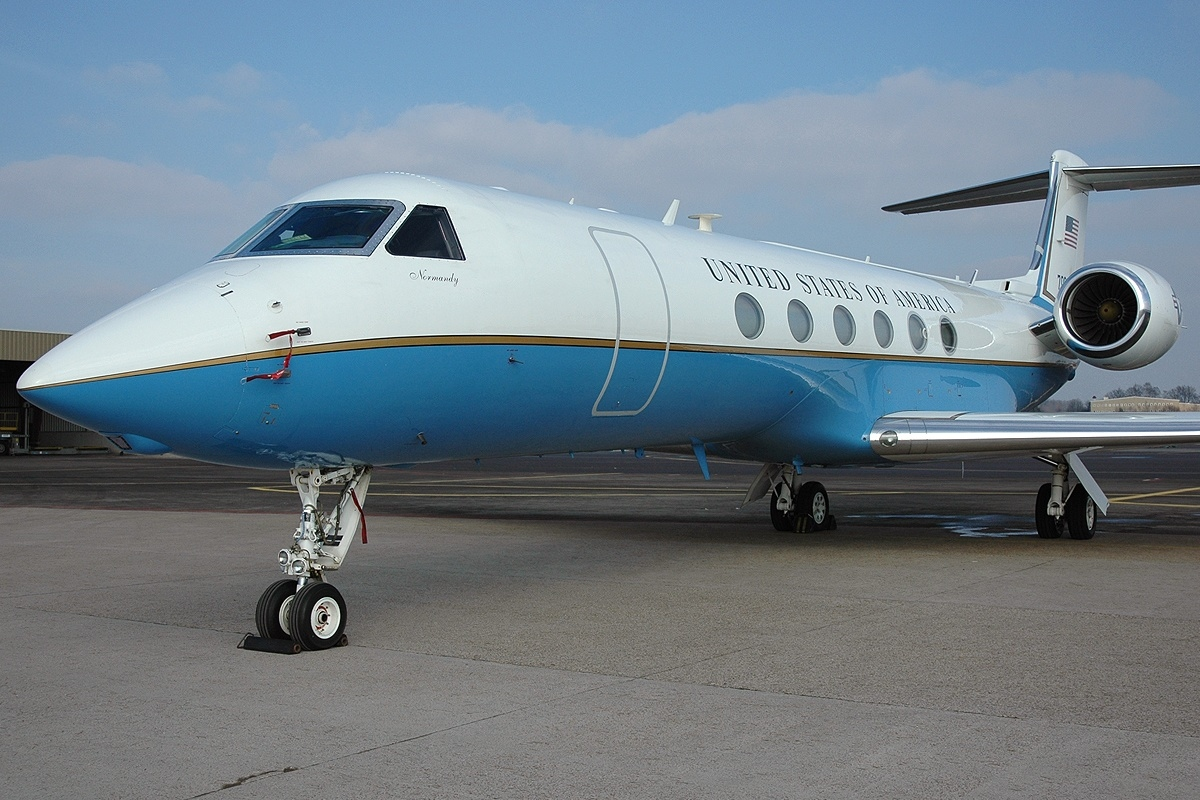
Gulfstream Aerospace C-37A, the military designation of the Gulfstream V, parked at Luxembourg

OMB Circular A-126, revised May 22, 1992, is a Government circular that introduces standards and policies to minimize the cost and improve the management and use of United States Government aircraft. Specifically, OMB Circular A-126 addresses the acquisition, management, usage, cost accounting, and disposal of government aircraft.

All policies presented by this circular apply to Executive Agencies, with special policy covering the travel by senior officials or non-Federal travelers on government aircraft that is government-owned, leased, chartered or rented and any related services that apply. The only exceptions are aircraft that is in use by or in support of the President or Vice President of the United States

The Office of Management and Budget was created in 1921 under the authority of the Budget and Accounting Act, revised in 1950 as the Budget and Accounting Procedures Act; again in 1970 as Reorganization Plan No. 2; as Executive Order 11541 and 31 U.S.C. § 1344.

== Use and travel on government aircraft ==
Note: The sections below are intended only as a summary of government aircraft use policy. For specific concerns or questions about official government flight policy, refer to the official circular at the Office of Management and Budget

As stated in the circular, government aircraft are to be used for "defined official purposes", which is restricted to three categories:

1. "[T]ravel to meet mission requirements" i.e., travel to discharge an agency's official responsibilities
2. "[R]equired use travel" i.e., government aircraft are required to meet "bona fide communications or security needs" or as dictated by "exceptional scheduling requirements"
3. "[O]ther travel for the conduct of agency business"

There are outlined specifics that define "official travel" that must meet these specific criteria:

- when no commercial airline or aircraft (including charter) service is reasonably available; specifically any schedule that does not meet the traveler's departure and/or arrival requirements within a 24-hour period
- the cost of government aircraft usage is not more than the cost of using commercial airline or aircraft, including charter flights
- aircraft may not be used on a "space available" basis unless:
  - the aircraft is already scheduled for an official purpose
  - the "space available" does not require a larger aircraft than needed
  - the "space available" use results in a minor additional cost to the government

=== Cost and reimbursement ===
The following conditions are not considered official business and require reimbursement to the government:

- incidental private travel activities of an employee undertaken while on official travel that result in increased operating costs
- wholly personal or political trips (reimbursement level set at "the full coach fare")
- official trip during which political activities are attended and engaged in (the appropriate share of the full coach fare)
- in which the employee flies to one or more locations for personal reasons (the excess of the full coach fare for all flights taken above the cost of the full coach fare to official business destinations)

The government is reimbursed for the cost or portion of the "full coach fare" applicable to the time not spent on required use travel. The "full coach fare" is defined as the cost of a ticket on a commercial airline available to the general public between the time the travel was planned and the day the travel was taken. For political travel, other laws and regulations may apply that require reimbursement in an amount greater than the "full coach fare".

=== Approval and documentation for government travel ===
Typically only an agency head or officials that are designated by the agency head may approve the use of agency aircraft, but government aircraft may also be used when it is also designated to transport senior Federal officials, members of their families or other non-Federal travelers on a "space available" basis but only when a written certification is presented by the agency. This certification must show that the mission activity is bona fide and that the minimum mission requirements are not surpassed to transport the additional travelers not required for official business. In emergency situations, this certification may be produced after-the-fact.

At a minimum, those individuals appointed by the agency head must be one organizational level above the person(s) traveling. If this is not possible, then another appropriate approval is required.

Travel requests must also be approved in advance and in writing. This approval must be done on a trip-by-trip basis from the agency's senior legal official or their principal deputy. There are two exceptions:

- the agency head has determined that all travel by the individual qualifies as required use travel or
- the president has determined that all travel by the agency head qualifies as required use.

All use of government aircraft by agencies must be reported semi-annually to the General Services Administration (GSA). These reports must be formatted within GSA standards and must list the following information for trips taken during the preceding six-month period:

- name of each traveler
- official purpose of trip
- destination(s)
- the appropriate allocated share of the full operating cost of the trip

In addition to the GSA, summary data of these reports must also be submitted semi-annually to the OMB in the same format. The exception to this rule are any classified trips, which then must be maintained by the agency and be made available for review under authorization.

For all uses of federal aircraft, the following documentation must be retained for a minimum of two years:

- tail number of the plane used
- date(s) used
- name(s) of pilot(s) and flight crew
- purpose(s) of the flight
- the route(s) flown
- names of all passengers

=== Eligibility ===
Status as a federal employee does not automatically result in authorization for use of government aircraft. There are three categories of people who require advance authorization in writing:

- senior Federal officials
- members of their families
- non-Federal travelers

All authorizations must conform to the same policies as authorized agency travel.

In this circular, the term 'Senior Official' is defined by anyone employed by an Executive or independent agency at a payrate of Level I of the Executive Schedule or employed in the Executive Office of the President at a payrate of Level II of the Executive Schedule (5 U.S.C. §§ 5311–5318). Simply put, a 'Senior Official' is anyone who meets the criteria as being employed and paid at a rate equal to or greater than the basic pay equivalent to a member of the Senior Executive Service (5 U.S.C. § 5382).

Active duty military officers are exempted from this definition.

=== Audit responsibility ===
All agency officials with the statutory authority to procure aircraft must ensure that their policies and procedures comply with the requirements of OMB Circular A-76, and that those programs comply with the internal control requirements of OMB Circular A-123. Any material weaknesses must be reported to the president and the United States Congress.

The development of policies and procedures must be done in cooperation with the GSA. If the agency does not have systems that conform to these policies, a period of one year from the date of issuance of GSA standards is given to implement those systems.

=== Accounting ===
Those systems which are implemented that conform to GSA standards must permit justification of use of government aircraft services and the determination of usage over commercial or alternative government aircraft; recovery of operation costs of the aircraft; the cost-effectiveness of their aircraft program; and cost-comparison to justify in-house operation of government aircraft in accordance with OMB Circular A-76.

== History ==
=== Use by Speaker of the House ===
Since the September 11, 2001 attacks, air transportation security has become a major issue for all aspects of American culture, including government transportation. Because of concerns for safety of elected government officials, the Speaker of the House—next in line behind the Vice President in the order of succession—has been granted use of military planes for secure travel services.

==== Nancy Pelosi ====
In February 2007, a controversy arose regarding the capability of aircraft for travel requested by newly elected House Speaker Nancy Pelosi (D-CA). The previous speaker, Rep. Dennis Hastert (R-IL), flew in a C-20 which is a modified version of a Gulfstream III. Pelosi requested an upgrade from this plane, which is incapable of flying non-stop the required 2,800+ miles to Pelosi's home district of San Francisco, California.

There was some question as to whether or not Pelosi's friends and associates would be allowed to travel with her, and that further consultation with the Air Force, and Department of Defense would be required.

=== Trump administration ===
After a number of news articles detailing the cost of flights on charter and government-owned aircraft, Senator Chuck Grassley (R-IA) sent a letter to the Trump administration, questioning recent travel by Secretary of Health and Human Services Tom Price, Treasury Secretary Steven Mnuchin, and EPA Administrator Scott Pruitt. Other administration officials named as having recently taken charter, military, or private aircraft were Interior Secretary Ryan Zinke and Veterans Affairs Secretary David Shulkin. The acting chief of the Office of Government Ethics, David J. Apol, issued a letter to agency heads asking them to ensure their actions are "motivated by the public good and not by personal interests."

==== Tom Price ====
In a series of reports starting in September 2017, Politico reported that since May 2017, Price had expended more than $1 million of Department funds for travel on private charter jets and military aircraft. Many of the flights were between cities that are easily accessible by train or car and have frequent, low-cost commercial airline service.

The reports from Politico sparked a larger inquiry into the use of private planes by Trump administration officials. The House Oversight Committee started a bipartisan investigation led by Representatives Trey Gowdy (R-SC) and Elijah Cummings (D-MD) of all use of private and government-owned planes by non-elected government officials of the Executive Branch on September 26, citing 5 U.S.C. § 5733, which states "The travel of an employee shall be by the most expeditious means of transportation practicable and shall be commensurate with the nature and purpose of the duties of the employee requiring such travel." Senator Grassley's letter to the White House asked to "detail what steps the administration has taken to ensure that cabinet secretaries use the most fiscally responsible travel in accordance with the public trust they hold and the spirit and letter of all laws, regulations, and policies that apply."

Price vowed to pay back $52,000, the cost of his share of travel that was "approved through the normal process". On September 29, Price resigned following what reporters called "an optics nightmare" for "the appearance of a millionaire Cabinet secretary flying routes easily navigated by far cheaper means."

==== Steven Mnuchin ====
After his wife, Louise Linton, posted a controversial photograph on August 21, 2017, to Instagram showing her deplaning a government jet in Kentucky, the Treasury Department's Office of the Inspector General (OIG) opened up an inquiry into Mnuchin's use of government aircraft. Mnuchin reimbursed the government for Linton's travel to Kentucky. According to the OIG's review, the total cost of the operating the Gulfstream C-37B to Louisville and Fort Knox was $26,900. The reimbursement of Linton's cost of travel was $595.90, as the typical reimbursement paid by requesting federal executive agencies only covers the cost of an equivalent coach ticket on a commercial flight.

The OIG released its report on October 4, 2017, concluding that there was "no violation of law in these requests and uses" of government aircraft by Mnuchin, but also expressing concern regarding "a disconnect between the standard of proof called for in the Daley memo and the actual amount of proof provided by Treasury and accepted by the White House in justifying these trip requests". The referenced Daley Memo was issued by then-White House Chief of Staff William M. Daley on April 4, 2011, and it stated the standards for use of government aircraft by senior executive branch officials were given in OMB Circular A-126, dated February 10, 1993. The Daley Memo also states that travel using military aircraft must be considered a White House Support Mission, taken at the specific direction of the president under one of a set of limited circumstances that "make commercial transportation unacceptable".

In the report, the OIG reviewed nine travel requests by Mnuchin for military air transportation since March 2017, of which seven were approved and taken, one was withdrawn, and one was approved with travel pending in late October 2017. The total cost of the seven trips taken was $811,800, calculated from per-hour cost and operating hours for the specific aircraft, or Air Force-provided direct costs of operations.
