= Office of E-Government & Information Technology =

Component of the United States Office of Management and Budget

The Office of E-Government & Information Technology, also called the E-Gov office or the Office of the Federal Chief Information Officer (OFCIO), develops and guides the U.S. federal government's use of Internet-based technologies for the public to interact with the government. The office is part of the Office of Management and Budget.

The E-Gov office is headed by the Federal Chief Information Officer of the United States.

== History ==
The E-Government Act of 2002 defined and authorized creation of this office.

== See also ==
- E-Government Unit, an analogous office in the United Kingdom.
- E-Government
- E-Governance
