= OMB Circular A-11 =

OMB Circular A-11 ("Preparation, Submission, and Execution of the Budget") is a United States government circular that addresses budget preparation for federal agencies, and is "the primary document that instructs agencies how to prepare and submit budget requests for OMB review and approval". The circular is revised and reissued periodically, with the version current as of 2016 being divided into seven parts.

Some policy changes have been enacted through historical versions of this document. The Reagan Administration abandoned zero-based budgeting through the version of OMB Circular A-11 promulgated in 1981.
