= OMB Circular A-123 =

OMB Circular A-123 is a US Office of Management and Budget (OMB) Government circular that defines the management responsibilities for internal controls in Federal agencies. It was first issued in 1981 by OMB's Office of Federal Financial Management and underwent numerous updates through 2016. The Circular is addressed to all federal chief financial officers, chief information officers, and program managers. The most current circular update (2016) was signed by then-director Shaun Donovan.

The 2004 update to Circular A-123 is a re-examination of the existing internal control requirements for Federal agencies and was initiated in light of the new internal control requirements for publicly traded companies contained in the Sarbanes-Oxley Act of 2002. The circular and the statute it implements, the Federal Managers’ Financial Integrity Act of 1982, are at the center of the existing Federal requirements to improve internal financial controls.
