= Office of Federal Procurement Policy =

Component of the United States Office of Management and Budget

Agency overview
- Formed: 1974
- Preceding agency: Office of Management and Budget
- Headquarters: Eisenhower Executive Office Building
- Agency executives: Kevin Rhodes, Administrator; Mathew Blum, Deputy Administrator; Matt Dickinson, Deputy to the Administrator
- Parent agency: Office of Management and Budget
- Website: whitehouse.gov/omb/procurement_default/

The Office of Federal Procurement Policy (OFPP) is a component of the United States Office of Management and Budget (OMB), which is part of the Executive Office of the President of the United States (EOP). OFPP was established by the U.S. Congress in 1974 through the Office of Federal Procurement Policy Act (Public Law 93-400) OFPP provides overall direction for government-wide procurement procedures and "to promote economy, efficiency, and effectiveness in acquisition processes." OFPP is headed by an Administrator who is appointed by the President and confirmed by the Senate. In April 2025, President Donald Trump nominated Kevin Rhodes to be the next Administrator. Rhodes was confirmed on October 7, 2025 and sworn in on October 15, 2025.

== Statutory authority and evolution ==
OFPP was established by law in 1974 to guide federal-government-wide procurement policies, regulations and procedures. OFPP plays a central role in overseeing the development of the Federal Acquisition Regulations (FAR), the principal set of rules governing how executive agencies acquire goods and services. OFPP staff review all proposed changes to the FAR and agency supplements.

Key amendments related to OFPP include:

- 1983 Amendment (Public Law 98-191): Mandated that the head of each executive agency designate a Senior Procurement Executive to be responsible for the management direction of the agency's procurement system, further aiding OFPP's government-wide coordination.
- Office of Federal Procurement Policy Act Amendments of 1988: Established the Federal Acquisition Regulatory Council (FAR Council), consisting of the Administrator for Federal Procurement Policy, the Secretary of Defense, the Administrator of NASA, and the Administrator of GSA. The Council was directed to issue and maintain a single government-wide procurement regulation (the FAR). The 1988 Act also affirmed the authority of the Cost Accounting Standards Board (CASB) to promulgate and enforce cost accounting standards, with the Administrator of Federal Procurement Policy chairing the CASB.

== Major legislative milestones and reforms ==
OFPP has played a significant role in major acquisition laws, often guiding their implementation and the resulting changes to the FAR. These Milestones include:

Law	Year	Key Impact on Federal Procurement	Ref.
Competition in Contracting Act (CICA)	1984	Increased the use of full and open competition in federal contracting.	
Federal Acquisition Streamlining Act (FASA)	1994	Simplified the acquisition process, particularly for commercial items, increasing efficiency and reducing administrative burdens.	
Clinger-Cohen Act (or Federal Acquisition Reform Act)	1996	Modernized the IT acquisition process and emphasized performance-based contracting and greater accountability.	
Services Acquisition Reform Act (SARA)	2003	Focused on improving the acquisition of services, which had become a dominant part of federal spending.	

== OFPP Administrator ==
The OFPP Administrator is appointed by the US president and confirmed by the Senate. Dr. Kevin Rhodes was confirmed by the Senate on October 7, 2025 as the 16th individual to serve as Administrator. This Senate-confirmed role provides the overall direction for the Federal Acquisition Regulation (FAR) and the entire federal acquisition system.

The Administrator is the Chief Policy Officer for all government contracts within the Office of Management and Budget. This is a role has substantial scope: it oversees the policies and regulations for the Federal Government's annual contract spending, which currently exceeds $815 billion—making the U.S. government the world's largest purchaser of goods and services.

The office's strategic mandate extends beyond accounting; it is to ensure that this vast purchasing power is leveraged to drive critical national priorities, from promoting sustainability and enhancing cybersecurity to expanding opportunities for small businesses and improving the entire federal acquisition system.

Below is a table of the previous 15 Senate-confirmed OFPP Administrators

Number	Administrator	Term dates
16th	Kevin Rhodes	October 15, 2025 – Present
15th	Michael E. Wooten	August 1, 2019 – January 20, 2021
14th	Anne Rung	September 11, 2014 – September 30, 2016
13th	Joseph G. Jordan (Joe)	May 24, 2012 – January 31, 2014
12th	Daniel I. Gordon (Dan)	November 21, 2009 – December 31, 2011
11th	Paul A. Dennett	August 3, 2006 – September 2008
10th	David Safavian	November 21, 2004 – September 16, 2005
9th	Angela Styles	May 24, 2001 – September 15, 2003
8th	Deidre A. Lee	July 30, 1998 – March 2000
7th	Steven Kelman	November 20, 1993 – September 12, 1997
6th	Allan V. Burman	March 1, 1990 – November 1993
5th	Robert P. Bedell	October 8, 1986 – 1988
4th	Donald E. Sowle	June 16, 1981 – January 1985
3rd	Karen Hastie Williams	March 24, 1980 – February 1981
2nd	Lester A. Fettig	May 9, 1977 – April 1979
1st	Hugh E. Witt	December 19, 1974 – January 1977

== See also ==
- Government procurement
- Federal Acquisition Regulation
- System for Award Management
- Government procurement in the United States
- Top 100 Contractors of the U.S. federal government
- Sustainable procurement
