= Office of Federal Financial Management =

Component of the United States Office of Management and Budget

Agency overview
- Formed: 1990
- Preceding agency: Office of Management and Budget
- Headquarters: New Executive Office Building
- Parent agency: Office of Management and Budget
- Website: Office of Federal Financial Management

The Office of Federal Financial Management (OFFM) is a component of the United States Office of Management and Budget (OMB), which is part of the Executive Office of the President of the United States (EOP).

The President of the United States appoints the controller, who serves as the chief officer of OFFM. The current acting OFFM Controller is John C. Pasquantino.

== Organization ==
OFFM is made up of two branches: the Management Controls and Assistance Branch and the Accountability, Performance and Reporting Branch.

== Mission and responsibilities ==
OFFM's mission is to support the effective and transparent use of Federal financial resources. OFFM's responsibilities includes implementing the financial management priorities of the President, establishing government-wide financial management policies of executive agencies and carrying out the financial management functions of the CFO Act of 1990.

OFFM's priorities include transparency and data management, shared services, real property, improper payments, grants management, internal control, federal financial reporting, debt collection and charge cards.

== History ==
OFFM was established by the Chief Financial Officers Act (CFO Act) of 1990.
