= Title 2 of the Code of Federal Regulations =

US title on grants and agreements

Title 2 of the Code of Federal Regulations (2 CFR), titled Grants and Agreements, is a United States federal-government regulation.

As of the January 1, 2022 revision, Title 2 comprises two subtitles: Subtitle A, Office of Management and Budget Guidance for Grants and Agreements, and Subtitle B, Federal Agency Regulations for Grants and Agreements.
