= OMB Circular A-21 =

United States government circular

OMB Circular A-21 is a Government circular that sets forth the rules governing the eligibility and calculation of costs in support of sponsored research, development, training and other works produced in agreement with the United States Federal Government, but does not attempt to identify or dictate agency or institutional participation in those works. The last revision is dated May 10, 2004.

This circular is divided into ten sections:

== Purpose and Scope ==
This section outlines the principles and policies that must be followed regarding the accounting principles, arrangements, and exemptions for any training or work produced under the contract as agreed upon by the Federal Government.

== Definition of Terms ==
Lists connotative and denotative meanings for specific phrases used throughout the circular.

== Basic Considerations ==
This section outlines the responsibility necessitated when determining and justifying costs incurred throughout a project, and what is to be expected in terms of accountability by the financial authority(ies) involved.

== Direct Costs ==
Direct costs are those measurable and accurate within the scope of the project.

== F&A Costs ==
F&A (Facilities and Administrative) costs are not necessarily tangible assets, but are those that are not immediately recognized and itemizable by all participants in the project or a given activity within the project. Recommendations for distribution and considerations of these costs are also covered.

== Identification and assignment of F&A costs ==
This section categorizes costs incurred as a result of expenses, services, operations and the depreciation of those costs.

== Determination and application of F&A cost rate(s) ==
All F&A costs must be determined and negotiated pertaining to the scope of the project, and there are limitations and procedures outlined for the accounting of these cost rates.

== Simplified method for small institutions ==
This section truncates the identification, assignment, determination, and application of cost rates when applied to any work that does not exceed US $10 Million in a single fiscal year. These simplified procedures may be used to account for the total cost of a project or work produced under the contract.

== General provisions for selected items of cost ==
This section covers permissible and nonpermissible costs involved in a project. To simplify, the following costs are allowed (within the circular guidelines):

- Advertising and Public relations
- Reasonable civil defense costs
- Communication costs
- Salaries, Wages, fringe benefits and those acceptable criteria
- Equipment and Asset and Services Rendered, with exceptions
- Travel

Anything outside the scope of these costs is typically not allowed unless it falls under one of the specifically mentioned exceptions within the circular.

== Certification of charges ==
This is a short form that requires the named institution, signature, name of official, title, and date, that when collected certifies that all costs have been accounted for and are within the cost guidelines, under penalty of perjury.
