= Office of Management and Budget =

Office in the Executive Office of the US President

Agency overview
- Formed: July 1, 1970; 56 years ago
- Preceding agency: Bureau of the Budget
- Headquarters: Eisenhower Executive Office Building, Washington, D.C., U.S.
- Employees: 448
- Annual budget: $141 million (FY 2022)
- Agency executives: Russell Vought, Director; Hal Duncan, Deputy Director; Eric Ueland, Deputy Director for Management
- Parent agency: Executive Office of the President of the United States
- Child agencies: Office of Information and Regulatory Affairs; Office of the Intellectual Property Enforcement Coordinator; Office of E-Government & Information Technology; Office of Federal Financial Management; Office of Federal Procurement Policy

The Office of Management and Budget (OMB) is the largest office (Note: In terms of number of employees and budget.) within the Executive Office of the President of the United States and is responsible for implementing the president's agenda across the executive branch. The Headquarters of the Office of Management and Budget are located at the Eisenhower Executive Office Building in Washington, D.C.

In 1921, Congress passed legislation to create the Bureau of the Budget to assist the president in developing his budget to be enacted or rejected by the House of Representatives under Article One of the Constitution. In 1970, President Richard Nixon led the reorganization of the bureau into its current form as the OMB reporting directly to the president.

Originally intended to be a politically neutral and analytical organization, the 1970 restructuring transformed the OMB from a simple budget office to one of the most powerful institutions directly under the president's control. Successive presidents have expanded the scope of duties and power of the OMB, with occasional but limited pushback from Congress. Most notably, Congress enacted legislation in 1974 to form a congressional counterpart to the OMB, the Congressional Budget Office along with other laws including to limit presidential impoundment.

Russell Vought is the current director of the OMB, appointed by Donald Trump in February 2025.

== History ==
The Bureau of the Budget, OMB's predecessor, was established in 1921 as a part of the Department of the Treasury by the Budget and Accounting Act of 1921, which President Warren G. Harding signed into law. The Bureau of the Budget was moved to the Executive Office of the President in 1939 and was run by Harold D. Smith during the government's rapid expansion of spending during World War II. James L. Sundquist, a staffer at the Bureau of the Budget, called the relationship between the president and the bureau extremely close and subsequent bureau directors have been politicians, not public administrators.

The bureau was reorganized into the Office of Management and Budget in 1970 during the Nixon administration. The first OMB included Roy Ash (head), Paul O'Neill (assistant director), Fred Malek (deputy director), Frank Zarb (associate director) and two dozen others.

In the 1990s, OMB was reorganized to remove the distinction between management staff and budgetary staff by combining the dual roles into each given program examiner within the Resource Management Offices.

== Purpose ==
OMB prepares the president's budget proposal to Congress and supervises the administration of the executive branch agencies. It evaluates the effectiveness of agency programs, policies, and procedures, assesses competing funding demands among agencies, and sets funding priorities. OMB ensures that agency reports, rules, testimony, and proposed legislation are consistent with the president's budget and administration policies.

OMB also oversees and coordinates the administration's procurement, financial management, information, and regulatory policies. In each of these areas, OMB's role is to help improve administrative management, develop better performance measures and coordinating mechanisms, and reduce unnecessary burdens on the public.

OMB's critical missions are:

1. Budget development and execution, a prominent government-wide process managed by the Executive Office of the President (EOP) and a device by which a president implements their policies, priorities, and actions in everything from the Department of Defense to NASA.
2. Managing other agencies' financials, paperwork, and IT.

== Structure ==
=== Overview ===
OMB is made up mainly of career appointed staff who provide continuity across changes of party and administration in the White House. Six positions within OMB – the director, the deputy director, the deputy director for management, and the administrators of the Office of Information and Regulatory Affairs, the Office of Federal Procurement Policy, and the Office of Federal Financial Management – are presidentially appointed and Senate-confirmed positions.

OMB's largest components are the five Resource Management Offices, which are organized along functional lines mirroring the federal government, each led by an OMB associate director. Approximately half of all OMB staff are assigned to these offices, the majority of whom are designated as program examiners. Program examiners can be assigned to monitor one or more federal agencies or may be deployed by a topical area, such as monitoring issues relating to U.S. Navy warships. These staff have dual responsibility for both management and budgetary issues, as well as for giving expert advice on all aspects relating to their programs. Each year they review federal agency budget requests and help decide what resource requests will be sent to Congress as part of the president's budget. They perform in-depth program evaluations with the Program Assessment Rating Tool, review proposed regulations and agency testimony, analyze pending legislation, and oversee the aspects of the president's management agenda including agency management scorecards. They are often called upon to provide analysis information to EOP staff. They also provide important information to those assigned to the statutory offices within OMB: the Office of Information and Regulatory Affairs, the Office of Federal Procurement Policy, the Office of Federal Financial Management, and the Office of E-Government & Information Technology, which specializes in issues such as federal regulations and procurement policy and law.

Other components are OMB-wide support offices, including the Office of General Counsel, the Office of Legislative Affairs, the Budget Review Division (BRD), and the Legislative Reference Division. The BRD performs government-wide budget coordination and is largely responsible for the technical aspects relating to the release of the president's budget each February. With respect to the estimation of spending for the executive branch, the BRD serves a purpose parallel to that of the Congressional Budget Office (which was created in response to the OMB) for estimating Congressional spending, the Department of the Treasury for estimating executive branch revenue, and the Joint Committee on Taxation for estimating Congressional revenue.

The Legislative Reference Division is the federal government's central clearing house for proposed legislation or testimony by federal officials. It distributes proposed legislation and testimony to all relevant federal reviewers and distills the comments into a consensus opinion of the administration about the proposal. It is also responsible for writing an Enrolled Bill Memorandum to the president once a bill is presented by both chambers of Congress for the president's signature. The Enrolled Bill Memorandum details the bill's particulars, opinions on the bill from relevant federal departments, and an overall opinion about whether it should be signed into law or vetoed. It also issues Statements of Administration Policy that let Congress know the White House's official position on proposed legislation.

=== Role in the executive budget process ===
In practice, the president has assigned the OMB certain responsibilities when it comes to the budget and hiring authorities who play key roles in developing it. OMB coordinates the development of the president's budget proposal by issuing circulars, memoranda, and guidance documents to the heads of executive agencies. The OMB works very closely with executive agencies in making sure the budget process and proposal is smooth.

The development of the budget within the executive branch has many steps and takes nearly a year to complete. The first step is the OMB informing the president of the country's economic situation. The next step is known as the Spring Guidance: the OMB gives executive agencies instructions on policy guidance to use when coming up with their budget requests along with due dates for them to submit their requests. The OMB then works with the agencies to discuss issues in the upcoming budget. In July, the OMB issues circular A-11 to all agencies, which outlines instructions for submitting the budget proposals, which the agencies submit by September. The fiscal year begins October 1 and OMB staff meet with senior agency representatives to find out whether their proposals are in line with the president's priorities and policies and identify constraints within the budget proposal until late November. The OMB director then meets with the president and EOP advisors to discuss the agencies' budget proposals and recommends a federal budget proposal, and the agencies are notified of the decisions about their requests. They can appeal to OMB and the president in December if they are dissatisfied with the decisions. After working together to resolve issues, agencies and OMB prepare a budget justification document to present to relevant congressional committees, especially the Appropriations Committee. Finally, by the first Monday in February, the president must review and submit the final budget to Congress to approve.

OMB is also responsible for the preparation of Statements of Administrative Policy (SAPs) with the president. These statements allow the OMB to communicate the president's and agencies' policies to the government as a whole and set forth policymakers' agendas. During the review of the federal budget, interest groups can lobby for policy change and affect the budget for the new year. OMB plays a key role in policy conflicts by making sure legislation and agencies' actions are consistent with the executive branch's. OMB has a powerful and influential role in the government, basically making sure its day-to-day operations run. Without a budget, federal employees could not be paid, federal buildings could not open and federal programs would come to a halt in a government shutdown. Shutdowns can occur when Congress refuses to pass a budget.

=== Suspension and debarment ===
The Interagency Suspension and Debarment Committee (ISDC) was created as an OMB committee by President Ronald Reagan's Executive Order 12549 in 1986, for the purpose of monitoring the implementation of the order. This order mandates executive departments and agencies to:

- participate in a government-wide suspension and debarment system,
- issue regulations with government-wide criteria and minimum due process procedures when debarring or suspending participants, and
- send debarred and suspended participants' identifying information to the General Services Administration for inclusion on a list of excluded persons, now known as the System for Award Management (SAM).

=== Circulars ===
Circulars are instructions or information the OMB issues to federal agencies that are indexed by major category: Budget, State and Local Governments, Educational and Non-Profit Institutions, Federal Procurement, Federal Financial Management, Federal Information Resources / Data Collection and Other Special Purpose.

Circular NO. A-119 Circular A-119 is for federal participation in the development and use of voluntary consensus standards and in conformity assessment activities. A-119 instructs its agencies to adopt voluntary consensus standards before relying upon industry standards and reducing to a minimum the reliance by agencies on government standards. Adoption of international standards is widely followed by U.S. agencies. This includes:

- Environmental Protection Agency referencing ISO 14001 supporting public policy in environmental management
- Department of Energy referencing ISO 50001 supporting public policy for energy performance aligned with the International Energy Agency
- Department of Labor referencing ISO 45001 supporting public policy in occupational health and safety
- Food and Drug Administration referencing ISO 13485 supporting public policy in medical devices
- Food and Drug Administration referencing ISO 22000 supporting public policy in food products

=== Organization ===
- Director of the Office of Management and Budget
  - Deputy Director, OMB
  - Executive Associate Director of OMB
    - Office of General Counsel
    - Office of Legislative Affairs
    - Office of Communications
    - Office of Economic Policy (EP)
    - Management and Operations Division
    - Legislative Reference Division
    - Budget Review Division (BRD)
    - Resource Management Offices
      - Natural Resource Programs
      - Education, Income Maintenance, and Labor Programs
      - Health Programs
      - General Government Programs
      - National Security Programs
  - Deputy Director for Management (Chief Performance Officer of the United States)
    - Office of Performance and Personnel Management (OPPM)
    - Office of Federal Financial Management (OFFM)
    - Office of Federal Procurement Policy (OFPP)
    - Office of E-Government & Information Technology (administrator: Federal Chief Information Officer of the United States)
      - Cyber and National Security Unit
      - United States Digital Service (USDS)
    - Office of Information and Regulatory Affairs (OIRA)
    - Office of the Intellectual Property Enforcement Coordinator (IPEC)

==== Current appointees ====
- Director: Russell Vought
  - Deputy Director: Vacant
    - General Counsel: Mark Paoletta
  - Deputy Director for Management (Chief Performance Officer of the United States): Eric Ueland
    - Controller of the Office of Federal Financial Management: TBA
    - Administrator of the Office of Federal Procurement Policy: TBA
    - Administrator of the Office of E-Government and Information Technology (Federal Chief Information Officer of the United States): Greg Barbaccia
    - Administrator of the Office of Information and Regulatory Affairs: Mark Paoletta (performing the duties)
      - Chief Statistician of the United States: Stuart Levenbach

== List of directors ==
List of OMB directors.

Denotes acting capacity.

Image	Name	Start	End	Notes	President
	Charles Dawes	June 23, 1921	June 30, 1922		Warren G. Harding (1921–1923)
	Herbert Lord	July 1, 1922	May 31, 1929		Warren G. Harding (1921–1923)
	Herbert Lord	July 1, 1922	May 31, 1929		Calvin Coolidge (1923–1929)
	Herbert Lord	July 1, 1922	May 31, 1929		Herbert Hoover (1929–1933)
	Clawson Roop	August 15, 1929	March 3, 1933		Herbert Hoover (1929–1933)
	Lewis Douglas	March 7, 1933	August 31, 1934		Franklin D. Roosevelt (1933–1945)
	Daniel Bell	September 1, 1934	April 14, 1939		Franklin D. Roosevelt (1933–1945)
	Harold Smith	April 15, 1939	June 19, 1946		Franklin D. Roosevelt (1933–1945)
	Harold Smith	April 15, 1939	June 19, 1946		Harry S. Truman (1945–1953)
	James Webb	July 13, 1946	January 27, 1949		Harry S. Truman (1945–1953)
	Frank Pace	February 1, 1949	April 12, 1950		Harry S. Truman (1945–1953)
	Fred Lawton	April 13, 1950	January 21, 1953		Harry S. Truman (1945–1953)
	Joseph Dodge	January 22, 1953	April 15, 1954		Dwight D. Eisenhower (1953–1961)
	Rowland Hughes	April 16, 1954	April 1, 1956		Dwight D. Eisenhower (1953–1961)
	Percival Brundage	April 2, 1956	March 17, 1958		Dwight D. Eisenhower (1953–1961)
	Maurice Stans	March 18, 1958	January 21, 1961		Dwight D. Eisenhower (1953–1961)
	David Bell	January 22, 1961	December 20, 1962		John F. Kennedy (1961–1963)
	Kermit Gordon	December 28, 1962	June 1, 1965		John F. Kennedy (1961–1963)
	Kermit Gordon	December 28, 1962	June 1, 1965		Lyndon B. Johnson (1963–1969)
	Charles Schultze	June 1, 1965	January 28, 1968		Lyndon B. Johnson (1963–1969)
	Charles Zwick	January 29, 1968	January 21, 1969		Lyndon B. Johnson (1963–1969)
	Bob Mayo	January 22, 1969	June 30, 1970		Richard Nixon (1969–1974)
	George Shultz	July 1, 1970	June 11, 1972		Richard Nixon (1969–1974)
	Caspar Weinberger	June 12, 1972	February 1, 1973		Richard Nixon (1969–1974)
	Roy Ash	February 2, 1973	February 3, 1975		Richard Nixon (1969–1974)
	Roy Ash	February 2, 1973	February 3, 1975		Gerald Ford (1974–1977)
	James Lynn	February 10, 1975	January 20, 1977		Gerald Ford (1974–1977)
	Bert Lance	January 21, 1977	September 23, 1977		Jimmy Carter (1977–1981)
	Jim McIntyre	September 24, 1977	January 20, 1981		Jimmy Carter (1977–1981)
	David Stockman	January 21, 1981	August 1, 1985		Ronald Reagan (1981–1989)
	Jim Miller	October 8, 1985	October 15, 1988		Ronald Reagan (1981–1989)
	Joe Wright	October 16, 1988	January 20, 1989		Ronald Reagan (1981–1989)
	Dick Darman	January 25, 1989	January 20, 1993		George H. W. Bush (1989–1993)
	Leon Panetta	January 21, 1993	July 17, 1994		Bill Clinton (1993–2001)
	Alice Rivlin	October 17, 1994	April 26, 1996		Bill Clinton (1993–2001)
	Frank Raines	September 13, 1996	May 21, 1998		Bill Clinton (1993–2001)
	Jack Lew	May 21, 1998	January 19, 2001		Bill Clinton (1993–2001)
	Mitch Daniels	January 23, 2001	June 6, 2003		George W. Bush (2001–2009)
	Josh Bolten	June 6, 2003	April 15, 2006		George W. Bush (2001–2009)
	Rob Portman	May 26, 2006	June 19, 2007		George W. Bush (2001–2009)
	Jim Nussle	September 4, 2007	January 20, 2009		George W. Bush (2001–2009)
	Peter Orszag	January 20, 2009	July 30, 2010		Barack Obama (2009–2017)
	Jeff Zients; Acting	July 30, 2010	November 18, 2010		Barack Obama (2009–2017)
	Jack Lew	November 18, 2010	January 27, 2012		Barack Obama (2009–2017)
	Jeff Zients; Acting	January 27, 2012	April 24, 2013		Barack Obama (2009–2017)
	Sylvia Mathews Burwell	April 24, 2013	June 9, 2014		Barack Obama (2009–2017)
	Brian Deese; Acting	June 9, 2014	July 28, 2014		Barack Obama (2009–2017)
	Shaun Donovan	July 28, 2014	January 20, 2017		Barack Obama (2009–2017)
	Mark Sandy; Acting	January 20, 2017	February 16, 2017		Donald Trump (2017–2021)
	Mick Mulvaney	February 16, 2017	March 31, 2020; On leave: January 2, 2019 – March 31, 2020	Became Acting White House Chief of Staff on January 2, 2019, but remained OMB Director through the rest of his tenure.	Donald Trump (2017–2021)
	Russ Vought	January 2, 2019	July 22, 2020	Initially Acting Director during Mulvaney's service as Acting White House Chief of Staff continued until Vought was confirmed.	Donald Trump (2017–2021)
	Russ Vought	July 22, 2020	January 20, 2021	Initially Acting Director during Mulvaney's service as Acting White House Chief of Staff continued until Vought was confirmed.	Donald Trump (2017–2021)
	Rob Fairweather; Acting	January 20, 2021	March 24, 2021		Joe Biden (2021–2025)
	Shalanda Young	March 24, 2021	March 17, 2022	While Young was acting director, Jason Miller assumed duties during her maternal leave from October 2021 – December 2021.	Joe Biden (2021–2025)
	Shalanda Young	March 17, 2022	January 20, 2025	While Young was acting director, Jason Miller assumed duties during her maternal leave from October 2021 – December 2021.	Joe Biden (2021–2025)
	Matthew Vaeth; Acting	January 20, 2025	February 7, 2025		Donald Trump (2025–present)
	Russ Vought	February 7, 2025	Incumbent		Donald Trump (2025–present)

== See also ==
- Learning agenda
- Title 2 of the Code of Federal Regulations
- Title 5 of the Code of Federal Regulations
- United States federal budget
- Office of Federal Financial Management
- Office of Federal Procurement Policy
- Government procurement in the United States
- Office of E-Government & Information Technology
- Office of Information and Regulatory Affairs
  - Chief Statistician of the United States
- Data.gov
