= James E. Boyd (scientist) =

American physicist and administrator (1906–1998)

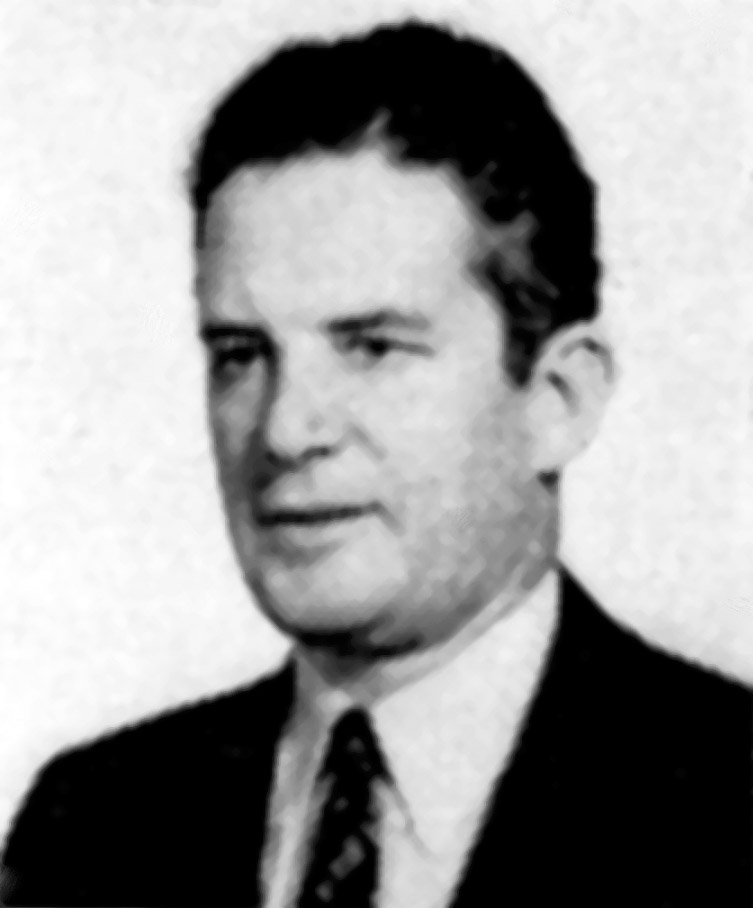
- Born: July 18, 1906; Tignall, Georgia, U.S.
- Died: February 18, 1998 (aged 91); Carrollton, Georgia, U.S.
- Education: University of Georgia (BA); Duke University (MA); Yale University (PhD)
- Scientific career
- Workplaces: University of Georgia; Yale University; University of West Georgia; Georgia Institute of Technology; United States Navy; Georgia Tech Research Institute; Scientific Atlanta
- Notable students: Glen P. Robinson

James Emory Boyd (July 18, 1906 – February 18, 1998) was an American physicist, mathematician, and academic administrator. He was director of the Georgia Tech Research Institute from 1957 to 1961, president of West Georgia College (now the University of West Georgia) from 1961 to 1971, and acting president of the Georgia Institute of Technology from 1971 to 1972.

A graduate of the University of Georgia, Duke University, and Yale University, Boyd began in academia as an instructor of physics at the University of Georgia, then head of the Mathematics and Science Department at West Georgia College. Subsequently, he became a professor at Georgia Tech and a prominent researcher at the Engineering Experiment Station, now known as the Georgia Tech Research Institute. At the Engineering Experiment Station, Boyd helped spur the organization's mainstay: federally funded electronics research and development. Along with fellow Georgia Tech researchers Gerald Rosselot and Glen P. Robinson, Boyd was influential in the founding of Scientific Atlanta, where he was a board member for 25 years. As director of the Engineering Experiment Station, Boyd focused on the recruitment of talented engineers and an increase in physical space available to the organization, including the establishment of nuclear research at Georgia Tech with a radioisotopes laboratory and the construction of the Frank H. Neely Research Reactor.

While he was the third president of West Georgia College, Boyd increased the numbers of faculty members, degrees awarded, programs offered, and enrolled undergraduate and graduate students. Boyd racially integrated the campus in 1963, and oversaw immense construction projects that dramatically expanded the campus to support the increased (and future) enrollment. Hired away to serve as the University System of Georgia's Vice Chancellor for Academic Development in 1970, he was almost immediately reassigned to be Georgia Tech's interim president. During his tenure at Georgia Tech from 1971 to 1972, Boyd resolved difficult issues in the attempted takeover of the Engineering Experiment Station by previous Georgia Tech president Arthur G. Hansen and the poor performance of (and corresponding alumni calls to remove) head football coach Bud Carson.

== Early career ==
=== Education ===
Boyd was born to Emory Fortson and Rosa Lee (née Wright) Boyd on July 18, 1906, in Tignall, Georgia, a small town near the eastern border of the state of Georgia. He had two brothers, John and Ellis, and a sister, Sophia. In 1927, he received a Bachelor of Arts in mathematics from the University of Georgia, where he was a member of an honor society, Phi Beta Kappa. In 1928, he received a Master of Arts in mathematics from Duke University. From 1928 to 1930, Boyd was an instructor of physics at the University of Georgia. He entered graduate school at Yale University in 1930, and was a graduate assistant there from 1930 to 1931 and a Loomis Fellow from 1931 to 1933. (Note: The Loomis Fellowship was awarded to the student with the "best competitive examination" in physics who had completed at least one year of graduate education at Yale; the fellowship mandated study towards a PhD in physics.) He received his PhD in physics from Yale in 1933, with a thesis entitled Scattering of X-Rays by Cold-Worked and by Annealed Beryllium. In his thesis, Boyd described the effects of reflecting radiation through samples of powdered, cold-worked and annealed beryllium with differing particle sizes. The experiment showed that beryllium crystals are "rather imperfect", that annealing caused "no appreciable change" in beryllium's lattice structure, and that the mass absorption coefficient of beryllium found in the experiment was reasonably close to the theoretical value calculated using Compton's empirical formula.

Boyd was appointed as head of the Mathematics and Science Department at West Georgia College in 1933. In 1935, he joined the faculty at the Georgia Institute of Technology as an assistant professor of physics. Boyd married Elizabeth Reynolds Cobb, daughter of Betty Reynolds Cobb and Hiram Felix Cobb, on June 2, 1934. James and Elizabeth went on to have two children: a daughter, Betty Cobb Boyd (born August 26, 1939) and a son, James Fortson Boyd (born October 9, 1942). With World War II under way, Boyd joined the United States Navy in 1942, serving as a lieutenant and later lieutenant commander in the Bureau of Ordnance, performing research on radar. From 1945 to 1946, he was a commander in the Office of the Chief of Naval Operations where he worked on radar and electronics.

=== Researcher and entrepreneur ===
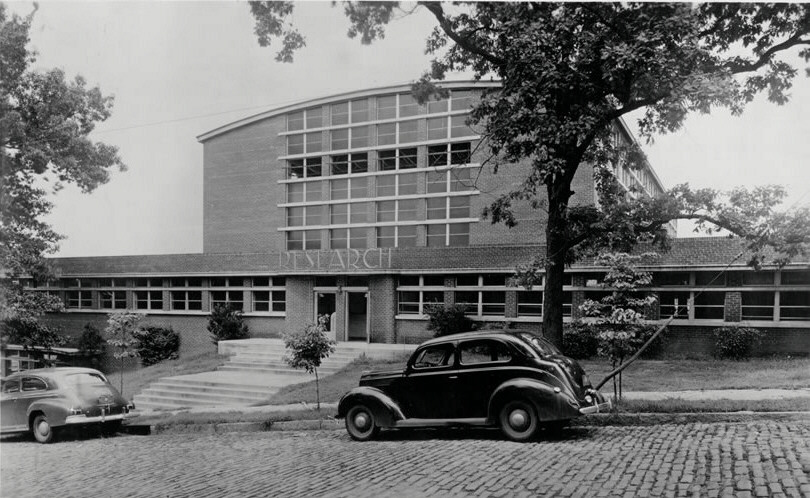
The main building of the Engineering Experiment Station, pictured in 1951

In 1946, Boyd returned to Georgia Tech's physics department and its Engineering Experiment Station, where he worked as Assistant Project Director under Frank Lawrence (and, after Lawrence's departure, as Project Director) on an Army Air Corps-sponsored project studying microwave propagation. As part of the project, he conducted long-range line-of-sight experiments between Georgia Tech and Mount Oglethorpe in North Georgia. In 1947, Boyd co-authored a study entitled Propagation Studies of Electromagnetic Waves, which resulted in a series of related research contracts, including a large one obtained from the Navy Bureau of Ordnance on radar-directed fire control. Boyd was promoted to professor of physics in 1948. Around 1950, under the authority of his rank of commander in the U.S. Navy Reserve, Boyd created a U.S. Navy Research Reserve Unit at Georgia Tech that included officers from both Georgia Tech and the Atlanta metropolitan area. In the 1950s, Boyd was promoted to captain and ran this unit until his departure from Georgia Tech.

Dr. Boyd is really considered the founder of Scientific Atlanta.

— Glen P. Robinson,

In 1950, Boyd was named the first head of the newly created Physics Division of the Engineering Experiment Station (now known as the Georgia Tech Research Institute). Boyd recruited his former student Glen P. Robinson to the station. In late 1951, Robinson, station director Gerald Rosselot and Boyd helped start Scientific Associates (now Scientific Atlanta, part of Cisco) with $700 in seed money to produce and market antenna products that were developed at the station, as the station's leadership did not think Georgia Tech should be involved in the manufacturing business. Georgia Tech vice president Cherry Emerson believed that EES employees' affiliation with Scientific Atlanta constituted a conflict of interest and asked Boyd, Rosselot, and Robinson to choose between the two organizations. Boyd resigned from his post at Scientific Atlanta and remained with Georgia Tech, but chose to retain his position on Scientific Atlanta's Board of Directors. According to Robinson, "Dr. Boyd is really considered the founder of Scientific Atlanta."

== Administrator ==
=== Experiment Station director ===
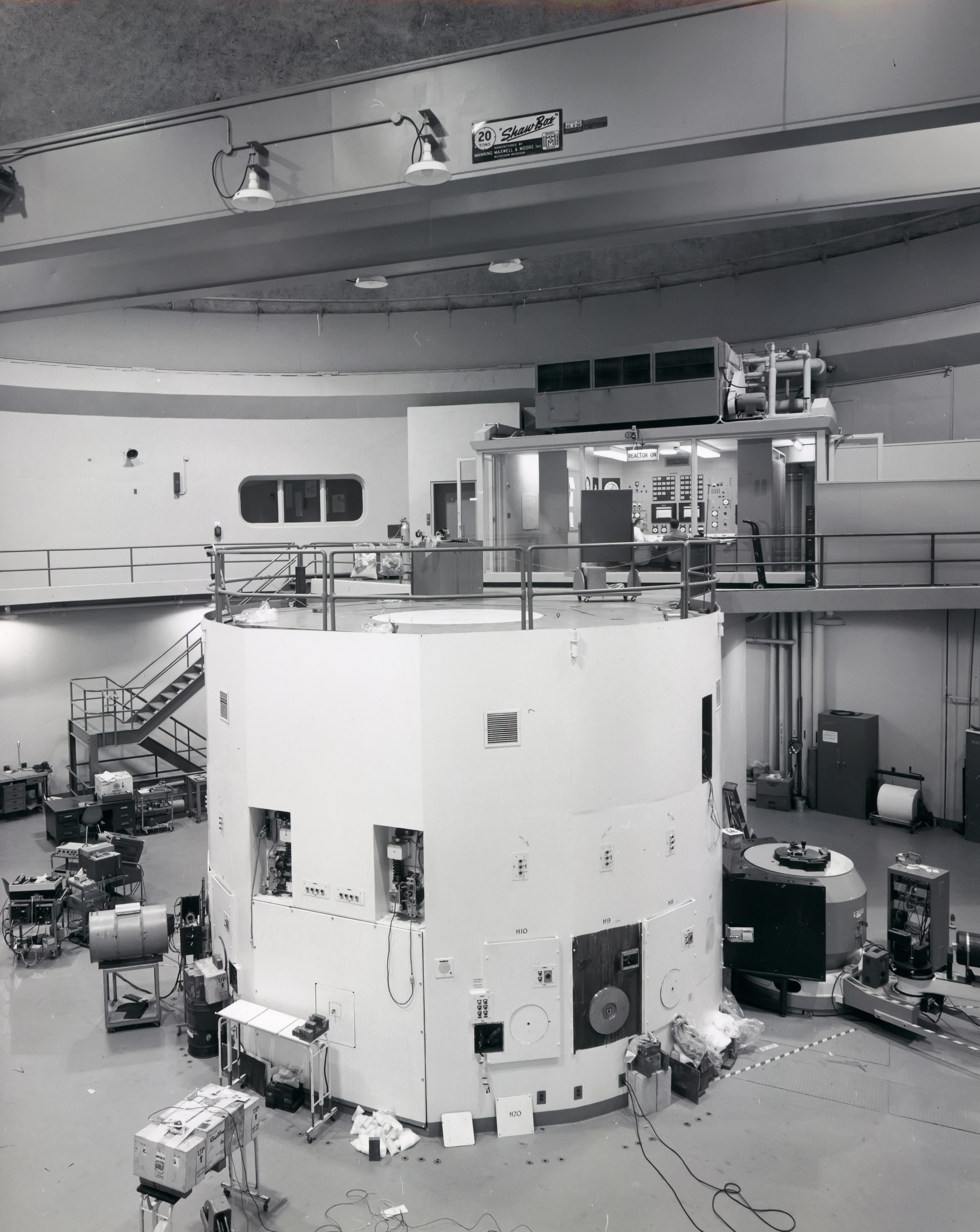
The Neely Research Reactor, which was built in part due to Boyd's influence.

Boyd was promoted to Assistant Director of Research at the Engineering Experiment Station in 1954. He served as director of the station from July 1, 1957, until 1961. While at Georgia Tech, Boyd wrote an influential article about the role of research centers at institutes of technology, which argued that research should be integrated with education; Boyd applied this by involving undergraduates in his day-to-day research. Boyd was known for his recruitment of faculty capable of both teaching and performing notable research. He was influential enough to be able to override the wishes of Joseph Howey, director of the School of Physics, on occasion: for example, Boyd successfully hired physicist Earl W. McDaniel in 1954 over Howey's determined opposition. (Note: Joseph Howey's opposition to hiring Earl W. McDaniel was based on a couple of incidents during McDaniel's undergraduate career involving alcohol, which Howey felt indicated a lack of decorum.)

Under Boyd's purview, the Engineering Experiment Station was awarded many electronics-related contracts, to the extent that an Electronics Division was created in 1959; it focused on radar and communications. In 1955, Georgia Tech president Blake R. Van Leer appointed Boyd to Georgia Tech's Nuclear Science Committee. The committee recommended the creation of a Radioisotopes Laboratory Facility and the construction of a large research reactor. The former was built and dedicated on January 7, 1959, and could receive, store, and process radioactive materials. The Frank H. Neely Research Reactor was completed in 1963 and was operational until 1996, when the fuel was removed because of safety concerns related to the nearby 1996 Summer Olympics events. (Note: Although the shut-down was initially only intended to be temporary, the reactor was never restarted.) In 1961, Boyd was succeeded in the directorship by Robert E. Stiemke, who had previously been the director of Georgia Tech's School of Civil Engineering.

=== West Georgia College president ===
Boyd became the third president of West Georgia College in 1961 after William H. Row died of a heart attack. Boyd is most known for his peaceful racial integration of the campus (without waiting for a court order) in 1963 by inviting a young black woman, Lillian Williams, to attend the college; she eventually earned two degrees in education and in 1985 received the college's highest honor, the Founder's Award. In May 1964, Boyd invited Robert F. Kennedy to the dedication of the campus chapel as the Kennedy Chapel, which was named after Robert's brother, U.S. President John F. Kennedy, who had been assassinated in November 1963. During his visit, Robert Kennedy promoted the Civil Rights Act of 1964, which was then under debate in the United States Senate.

Boyd dramatically expanded the college during his tenure, both in terms of headcount and academic diversity. Enrolment grew from 1,089 students upon his arrival in 1961 to 5,503 students on his departure in 1971. In 1959, there were two degrees and five programs available; in 1969–70 there were seven degrees and 45 programs. There were 94 graduate students in 1961; the first master's programs were offered in 1967, and by 1969 the number of graduate students had risen to 741. In 1969 alone, 80 new faculty members were hired, a number larger than the total number of faculty members a decade earlier. Several new buildings were constructed, including nine dormitories and five academic buildings. Policy changes occurred as well: in 1966, the curfew for junior and senior women was abolished, and fraternities and sororities were allowed on campus. In 1970, Boyd was named the University System of Georgia's first vice chancellor for academic development, effective once his successor (Emory graduate Ward B. Pafford) was appointed in 1971.

== Georgia Tech president ==
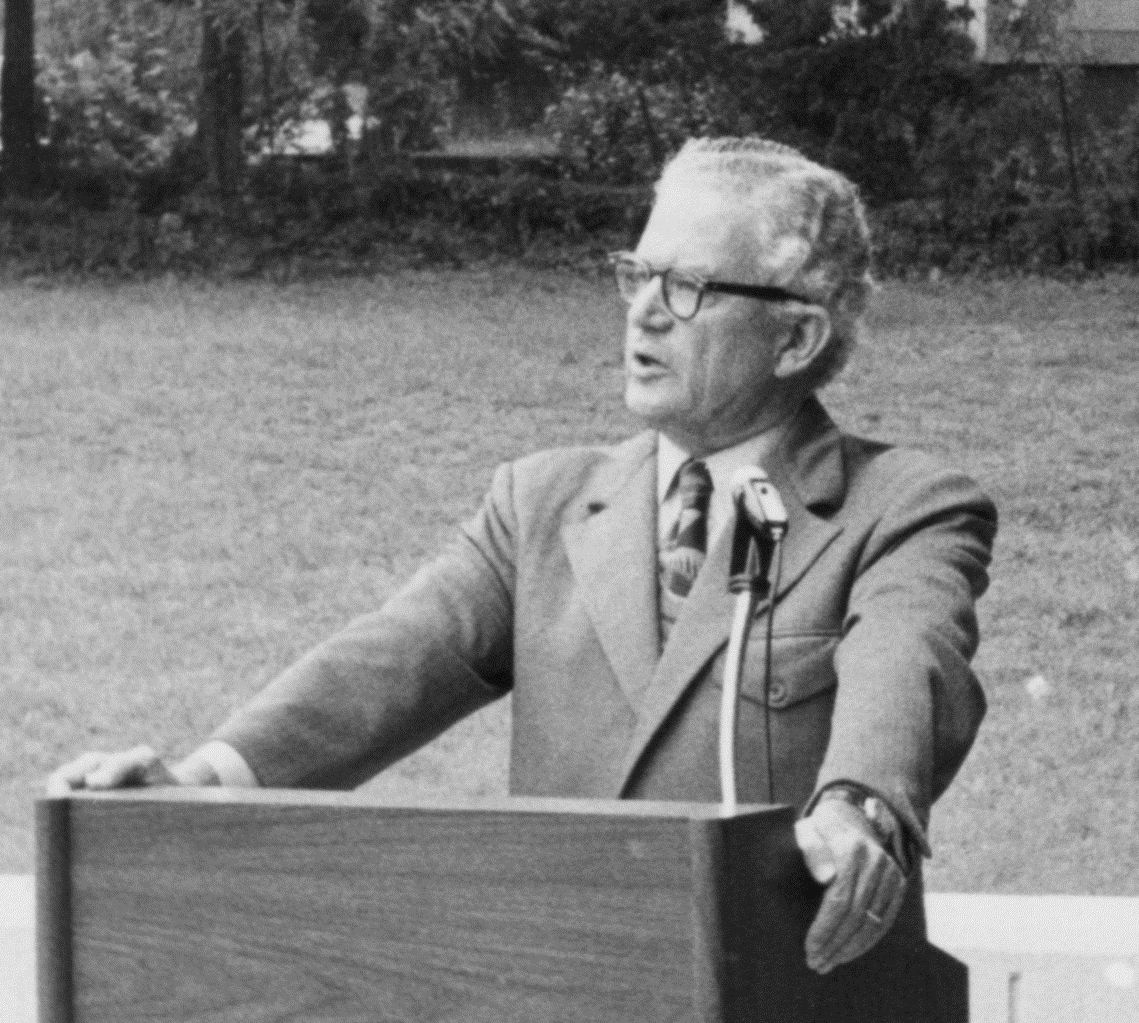
James E. Boyd speaking at Georgia Tech

In a little under a month after Boyd had assumed the vice chancellorship, then-Georgia Tech president Arthur G. Hansen resigned. Chancellor George L. Simpson appointed Boyd as Acting President of the Georgia Institute of Technology, a post he held from May 1971 to March 1972.

=== Engineering Experiment Station ===
Simpson's selection of Boyd as interim president was influenced by Boyd's previous experience as an academic administrator, his experience as director of the Engineering Experiment Station, and Boyd's ongoing position on the station's board of directors. The chancellor hoped this combination would help resolve a brewing controversy over whether the Engineering Experiment Station should be integrated into Georgia Tech's academic units to improve both entities' competitiveness for federal money. The station had sizable and growing support from the state of Georgia and its Industrial Development Council, which developed products and methods and provided technical assistance for Georgia industry. However, due in part to efforts made by Boyd and previous station director Gerald Rosselot, the station increasingly relied on electronics research funding from the federal government. In 1971, funding to both Georgia Tech's academic units and the Experiment Station began to suffer due to a combination of a sharp decline in state funds and cuts to federal science, research, and education funding after the end of the Space Race funding boom. Similar institutions, such as the Battelle Memorial Institute, Stanford Research Institute, and the Illinois Institute of Technology Research Institute had weathered this storm by becoming exceedingly good at obtaining research contracts.

Boyd's predecessor Arthur G. Hansen's "bold and controversial" solution to both entities' problems was to completely integrate the station into Georgia Tech's academic units. On paper, this would dramatically increase Georgia Tech's stated research funding (as all of it would be performed through the academic units), and it would increase options and financial aid for graduate students. Another, less publicized, reason was that Georgia Tech would gain access to the contract organization's reserve fund, (Note: The Engineering Experiment Station was renamed the Georgia Tech Research Institute in 1984. A separate organization, originally called the Industrial Development Council, changed its name to the Georgia Tech Research Institute in February 1946, and finally to the Georgia Tech Research Corporation in 1984. There are legal difficulties when an American university wishes to accept contracts from some entities, especially the federal government, so the second organization is a contracting organization. Most importantly, it allows the university to perform multi-year contracts that are not possible under state law, which requires that money received must be spent in the same fiscal year.) which was said to be over $1 million (equivalent to $8.3 million in 2025). Thomas E. Stelson, Dean of the College of Engineering at Georgia Tech, was named to "reorganize" the station. Publicly, Stelson's task was simply to recommend a plan for reorganization, but the administration clearly intended for Georgia Tech and the Engineering Experiment Station to be closely integrated. Maurice W. Long, who was director of the station at the time, viewed the move as a violation of the EES's charter as legislatively established by the Georgia General Assembly in 1919, and asserted that Georgia Tech did not have the authority to merge the two institutions. EES employees and business executives involved with the station appealed to the Georgia Board of Regents and to Governor of Georgia (and future United States President) Jimmy Carter (himself a Georgia Tech alumnus); the controversy received coverage in both The Technique and the Atlanta Constitution.

This was the climate into which Boyd entered as interim institute president after Hansen had announced, on April 27, 1971, that he would be departing Georgia Tech to become president of Purdue University on July 1 of that year. Boyd stopped the plan for absolute absorption of the station, but did allow plans for closer control and more aggressive contract solicitation to proceed. Among these measures were increased resource-sharing, including increased sharing of physical assets and research staff. The latter was evidenced by the increase in joint faculty appointments between the EES and Georgia Tech. The move paid off, and the fiscal year 1970–1971 saw EES win new contracts and grants, totaling a record $5.2 million (equivalent to $41.3 million in 2025).

=== Athletic Association ===
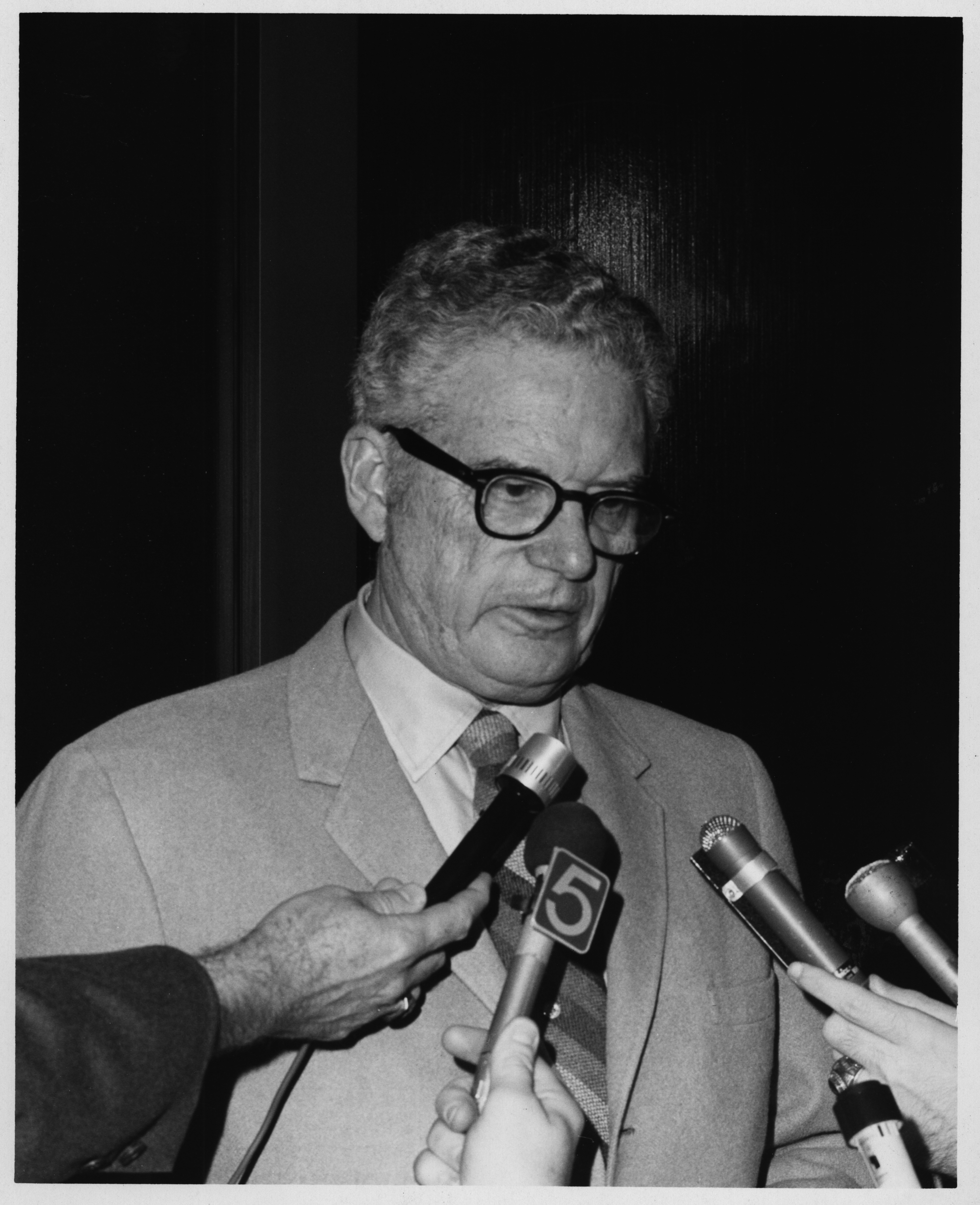
James E. Boyd speaking to the media

Boyd had to deal with intense public pressure to fire the then Georgia Tech Yellow Jackets football coach, Bud Carson. Georgia Tech alumni – accustomed to success under football legends John Heisman (whose career wins–losses–draws statistics were 185–70–17), William A. Alexander (134–95–15) and Bobby Dodd (165–64–8) – made repeated calls for Carson's dismissal. The complaints were based on a long list of infractions, including "mistreating and humiliating students" and "unsportsmanlike conduct", but the most important issue was his 27–27 record. The last straw was his 6–6 season in 1971, which included both a loss to Georgia Tech's longtime rival, the Georgia Bulldogs, and to the Mississippi State Bulldogs in the 1971 Peach Bowl. As institute president, Boyd chaired the board of directors of the Georgia Tech Athletic Association, which had been suffering both in win percentage and in finances.

Traditional sources of Athletic Association income, primarily ticket sales, had declined as a result of both the Yellow Jackets' poor record and the relatively recent establishment of professional football in Atlanta, namely the Atlanta Falcons. Bobby Dodd, then athletic director, had warned for years that Georgia Tech's rising academic standards and its limited curriculum would affect the athletic program. At a meeting on January 8, 1972, the Athletic Association board, led by Boyd, ignored a 42-page list of "charges" drafted by an alumnus, but nevertheless voted to not renew Carson's contract, making him the first Georgia Tech coach to be fired. The board also voted to not accept Bobby Dodd's resignation, which had been offered at the meeting. Carson went on to have a successful career, particularly with the Pittsburgh Steelers. On January 21, 1972, Boyd announced that Bill Fulcher had been selected as the new football head coach. This would not change the Georgia Tech Athletic Association's fortunes, however; after Carson's departure, the on-field and financial problems remained.

== Retirement and legacy ==
Joseph M. Pettit was selected as the next president of Georgia Tech in March 1972, after which Boyd returned to his position as vice chancellor for academic development for the University System of Georgia. Boyd retired from professional life in 1974. Upon retirement, he was named an honorary member of Georgia Tech's ANAK Society.

In 1997, the Georgia Board of Regents approved the naming and dedication of the math and physics building at the University of West Georgia as the "James E. Boyd Building". Two scholarships were created in his honor at the University of West Georgia; one for the top geology student, and one for a graduate of Bremen High School. Boyd died at the age of 91 on February 18, 1998, at his home in Carrollton, Georgia. The funeral was on February 20, 1998, at St. Margaret's Episcopal Church in Carrollton, and he was interred at Carrollton City Cemetery.

== See also ==
- History of the Georgia Tech Research Institute
- History of Georgia Tech

== Works cited ==
- McMath, Robert C.; Ronald H. Bayor; James E. Brittain; Lawrence Foster; August W. Giebelhaus; Germaine M. Reed (1985). Engineering the New South: Georgia Tech 1885–1985. University of Georgia Press. ISBN 978-0-8203-0784-8.
- Stevenson, Jim (January 27, 2005). "James E. Boyd" (PDF). Deceased Georgia Tech Faculty Members. Georgia Tech Library. Archived from the original (PDF) on September 12, 2006.
