= Glen P. Robinson =

American Founder of Scientific Atlanta

Glen P. Robinson, Jr.
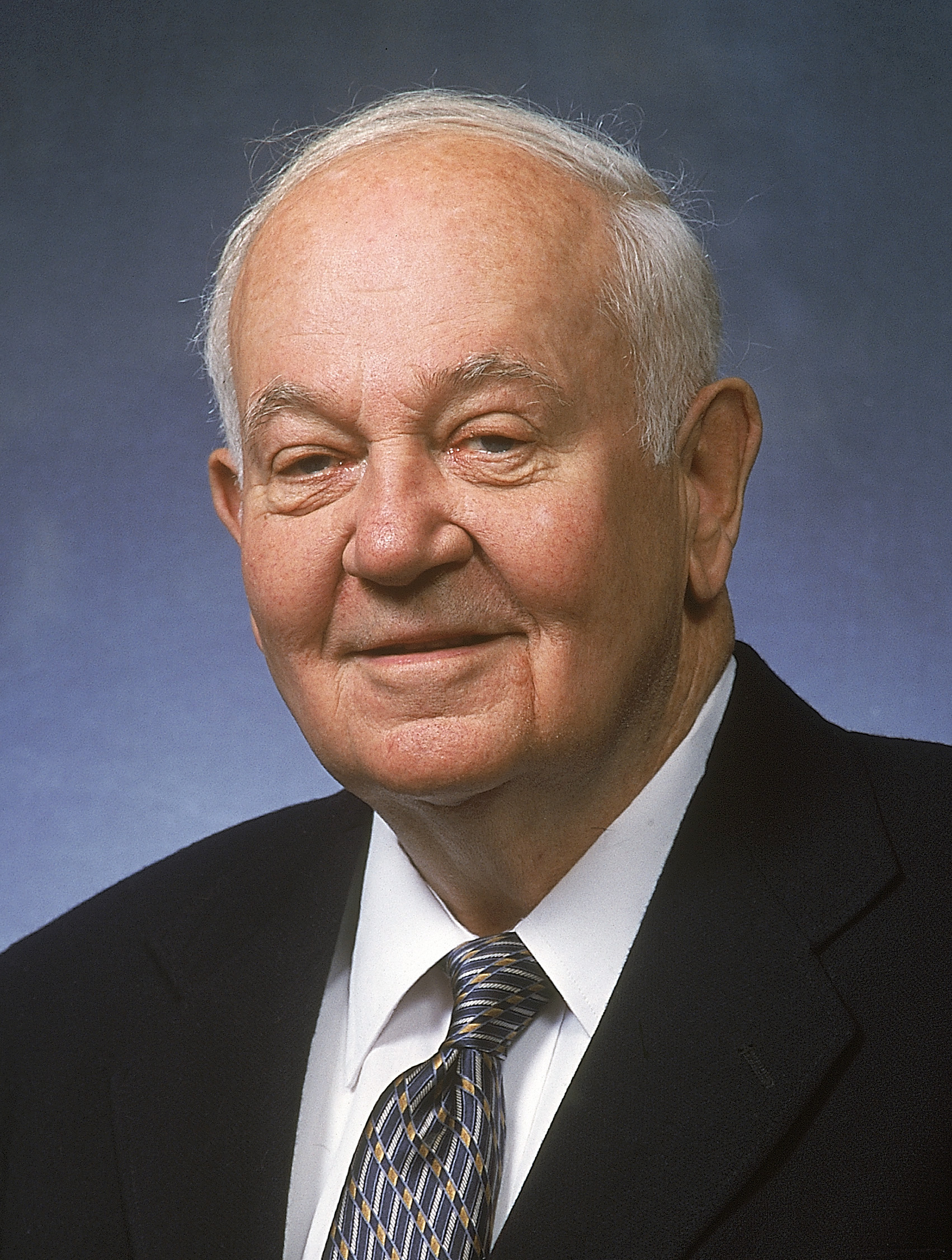
- Born: Glen Parmelee Robinson, Jr. September 10, 1923; Crescent City, Florida, U.S.
- Died: January 16, 2013 (aged 89); Atlanta, Georgia, U.S.
- Education: Georgia Institute of Technology (1948, 1950)
- Known for: Co-founding Scientific Atlanta
- Awards: Georgia's Small Businessman of the Year (1965), Georgia Business and Industry Association's Entrepreneur of the Year (1981), Georgia Technology Hall of Fame (1993), IEEE Fellow
- Scientific career
- Fields: Physics
- Workplaces: Georgia Tech Research Institute, Scientific Atlanta, AirExcel, LaserCraft, and C2 Biofuels

Glen Parmelee Robinson Jr. (September 10, 1923 – January 16, 2013), called the "father of high-tech industry in Georgia", was an American businessman and founder of Scientific Atlanta, formerly a subsidiary of Cisco Systems. Robinson was the first employee of Scientific Atlanta, where he remained CEO then Chairman of the company until he retired.

Initially a ham radio enthusiast and subsequently a graduate of the Georgia Institute of Technology (Georgia Tech) with both bachelor's and master's degrees in physics, Robinson worked at the Georgia Tech Research Institute and the Oak Ridge National Laboratory before founding Scientific Atlanta. Later in life, he founded and invested in numerous Atlanta-based science-related companies. Robinson was named an IEEE Fellow and held at least 39 patents in fields including solar energy devices and antenna systems.

For his contributions, he was named Georgia's Small Businessman of the Year in 1965, the Georgia Business and Industry Association's Entrepreneur of the Year in 1981, and was elected to the Georgia Technology Hall of Fame in 1993. In 2003, Georgia Tech awarded him an honorary Ph.D. in Physics, and in 2007, half of Georgia Tech's Molecular Science and Engineering Building was named the Glen P. Robinson, Jr. Tower in his honor.

== Early life and education ==
Robinson was born on September 10, 1923, in Crescent City, Florida, an outskirt of Jacksonville, to Glen Parmelee and Laura Mae (Lewis) Robinson. His family moved to Valdosta, Georgia, in 1937. After attending high school at Marion Military Institute in Alabama, Robinson opened a small machine shop in Valdosta. He sold industrial products and metal tools to local industry. In 1942, with the encouragement of his father, Robinson enrolled as a student at the Georgia Institute of Technology to study chemical engineering. However, his education was interrupted by his enlistment into the Naval Signal Corps and service in the Pacific Theatre of World War II where he installed telephones on recaptured American possessions during the war.

Robinson returned from the conflict as a junior and in 1948 he changed his major to physics, as the School of Physics started its degree program that year. He received a Bachelor of Science in Physics in 1948, and a Master of Science in Physics (also from Georgia Tech) in 1950. Robinson was also a member of Georgia Tech's prestigious secret society, ANAK. Robinson had been a ham radio operator enthusiast since the age of 14, and started a radio repair service to provide additional income while he was a student at Georgia Tech.

One of Robinson's professors, James E. Boyd, convinced him to give up the radio repair business and work as a research assistant at the Georgia Tech Research Institute (then known as the Engineering Experiment Station, or EES). One of his ham radio friends was actually his boss's boss and EES director, Gerald Rosselot. Working after hours at EES, Robinson built a television set in the lab, which he and others claim was the first to be built in the state of Georgia. In 1950, Robinson went to Tennessee to work in nuclear engineering for Oak Ridge National Laboratory, servicing radiology-related equipment at local hospitals.

== Scientific Atlanta ==
Robinson and six other Georgia Tech researchers (including Robinson's former professor James E. Boyd and EES director Gerald Rosselot) each contributed $100 (for a total of $700) and founded Scientific Associates on October 31, 1951, with the initial goal of marketing antenna structures being developed by the radar branch of the EES to the U.S. military. Robinson worked as the unpaid general manager for the first year. The relations between Scientific Associates and the EES were initially strained due to an unrelated dispute over station finances between EES director Gerald Rosselot and Georgia Tech vice president Cherry Emerson. Specifically, Emerson believed that surplus funds realized through research contracts should be returned to Georgia Tech, while the Georgia Tech Research Corporation and Rosselot felt they should be retained to foster additional research.

A strict conflict of interest policy was enacted, and researchers were forced to choose between the two entities; the initial investors had all kept their faculty jobs, and most returned to them. After the fledgling company's first contract resulted in a $4,000 loss, Robinson bought out all but one of the original investors and paid them each back their original $100. Robinson left EES and became president and CEO of the new company, which was renamed Scientific Atlanta. Boyd stayed on as a member of the board of directors; Robinson's friend Larry Clayton, previously involved in Robinson's radio business and now having graduated from Georgia Tech with a degree in physics, became the head of the new company's research and development. Years later, the school would promote Scientific Atlanta's origins at Georgia Tech, and Scientific Atlanta has been a longtime financial contributor to Georgia Tech.

Scientific Atlanta's first business focus was antennas for military and industrial use. Finances were tight at the fledgling firm. Signal Corps order in 1954 to develop a new plastic lens antenna prompted a need for a recorder to test the patterns of the more sophisticated antenna, but the cheapest recorder cost $10,000. When they could not afford an automatic antenna pattern recorder, of which there was only one such machine on the market, Robinson decided to build his own. When word in the industry spread companies began contacting Scientific Atlanta. Within six months of the development of the device, Robinson sold units to Western Electric, Westinghouse Electric Corporation, General Electric, Convair, American Machine and Foundry, and many other large corporations of the era. The success attracted venture capital from Rockefeller Bros., Inc., put up at Laurance Rockefeller's recommendation. Within eight years of operating, the firm had captured 60% of the global market share of electronic instruments for testing and designing antennas, had broken ground on a 25-acre facility in Northeast Atlanta, and had 240 employees on the payroll including 40 engineers.

Scientific Atlanta helped NASA establish ground stations for communication with astronauts during the Mercury, Gemini and Apollo projects. When John Glenn became the first American to orbit the Earth in 1962 on Mercury-Atlas 6, his voice was transmitted and received by radio antennas designed and equipment built by Scientific Atlanta. In the 1970s, Robinson recognized the potential combination of communications satellites and cable television. Ted Turner purchased one of Scientific Atlanta's first satellite systems, which formed the basis of Turner's "Super Station" that was broadcast around the country to other cable providers. In 1975, HBO and TelePrompTer used Scientific Atlanta equipment to transmit the first live satellite-delivered cable event, the "Thrilla in Manila" heavyweight boxing championship bout between Muhammad Ali and Joe Frazier. Scientific Atlanta is perhaps best known for pioneering television cable set-top boxes and equipment worldwide and the development of satellite Earth stations.

Robinson remained CEO of Scientific Atlanta for 20 years, and chairman of the board for an additional eight years, until he retired from the company in 1979. Scientific Atlanta grew dramatically; it earned $3.1 million in revenue in 1962, approximately $200 million in 1979, and $1.9 billion in yearly revenue by 2005. Scientific Atlanta served as a regional business incubator, with hundreds of companies tracing their roots back to it.

== Later career ==
Robinson founded E-Tech in 1978, which developed heat pump technology and high-technology related to energy conservation, energy conversion, and solar energy. When interviewed about E-Tech's founding, Robinson said "I like to pioneer new fields, to start small businesses." E-Tech acquired Scientific Atlanta's Special Products Division, which included staff, research contracts, patented products in solar energy, and specialized equipment. Its first product was an electric heat pump water heater, the Efficiency II, that reduced water heating bills by 50% and provided an equipment payback of three years. E-Tech worked on a range of United States Department of Energy contracts in the field of solar energy. In 1986, E-Tech merged with Crispaire Corporation, which specialized in cooling equipment for telecommunications systems, school classrooms, and commercial/industrial structures. The merger resulted in Robinson taking over the new entity, which also operated under the trade name Marvair. Crispaire Corporation/Marvair later joined with RV Products to form a new company, Airxcel, Inc. Robinson retired from this venture in 1997.

In 1994, Robinson funded and co-founded LaserCraft, which focused on applications of LIDAR such as radar guns and traffic enforcement cameras, and in 2006 was the world's largest manufacturer of laser products for law enforcement. LaserCraft was acquired by Public Safety Equipment in June 2006, which was in turn acquired by Stirling Square Capital Partners and Diamond Castle Holdings in February 2007.

Robinson was an angel investor, particularly in the fields of digital communications and biotechnology. In 1999, he funded OmniMetrix and Mission Communications, two companies focused on AMPS cellular digital control channel and wireless SCADA communications. Omnimetrix was acquired by Acorn Energy in 2012. Mission is currently the leading provider of cellular SCADA for water and wastewater in North America. In 2000, he invested $1.5 million in Genomic Solutions Inc, which was acquired by Digilab, Inc. in 2007. Most recently, Robinson was an investor in and co-founder of the 2007 VentureLab startup, C2 Biofuels, which attracted additional funding from Chevron and aims to build several $100 million cellulosic ethanol plants throughout the United States.

== Legacy ==
Robinson held positions on numerous boards, including: Chairman of the Georgia Science and Technology Commission; Chairman of the Georgia Tech Research Corporation; Trustee of The Georgia Tech Foundation; Member of the Board of Visitors of Emory University; Director of the Atlanta Chamber of Commerce; Director of the Georgia Tech Alumni Association, advisory board of the Georgia Institute of Technology College of Engineering, board member of Georgia State's School of Business, and director of the Georgia Business and Industry Association.

Robinson was a member of the Defense Science Board, an advisory committee of the United States Department of Defense on scientific and technical matters. He was a presenting member of the White House Conference on the Industrial World Ahead, a meeting of the nation's top business leaders to discuss technological advancement, social change, manpower utilization, Cold War competition and the state of American enterprise. Arranged by Richard Nixon and Secretary of Commerce Maurice Stans, it was the first such meeting ever held that focused solely on American business and the future. Robinson was elected an IEEE Fellow in 1977 and given the award of Outstanding Engineer of Region III by IEEE in 1978.

Robinson was selected as Georgia's Small Businessman of the Year in 1965, the Georgia Business and Industry Association's (now the Georgia Chamber of Commerce) Entrepreneur of the Year in 1981, and was elected to the Georgia Technology Hall of Fame in 1993. Since 1995, Scientific Atlanta has sponsored scholarships in Robinson's name for children of its employees. In March 1998, Robinson donated to create two endowed chairs at Georgia Tech: the $1.5 million Glen P. Robinson Chair in Non-Linear Science (in the School of Physics), currently held by Predrag Cvitanović, and the $1.5 million Glen P. Robinson Chair in Electro-Optics (in GTRI).

In 2003, Georgia Tech awarded him an honorary Ph.D. in physics, and in 2006 he was awarded the Joseph Mayo Pettit Alumni Distinguished Service Award. In 2007, half of Georgia Tech's Molecular Science and Engineering Building was named the Glen P. Robinson, Jr. Tower in his honor, due in part to his $5 million donation towards its construction.

Robinson continued working with startups and technology businesses throughout his later career. Near the end of his life, he and his wife, Jan Musgrove Robinson, had 5 children, 12 grandchildren, and 3 great-grandchildren and lived in Atlanta. On Wednesday, January 16, 2013, Robinson died of apparent heart failure. The funeral was held at St. Anne's Episcopal Church in Atlanta, and he was cremated by H.M. Patterson & Son, Arlington Chapel.
