= Maurice W. Long =

American physicist (1925–2023)

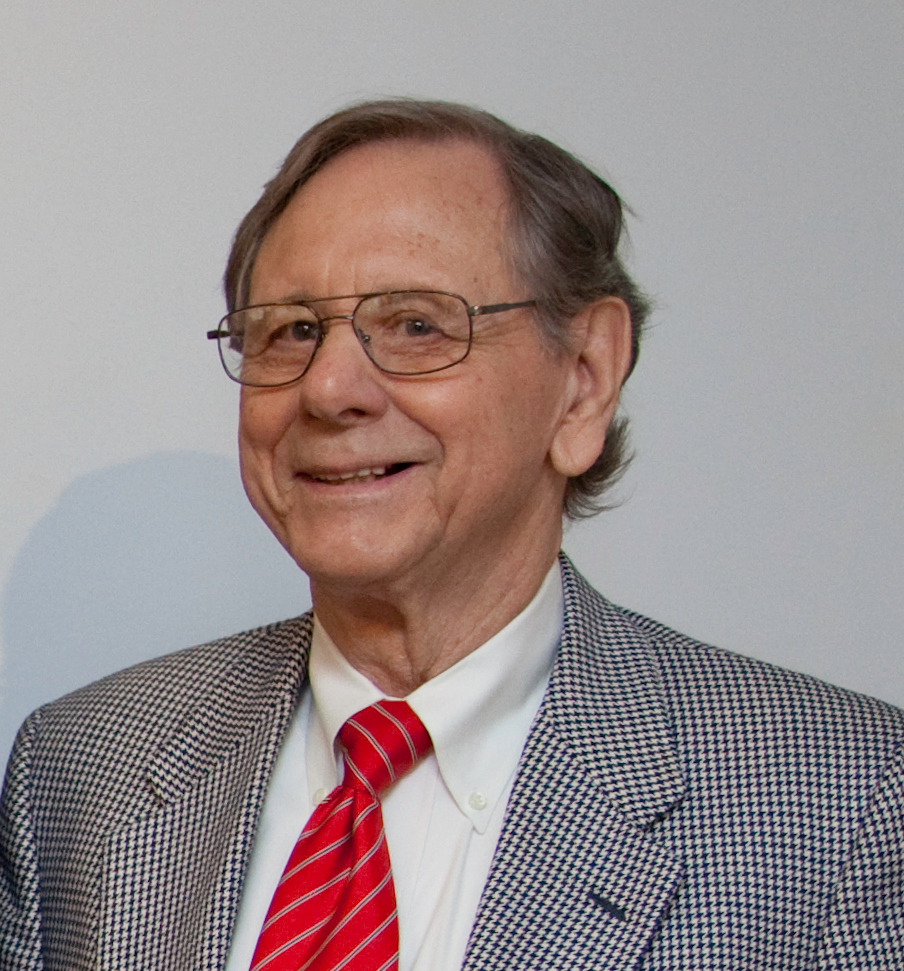
- Born: April 20, 1925; Madisonville, Kentucky, U.S.
- Died: October 14, 2023 (aged 98)
- Education: Georgia Institute of Technology; University of Kentucky
- Spouse: Beverly Long (m. 1963)
- Scientific career
- Fields: Electrical Engineering; Physics
- Workplaces: Georgia Institute of Technology; Georgia Tech Research Institute; Southern Polytechnic State University

Maurice W. Long (April 20, 1925 – October 14, 2023) was an American electrical engineer, radar engineer, and physicist. He served as director of the Georgia Tech Research Institute from 1968 to 1975. He worked as a part-time radar consultant, principal research engineer at GTRI and adjunct professor of electrical engineering at Southern Polytechnic State University.

== Education ==
Long received a Bachelor of Science in electrical engineering from the Georgia Institute of Technology in 1946. He also received a Master of Science in physics and a PhD from Georgia Tech, and a Master of Science in electrical engineering from the University of Kentucky.

== Career ==
Long began his career at the Engineering Experiment Station (now known as the Georgia Tech Research Institute) in 1946 as he completed his bachelor's degree in electrical engineering at Georgia Tech. By 1963, he was serving as the chief of the Electronics Division of the Engineering Experiment Station. Long succeeded Wyatt Whitley as director of the Engineering Experiment Station in 1968 and was also given the title of associate dean for research as part of institute president Edwin D. Harrison's attempts to bring the academic departments and the station closer together. In 1970, institute president Arthur Hansen moved to absorb the station entirely into the institute. Long resisted this move, feeling that it would compromise the effectiveness of the station. The complete integration of the Engineering Experiment Station and the institute's academic units never occurred, in part due to Long's outspokenness on the issue and in part due to James E. Boyd's selection as interim president upon Hansen's resignation in 1971.

During Long's tenure as director, the Engineering Experiment station set a new record of $5.2 million in grants and contracts in fiscal year 1970–71 in spite of an economic recession and government budget cuts. In July 1971, the station lost half of its state funding, resulting in layoffs of a large number of research personnel and the reorganization of the station to make it more financially independent by shifting its focus toward soliciting revenue-generating contracts. Long's annual report of 1972-73 reflected this change, where he defined the station as "a client-oriented research center supported primarily by Federal and industrial grants." The shift in funding led the station toward more environmentally-related research and the development of alternative energy sources.

Long retired as director of the Engineering Experiment Station in 1975, but continued to serve as a consultant. He also worked as a private radar consultant, most notably serving as a liaison scientist with the U.S. Office of Naval Research in London, England. He has written and edited several books on radar systems including Radar Reflectivity of Land and Sea and Airborne Early Warning System Concepts.

== Personal life and death ==
Long married Beverly Benson in 1963, the couple had two children together.

Long died on October 14, 2023, aged 98.
