= White House Conference on the Industrial World Ahead =

The White House Conference on the Industrial World Ahead was the first White House conference "exclusively concerned with American business and the first one on the future." The conference was called by President Richard Nixon and jointly chaired by Secretary of Commerce Maurice H. Stans and Secretary of Labor James D. Hodgson. Taking place February 7–9, 1972, in Washington D.C., its stated purpose was to bring together key business, labor, university, and government leaders "with an interest in our industrial society to take a long-range look and develop policies that will help shape the future." The conference themes were the social responsibility of business, technology and resources for business, the human side of enterprise, the structure of the private enterprise system, and business and the world economy of 1990.

The conference included presentations from scientists, futurists, Chairmen/CEOs of large multinationals, and academics. One address included a provocative statement that set the tone for the event: "several clues indicate that the industrialized world may be experiencing the beginning of a socioculturai revolution as profound and pervasive in its effects on all segments of the society as the Industrial Revolution, the Reformation, or the Fall of Rome." It was at this conference that Carl Gerstacker, Chairman of Dow Chemical, described his vision of the "anational" corporation when he said "we appear to be moving strongly in the direction of what will not be really multinational or international companies as we know them today...but what we might call 'anational' companies — companies without any nationality, belonging to all nationalities." He further stated, "I have long dreamed of buying an island owned by no nation, and of establishing the world headquarters of the Dow company on the truly neutral ground of such an island, beholden to no nation or society.”

James P. McFarland, Chairman of General Mills, said "the corporation of 1990 would have an employer‐employee relationship with its personnel that is dramatically different from that of today (1972)." He offered several examples of change: "a substantive reduction in the retirement age, but with full benefits; rapid development of corporately sponsored day‐care centers for employees’ children, and a great increase in programs that give employees lengthy paid leaves of absence to pursue interests in fields not related to business." Treasury Secretary John B. Connally "inveighed against complacency, sloth, greed, the expectancy that Government alone can cure the nation's ills, and especially against the idea that zero net economic growth might be a means to save society and protect the environment."

Perhaps the most accurate prediction was made by Roy Ash, co-founder and president of Litton Industries, during a spirited discussion with Peter G. Peterson, Robert Roosa and Roberto Campos. He proclaimed, "state capitalism may well be a form for world business in the world ahead; that the western countries are trending toward a more unified and controlled economy, having a greater effect on all business; and that the communist nations are moving more and more toward a free market system." He then posed the question of whether "East and West would meet some place toward the middle in about 1990," which was a prescient query that accurately forecasted the timing of the rise of a free-market among former communist states. During a dinner with President Nixon, the president urged the business leaders "to roll up your sleeves and increase productivity" so that their companies would be more competitive in world markets.

== Presenting members ==
- Roger Ahlbrandt, president of Allegheny Ludlum Steel
- Joseph H. Allen, president of McGraw-Hill
- Roy Ash, cofounder of Litton Industries
- William O. Baker, president of Bell Labs, advisor to five Presidents on scientific matters
- William M. Batten, chairman of J. C. Penney
- Thomas W. Benham, president Opinion Research Corporation
- Lee Bickmore, chairman of Nabisco
- Cleo W. Blackburn, president of Board for Fundamental Education
- Wernher von Braun, aerospace engineer and space architect credited with inventing the V-2 rocket
- Charles M. Brooks, head of industrial relations for Texaco, drafted Taft-Hartley
- Donald Burnham, chairman of Westinghouse Electric Corporation
- Roberto Campos, economist, writer, diplomat, politician
- Robert Charpie, chairman of Cabot Corporation
- Stewart S. Cort, chairman of Bethlehem Steel
- Frederick B. Dent, president of Mayfair Mills, Secretary of Commerce for Richard Nixon and Gerald Ford administrations.
- Richard L. Duchossois, president of Thrall Car Manufacturing Company and avid equestrian
- Mark Evans Austad Ambassador posts to Finland, Norway and vice president of Metromedia
- Joseph L. Fisher, founder of Resources for the Future
- Robben Wright Fleming, president of University of Michigan
- Carl Gerstacker, chairman of Dow Chemical
- Weldon B. Gibson, president of Stanford Research Institute, known as "Mr. SRI"
- Alan Greenspan, economist and consultant, chairman and president of Townsend-Greenspan & Company, and later Chair of the Federal Reserve
- Elisha "Bud" Grey II, chairman of Whirlpool Corporation
- Arthur G. Hansen, philanthropist and former chancellor of several universities
- Solomon Harge, director of Consumer Protection Agency
- Willis W. Harman engineer and futurist
- Harry Heltzer, chairman of 3M
- Hazel Henderson, futurist and writer
- Walter E. Hoadley, executive vice president of Bank of America
- Richard H. Holton, dean of School of Business at the University of California, Berkeley and chairman of Lyndon B. Johnson's Consumer Advisory Council
- Howard Wesley Johnson, dean of MIT Sloan School of Management, chairman of the MIT Corporation
- Herman Kahn futurist, military strategist, systems theorist, developer of U.S. nuclear strategy, founder of the Hudson Institute, and an inspiration for the Dr. Stranglove character
- Austin H. Kiplinger, president of Kiplinger
- George Kozmetsky, cofounder of Teledyne, dean of The University of Texas College of Business Administration
- William J. Kuhfuss, credited with opening world markets for U.S. farm products as president of American Farm Bureau Federation
- Henry Manne, academic, founder of the law and economics discipline
- James P. McFarland chairman of General Mills
- Dean A McGee, president of Kerr-McGee
- Robert McLellan, vice president of FMC Corporation
- Arjay Miller, president of Ford Motor Company and dean of Stanford Graduate School of Business
- Nathaniel A. Owings, architect and founding partner of Skidmore, Owings & Merrill
- Peter George Peterson, Assistant to the President for International Economic Affairs, and later a cofounder of The Blackstone Group and chairman of Council on Foreign Relations
- Jane Cahill Pfeiffer, vice president at IBM and chairwoman of NBC
- Simon Ramo, father of the intercontinental ballistic missile (ICBM), creator TRW Inc. through merger with his company, and vice chairman of TRW Inc.
- Glen P. Robinson, cofounder and chairman of Scientific Atlanta
- Robert Roosa, partner at Brown Brothers Harriman & Co., director at Council on Foreign Relations, trustee of Rockefeller Foundation, and member of Trilateral Commission
- Ralph S. Saul, chairman of First Boston, president of American Stock Exchange, and chairman of Cigna
- Mark Shepherd, chairman of Texas Instruments
- Athelstan Spilhaus, prolific inventor, boards of UNESCO and Science Service, and fellow at Woodrow Wilson International Center for Scholars
- Henry Wallich, academic, economist and central banker
- Clarence C. Walton, president of Catholic University of America
- Max Ways, board of editors at Fortune, editor of Time
- Paul Ylvisaker, academic at Princeton and Yale, dean at Harvard, chair of Lyndon B. Johnson's Task Force on Cities, and initiated the Model Cities Program
