= Daniel Goldman =

Dan Goldman (born 1976) is an American politician.

Daniel, Danny or Dan Goldman may also refer to:

- Dan Goldman (comics) (born 1974), American writer, artist and producer
- Daniel Ivan Goldman (born 1972), American experimental physicist
- Danny Goldman (1939–2020), American actor and casting director
