= Beverly Long =

Beverly Long may refer to:

- Beverly Long (activist) (1920–2015), American Civil Rights and mental health activist
- Beverly Long (actress) (1933–2014), American film and television actress
