= Rosselot =

Rosselot is a surname. Notable people with the surname include:

- Fernando Rosselot (1938–2009), Chilean politician
- Gerald Rosselot (1908–1972), American physicist and engineering executive
