= Daniel Ivan Goldman =

American physicist

- Born: Daniel Ivan Goldman; January 24, 1972 (age 54); Richmond, VA
- Education: Massachusetts Institute of Technology
- Known for: Nonlinear Dynamics Experiment
- Scientific career
- Fields: Physicist
- Workplaces: Georgia Institute of Technology
- Doctoral advisor: Harry Swinney

Daniel Ivan Goldman (born January 24, 1972) is an experimental physicist regarded for his research on the biomechanics of animal locomotion within complex materials. Goldman is currently a professor at the Georgia Institute of Technology School of Physics, where he holds a Dunn Family Professorship.

== Life ==
Goldman was born on January 24, 1972, in Richmond, Virginia, to Stanley A. Goldman and Frances T. Goldman. In September 1990 he moved to Boston, Massachusetts, to attend the Massachusetts Institute of Technology, where he received an S.B. in physics in 1994. In September 1994 he moved to Austin, Texas, and enrolled in graduate school in physics at University of Texas at Austin, where he earned a Ph.D. in 2002. He did postdoctoral work in locomotion biomechanics at the University of California at Berkeley until 2006 when he joined the faculty of Georgia Institute of Technology in 2007.

== Scientific work ==
Goldman's research integrates biological physics and nonlinear dynamics at the interface of biomechanics, robotics, and granular physics. His research addresses problems in non-equilibrium systems that involve interaction of physical and biological matter with complex materials (like granular media) that can flow when stressed. For example, how do organisms like lizards, crabs, and cockroaches generate appropriate musculoskeletal dynamics to scurry rapidly over substrates like sand, bark, leaves, and grass. The study of novel biological and physical interactions with complex media can also lead to the discovery of principles that govern the physics of the media. Goldman's research integrate laboratory and field studies of organism biomechanics with systematic laboratory studies of physics of the substrates, create models of the substrates, and create mathematical and physical (robot) models of the organisms.

== Awards ==
- Dunn Family Professorship
- Georgia Power Professor of Excellence
- Fellow of the American Physical Society (2014)
- NSF Presidential Early Career Award for Scientists and Engineers
- DARPA Young Faculty Award
- Sigma Xi Young Faculty award

== Publications ==
=== Selected academic works ===
- Maladen, R. D.; Ding, Y.; Li, Chen; Goldman, D. I. (2009). "Undulatory swimming in sand: subsurface locomotion of the sandfish lizard". Science. 325 (5938): 314–318. arXiv:2610.24934. Bibcode:2009Sci...325..314M. doi:10.1126/science.1172490. PMID 19608917. S2CID 15509585.

== See also ==
- Granular material
- Scincus scincus
