= Georgia Institute of Technology College of Sciences =

Science college in Atlanta, Georgia, US

College of Sciences
- Type: Public
- Established: 1885/1990
- Dean: Susan Lozier
- Undergraduates: 2,106
- Postgraduates: 884
- Location: Atlanta, Georgia, US
- Website: cos.gatech.edu

The College of Sciences is a college at Georgia Institute of Technology, a public research university and institute of technology in Atlanta, Georgia, United States.

== History ==
Until 1990, there was no independent college for the sciences. Before then, there had been three colleges: the College of Engineering, the College of Management, and College of Science and Liberal Studies (COSALS). As part of his restructuring plan, John Patrick Crecine reorganized the institute; he split COSALS into the College of Sciences and combined the liberal arts and management programs into the Ivan Allen College of Management and Liberal Arts. The latter would be split by G. Wayne Clough in 1998.

== Schools ==
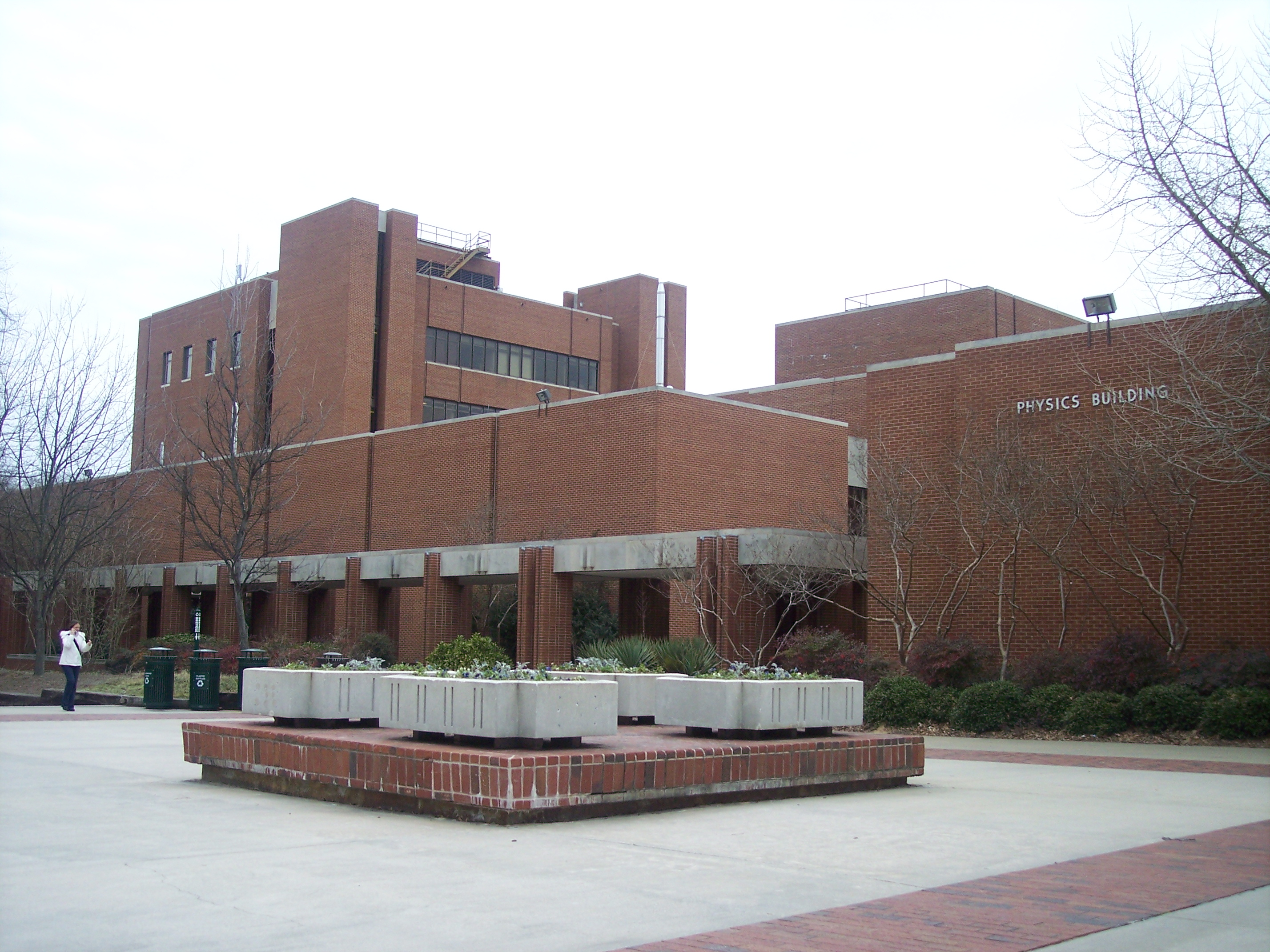
Georgia Tech's School of Physics

- School of Biological Sciences
- School of Chemistry and Biochemistry
- School of Earth and Atmospheric Sciences
- School of Mathematics
- School of Physics
- School of Psychology

== Academics ==
The college offers Bachelor of Science, Master of Science, and Doctor of Philosophy degrees.
