= Earl W. McDaniel =

American physicist

Earl Wadsworth McDaniel
- Born: April 15, 1926; Macon, Georgia
- Died: May 4, 1997 (aged 71); Atlanta, Georgia USA
- Resting place: Oakland Cemetery, Atlanta; 33.748535000 -84.372989700
- Education: Georgia Institute of Technology; University of Michigan
- Known for: Ion mobility spectrometry
- Awards: Georgia Scientist of the Year
- Scientific career
- Fields: Physics; Electrical Engineering
- Workplaces: Georgia Institute of Technology; Georgia Tech Research Institute

Earl W. (Wadsworth) McDaniel (April 15, 1926 – May 4, 1997) was a Regents Professor of Physics at the Georgia Institute of Technology and the Georgia Tech Research Institute and is most noted for his contributions to the field of ion mobility spectrometry.

== Education and early career ==
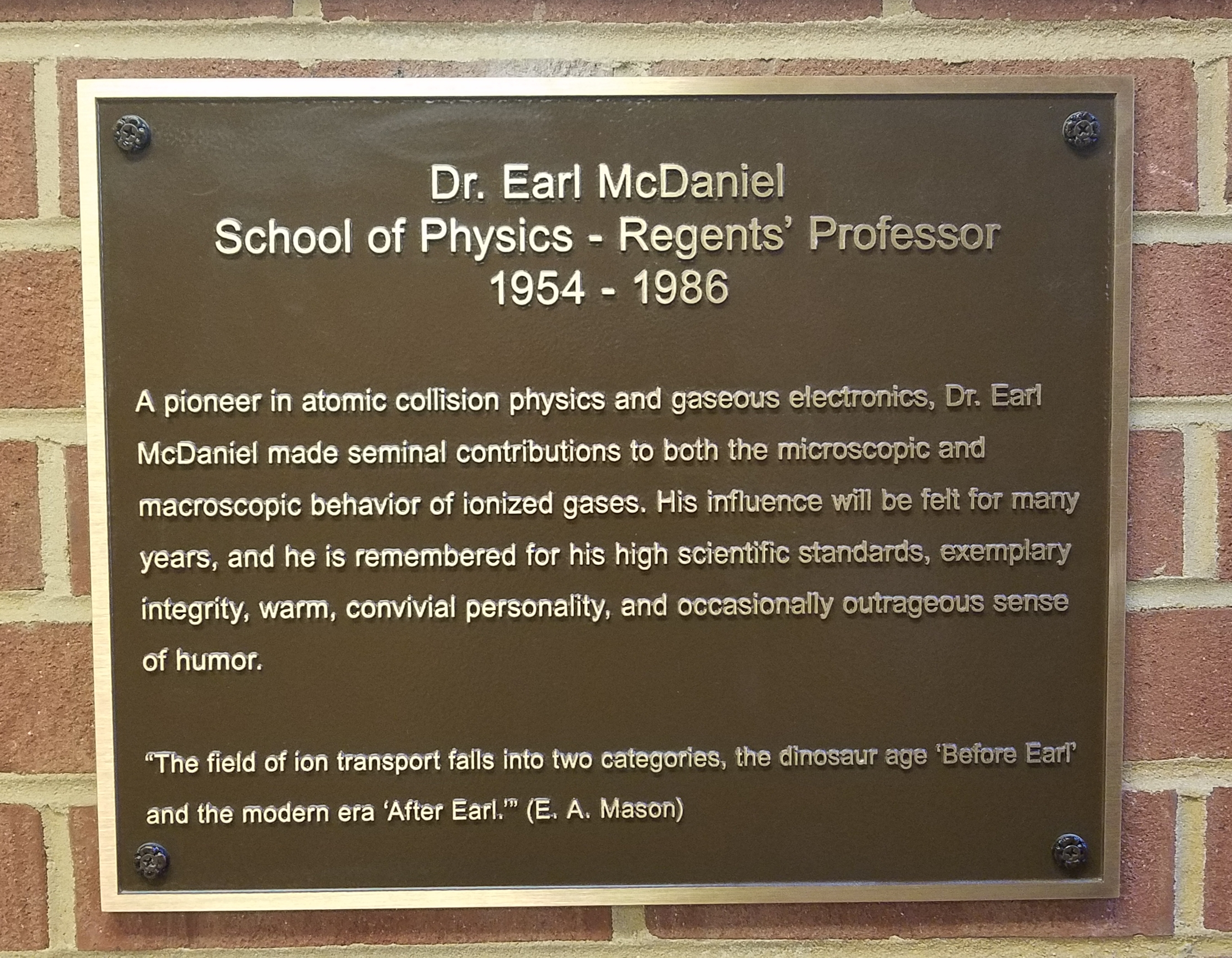
Plaque in the Howey Physics Building honoring McDaniel

After completing his undergraduate degree in physics at the Georgia Institute of Technology and earning his Ph.D. from the University of Michigan, McDaniel was recruited by Georgia Tech Research Institute director James Boyd to return to Georgia Tech as an assistant professor. He received appointments in both the School of Physics and the School of Electrical Engineering.

Apart from his work as a physicist, McDaniel was known to be an avid reader of both fiction and classics as well as an expert on the histories of great military conflicts and battles.

== Drift tube ==
In 1964, Earl began construction of a "drift tube" with the help of mechanical engineering student, Dan Albritton. Using this drift tube the pair revolutionized the field of ion transport. Their publication "Mobilities of Mass-Identified H_{3}^{+} and H^{+} Ions in Hydrogen" was chosen as one of the top 100 papers ever published in the journal Physical Review.

== Publications ==
Aside from several popular research publications, McDaniel also authored or edited 8 books. Among these, the most notable were "Collision Phenomena in Ionized Gases," “Transport Properties of Ions in Gases,” "Atomic Collisions: Electron and Photon Projectiles,” and “Atomic Collisions: Heavy Particle Projectiles.” These books were published in several countries and translated into multiple languages.
