= Robert E. Stiemke =

- Stiemke, c. 1967
- Born: March 15, 1915; Wisconsin
- Died: March 1979 (aged 63–64); Atlanta, Georgia
- Scientific career
- Fields: Civil engineering
- Workplaces: Penn State; Georgia Institute of Technology; Georgia Tech Research Institute

Robert E. Stiemke (March 15, 1915 – March 1979) was an American civil engineer, director of the Georgia Tech School of Civil Engineering from 1950 to 1962, director of the Georgia Tech Research Institute from 1961 to 1963, and Georgia Tech's first Associate Dean of Faculties and Administrator of Research after July 1, 1963.

== Early career ==
Stiemke taught at Wayne University in Detroit, North Carolina State College, and Pennsylvania State College. While at N.C. State, Stiemke was in charge of that school's engineering experiment station.

In 1950, Stiemke joined the Georgia Institute of Technology faculty as director of the School of Civil Engineering in the College of Engineering. He revived the program and was a widely-respected administrator for his accomplishments there.

== Engineering Experiment Station ==
From 1961 to 1963, Stiemke was the director of the Engineering Experiment Station (now known as the Georgia Tech Research Institute), replacing James E. Boyd. As director, Stiemke focused on continuing Boyd'd successful campaign to grow the station, although the station saw a 10 percent decrease in contracts after Boyd's departure, largely attributed to administrative problems. Stiemke also cited inadequate research space and poor institute communications as contributing factors and made efforts to ameliorate these problems.

Much of the administrative focus at this time was on the propriety of research being conducted at the Engineering Experiment Station (as opposed to within the academic units), a great source of friction between Georgia Tech's faculty and full-time researchers at the station. In an effort to resolve these issues, Stiemke attempted to bring the station closer to Georgia Tech; in particular, both closer cooperation between the station and the academic departments; and that the station's work should be more relevant to modern academic work. "Research, not only here at the Station, but in the instructional departments, should be coordinated for the greatest benefit of all."

== Administrator ==
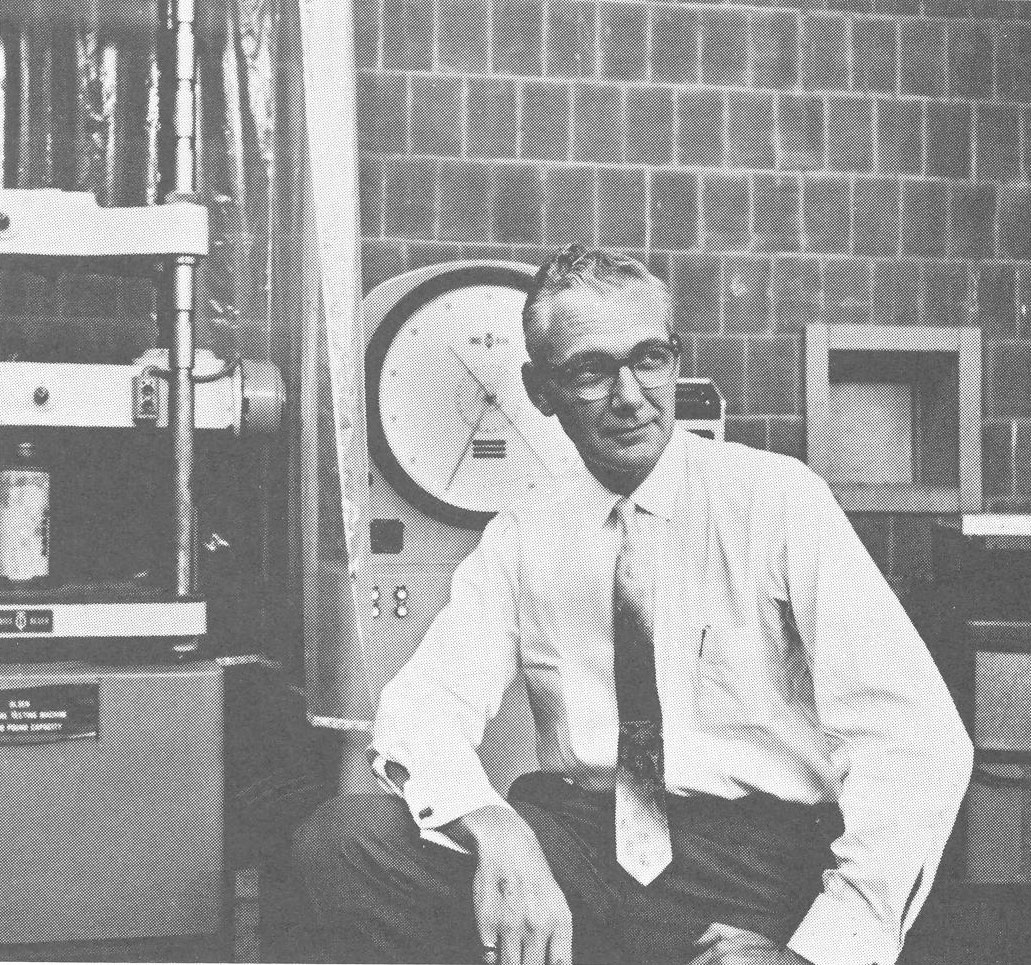
Stiemke at Georgia Tech, c. 1960s

As part of this campaign, on July 1, 1963, Stiemke proposed and was appointed to the position of Associate Dean of Faculties and Administrator of Research by Georgia Tech president Edwin D. Harrison, correlated with a decision to separate general academic research from contract research (a move popular with faculty but unpopular in the experiment station). Stiemke was later replaced as director by Wyatt C. Whitley. As a result of this and related changes, research at both the station and the academic departments saw a sharp increase.

Other administrative reorganizations would again push Stiemke into new jobs; Harrison had decided on the creation of five vice presidents, and Dr. Jesse W. Mason, Dean of the College of Engineering since 1948, was Harrison's pick for Vice Presidents for Special Projects (later known as Vice President for Programs); Mason declined the position, preferring to simply teach if he could not be Dean of Engineering. As a result, Stiemke was interim Dean of Engineering until future Georgia Tech president Arthur G. Hansen was hired as Dean of Engineering in September 1966. At that point, Stiemke became the Vice President for Programs.
