= Wyatt C. Whitley =

American chemist

- Whitley, c. 1967
- Born: October 17, 1900; Tennessee, United States
- Died: November 5, 1982 (aged 82); Atlanta, Georgia, United States
- Education: Wake Forest College; Georgia School of Technology; University of Wisconsin
- Scientific career
- Fields: Chemistry
- Workplaces: Georgia Institute of Technology; Georgia Tech Research Institute

Wyatt C. Whitley (October 17, 1900 – November 5, 1982) was an American chemist, professor of chemistry and a former director of the Engineering Experiment Station at the Georgia Institute of Technology (now known as the Georgia Tech Research Institute) from 1963 until 1968.

== Education ==
Whitley received a Bachelor of Science in Chemistry from Wake Forest College in 1929. He received a Master of Science in Chemistry from the Georgia School of Technology in 1934, and attended the University of Wisconsin for his PhD.

== Career ==
As a graduate student at Georgia Tech, Whitley began working as a chemistry instructor. After receiving his PhD at the University of Wisconsin, he returned to Georgia Tech where he was named a full professor of chemistry in 1944.

His association with the Engineering Experiment Station (now known as the Georgia Tech Research Institute) began in 1955 as chief of the chemical sciences division. He was later raised to the position of associate director and, upon the assignment of Station director Robert E. Stiemke to the post of Administrator of Research in the office of the Dean of Faculties, became the Station's director in 1963.

During his tenure as director, the level of research activity increased from $4 million to $7 million and the number of full-time staff increased by 33 percent. In 1966, the completion of the Electronics Research Building allowed a large number of the Engineering Experiment Station's research activities to come together under one roof, after being housed in more than a dozen temporary locations. Additionally, the construction of the Baker Building (currently home to the GTRI Electro-Optical Systems Laboratory) was well underway when Whitley retired in 1968.
