= Scientific Atlanta =

Defunct American company

Scientific Atlanta, Inc.
- Type: Public
- Industry: Broadband
- Founded: 1951; 75 years ago
- Founders: James E. Boyd; Charles Griffin; Robert E. Honer; Gerald Rosselot; Lamar Whittle; Vernon Widerquist; Glen P. Robinson
- Defunct: November 25, 2015
- Fate: Acquired by Cisco Systems
- Headquarters: Lawrenceville, Georgia, United States
- Key people: Tony Bates, Cisco; James F. McDonald, CEO
- Products: Set-top boxes Cable distribution Cable Modems; IPTV hardware
- Revenue: $1.9 billion (fiscal year 2005)
- Number of employees: 9,784 (as of June 5, 2007)
- Parent: Cisco Systems (2006–2015)
- Website: scientificatlanta.com

Scientific Atlanta, Inc. was a Georgia, United States-based manufacturer of cable television, telecommunications, and broadband equipment. Scientific Atlanta was founded in 1951 by a group of engineers from the Georgia Institute of Technology, and was purchased by Cisco Systems in 2005 for $6.9 billion after Cisco received antitrust clearance for the purchase. The Cisco acquisition of Scientific Atlanta was ranked in the top 10 of largest technology acquisitions in history and was Cisco's largest acquisition to date. Prior to the purchase, Scientific Atlanta had been a Fortune 500 company and was one of the top 25 largest corporations in Georgia.

Scientific Atlanta was considered by many to be "the patriarch of Atlanta's technology industry for nearly six decades" and is sometimes referred to as "Atlanta's Microsoft or Hewlett Packard".

== Products ==
Scientific Atlanta was a supplier of transmission networks for broadband access to the home, set-top cable boxes, cable modems and digital interactive subscriber systems for video, high-speed Internet, voice over IP (VoIP) networks, and worldwide customer service and support.

Products for the cable TV industry, from fiber optic network equipment for head-end media acquisition, to Explorer digital cable boxes (as well as universal remotes to go with them), and cable modems (formerly branded as WebSTAR until the Cisco acquisition in 2006), dominated Scientific Atlanta's sales. Scientific Atlanta's most popular modem was the Scientific Atlanta 2100, because it was often supplied by cable providers like Spectrum, Comcast, Time Warner Cable and Cox Communications. Scientific Atlanta also supplied distribution technology to networks such as Bloomberg Television, CNN, ESPN and many others.

In addition to providing products for traditional coaxial and fiber service operators, Scientific Atlanta also expanded its IPTV solutions offerings after the merger with Cisco. Before this, on August 18, 2005, Scientific-Atlanta and SBC (now AT&T) signed a deal for Scientific-Atlanta to be the exclusive set-top provider for SBC U-verse TV.

== History ==
Scientific Atlanta's logo after Cisco's acquisition

Founded in October 1951 by six Georgia Tech Research Institute researchers: James E. Boyd (future station director), Charles Griffin, Robert E. Honer (MSEE), Gerald Rosselot (station director), Lamar Whittle, and Vernon Widerquist, who each invested $100. In late 1952 Glen P. Robinson became the seventh member. Scientific Atlanta was started to produce technology developed at the research station. After the fledgling company's first contract resulted in a $4,000 loss, Robinson bought out all but one of the original investors, and paid them each back their original $100.

Glen P. Robinson was the CEO of Scientific Atlanta for 20 years, and chairman of the board for an additional eight years, until he retired from the company in 1979. Scientific Atlanta grew dramatically; it earned $3.1 million in revenue in 1962 and approximately $200 million when Robinson left. Sidney Topol served as its president from 1971 to 1983, CEO from 1975 to 1987, and chairman of the board from 1978 to 1990. During his tenure, the company grew in sales to more than $600 million. During the 1970s the company developed the concept of cable/satellite connection, which, in working with HBO and transportable earth stations developed by TelePrompTer Corporation and manufactured by Scientific Atlanta, established satellite-delivered television for the cable industry.

In 2000, the company sold its satellite ground station and satellite networking businesses to Viasat.

In August 2002, the company laid off 6 percent of the company's total.

In February 2003, Scientific-Atlanta introduced their first Explorer HD set-top box, which is capable of displaying HDTV programming, at Best Buy stores in the Phoenix metropolitan area. It was later rolled out nationwide. In March 2004, Scientific-Atlanta launched the Explorer 8000HD, their first set-top box with both DVR and HD.

In the set-top arena, Scientific-Atlanta once enjoyed 100% market share with Time Warner Cable, Cablevision and AT&T U-verse; all three companies have since started to transition to other boxes, Cablevision using Samsung, while TWC and U-verse are split between SA/Cisco and competitor Arris (formerly Motorola). Comcast also has a split account with the two companies. Other companies that have split accounts with SA and Arris are Suddenlink Communications, Charter Communications and Cox; the two vendors also had split accounts for Adelphia before that company went under in 2006. Pace plc, which mainly competes in foreign markets, serves as a domestic rival, but on a limited scale.

On November 18, 2005, Scientific Atlanta announced that it would be purchased by Cisco Systems in a US$6.9 billion cash deal. On February 25, 2006, Cisco Systems announced that it had completed acquisition of Scientific Atlanta in a cash deal that paid $43 per share. The total cash value of the deal was roughly US$7 billion, or US$5.1 billion net of Scientific Atlanta's cash balance, and also about US$5.1 billion over their 2005 shareholders' equity. In its fiscal year 2005, Scientific Atlanta earned $1.36 per common share (diluted).

On November 21, 2015, Cisco completed sale of its Connected Devices Business Unit (CDBU) to Technicolor SA. This business was comprised primarily by customer premises equipment (CPE) related hardware and software that had originated at Scientific Atlanta, including set top boxes, cable gateways / modems, CableCard devices, digital transport adapters, wireless video access points, network extenders, accessories and eleven software products related to these offerings.

The company was honored at the 2008 Technology & Engineering Emmy Awards for development of interactive video on demand infrastructure and signaling, leading to large scale VOD implementations.
