= Joseph Howey =

Joseph H. Howey
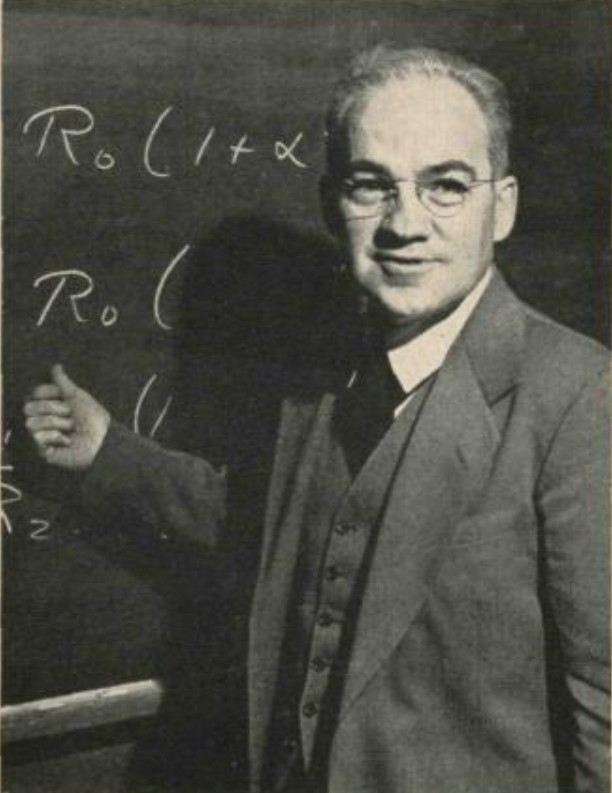
- Howey, c. 1953
- Born: September 1, 1901; Wayne County, Ohio
- Died: March 23, 1973 (aged 71); Tampa, Florida
- Citizenship: American
- Education: College of Wooster; Yale University
- Scientific career
- Workplaces: Georgia Institute of Technology

Joseph H. Howey (September 1, 1901 – March 23, 1973) was a physicist and academic administrator at the Georgia Institute of Technology. He was the director of Georgia Tech's School of Physics from 1935 to 1963.

== Early life ==
Howey received a Bachelor of Arts from the College of Wooster in 1923 and a PhD from Yale University in 1930. Howey was also a physicist in Firestone Tire and Rubber Corp's research laboratory from 1929 to 1931, after which he returned to Yale as an instructor.

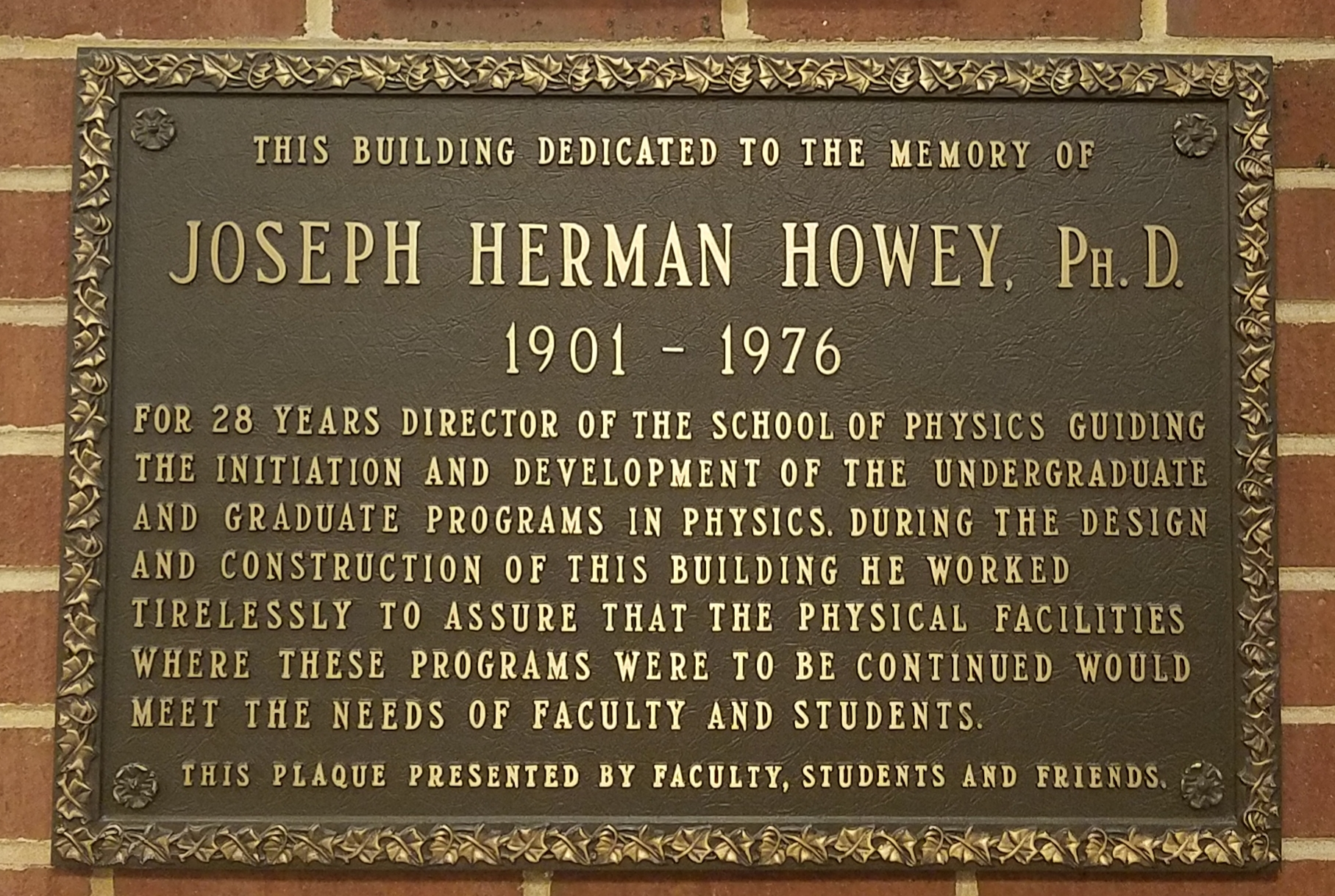
Plaque honoring Howey at Georgia Tech

== Georgia Tech ==
In 1934 Howey became a professor of physics at Georgia Tech, and in 1935 became the director of the school's physics department, where he was instrumental in establishing a standard curriculum and creating graduate and PhD programs. In 1963 Howey requested to be "associate director" so that he could focus on the design of the new physics building, and was succeeded in his post by Vernon D. Crawford.

Three years after his death, on September 17, 1976, the physics building he helped design was dedicated and named in his honor.
