= Beverly Long (activist) =

American activist from Athens, Georgia (1920–2015)

- Born: March 3, 1920; Athens, GA
- Died: October 30, 2015 (aged 95); Atlanta, GA
- Education: University of Georgia; University of North Carolina at Chapel Hill
- Occupations: Mental health and civil rights advocate
- Spouse: Maurice W. Long (m. 1963)
- Children: Theodore Douglas Downing; Beverly Patricia Downing; Anne Catherine Long Key; Elizabeth Long Rice

Beverly Benson Long (March 3, 1920 – October 30, 2015) was an American activist from Athens, Georgia. She was particularly invested in the fight to desegregate Georgia's public schools between 1958 and 1961. Later, she became an advocate for those with mental illnesses.

== Early life and education ==
Beverly Benson Long was the daughter of William Howard Benson and Charlotte Moor Benson of Athens, Georgia. She had one younger brother, Howard Edsel "Ed" Benson. Long's father founded Benson's Bakery in downtown Athens in 1918, two years before Long was born.

In 1941, Long earned a Bachelor of Science from the University of Georgia. She then received a master's in public health from the University of North Carolina at Chapel Hill in 1942 and a master's in psychology from the University of Georgia in 1959.

== Civil rights advocacy ==
In 1954, the United States Supreme Court ruled on the case Brown v. Board of Education of Topeka, Kansas and declared that all public schools in the country must desegregate. To counter this ruling, Georgia passed several laws with the intent of preserving segregation throughout the state. These laws decreed that all Georgia public schools would close if any school integrated within the state.

As an advocate for school integration, Beverly Long joined the organization Help Our Public Education Incorporated (HOPE Inc.). The purpose of HOPE Inc. was to disseminate factual information to Georgians regarding the potential closure of public schools and provide a course of action for concerned citizens who wished to keep the public school system operational. To appeal to the largest demographic of Georgians, the organization maintained a neutral stance on the issue of integration, but by advocating for the retention of the public school system HOPE Inc. implicitly supported desegregation. Other notable members of HOPE Inc. included former U.S. Attorney James Doresey, the former manager of the Atlanta chapter of the Red Cross Harry Boyte, and the former Georgia state president of the League of Women Voters Frances Pauley.

While working with Hope Inc., Long assisted with a variety of outreach projects. In 1960, she presented a petition at the Georgia Capital with over 10,000 names that called for legislation to allow public schools to remain open. Long also worked with 986 of Georgia's leading businessmen to send a telegraph to the state government advocating for new laws.

Long served as chair for the Athen's chapter of HOPE Inc. between 1958 and 1960. In 1960 she assumed the position of chair of the executive committee. She held this title until HOPE Inc. became inactive in 1961, after Georgia's segregation laws were revised to allow integration in public schools.

== Mental health advocacy ==
Throughout her life, Long served on several committees and worked with numerous organizations committed to advocating for mental health awareness on local, national, and global levels.

Within her home state of Georgia, Long served as the president of the National Mental Health Association of Atlanta between 1968 and 1969. She then took on the role of president of the National Mental Health Association of Georgia (now known as Mental Health America of Georgia) from 1973 to 1974. Between 1975 and 1978, Long served as the first chair of the Georgia Governor's Advisory Council on Mental Health, Mental Retardation, and Substance Abuse.

In 1977 Long was appointed by President Jimmy Carter, who she met during his term as the 76th Governor of Georgia, to be a member of the President's Commission on Public Health, the first presidential commission formed to address issues of mental health policy. The commission was instrumental in formulating the National Plan for the Chronically Mentally Ill that influenced governmental policy regarding Supplemental Security Income, Social Security Disability Insurance, Medicaid, and Medicare. Between 1979 and 1980 Long served as President for the National Mental Health Association. In 1984, she founded and chaired the Commission on the Prevention of Mental-Emotional Disabilities within the National Mental Health Association. In 1987, Long helped to found the National Prevention Coalition, which she chaired until 1991.

Between 1995 and 1997 Long served as the president of the World Federation for Mental Health. She also worked with the United Nations on issues related to mental health and was an active committee member of the Biennial Conference series produced by the Global Consortium for the Advancement of Promotion and Prevention.

Long also helped to create the Rosalynn Carter Endowed Chair for Mental Health at the Rollins School of Public Health at Emory University.

== Honors and awards ==
In 2007, Long received an honorary Doctor of Science from Emory University in Atlanta, GA in recognition of her advocacy for mental health. She was nominated for this honor by former First Lady Rosalynn Carter, former Carter Center President and CEO John Hardman, and the Carter Center's Mental Health Program.

== Personal life ==
Long married Maurice Wayne Long, an engineer and professor, in 1963. Together, they had two children, Anne Catherine Long Key and Elizabeth Long Rice. Long also had two children from a previous marriage, Theodore Douglas Downing and Beverly Patricia Downing.
