= Georgia Institute of Technology School of Physics =

Academic department of Georgia Tech

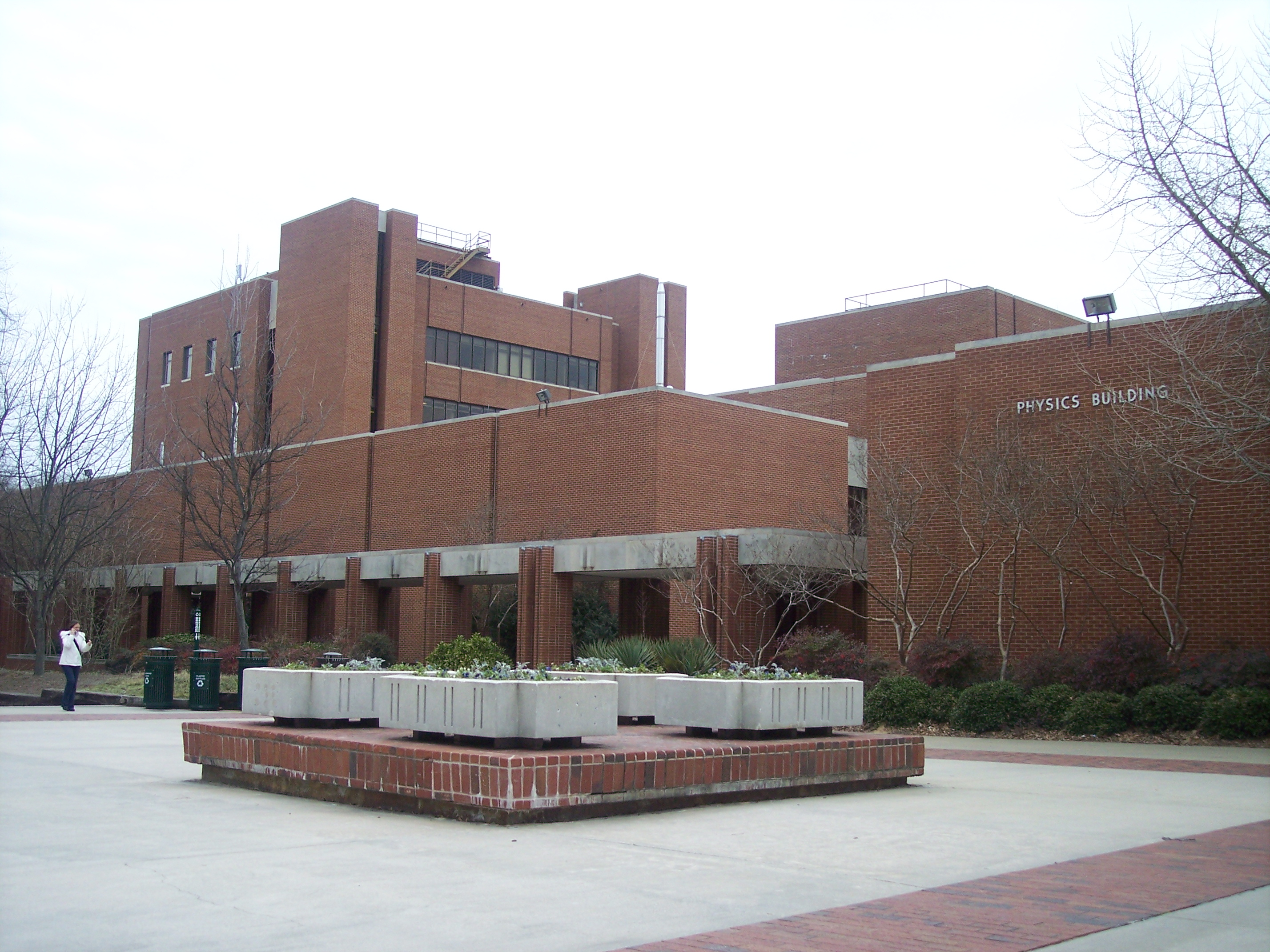
- The Joseph H. Howey physics building housing the school's administration, faculty offices, and lecture halls was dedicated in 1976.
- Type: Public
- Established: 1885
- Chair: Feryal Özel
- Faculty: 63
- Postgraduates: 109
- Location: Atlanta, Georgia, United States; 33.777412°N 84.398756°W
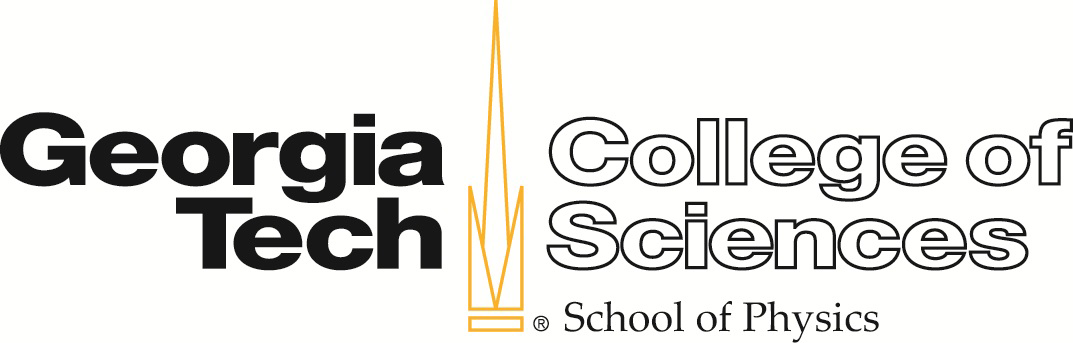

The School of Physics is an academic unit located within the College of Sciences at the Georgia Institute of Technology (Georgia Tech), Georgia, United States. It conducts research and teaching activities related to physics at the undergraduate and graduate levels. The School of Physics offers bachelor's degrees in Physics or Applied Physics. A core of technical courses gives a strong background in mathematics and the physical principles of mechanics, electricity and magnetism, thermodynamics, and quantum theory. The School of Physics also offers programs of study leading to certificates in Applied Optics; Atomic, Molecular, and Chemical Physics; and in Computer Bases Instrumentation.

== History ==
The Physics Department was one of the eight original departments created, when Georgia Tech opened in 1888. The first chair of the department was Isaac S. Hopkins, who also became Georgia Tech's first president. At the outset, Georgia Tech closely modeled itself after the Worcester "Free School" in Worcester, Massachusetts (now the Worcester Polytechnic Institute) and the Massachusetts Institute of Technology in Cambridge. The curricula of such schools emphasized primarily an amalgamation of undergraduate physics education with engineering.

In the 1920s and 1930s, the physics department, under the directorship of J. B. Edwards, was closely tied to applied research connected with public and private companies.

During the latter decades of the twentieth century, the groups specialized in applied, interdisciplinary, and pure research. The applied and interdisciplinary centers include the Center for Nonlinear Science (CNS), which consists of thirteen core members and ten associate members. In addition, the center hosts visiting faculty. There is also the Center for Relativistic Astrophysics, which consists of ten core members working on problems including gravitational waves.

The Howey-Physics Building, home to physics and calculus, was named after Joseph H. Howey. The building, which he played such an important role in designing, was dedicated and named the Joseph H. Howey physics building on September 17, 1976. Joseph Howey served as Director of the School of Physics at Georgia Tech for 28 years (1935–1963). The School of Physics's administrative offices, as well as those of most of its faculty and graduate students, are located in the Howey-Physics Building on the main campus.

In August 2022, Feryal Özel became the Chair of the School of Physics.

== Degrees offered ==
The School of Physics offers a bachelor's degree in both pure and Applied Physics plus both master's and doctoral degrees in several fields. These degrees are technically granted by the School's parent organization, the Georgia Tech College of Sciences, and often awarded in conjunction with other academic units within Georgia Tech. The graduate program was initiated under Joseph Howey's leadership and the undergraduate program grew in stature to become one of the larger departments in the United States. Howey remained at the helm of the School of Physics for 28 years.

Doctoral degree

- Ph.D. in Philosophy of physics

Master's degree

- M.S. in Physics

Bachelor's degrees

- B.S. in Physics
- B.S. in Applied Physics

== Research ==
The graduate curriculum in the School of Physics provides the background and training needed to conduct research. Completion of the Ph.D. program in Physics requires completion of course work, participation in seminars and Special Problems, acceptance into Ph.D. candidacy, and thesis research.

Every faculty member of the School of Physics earned a Ph.D. degree and completed post-doctoral research positions prior to embarking on his or her independent academic careers. In addition, each member of the faculty teaches at both the undergraduate and graduate level. Several faculty members are involved with CETL (Georgia Tech’s Center for Enhancement of Teaching and Learning) and CEISMIC (Georgia Tech’s Center for Education Integrating Science, Mathematics and Computing). CETL offers courses that teach the graduate students how to teach. CEISMIC operates over 20 programs from K-12 students or teachers, partnering in the process with many of the Georgia public school systems and prominent educational agencies. These two centers are available to students.

== Notable faculty ==
- Feryal Özel
- Walter de Heer
- Predrag Cvitanovic
- David Finkelstein
- Paul Goldbart
- Uzi Landman
- Kurt Wiesenfeld
- Turgay Uzer
