= Gerald Rosselot =

American physicist (1908–1972)

Gerald A. Rosselot
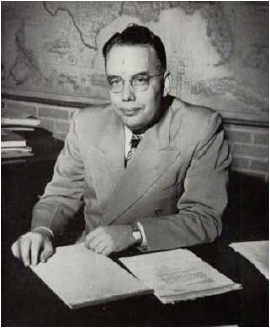
- Born: January 11, 1908; Westerville, Ohio
- Died: August 12, 1972 (aged 64)
- Education: Otterbein College; Ohio State University
- Scientific career
- Fields: Physics
- Workplaces: Georgia Tech Research Institute, Bendix

Gerald A. Rosselot (January 11, 1908 - August 12, 1972) was an American physicist and engineering executive at the Georgia Institute of Technology, the Georgia Tech Research Institute and Bendix Corporation (now owned by Honeywell). He was an IEEE Fellow.

== Early life ==
Rosselot was born January 11, 1908, in Westerville, Ohio. As a child, Rosselot traveled to France and England and became somewhat proficient in French. He attended and received a Bachelor of Arts degree from Otterbein College in 1929, a Master of Arts from Ohio State University in 1930, and a Ph.D. from Ohio State University in 1936. In 1930, he married Gladys Anna Dickey, and would eventually have five children with her.

== Georgia Tech ==
In 1934, Rosselot came to Georgia Tech. Initially an instructor in physics (1934–35 and 1936–37) and Mathematics (1935–36), he quickly ascended through Assistant Professor in Physics (1937–39) to Associate Professor of Physics (1940–41) and later Professor of Physics (1941–43). In 1950, Rosselot was selected as chairman of the Engineering College Research Council (part of the American Society for Engineering Education conference, held at the University of Washington that year).

In 1940, Rosselot was appointed by Georgia Institute of Technology president Marion L. Brittain as the assistant director of the Engineering Experiment Station (now known as the Georgia Tech Research Institute). From 1941 to 1952, Rosselot was the organization's director, replacing the recently deceased acting director Harold Bunger. In his tenure as director of Georgia Tech's Engineering Experiment Station, World War II significantly increased the number and value of contracts coming to the station, and is credited with GTRI's entry into electronics, especially telecommunications and electronic warfare. At the end of World War II, Georgia Tech had about $240,000 annually in sponsored research. Other accomplishments during Rosselot's administration at the Engineering Experiment Station included the purchase of an electron microscope in 1946 for $13,000 (equivalent to $210,000 in 2025), the first such instrument in the Southeastern United States and one of few in the United States at the time. The Research Building was expanded, and a $300,000 (equivalent to $4,000,000 in 2025) Westinghouse A-C network calculator was given to Georgia Tech by Georgia Power in 1947.

Rosselot's administration also included the 1946 establishment of the Industrial Development Council, renamed to the Georgia Tech Research Institute in 1948 and to its present name, the Georgia Tech Research Corporation, in 1984. When the Georgia Board of Regents ruled that all money received in a year had to be spent that year; this was problematic because most government contracts span multiple years. Georgia Tech president Blake Van Leer and vice president Cherry Emerson created the solution, a non-profit corporation that would manage contracts for research services and subsequently hire the Engineering Experiment Station to perform the research. The new organization would also handle patents garnered through research, and distribute funds garnered from contracts and patents as needed.

In 1951, there was a dispute over station finances and Rosselot's hand in the foundation of Scientific Atlanta against Georgia Tech vice president Cherry Emerson. When it was founded in October 1951, Rosselot was president and CEO of Scientific Atlanta; at issue was potential conflicts of interest with his role at Georgia Tech and what, if any, role Georgia Tech should have in technology transfer to the marketplace. Rosselot resigned his post at Georgia Tech in November 1952 (and was on leave until March 1953), but his participation ensured the eventual success of Scientific Atlanta and made way for further technology transfer efforts by Georgia Tech's VentureLab and the Advanced Technology Development Center.

== Bendix ==
In 1953, Rosselot joined Bendix Corporation as their Director of Engineering. He offered for Georgia Tech to match his potential salary at Bendix, but Georgia Tech president Blake Van Leer felt that such a move would be a dangerous precedent. Rosselot became Director of Scientific and University Relations for Bendix in 1955. Rosselot would later become director of Bendix's Research Laboratories Division, and later vice president. In July 1972, Rosselot retired from Bendix due to illness, and he died of acute leukemia on August 12, 1972.
