= Government procurement in the United States =

Government procurement in the United States comprises the processes of government procurement within the United States. The processes enable federal, state and local government bodies in the country to acquire goods, services (including construction), and interests in real property. Contracting with the federal government or with state and local public bodies enables interested businesses to become suppliers in these markets.

== Background ==
In the United States, the processes of government procurement enable federal, state and local government bodies in the country to acquire goods, services (including construction), and interests in real property. The market for state, local, and education (SLED) contracts is thought to be worth $1.5 trillion. Supplies are purchased from both domestic and overseas suppliers. Contracts for federal government procurement usually involve appropriated funds spent on supplies, services, and interests in real property by and for the use of the Federal Government through purchase or lease, whether the supplies, services, or interests are already in existence or must be created, developed, demonstrated, and evaluated. Federal Government contracting has the same legal elements as contracting between private parties: a lawful purpose, competent contracting parties, an offer, an acceptance that complies with the terms of the offer, mutuality of obligation, and consideration. However, federal procurement is much more heavily regulated, subject to volumes of statutes dealing with federal contracts and the federal contracting process, mostly in Titles 10 (Armed Forces), 31 (Money and Finance), 40 (Protection of the Environment), and 41 (Public Contracts) within the United States Code.

=== Value of government procurement ===
In fiscal year 2019, the US Federal Government spent $597bn on contracts. The Obama administration measured spend at over $500bn in 2008, double the spend level of 2001. Other estimates suggest spend was $442bn in fiscal year 2015 and $461bn in 2016. Federal Procurement Reports provide contract data which may be used for geographical, market, and socio-economic analysis, as well as for measuring and assessing the impact of acquisition policy and management improvements.

In fiscal year 2010, the top five departments by dollars obligated were:

- Department of Defense ($365.9 bn)
- Department of Energy ($25.7 bn)
- Health and Human Services ($19.0 bn)
- General Services Administration ($17.6 bn)
- NASA ($16.0 bn).

The Top 100 Contractors Report for Fiscal Year 2022 published by the General Services Administration lists contracts with a combined total of $398.8 billion. The top five are aerospace, defense and medical contractors:

- Lockheed Martin ($47.7 bn)
- Raytheon ($26.9 bn)
- General Dynamics ($24.7 bn)
- Pfizer ($18.0 bn)
- Boeing ($16.5 bn)

In the same period, small business contracts totalled $153.9 billion.

== Law ==
The Federal Government's authority to enter into contracts derives from the U.S. Constitution, which defines its powers. The Federal Government acts through legislation, treaties, implementing regulations, and the exercise of those authorities. The Federal Government's power to contract is not set forth expressly and specifically in the U.S. Constitution, but Article 6 appears to assume the continued vitality of "Engagements" entered into under the preceding Articles of Confederation. Moreover, the power to contract was and is regarded at law as necessarily incidental to the Federal Government's execution of its other powers. An early Supreme Court case, the United States v. Thomas Tingey, recognized that the United States Government has a right to enter into a contract. It is an incident to the general right of sovereignty, and the United States may, within the sphere of the constitutional powers confided to it and through the instrumentality of the proper department to which those powers are confided, enter into contracts not prohibited by law and appropriate to the just exercise of those powers. Scores of statutes now also expressly authorize departments and agencies to enter into contracts. The U.S. Congress passes legislation that defines the process and additional legislation that provides the funds.

State laws on procurement also operate, governing the procedures to be followed within each state.

=== Contract law ===
Private parties entering into a contract with one another (i.e., commercial contracts) have more freedom to establish a broad range of contract terms by mutual consent compared to a private party entering into a contract with the Federal Government. Each private party represents its own interests and can obligate itself in any lawful manner. Federal Government contracts allow for the creation of contract terms by mutual consent of the parties, but many areas addressed by mutual consent in commercial contracts are controlled by law in federal contracting and legally require use of prescribed provisions and clauses. In commercial contracting, where one or both parties may be represented by agents whose authority is controlled by the law of agency, the agent is usually allowed to form a contract only with reference to accepted notions of commercial reasonableness and perhaps a few unique statutes which apply. In federal government contracting, the specific regulatory authority is required for the Government's agent to enter into the contract, and that agent's bargaining authority is strictly controlled by statutes and regulations reflecting national policy choices and prudential limitations on the right of federal employees to obligate federal funds. By contrast, in commercial contracting, the law allows each side to rely on the other's authority to make a binding contract on mutually agreeable terms. Executive branch agencies enter into the contracts and expend the funds to achieve their Congressionally defined missions. When disputes arise, administrative processes within the agencies may resolve them, or the contractor can appeal to the courts.

The procurement process for executive branch agencies (as distinguished from legislative or judicial bodies) is governed primarily by the Armed Services Procurement Act and the Federal Property and Administrative Services Act. To address the many rules imposed by Congress and the courts, a body of administrative law has been developed through the Federal Acquisition Regulation. This 53-part regulation defines the procurement process, including special preference programs, and includes the specific language of many clauses mandated for inclusion within Government contracts. Most agencies also have supplemental regulatory coverage contained in what are known as FAR Supplements. These supplements appear within the Code of Federal Regulations (CFR) volumes of the respective agencies. For example, the Department of Defense (DOD) FAR Supplement can be found at 10 CFR.

Government contracts are governed by federal common law, a body of law which is separate and distinct from the bodies of law applying to most businesses—the Uniform Commercial Code (UCC) and the general law of contracts. The UCC applies to contracts for the purchase and sale of goods, and to contracts granting a security interest in property other than land. The UCC is a body of law passed by the U.S. state legislatures and is generally uniform among the states. The general law of contracts, which applies when the UCC does not, is mostly common law, and is also similar across the states, whose courts look to each other's decisions when there is no in-state precedent.

Contracts directly between the Government and its contractors ("prime contracts") are governed by federal common law. Contracts between the prime contractor and its subcontractors are governed by the contract law of the respective states. Differences between those legal frameworks can put pressure on a prime contractor.

=== United States Constitution ===
The authority to purchase is not one of the explicitly enumerated powers given to the Federal Government by Section 8 of Article One of the United States Constitution, but courts found that power implicit in the constitutional power to make laws that are necessary and proper for executing its specifically granted powers, such as the powers to establish post offices, post roads, banks, an army, a navy, or militias.

=== Statutes ===
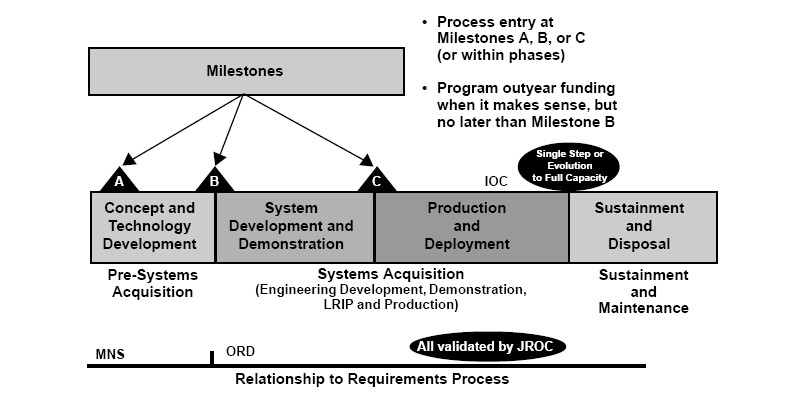
Model of the Acquisition Process

Behind any federal government acquisition is legislation that permits it and provided money for it. These are normally covered in authorization and appropriation legislation. Generally, this legislation does not affect the acquisition process itself, although the appropriation process has been used to amend procurement laws, notably with the Federal Acquisition Reform Act (FARA) and the Federal Acquisitions Streamlining Act (FASA). Other relevant laws include the Federal Property and Administrative Services Act of 1949, the Armed Services Procurement Act (ASPA) and the Antideficiency Act.

==== Antideficiency Act ====
U.S. Federal fiscal law is about Congressional oversight of the Executive Branch, not principally toward getting the mission accomplished nor getting a good deal for the Government. Fiscal law frequently prevents government agencies from signing agreements that commercial entities would sign. Therefore, fiscal law can constrain a federal agency from the quickest, easiest, or cheapest way to accomplish its mission. This constitutionally mandated oversight of the use of public funds is associated with the principle of checks and balances. A good working relationship and robust communication between the Executive and Legislative branches is the key to avoiding problems in this area.

The power within fiscal law comes from the Antideficiency Act (ADA), which provides that no one can obligate the Government to make payments for which money has not already been appropriated. The ADA also prohibits the Government from receiving gratuitous services without explicit statutory authority. In particular, an ADA violation occurs when a Federal agency uses appropriated funds for a different purpose than is specified in the appropriations act which provided the funds to the agency. The ADA is directly connected to several other fiscal laws, namely the Purpose Act and the Bona Fide Needs Rule.

Money appropriated for one purpose cannot be used for a different purpose, according to the Purpose Act (31 U.S.C. § 1301). The annual DoD appropriations acts include approximately 100 different appropriations (known as "colors of money"), and by this rule operations and maintenance (O&M) funds may not be used to buy weapons. Even an expenditure within the apparent scope of one appropriation may not be permissible if there is a more specific appropriation or the agency has made a previous funds election contrary to the proposed use of funds. For example, O&M fund can be used for purchasing repair parts, but if the parts are required to effect a major service life extension that is no longer repair but replacement – procurement funds must be used if the total cost is more than $250,000 (otherwise known as the Other Procurement threshold, for example, Other Procurement Army (OPA) threshold) or another procurement appropriation is available such as the armored vehicle or weapons appropriation.

An Antideficiency Act violation can also occur when a contract uses funds in a period that falls outside of the time period the funds are authorized for use under what is known as the Bona Fide Needs rule (31 USC 1502), which provides: "The balance of a fixed-term appropriation is available only for payment of expenses properly incurred during the period of availability or to complete contracts properly made within that period."

The Bona Fide Need Rule is a fundamental principle of appropriations law addressing the availability as to the time of an agency's appropriation. 73 Comp. Gen. 77, 79 (1994); 64 Comp. Gen. 410, 414-15 (1985). The rule establishes that an appropriation is available for obligation only to fulfill a genuine or bona fide need of the period of availability for which it was made. 73 Comp. Gen. 77, 79 (1994). It applies to all Federal Government activities carried out with appropriated funds, including contract, grant, and cooperative agreement transactions. 73 Comp. Gen. 77, 78-79 (1994). An agency's compliance with the bona fide need rule is measured at the time the agency incurs an obligation and depends on the purpose of the transaction and the nature of the obligation being entered into. 61 Comp. Gen. 184, 186 (1981) (bona fide need determination depends upon the facts and circumstances of the particular case). In the grant context, the obligation occurs at the time of the award. 31 Comp. Gen. 608 (1952). See also 31 U.S.C. Sec. 1501(a)(5)(B). Simply put, this rule states that the Executive Branch may only use current funds for current needs – they cannot buy items that benefit future year appropriation periods (i.e., 1 October through 30 September) without a specific exemption. The net result of this rule is funds expire after the end date for which Congress has specified their availability. For example, a single-year fund expires on 1 October of the year following their appropriation (i.e., FY07 appropriations. (for example, 1 October 2006 through 30 September 2007) expire on 1 October 2007).

For example, operations and maintenance funds generally cannot be used to purchase supplies after 30 September of the year they are appropriated within with several exceptions – 1) the severable services exemption under 10 USC 2410 and Office of Management and Budget (OMB) Circular A-34, Instructions on Budget Execution, 2) Authorized stockage level exceptions and 3) long lead time exception. The Government Accounting Office (GAO) Principles of Federal Appropriations Law has a detailed discussion of these fiscal law rules which directly impact on the ability of a Federal agency to contract with the private sector.

==== Procurement Integrity Act ====
The Procurement Integrity Act (PIA), introduced after a three-year FBI investigation launched in 1986 known as "Operation Ill Wind", applies to persons who engage in federal source selections and includes prohibitions on gifts being given to source selection personnel, restrictions on the dissemination of procurement sensitive information and post Government employment restrictions. The Act applies to federal and contractor employees. Non-compliance may result in criminal or civil penalties, cancellation of the procurement, rescinding contracts, suspension or debarment. The Act is implemented at FAR 3.104.

The Procurement Integrity Act was revised by Section 4304 of the National Defense Authorization Act for Fiscal Year 1996.

The GAO confirmed in 2014 that its jurisdiction includes investigation of protests raising allegations of PIA violation.

==== Identical bids ====
President Kennedy's Executive Order 10936 of 24 April 1961 required federal agencies to investigate and report on identical bids received in connection with the procurement of goods or services. It was revoked by President Reagan in 1983 by Executive Order 12430.

Kennedy's order reflected concern that "the prevalence of identical bidding [was] harmful to the effective functioning of a system of competitive bids" and that "identical bidding [might] constitute evidence of the existence of conspiracies to monopolize or restrain trade or commerce". Reagan's order argued that the requirement had "proved ineffective" and "consume[d] resources that could be employed in a more effective manner to prevent antitrust violations".

==== FASA ====
- Federal Acquisition Streamlining Act of 1994 (FASA) Pub. L. No. 103-355, 108 Stat. 3243
- 10 U.S.C. § 2323 has language similar to FASA for the Department of Defense (DoD), NASA and the Coast Guard. In this legislation, Congress extended the affirmative action authority granted DoD by 10 U.S.C. § 2323 to all agencies of the Federal Government. See 15 U.S.C. § 644 note. Regulations to implement that authority were delayed because of the decision in Adarand Constructors v. Peña, 515 U.S. 200 (1995). See 60 Fed. Reg. 48,258 (September 18, 1995). See 61 Fed. Reg. 26,042 (May 23, 1996) (proposed reforms to affirmative action in Federal procurement) form the basis for the regulations to implement this provision of FASA. See 62 Fed. Reg. 25,648 (May 9, 1997) for Government response to comments on the proposal, and 62 Fed. Reg. 25,786 (May 9, 1997) (proposed rules), 63 Fed. Reg. 35,719 (June 30, 1998) (interim rules), and 63 Fed. Reg. 36,120 (July 1, 1998) (interim rules), Federal Acquisition Regulation, Reform of Affirmative Action in Federal Procurement addressing the General Services Administration (GSA), NASA, and DoD.

=== Federal Acquisition Regulation ===
The procurement process is subject to legislation and regulation separate from the authorization and appropriation process. These regulations are included in the Code of Federal Regulations ("CFR"), the omnibus listing of Government regulations, as Title 48. Chapter 1 of Title 48 is commonly called the Federal Acquisition Regulation ("FAR"). The remaining chapters of Title 48 are supplements to the FAR for specific agencies.

The process for promulgating regulations including the Federal Acquisition Regulation (FAR) includes publication of proposed rules in the Federal Register and receipt of comments from the public before issuing the regulation. Courts treat the FAR as having the "force and effect of law", and Contracting Officers do not have the authority to deviate from it. Supplements to the FAR have been issued following the same process, and have the same force and effect.

The FAR and its supplements permit a substantial variation from the purchases of paperclips to battleships. The Contracting Officer and the contractor must seek to achieve their sometimes conflicting goals while following the requirements of the regulations. As with any complex document (in book form, Title 48 of the CFR requires several shelves), the FAR and its supplements can be interpreted differently by different people.

=== Overseas suppliers ===
Under the WTO Agreement on Government Procurement (GPA) and also some free trade agreements, the United States has undertaken to ensure procurements covered by the GPA are opened up to overseas suppliers "in a manner consistent with ... international obligations". Some agreements allow overseas suppliers to access government procurement markets and provide for reciprocal rights for US suppliers to access foreign government contracting opportunities. President Donald Trump's Executive Order 13788 (18 April 2017) provided for a review of such agreements so as to identify whether any could be considered to undermine US interests. In regard to states' procurement, an example of support for overseas suppliers' market access was a roundtable on government procurement and commercial opportunities held in North Carolina in November 2023, where North Carolina officials shared insights into how British companies could engage in North Carolina's procurement processes.

=== Trade-in or sales authority ===
40 USC 181(c) provides that "In acquiring personal property, any executive agency, under regulations to be prescribed by the Administrator, subject to regulations prescribed by the Administrator for Federal Procurement Policy pursuant to the Office of Federal Procurement Policy Act, may exchange or sell similar items and may apply the exchange allowance or proceeds of sale in such cases in whole or in part payment for the property acquired". The Federal Property and Administrative Services Act of 1949 gives agencies general authority to sell federal personal property and use the proceeds to replace similar property during the same fiscal year or the next one, like a used car trade-in.

The Miscellaneous Receipts Act mandates that funds received by the US Government must be deposited in the miscellaneous receipts account at the US Treasury unless a specific exemption was authorized by Congress. The Miscellaneous Receipts Act prevents the Executive Branch from financing itself except as specifically authorized by Congress. 40 USC 181(c) thus is necessary to ensure a command that essentially trades or sells items, frequently information technology (IT) equipment, can retain the receipts from the trade-in or sale and apply them to the acquisition of replacement items.

== Acquisition process ==
Generally, federal acquisitions begin with identification of a requirement by a specific Federal activity. A basic idea of what is needed and the problem statement are prepared and the requiring activity meets with an acquisition command having a Contracting Officer with an appropriate warrant issued by a specific acquisition activity. A contracting agency has the discretion to determine its own needs and the best method to accommodate them.

=== Military acquisitions ===
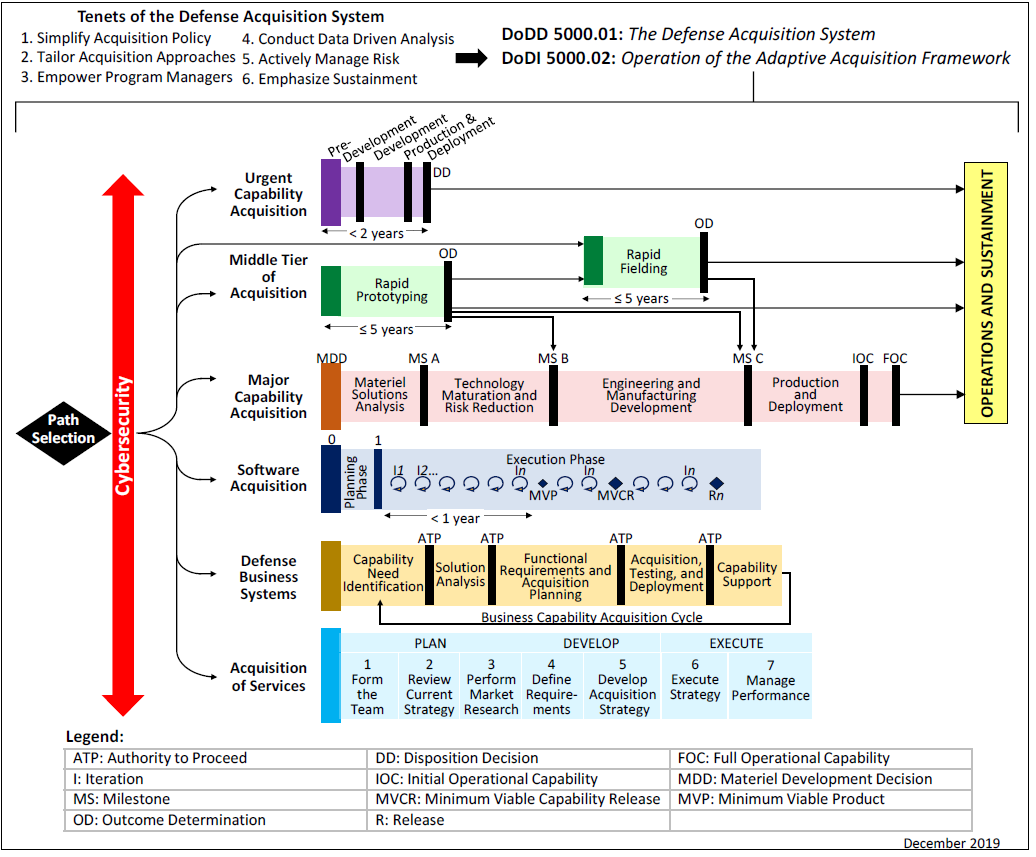
Overview of the Adaptive Acquisition Framework (AAF)

Procurements by military agencies have several unique aspects to their acquisition process compared to procurement by non-military agencies. The overall process is guided by the Adaptive Acquisition Framework which can be used for acquiring products, services, and software on anything from an "Urgent Needs" basis to a Middle Tier of Acquisition to a Major Capability Acquisition. These procurement needs are filled by acquisition programs, one of which is a Program of Record.

==== Urgent needs ====
The GAO raised concerns in 2011 regarding urgent needs' complex and uncoordinated acquisition processes, noting that

Over the past two decades, the fulfillment of urgent needs has evolved as a set of complex processes within the Joint Staff, the Office of the Secretary of Defense, each of the military services, and the combatant commands to rapidly develop, equip, and field solutions and critical capabilities to the warfighter. GAO identified at least 31 entities that manage urgent needs.

==== G-job ====
During World War II, some tasks in government contracts were given directly to workers, because the tasks involved military secrets and supervisors were not permitted to know the secrets. Workers would frequently reply "it's government work", or it's a "G-job", if supervisors asked what they were doing.

Some workers took advantage of military secrecy by doing personal work while on the job and falsely claiming they were doing a G-job.

After the war, "G-job" became slang for doing personal work while on the job and using their employer's equipment and materials.

==== Programs of Record ====
A Program of Record is a procurement program which is "a directed, funded effort that provides a new, improved, or continuing materiel, weapon, or information system or service capability in response to an approved need". A Program of Record requires certain documentation (eg. Acquisition Program Baseline (APB), acquisition strategies, Selected Acquisition Reports (SAR), etc.) and is recorded in the Future Year's Defense Program (FYDP) or can be updated from the previous year's FYDP. Prime government contractors bid to secure contracts to fulfill these Programs of Record. The term "Program of Record" originates from these programs being recorded in the budget as "line item record[s]", hence the name. However, not all procurement programs are programs of record. For example, acquisition programs made on an "Urgent Needs" basis are not considered Programs of Record as they lack some of the required documentation. Such programs can be converted into programs of record later on if that documentation is completed and the program adheres to the Joint Capabilities Integration and Development System, among other requirements.

The roadmap for the fulfilment of a Program of Record is split into five periods:

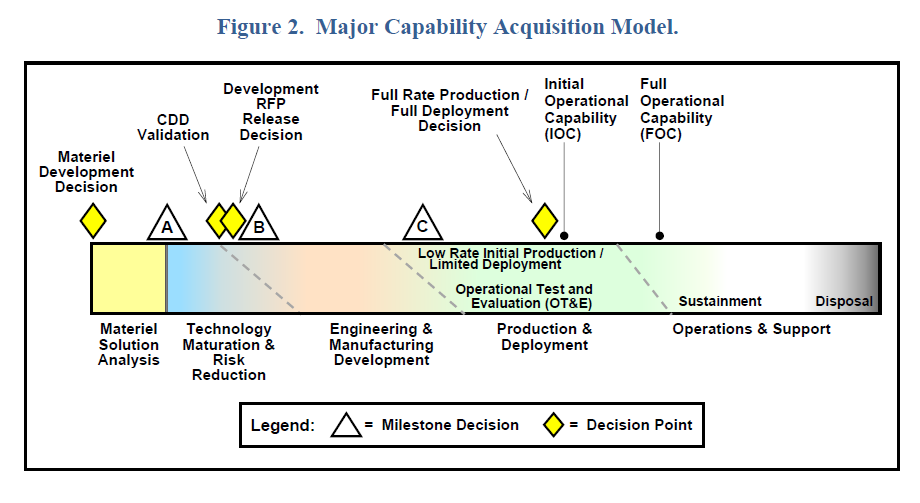
Roadmap for Major Capability Acquisitions

- Materiel Solutions Analysis (MSA)
- Technology Maturation and Risk Reduction (TMRR)
- Engineering and Manufacturing Development (EMD)
- Production and Deployment (P&D): this includes start of Low Rate Initial Production (LRIP), Operational Test and Evaluation (OT&E), transition to Full Rate Production/Full Deployment, and achievement of Initial Operational Capability (IOC)
- Operations and Sustainment (O&S): this includes achievement of Full Operational Capability (FOC) and continues out to the product's end-of-life and disposal

Key points along the roadmap include three major Milestones and four major Decision Points.

Milestones:

- Milestone A: typical requirements include having a draft Capability Development Document (CDD), completed the Analysis of Alternatives study, justified the affordability and feasibility of the program, identified the necessary technologies, established the scope of the program, estimated program cost, proposed an acquisition strategy, developed a test strategy for assessing the acquired product/service
- Milestone B: allows a program to enter the Engineering & Manufacturing Development phase. Includes approval of the Acquisition Program Baseline (APB)
- Milestone C: allows a program to award contracts, begin Production and Deployment phase, and enter Low-Rate Initial Product (LRIP)

Decision Points:

- Materiel Development Decision (MDD): the "entry point" in the major capability acquisition process; requires an Initial Capabilities Document (ICD) or equivalent, as well as a having developed the study guidance and study plan for an Analysis of Alternatives (AOA) study
- CDD Validation: affirms the capability requirements being sought in the product or service being acquired
- Development RFP (Request for Proposal) Release Decision Point: ensures that the acquisition program planned is affordable and achievable before releasing the RFP to the industry
- Full Rate Production/Full Deployment Decision: allows a program to begin full rate production of a product or full deployment of the product to units

=== Contracting officers ===
Each contracting officer (CO) has a specific warrant which states the conditions under which they are permitted to engage in Federal contracting as an agent of the Government. The authority of a Contracting Officer to contract on behalf of the Government is set forth in a public document (a certificate of appointment, formerly called a "warrant") which a person dealing with the Contracting Officer can review. The CO does not have authority to act outside this warrant or to deviate from the laws and regulations controlling Federal Government contracts. The private contracting party is held to know the limitations of the CO's authority, even if the CO does not. This makes contracting with the United States a more structured and restricted process than a commercial one.

Unless specifically prohibited by another provision of law, an agency's authority to contract is vested in the agency head, for example, the Secretary of the Air Force or the Administrator, National Aeronautics and Space Administration. Agency heads delegate their authority to Contracting Officers, who either hold their authority by virtue of their position or must be appointed in accordance with procedures set forth in the Federal Acquisition Regulation. Only Contracting Officers may sign Government contracts on behalf of the Government. A Contracting Officer has only the authority delegated pursuant to law and agency procedures.

Unlike in commercial contracting, there is no doctrine of apparent authority applicable to the Government. Any action taken by a Contracting Officer which exceeds their actual delegated authority is not binding on the Government, even if both the Contracting Officer and the contractor desire the action and the action benefits the Government. The contractor is presumed to know the scope of the Contracting Officer's authority and cannot rely on any action of Contracting Officers when it exceeds their authority.

Contracting Officers are assisted in their duties by Contracting Officer Representatives (CORs) and Contracting Officer Technical Representatives (COTRs), who usually do not have the authority of a Contracting Officer.

=== Planning ===
The Contracting Officer and internal departments/end users ideally undertake a planning exercise in advance of procurement commencing. Acquisition planning is described in FAR Part 7, Acquisition Planning, and in agency supplements to the FAR, for example, Defense FAR Supplement (DFARS) 207, Acquisition Planning and the US Army's supplementary regulation, AFARS Part 7, Acquisition Planning.

Acquisition planning is frequently dependent on the circumstances. For example, during World War II, quantity was the key. As in the Civil War, the U.S. achieved victory due in large part to the industrial base in the northern states. A war of attrition requires massive quantities of material, but not necessarily of great quality. During the Cold War, quality was key. The United States may not have had as many pieces of equipment as their opposition, but that equipment could be more effective, efficient, or lethal, and offset the opposition's numerical advantage. Today, the military needs equipment that works where it is needed, is dependable, has a high degree of maintainability, has long-term reliability, is agile and versatile, and aims to avoid equipment choices which might result in political debate and partisan politics.

As part of the acquisition planning process, the Government must address its buying power leverage. Many Government acquisition commands write acquisitions solely based on haphazard acquisition strategies which are primarily directed toward avoiding bid protests. Thus, it is necessary to emphasize competition and understand the acquisition from the view point of the contractor; Government acquisition commands should ask what is to be achieved and whether or not the program is really in the best interest of the Government, specifying needs in a manner designed to achieve full and open competition and including restrictive requirements "only to the extent that they are necessary to satisfy the agency's legitimate needs".

Where contracting officers recognise that acquisition documents have not been well formulated or are not suitable for ensuring fair and impartial competition, they have "broad discretion" to take appropriate corrective action. In some cases, the appropriate action will be to withdraw a solicitation and re-issue an amended one. In its review decision on an issue raised by Northrop Grumman Information Technology in 2011, the GAO notes that, allowing agencies "broad discretion", choices made by awarding agencies about the appropriate corrective action will generally be recognised, as long as they are appropriate to the concern being addressed. If there is found to be no impropriety in the agency's award decision or any impropriety is found not to have been prejudicial to the companies submitting bids, the GAO is more likely to question the corrective action. If the corrective action taken goes beyond the GAO's actual recommendations this will not in itself prevent the corrective action being accepted.

=== Preparing a proposal ===
Frequently, contractor proposals in response to a Request for Proposals (RFP) include an exact copy of the RFP's statement of work. An offeror's response usually indicates their approach to performing the statement of work, their approach to managing the program or project, and examples of past performance on projects similar in size, scope, and complexity.

Responsible bidders and responsive bids

Potential vendors responding to RFPs may be characterised as "responsible" and/or "responsive". A "responsible bidder" is one who is qualified or capable of meeting the requirements set out by the government in its bid solicitation or RFP. Kate Manuel notes that the concept of responsibility on the part of a bidder "has been the federal government's policy since its earliest days". James F. Nagle, in his History of Government Contracting, describes how Robert Morris made contract awards to the lowest-priced qualified responsible bidder in contracting for the U.S. Army during the Revolutionary War.

A "responsive bidder" is one who submits a "responsive bid", one which, if accepted by the government as submitted, will obligate the contractor to perform the exact thing being called for in the solicitation. FAR 14.301 states:

To be considered for award, a bid must comply in all material respects with the invitation for bids. Such compliance enables bidders to stand on an equal footing and maintain the integrity of the sealed bidding system. The Government Accountability Office (GAO) has observed that "responsiveness is determined at the time of bid opening from the face of the bid documents", and that "unless something on the face of the bid, or specifically a part of it, limits, reduces or modifies the bidder's obligation to perform in accordance with the terms of the solicitation, the bid is responsive". Furthermore, "the required commitment to the terms of the invitation need not be made in the exact manner specified by the solicitation; all that is necessary is that the bidder, in some fashion, commit itself to the solicitation's material requirements". In general, failure of a bidder to include completed standard representations and certifications does not render the bid nonresponsive because it does not affect the bidder's material obligations.

Evaluation

Evaluator scoring penalizes proposals that contain "fluff" or generic information that does not directly pertain to the specifics of the solicitation, i.e. the Government's need, source selection factors and work statement or performance specification. The proposing business is responsible for ensuring that it submits a well-written proposal with sufficient information logically arranged to demonstrate compliance with stated agency requirements and allow meaningful agency review: the agency is not required to piece together information to find compliance if this has not been presented to the agency in a coherent way. Charts and other infographics can help a proposal: examples include a six-line chart of the most compelling credentials of contractor's key personnel, or including a picture of a uniformed security guard on the pages describing contractor's uniforms. Professional proposal writers often have graphic design experience.

A proposal can be too long, causing the Government's source selection authority to skim over it. The Government source selection team may not wish to spend much time on the acquisition source selection. Also, it is possible for vendors to put too much information into proposals which do not go to the heart of the acquisition, particularly information not related to the source selection criteria as well as the work statement.

For simple acquisitions, Government source selection authorities have responded favorably to proposals which emphasize experience with the specific requirement that the Government is seeking to source and information on how a product or service will meet the needs of the Government as stated in the source selection factors and the work statement.

Contractors must also be aware of whether or not price is more important than non-price factors. Where price is more important than non-price factors, then the lowest-priced technically acceptable (LPTA) proposal in view of the source selection factors and work statement requirements will be selected. FAR 15.101-2(a) identifies LPTA as "appropriate ... when the government 'expects' it can achieve the best value from selecting the proposal that is technically acceptable and offers the lowest evaluated price". Where the solicitation indicates that the requirement is a best value acquisition, then a contractor must draft their proposal to emphasize how their proposed technical solution will meet each and every requirement and source selection factor.

Prices may be obtained from bidders with a view to the lowest cost bidder being appointed to a contract. However, the contracting officer may review performance information concerning the lowest bidder before determining that they are suitable to be awarded the contract. An Ohio case in 1999 reviewed by the US Court of Appeals for the Sixth Circuit found that the lowest bidder, Leo J. Brielmaier Co., did not acquire a "property interest" in a contract it believed it had earned via its low bid, and the housing authority was justified in withholding contract award after identifying past performance concerns. The court ruled that a contractor acquires a property interest when a contract has been awarded or where a contracting officer failing to award a contract to a bidder has abused their discretion in determining contract award.

For more complex acquisitions, source selection authorities will be interested in how the contractor will produce service or non-service deliverables. Thus, staffing plans, methodology to produce, past experience, ISO certifications, and other information which shows that risks to the Government acquisition have been identified and mitigated should be rated higher than other proposals which do not show such information. However, it is important that the proposal first and foremost address the solicitation's work statement or technical specifications and source selection factors.

Contractors must also be aware of the contract clauses in the contract to include requirements for specific standards which do not directly relate to the deliverables in question to include small business or minority set-aside requirements, Davis-Bacon (essentially local union labor rates must be used), specific accounting standards, specific certifications, etc.

A variety of factors can affect the contracting process and the contract clauses that are used in a Federal acquisition, including:

- Cost: A number of cost thresholds exist which trigger increasing degrees of complexity in the acquisition process. These thresholds include the micro-purchase threshold, the simplified acquisition threshold, and the commercial items threshold. The micro-purchase threshold, as of August 2007, is generally $3,000, with some exception. No competition or publication requirements are mandated for micro-purchases; generally, the Government Commercial Purchase Card (GCPC) can be used for these purchases under FAR Part 13. From $3,000 to $100,000, agencies may make use of Simplified Acquisition Procedures under FAR Part 13. Blanket purchase agreements, basic ordering agreements, or other contracts may be awarded under simplified procedures, which allow supplies or services to be ordered at a predetermined fair and reasonable price. The simplified acquisition threshold can be increased in situations specified in FAR Part 13, including overseas contingency operations (for example, military operations) and during nuclear/biological/radiological disasters up to the limits described in FAR Part 2, Definitions. FAR Part 13 simplified acquisition procedures can be used up to $5,000,000 ($11M under specified exceptions) under a test program in which Congress continues to reauthorize for acquisition of commercial items under FAR Subpart 13.5, Test Program for Certain Commercial Items. Items must qualify as a commercial item under the definition of FAR Part 2 and be supported by market research as specified in FAR Part 10.
- Type of acquisition (FAR Part 16, Types of Contracts): There are two main types of contracts – fixed price and cost reimbursement. In deciding which type to use, a Contracting Officer's identification of risk is key. A very well known requirement, such as for commercial off-the-shelf (COTS) items (in which no R&D would be needed and there are no high risk aspects) would be best acquired using a fixed-price contract, in which a price is fixed and includes the contractor's profit; all risk of cost overrun is transferred to the contractor. A higher risk, more unknown requirement is more suited for cost reimbursement type contracts, in which the contractor is reimbursed for all costs, and is paid a fee above that amount. In this arrangement, cost overrun risk is placed mainly upon the Government.
- Buying patterns: If an agency has a continuing need for a requirement over a period of time, a vehicle that permits multiple orders may be advantageous. For example, a blanket purchasing agreement (BPA) or a basic ordering agreement (BOA) as described in FAR Part 13 may be used, which allow for repeated purchases at predetermined fair and reasonable prices. Above the simplified acquisition threshold, an indefinite-delivery, indefinite-quantity (IDIQ) contract may be executed, as described in FAR Part 16.5.
- Availability of existing contract vehicles: Agencies may use existing BPAs or BOAs, provided that the use is within the general scope of the contract. For example, an agency can make use of Federal Supply Schedules as described in FAR Subpart 8.4. Schedules offered by the General Services Administration (GSA) provide a number of pre-competed contract vehicles that give an immediate ability to obtain goods or services without going through the full contracting process.
- Mandatory Sources: FAR Part 8 discusses the mandatory use of certain sources for acquiring some types of supplies and services. These sources include the Federal Prison Industries, various vendors who hire blind and disabled persons, and Federal Supply Schedules. Certain items cannot be purchased by most agencies, such as passenger motor vehicles; all passenger motor vehicles must be purchased by GSA, unless a waiver is obtained. This is due in part to Congressional restrictions on the use of appropriated funds to purchase vehicles and the special authority that GSA has as the Federal Government's motor pool manager.
- Small Businesses and Socioeconomic Issues: contracting with small businesses and firms affected by certain socioeconomic factors require a highly complex subset of Government regulation which is described by FAR Parts 19 and 26.
- Other requirements often apply to acquisitions depending upon the circumstances. These can include those listed in FAR Part 36, Construction and Architect-Engineer Contracts; FAR Part 41, Acquisition of Utility Services; and FAR Part 37, Service Contracting. Outside of a specified exception, acquisitions having a cost above the simplified acquisition threshold or the special authority under FAR Subpart 13.5 must be performed using the process specified under FAR Part 14, Sealed Bidding, or FAR Part 15, Contracting by Negotiation.
- Workload of the Government contracting office and requiring activity. Contract vehicle selection (primarily indefinite duration, indefinite quantity (IDIQ) versus stand alone "C" contracts), market research, competition, use of performance incentives (or not), earned valued management system (EVMS) use, length of contract, number of options periods, simplification of source selection strategy and evaluation factors, inattention to fine acquisition details such as with regard to technical data rights, bundling of contract requirements into larger contract vehicles, and other decisions having a direct impact on acquisition outcomes including cost are frequently driven by workload of contracting and requiring activities. Bundling of requirements to reduce contracting actions in particular reduce contracting workload but necessarily create increased risks and other undesirable impacts to include reduction of potential vendors who directly accomplish the work in question (thereby increasing subcontracting and decreasing specific experience with particular categories of work by prime contractors). Overbundling also reduces competition by reducing the number of vendors willing to take responsibility as a prime integrator over areas that are not in their core business. At some point, bundling reduces vendor base to so called prime integrators who do little to none of the work in house.

An acquisition plan may have numerous elements as listed in FAR 7.105; depending upon the estimated cost of the acquisition, these elements include:

- Statement of need and background
- Applicable conditions
- Cost
- Life cycle costs if applicable
- Capability or performance
- Delivery or performance requirements
- Tradeoffs – expected consequences of tradeoffs among cost, capability and schedule
- Milestone chart depicting acquisition objectives
- Plan of action
- Potential sources
- Competition plan – whether full and open competition used, and if not, justification and authorization for a sole source procedure
- Source selection procedures
- Acquisition considerations
- Potential Government furnished information, equipment or services
- Security and/or force protection considerations
- Budgeting and funding
- Product or service description
- Logistics considerations
- Environmental considerations
- Contract administration issues
- Participants in acquisition plan preparation (including source selection committee)

During the planning of an acquisition, several key aspects of the effort are decided, including:

- The degree of competition required under FAR Part 6, Competition Requirements (i.e., full and open competition, full and open competition after exclusion of sources, or "other than full and open competition", also called "sole-source procurement")
- Publication requirements for the acquisition (FAR Part 5, Publicizing Contract Actions)
- Preparation of the SOW/PWS – a document that specifies the "who, what, when, where, how" of the contract; it must be specific enough for the contractor to adequately price the requirement and to be enforceable in court. Measurable outcomes must be stated clearly.
- Required amount and type of funding for the proposed acquisition
- Contract line item number (CLIN) structure: this is generally in Section B of an issued contract that is constructed in the Uniform Contract Format. The CLIN Schedule is what the offeror prices in their offer/proposal. It is often advantageous to construct a CLIN Schedule that matches an outline of the work statement. Failure to properly structure the CLIN structure to the contents of a work statement can lead to an inability to determine how much a contractor should be paid or penalized if performance issues arise.
- Source selection criteria (SSC): Source selection criteria "1) Represent the key areas of importance and emphasis to be considered in the source selection decision; and (2) Support meaningful comparison and discrimination between and among competing proposals." (FAR 15.304, Evaluation factors and significant subfactors).
- Independent Government cost estimate
- Market research: Market research is a critical part of knowledge-based acquisitions. Information-driven and informed decision-making requires complete information to execute successful acquisitions. FAR Part 10, Market Research, gives guidance on the process of market research and its role in Federal acquisitions. Effective market research assists the Government in understanding industry terminology, and the basic concepts of the desired service or equipment item, identifying potential contractors who can provide the item. and determining the correct scope of the requirement to best fit the vendor base. Lack of adequate market research often results in contracts that fail to achieve the customer's expectations.
- Acquisition Risks: Risk in contracting falls into three categories – schedule risk, performance risk and cost risk. Risks to the acquisition, including negative past experiences, must be identified and mitigation measures and risk allocation between the Government and a potential vendor determined.
- Government provided equipment, resources, support or information: Often, the Government must provide for equipment, logistics support, information, and many other items vital to performance of a contract. If there is proprietary information in the potential Government furnished information (GFI), then measures must be taken to avoid violation of applicable regulations.

==== Stripped Down Components ====
1. Work statement: Deliverable list with performance and objective specifications if not a service contract (no brand names except as an example)

- Measurable outcome deliverables in a service contract
- Construction or architecture & engineering (A&E) (FAR Part 36)
- Schedule / milestones (included in work statement)

2. CLINS matched tightly with work statement structure/outline

3. Source selection criteria

==== Risk ====
Contracting is all about risk allocation and minimizing risk to include cost, schedule and performance. The more vague the contract work statement, the more risk that the Government assumes.

- Risk from Program Manager, Contracting and Investor's Perspective:

Risk. A measure of the inability to achieve program objectives within defined cost and schedule constraints. Risk is associated with all aspects of the program, for example, threat, technology, design processes, Work breakdown structure (WBS) elements, etc. It has two components, the probability of failing to achieve a particular outcome, and the consequences of failing to achieve that outcome.

- Risk from a lawyer's standpoint:

Does this contract adequately describe all essential work / expectations, is there a schedule and is it enforceable? What are our remedies, if any?

Requiring activities and frequently contracting officers want to get an acquisition on contract as quickly as possible; sometimes too quickly. Thus, contracting officers and acquisition attorneys will frequently have to carefully review the overall acquisition to identify risks to cost, schedule and performance and recommend mitigation measures to decrease these risk areas.

- Risk from an investor's perspective:

What is my expected payoff? The larger the expected payoff, the larger the associated risk, and vice versa. An investor who is a shareholder in a contracting company will seek to carefully balance the expected payoff with the associated risk, and he is incentivized to seek a large payoff, as long as the risk is acceptable. This perspective is unique in the sense that risk represents both opportunity and danger to the investor, while it only represents danger to the Program Manager and the Lawyer.

In other words, there is a misalignment in the perception of risk between the Program Manager, the Lawyer, and the Investor. It is ultimately the Investor who owns the contracting company, and this misalignment will have an effect on the Investor's behavior and the stock's performance.

===== Requirement overbundling =====
Cost, schedule and performance risk can be increased by over-bundling of a requirement into a single acquisition exercise. Over-bundling dries up the possible vendor base that might otherwise compete for a requirement. Thus, it is critical that an evaluation of the potential vendors who might compete for the overall work statement / deliverables be accomplished. This analysis will frequently require splitting up a requirement into different components. The bundling of a requirement also has a detrimental effect on the SSCs and CLIN structure, making it difficult to use in source selection, price evaluation and contract administration. Northern Missouri congressman Sam Graves introduced draft legislation in 2014 intended to address some of the shortcomings of excessively bundled contracts.

Overbundled requirements frequently suffer from very vague requirements and work statements, particularly in service contracts. In service contracts, the CLIN structure is priced on a per person per hour basis rather than on the service work deliverables themselves. Government or contractor ability to prepare cost or price estimates for vague work statements is severely limited; accordingly, the Government will negotiate a labor rate, number of people and individual qualifications for the requirement given that is the only feasible way to get an idea of cost. However, use of per person/per hour pricing for services is a poor contracting practice given the Government retains virtually all performance, cost and schedule risk given the contractor has fully performed under the CLIN statement when they provide the qualified body, rather than providing the needed service. One could argue that a CLIN statement which overbundles work in even a well written work statement and prices the work on a per person/per hour basis with limits on the numbers of person and types of qualifications the contractor can use is in contradiction to the work statement given the means the Government has asked the contractor to price the contract bears no relationship to the actual work itself and the Government is directing the contractor on how to execute the requirement – thus interfering with contractor performance and a sign of an employee-employer relationship rather than an independent contracting relationship. Also, the CLIN structure which prices on a per person basis or per hour basis generally pays for such persons on an annual basis rather than merely for the service on an a la carte or as-needed basis, therefore driving up costs in many cases. Pricing on a per person or per hour basis is a sign that a contract likely also qualifies as a personal services contract under FAR Part 37 – technically violating at least the spirit, if not the letter, of the Classification Act and FAR Part 37 except in specific circumstances and with specific determinations and findings.

Use of prime integrators in overbundled contracts sometimes has led to poor results in a number of major systems acquisitions. For example, what would happen if say the US Navy went too far in allowing contractors to make choices that make economic sense in the specific acquisition but add cost to the overall Navy? Example is a prime integrator who gets a good deal on a specific radar system that is not used in any other ship system – makes this specific buy cheaper but overall this costs the Navy a great deal of money given a lack of interoperability that drives a need to stand up training schools, supply system, work force increase, etc.

Over-bundling makes it easy for contracting, but many times, especially for complex acquisitions, does not deliver the results expected by the customer or war fighter for complex acquisitions, especially acquisitions that the acquisition command in question has little experience with or has substantial turn over of personnel during the life of the acquisition.

Small business acquisitions have mandatory restrictions on over-bundling. However, non-small business acquisitions are not subject to the same rules.

Example of how over-bundling causes big problems (permutations and evaluation of total price in source selection): Lets say a requiring activity wants to get polling services. Acquisition planning reveals there are five polls in ten different regions. However, it turns out that the Government will only be ordering one of the five polls in any real numbers and that particular poll is much more expensive in actual cost than the other four. If a weighting scheme is not applied to this bundled requirement, a vendor can make the four lightly ordered polls very cheap in their offer and the high volume poll very expensive, based on their knowledge of the ordering patterns of the Government in past acquisitions. Thus, on its face, the overall price of a bid when each poll is added together to arrive at a total price (used in source selection) would look attractive but in practice, the Government will burn through its budget very quickly given the vast majority of the actually ordered polls are extremely expensive (even though the actual cost of the most frequently ordered poll is far less than what was in the offer). To avoid the headache of a weighting scheme, all five polls should be broken apart and contracted for separately so they can be judged on their merits. This is an example of what is frequently done on major indefinite duration, indefinite quantity (IDIQ) contracts and explains why some acquisitions are appallingly expensive and require additional funding to achieve the requiring activity's objectives.

=== Statement of work ===
The statement of work (SOW) is a formal document submitted along with the request for proposal (RFP) to a vendor that defines the work to be performed, the location of the work, the deliverable schedule, applicable performance standards, any special requirements (e.g., security clearances, travel, and special knowledge), and the period of performance.

=== Source selection ===
Source selection refers to the process for evaluating contractor proposals or quotes submitted in response to a request for proposals (RFP) or request for quotes (RFQ) based on the contract solicitation. Source selection is driven by what instructions to offerors clause is included in the contract solicitation (e.g., FAR 52.212-2 with the tailored language spelling out what the source selection criteria are, weighting, etc.).

After the requiring activity has written their SOW/PWS, figured out source selection approach, then selected factors and subfactors, then figured out weighting of non cost/price factors, then understood consequences of the above, they write a source selection plan (SSP). A SSP gives instructions to a source selection committee on how to evaluate each proposal. Courts will defer to the source selection committee's business judgment, so facts must be included to base a decision on; the source selection committee must not be arbitrary or lack facts in the record for their findings.

Ultimately, risk evaluation is where a source selection team wants to be. That is what is used to determine weakness, significant weakness and deficiencies, which are briefed to unsuccessful offerors. Making the connection between risk evaluation/source selection criteria/factors and offeror proposals is what source selection is all about

The process used for source selection can be selected from FAR Parts 13, Simplified Acquisition, 14, Sealed Bidding or 15, Contracting by Negotiation.

Contractors competing for a Government requirement have an opportunity to request clarification or amendment of a work statement or solicitation. The request for clarification must be done relatively early in the acquisition process, preferably as close to the publication of a solicitation, RFQ, RFP or other publication. Frequently, contracting officers will agree to such clarifications if a contractor's request is well reasoned.

Key principles for source selection:

- Tell them what basis you are going to award it on (award criteria) (tell them)
- Award it based on what you said you would award it based on (do what you said you would do)
- Document what you did. (Tell them that you did what you said you would do in the first place) More is better as long as it makes sense.
- If discussions are held, read the bid protests on discussions first to make sure you understand how to do it.
- Formulation of a Competitive Range, defined at FAR 15.306(c)(1) as comprising "all of the most highly rated proposals", a tool which may enable uncompetitive proposals to be eliminated from further consideration.

FAR 15.209 states that if the Government intends to make award after exchanges with offerers after receipt of proposals, due notice of the intention to "conduct discussions with offerors whose proposals have been determined to be within the competitive range" must be provided. Notification procedures at 15.503(a) and debriefing procedures at FAR 15.305(c)(4) to FAR 15.306(c) must be followed in respect of offers excluded from the competitive range. If a competitive range is used, COs must send pre-award notifications to offerors thus excluded. An agency entering into discussions must provide "meaningful discussions".

If FAR Part 15 is used, there must be a proposal evaluation under FAR 15.305 to include a "fair and reasonable" price determination under FAR 15.305(a)(1), a past performance evaluation under FAR 15.305(a)(2) and a technical evaluation under FAR 15.305(a)(3).

For each factor rating, identify each offeror's key strengths, uncertainties and deficiencies of the proposal and then explain how the strengths, uncertainties and deficiencies resulted in that rating. Focus specifically on the factors and subfactors specifically stated in the solicitation/instructions to offerors. Do not use unstated source selection criteria to select the winning offer.

Discuss those discriminators that make one offeror better than another based on the selection criteria. Be as detailed and focused upon discriminators as the source selection results allow. If something was not a discriminator then say so and also state why it was not. If the strength had no bearing on the offeror's rating, state so.

Adequately address the impact of past performance on the decision; remember, no past performance is rated neutral.

A drafter of the source selection decision document must show the source selection authority's thought process and reasons behind the comparative analysis. Use a declaration of thinking/intent on the part of the source selection authority (SSA). For example: I selected; I thought; I determined; I reviewed; etc.

Source selections cannot compare the offers against each other, only against the award criteria.

Spend some time on the summary to make it correct, as it is very important. It is intended to put in words the best of the key discriminators used by the SSA to reach their decision.

Don't focus the discussion on only one offeror. The Source Selection Decision Document (SSDD) compares assessments of the successful offeror against the others. If there are a large number of offerors, the detailed discussion may be limited to the most highly rated offerors. Some light discussion of lower rated offerors is needed when a competitive range is not established.

Don't use ratings with contradicting supporting language, such as a "not detailed" rated "excellent." Examine ratings closely as they relate to your technical discussions. Ensure they are consistent (i.e., avoid having a weakness discussed in one proposal evaluation and not another proposal having the same weakness).

Don't identify or list weaknesses without discussing them and their importance to the thought process.

Don't treat a neutral performance confidence assessment favorably or unfavorably. (Don't disqualify an offeror for having a neutral rating.) No past performance must be rated as neutral under FAR Part 13 and FAR Subpart 15.3.

Ensure that, when documenting an award decision in the SSDD, SSA's are focusing on the underlying advantages and disadvantages of the proposals rather than merely the ratings themselves.

Agency regulations frequently provide guidance on source selection: see for example, AFARS 5115.308 Source selection decision:

A source selection decision document must be prepared for all source selections and reflect the SSA's integrated assessment and decision. The document must be the single summary document supporting selection of the best value proposal consistent with the stated evaluation criteria. It must clearly explain the decision and documents the reasoning used by the SSA to reach a decision. The document should be releasable to the General Accounting Office and others authorized to receive proprietary and source selection information. When releasing a copy to offerors or to anyone not authorized to receive proprietary and source selection information, redacted material should be limited to that which is proprietary and that which must continue to be protected as source selection information.

Consistency: what is bad for one proposal is bad for all; find an adverse comment, then look at the proposals of the other bidders and see if the same problem exists in there and was not written up in the evaluation for those proposals. What is good for one proposal is good for all proposals (See above)

Take a hard look at definitions in instructions given to source selection committee – look at the words in them; start with the worst definition, i.e., unacceptable, look at the words in it, then see if those words show up in evaluations that are rated higher than that definition in the rating worksheets.

Compare SOW and delivery schedules on solicitation (for example, RFP/RFQ) to what is in proposals word for word to see if everything was addressed. State if something is missing to justify lower ratings; talk about everything that applies for each award criteria to "pile on" good comments for proposals you like; then show that more good was said about the ones you liked, and less good was said about the ones you don't.

==== Source selection criteria ====
Source selection criteria (SSC) can be simple or complex depending on the subject of the acquisition. If FAR Part 15 is used, then a concept called best value can be used; best value simply is an idea that the lowest bidder is not necessarily the winner of a competition – rather, an evaluation of the overall offer based on specified SSCs is accomplished and a source selection decision is accomplished (see below) based on those specified SSCs using a fact-based business judgement of the acquiring activity.

SSCs can vary widely in complexity depending on the acquisition process used, for example, FAR Part 13, Simplified Acquisition, or FAR Part 15, Negotiated Procurement. For example, under FAR Part 15, there is a range of source selection models including:

1. Lowest Price (LP) that is Technically Acceptable (TA) based on statement of work (SOW) (LPTA) (use this for VERY SIMPLE BUYS – for example, pencils)
2. LPTA with Past Performance (partial tradeoff) (more complicated)
3. Full Tradeoff based on LP, TA, past performance and stated criteria including SOW (VERY COMPLICATED BUYS) (sometimes known as best value)
  1. Do not have to select lowest price
  2. Can select higher priced proposal that provides better solution to objectives
  3. A Business Judgment-based decision with rational basis

Vendor past performance is generally included as a source selection criteria. It is important to include a requirement for "recent and relevant" past performance. Inadequate SSCs render the best work statement and CLIN worthless.

=== Low value acquisition ===
If FAR Part 13, simplified acquisition is used, then a contracting officer can select from a range of processes, including a Government Purchase Card (GPC) for purchases under the micro-purchase threshold (see definition section of FAR for current value (for example, in U.S., it is currently $2,500), simplified acquisition threshold (see FAR definition section, currently up to $150,000 within the U.S. with certain exceptions), or up to $6.5M for commercial items/services. Under FAR Part 13, contracting officers are not required to use FAR Part 15 processes or follow the publication requirements of FAR Part 5, however they must create their own processes to follow.

=== Sole-source procurement ===
A sole-source procurement activity is where a contract is offered to known vendor(s) instead of conducting open competition, and the resulting contract is known as a sole-source contract. FAR Part 6 specifically forbids sole-source contracting when it is due to a lack of advanced planning. Non-competitive or sole-source federal contracts are primarily governed by the Truth in Negotiations Act (TINA). Enacted in 1962, the act requires contractors to provide certified cost or pricing data for contracts exceeding certain thresholds. Most recently, the threshold for compliance was increased to $10 million in early 2026 to adjust for inflation and streamline smaller acquisitions.

There is also a high-cost premium that is added to the cost of an acquisition when a buyer wants a supplier/vendor to rush to execute a contract or push their contract to the head of all other work the contractor/vendor is executing. As poor acquisition planning can lead to poor and unjustifiable acquisition outcomes, advance planning is recommended. Thus, it is critical to understand the time and resources required to properly plan and execute a federal acquisition: generally, the acquisition of moderate to complex requirements requires at least 120 days. Sole-source procurement is generally available where the CO considers that only one supplier is able to meet government needs. FAR 6.3 refers to procedures "Other than Full and Open Competition", and requires completion of a Justification and Approval (J&A) document, also called Justification and Authorization, before commencing sole-source negotiations.

A notice of intent must be issued in accordance with FAR 5.201. Other suppliers wishing to challenge the proposed sole-source must submit a timely statement of capability, in order to establish that the government should compete the opportunity. Failure to do so will prevent the prospective supplier having standing to challenge the contract award. A brief time period for reception of statements of capability such as 5 or 6 days may be reasonable where items are commercially available.

=== Metrics/performance measures ===
A metric is a meaningful measurement taken over a period of time that communicates vital information about a process or activity, leading to fact-based decisions.

Focus on where things go bad – not resource effective to measure everything. Instead, select the critical few metrics for mission essential processes, process that have historically experienced chronic problems or process choke points and monitor them.

- Characteristics of a good metric:
  - Meaningful to the customer
  - Simple, understandable, logical and repeatable
  - Shows a trend
  - Clearly defined
  - Data that's economical to collect
  - Timely
  - Drives appropriate action (this is most important feature of a good metric)
  - Shows how organizational goals and objectives are being met through tasks and processes

== Contract management ==
=== Contract administration ===
Contract administration tasks can include:

- payments (prompt payment essential) – frequently Wide Area Workflow (WAWF) is used.
- modifications and adjustments, typically done using a changes clause
- requests for equitable adjustments, which can be processed under FAR 49.002(c)) (these are essentially modifications under the applicable contract changes clause e.g., FAR 52.212-4 clause)
- terminations for cause or convenience; for commercial items, there are terminations clause in the FAR 52.212-4 clause.
- handling bid protests, ratifications and contract claims.

The DCMA Handbook has more information on contract administration.

=== Requests for Equitable Adjustments ===
Requests for Equitable Adjustments (REAs) are modifications of the contract that were not done formally or properly. REAs are frequently based on the changes clause. They typically occur when new work is added or a change in current work is ordered, perhaps by the contracting officer, without the required documentation. Changed circumstances and equity are possible justifications for a contractor to ask for a REA. Contractors can ask for delay damages arising from contract changes in REAs.

The burden of showing evidence of increased costs lies with the contractor. Special rules exist for entitlement to whether or not contractor is entitled to profit in addition to the actual costs they incurred, especially in the cases of leased equipment that was held over due to delays on the part of the Government or the Government's failure to properly integrate other contractors who then interfered with our contractor's work. Cases out there that say the Government can reduce profit if risk was reduced due to the change.

Can use the settlement procedures in FAR Part 49, per FAR 49.002(c) but be advised that this section is really written for terminations – you have to adapt the settlement procedures, probably for terminations for convenience, to the REA.

The Government should make sure there is a release of claims (ROC) clause in the REA's contract modification – FAR / DFARS do not have a sample ROC clause. In the context of FAR Part 12 commercial items, the changes clause requires bilateral agreement.

A substantial number of federal cases deal with REAs:

- "It is black letter law that every contract with the Government contains an implied obligation that neither party will do anything to prevent, hinder, or delay performance." Sterling Millwrights, Inc. v. United States, 26 Cl.Ct. 49, 67 (1992) (citing Lewis-Nicholson, Inc. v. United States, 213 Ct.Cl. 192, 550 F.2d 26, 32 (1977)).
- When Government actions delay contractor performance and increase costs, "the contractor has a claim for damages". (Lewis-Nicholson, 550 F.2d at 26).
- "A constructive change generally arises where the Government, without more, expressly or impliedly orders the contractor to perform work that is not specified in the contract documents." Lathan, 20 Cl.Ct. at 128 (citing Chris Berg, Inc. v. United States, 197 Ct.Cl. 503, 525, 455 F.2d 1037, 1050 (1972)).
- Contractors may recover excess costs through an equitable adjustment, however, it "bears the burden of proving liability, causation, and resultant injury." Ralph L. Jones, 33 Fed.Cl. at 331 (citing Wunderlich Contracting Co. v. United States, 173 Ct.Cl. 180, 199, 351 F.2d 956 (1965); Electronic & Missile Facilities, Inc. v. United States, 189 Ct.Cl. 237, 253, 416 F.2d 1345 (1969)).
- The standard of meeting this burden is high. Before an equitable adjustment will be granted, contractors must demonstrate: (1) increased costs arose from conditions materially different from what the contract documents indicated and that such conditions were reasonably unforeseeable based on all information available to the contractor; and (2) the changes in the requirements caused the increased costs in question. Johns-Manville Corp. v. United States, 12 Cl.Ct. 1, 33 (1987).
- A contractor must distinguish for the court those delays for which the Government is responsible as opposed to its own; the contractor's standard for proving damages does not require "absolute exactness or mathematical precision." Ralph L. Jones, 33 Fed.Cl. at 336 (quoting Electronic & Missile, 189 Ct.Cl. at 257).
- The court "needs only enough evidence to make a fair and reasonable estimate." Id. (citing Miller Elevator, 30 Fed.Cl. at 702; Electronic & Missile, 189 Ct.Cl. at 257).

=== Modifications ===
Two types of scope determinations in contracts. One is scope of the original contract – meaning, do we have to pay anything for this modification? The second one is whether or not the modification or change is within the scope of the original competition. The first issue comes up when a contractor demands more money (i.e., demand for more money in a CDA claim or REA); the second issue comes up when the Government wishes to modify the contract and the contractor agrees, but another contractor objects to the failure to recompete the contract.

Modifications are governed by the changes clause in the contract. However, the question of competitive scope must be determined first to determine if there will be a Competition in Contracting Act (CICA) violation first. As a collateral issue, the question of whether or not the modification is a good deal must be evaluated because any modification is inherently a sole-source award to the incumbent contractor. Thus, there is no price competition for the modification. If the acquisition was undertaken under FAR Part 12, Commercial Items, the Government has no ability to demand cost and pricing information from the Contractor to evaluate whether or not the contractor is ripping off the Government with inflated or padded charges.

With regard to competitive scope determinations, the GAO in American Air Filter Co., 57 Comp. Gen 567 (B-188408), 78–1, para 443, at 573, stated:

"The impact of any modification is in our view to be determined by examining whether the alteration is within the scope of the competition which was initially conducted. Ordinarily, a modification falls within the scope of the procurement provided that it is of a nature which potential offerors would have reasonably anticipated under the changes clause.

To determine what potential offerors would have reasonably expected, consideration should be given to the procurement format used, the history of the present and related past procurements, and the nature of the supplies or services sought. A variety of factors may be pertinent, including: whether the requirement was appropriate initially for an advertised or negotiated procurement; whether a standard off the shelf or similar item is sought; or whether, for example, the contract is one for research and development, suggesting that broad changes might be expected because the Government's requirement are at best only indefinite."

GAO issued a decision on 31 Jan 06 in DOR Biodefense Inc. and Emergent BioSolutions, B-296358.3 and B-296358.4 regarding whether a modification is within the scope of the original competition under the Competition In Contracting Act (CICA). Modifications outside the scope of the original competition must be competed or justified as sole-source actions. Scope analysis is not mechanical, but requires an integrated assessment of multiple factors, including contract type, specification or statement of work, cost and performance period. Whether the modification requires competition also depends upon whether the original solicitation adequately advised offerors of the potential for that type of change, and thus whether the modification would have changed the field of competition. In Biodefense, the Army issued a single award ten year indefinite quantity contract for development and certification of vaccines for biological defense. The challenged modification was exercise of an optional CLIN for development of a type of vaccine not expressly listed in the solicitation's option that extended the performance period for the option by 8 years at a significant increase in cost. The GAO determined that this modification was, nevertheless, within the overall scope of the original competition based on the broad developmental purpose of the contract and the solicitation's express notice to offerors that additional vaccine types could be added after award and that changes in regulation may affect performance period and costs. The discussion of actions taken by the Army in the original solicitation to put competitors on notice of the potential for post-award modifications provides good practice insight.

=== Claims ===
==== Contract Disputes Act ====
Contract claims are handled under the disputes clause in commercial items contracts or another clause in different types of contracts. The clause simply refers to another clause, the contract dispute clause. That clause invokes the Contract Disputes Act (CDA) and specific procedures that must be followed.

The Government seeks to avoid treating requests for additional money or changes to the contract as a claim, for several reasons. For starters, the Government has to pay interest from the date of receipt to the date of payment. Second, if the amount is over a specified amount, then the claim must be certified (see the FAR and CDA). Certification is essentially a company swearing under pain of 18 USC false claims act penalties that they are not falsifying the claim.

Instead of dealing with it as a claim, the Government should deal with it as a REA; the contractor will have to decide what is more advantageous to it – a REA or CDA claim.

=== Cancellation of contract ===
Contractors are understandably quite upset when an awarded contract is cancelled before contract performance can begin. There is some authority for a contractor to recover bid preparation costs in very limited circumstances. Before contracts are awarded, an agency need only establish a reasonable basis to support a decision to cancel an RFQ: in this regard, so long as there is a reasonable basis for doing so, an agency may cancel an RFQ no matter when the information precipitating the cancellation first arises, even if it is not until quotations have been submitted and evaluated. It is well established that an agency's lack of funding for a procurement provides a reasonable basis for cancellation, as agencies cannot award contracts which exceed available funds. Procurement authorities are presumed to act in good faith: in order for GAO to conclude otherwise, the record must show that procuring officials intended to injure the protester, and a protester's mere inference of bad faith is insufficient.

=== Terminations ===
The Government may terminate a contract for cause (commercial items), for default (T4D) or for convenience (T4C). Terminations for commercial items (FAR Part 12) contracts are governed by FAR 52.212-4(l) and (m), not the T4C or T4D clauses of FAR 52.249-x. FAR Part 49 prescribes T4D and T4C clauses in FAR Part 52 for non-commercial items (FAR Part 12) related contracts. In particular, T4D is covered by FAR Subpart 49.4, Terminations for Default. T4C is covered by several sections of FAR Part 49.

Termination for default reviews can be done a variety of ways, however, one method is to start with what is the ACTUAL deliverable on the contract, not the one that the customer thought they had. Carefully track what the contractor's actual performance is against the specific language in the contract. If there has been verbal changes by the Government without going through the contracting officer (which should never happen), is there something that indicates the contractor consented to those changes? In writing? For example, the DFARS 252.212-4 clause section that deals with modifications states that mutual consent is required for all modifications. In this review, use the language from the contract and then see if you have adequate evidence from the Government documenting the actual performance. Ask if the Government COR has signed any receiving reports e.g., DD Form 250s accepting performance (so they can get paid). Is there anything in the record that shows the Government placed the contractor on notice of their default or non conforming deliveries?

FAR Part 49 should be read that to get information on terminations including notice to cure and show cause notices. The more the Government tries to give the contractor chances to remedy their default, the more the Government bolsters its case that T4D is appropriate.

The various courts that review T4Ds have a high standard of review for T4Ds, so the Government should consider making sure the T4D is well supported and the Government has had little or no role in the contractors non-conforming performance as well as ensuring there is a clearly defined deliverable, several chances to cure and nothing in the record that indicates the Government failed to do something that was condition precedent to performance or the Government interfered with contract performance or failed to provide required cooperation/support. (For example, failure to provide security escorts or access to a work site thus causing delays on the part of Contractor performance).

The key point for T4Ds is that it is the only way that a Government agency can use prior year single year appropriated funds, such as O&M or many types of procurement funds, for reprocurement of the item in question. Accordingly, it is very important the Agency get the acquisition right up front because bad work statements and poor contract administration destroy the Government's ability to T4D, thus keep their prior year funds to get a replacement contractor.

Defense Contract Management Agency (DCMA) has a Terminations Handbook which is very useful in dealing with terminations for convenience issues.

=== Real options analysis ===
One approach to analysing government procurement of large systems such as weapons systems is to use real options analysis. Such procurements can be done in single annual lots ("single-year procurements" or SYPs), or, with Congressional approval, multi-year procurement (MYP) contracts. Multi-year contracts generally lower the risk for the contractor, and thus the unit price paid by the Government. One way to look at this situation is that a multi-year contract contains a real option for the contractor to escape the uncertainty associated with a sequence of single-year contract negotiations (analogous to a put option). Real options analysis can give an estimate of the value to the contractor of transferring revenue risk to the Government as a function of the contract's size and the volatility of the contract's value, even though the option is not actively traded. The negotiated price is also influenced by the attitudes towards risk of the negotiating parties.

== Wartime contracting ==
Allegations of waste and corruption in government procurement during wartime have led to special oversight measures being put in place. During World War II this function was provided by the bipartisan Truman Committee established in 1941. After allegations of contract fraud and waste were made regarding expenditure during the wars in Afghanistan and Iraq, the Commission on Wartime Contracting in Iraq and Afghanistan was established, modelled on the Truman Committee.

== Contractor voice ==
One organization which provides a contractor perspective is the Coalition for Government Procurement (CGP), a non-profit association of commercial contractors. The CGP is based in Washington, D.C. and is registered under the Lobbying Disclosure Act of 1995.

== See also ==
- Conjoint analysis – useful in determining essential elements of an acquisition from a customer's perspective.
- Cost-plus contract
- Economic conversion
- Federal Information Technology Acquisition Reform Act
- Governmentwide acquisition contracts
- Contract adjustment board
- Defense Acquisition University
- Defense Contract Audit Agency, responsible for audits of many defense contractors
- Defense Contract Management Agency, responsible for contract administration of US Department of Defense contracts.
- NASA SEWP, an example of an acquisition contract that expanded from its original narrow focus to serve the entire Government
- No-bid contract
- Small and medium enterprise
- Top 100 US Federal Contractors
- United States Court of Appeals for the Federal Circuit
