= Truth in Negotiations Act =

1962 United States federal law

Truth in Negotiations Act (TINA)

the 87th United States Congress
- Citation: Pub. L. 87–653; 76 Stat. 528
- Enacted by: the 87th United States Congress
- Enacted: September 10, 1962

The Truthful Cost or Pricing Data Act, originally and commonly known as the Truth in Negotiations Act (TINA), is a United States federal law enacted in 1962. The act is designed to ensure that the government and contractors negotiate on equal terms by requiring the disclosure of certified cost or pricing data for certain non-competitive contracts. It provides a statutory mechanism for the government to recover overcharges resulting from defective pricing where data provided by a contractor was inaccurate, incomplete, or non-current.

The law has been amended periodically to adjust certification thresholds and expand exemptions. Under the National Defense Authorization Act for Fiscal Year 2026, the mandatory disclosure threshold was increased to $10 million for contracts entered after June 30, 2026, and mandatory exemptions were established for nontraditional defense contractors.

Failure to comply with the act's disclosure requirements allows the government to seek a downward price adjustment for defective pricing. Enforcement is primarily managed through post-award audits conducted by the Defense Contract Audit Agency (DCAA) to ensure that the negotiated price was not increased by the submission of inaccurate data. In cases where data is misrepresented, violations of the act may also serve as the basis for litigation under the False Claims Act, which may involve treble damages and civil penalties.

== History ==
In the late 1950s, GAO audits revealed that defense contractors were frequently overcharging the government in non-competitive, sole-source negotiations due to a "lack of cost transparency". The act was originally passed following congressional investigations, which reviewed 53 reports from the Government Accountability Office (GAO) identifying over $60 million in increased costs to the government. Comptroller General Joseph Campbell attributed these overcharges to a "lack of cost data disclosure" in non-competitive negotiations. In response, Congressman Carl Vinson sponsored legislation to curb "excessive profiteering" and ensure transparency in the procurement process. President John F. Kennedy signed the act into law on September 10, 1962, as Public Law 87-653.

Originally enacted as the Truth in Negotiations Act, the legislation was officially renamed the Truthful Cost or Pricing Data Act by the 2014 National Defense Authorization Act. Despite the official name change, the acronym TINA remains the most common shorthand used by both the government and the defense industrial base.

== Requirements ==
Under the act, contractors are required to submit and certify that the cost or pricing data provided to the government is accurate, complete, and current as of the date of the price agreement. These requirements apply to negotiated contracts, subcontracts, and modifications where there is a lack of "adequate price competition".

=== Thresholds ===
The mandatory disclosure threshold has been adjusted periodically for inflation under a statutory mandate requiring reviews every five years. As of October 1, 2025, the threshold for submitting certified cost or pricing data was adjusted for inflation to $2.5 million for awarded contracts. Following the 2026 National Defense Authorization Act, the threshold for certification was raised to $10 million for contracts entered after June 30, 2026. Contractors are generally required to flow these thresholds down to subcontractors unless a specific exemption applies.

=== Defective pricing ===
The act provides the government a statutory right to a downward price adjustment, including interest, if it is discovered that the contractor's certified data was defective at the time of the agreement. A defective pricing claim does not require the government to prove intent to deceive; it only requires proof that the data was not accurate, complete, or current, and that the government relied on that data to its financial detriment.

=== Certification and disclosure ===
A certificate of current cost or pricing data is a signed statement from a bidder stating that, to the best of the bidder's knowledge and belief, the costs or pricing data which they have submitted in a tender are accurate, complete and current at the time.

TINA requires that contractors submitting bids should supply certified cost or pricing data before an agreement on price for most negotiated procurements for government contracts worth more than $750,000 for prime contracts awarded before July 1, 2018, and $2 million for prime contracts awarded on or after July 1, 2018 and before June 30, 2026. After June 30, 2026 the disclosure is required for contracts more than $10 million. Initially, TINA only applied to the Department of Defense, the Coast Guard, and NASA.

A form for a certificate of current cost or pricing data submission is available in the Federal Acquisition Regulation (FAR) at section 15.406-2.

==== Scope ====
The requirement for a certificate of cost or pricing data may also apply to sub-contractors at any tier in the supply chain.

Certified cost or pricing data may not be obtained for acquisitions at or below the simplified acquisition threshold. Other exceptions are stated in FAR 15.403-1(b) or may be adopted under a waiver requested by the contracting officer in exceptional circumstances. If certified cost or pricing data has been requested by the government and submitted by an offeror, but an exception is later found to apply, the data should not be considered to be "certified".

== Exemptions ==
There are several statutory exceptions to the requirement for certified cost or pricing data, including:

- Prices based on adequate price competition.
- Prices set by law or regulation.
- Acquisitions of "commercial products" or "commercial services".
- Waivers granted by the head of the procuring activity in exceptional circumstances.

=== Nontraditional defense contractor exemption ===
To encourage commercial firms and startups to enter the defense market, 2026 NDAA introduced mandatory exemptions for nontraditional defense contractors (NDCs). An NDC is an entity that is not performing and has not performed a contract subject to full Cost Accounting Standards (CAS) coverage within the preceding year. Under this provision, NDC products and services are explicitly exempt from the requirement to submit certified cost or pricing data. These contractors are also exempt from the cost principles in FAR Part 31, TINA, and various DFARS requirements. This statutory mandate replaces previous discretionary authorities, effectively treating NDCs as commercial providers to accelerate technology adoption.

== Enforcement and settlements ==
Since its enactment in 1962, TINA has served as a primary mechanism for the Department of Justice and the Defense Contract Audit Agency (DCAA) to recover funds lost to defective pricing. The post-award audit process is the primary mechanism for identifying violations of the act; DCAA examines contractor records for up to three years after final payment to ensure the negotiated price was not increased by the submission of inaccurate, incomplete, or non-current data. If an audit reveals that the government relied on defective data to its financial detriment, the government is entitled to a downward price adjustment, including interest and potential penalties, to recover the overpayment.

Early enforcement established the legal boundaries of what constitutes cost or pricing data, with subsequent audit programs in the 1960s and 1970s identifying hundreds of millions of dollars in potential price reductions. Enforcement focus shifted toward subcontractors in the late 20th century as the proportion of subcontracted work in major defense programs grew from approximately 10 percent in the 1950s to over 50 percent by the 1990s. Oversight reports from this period characterized subcontractor overpricing as a "frequent and pervasive" issue, noting that 43 percent of 2,066 subcontracts audited by the DCAA between 1987 and 1990 contained defective pricing. These audits identified more than $880 million in overstatements, with subcontractor overpricing accounting for approximately 63 percent of all defective pricing identified by the government during that window.

A major catalyst for this enforcement was Operation Ill Wind, a massive federal investigation into bribery and the exchange of "inside information" to subvert the negotiation process mandated by the act. During this period, the government pursued major manufacturers for inflating cost estimates; for instance, the FMC Corporation paid $13 million in the early 1990s to settle charges that it had provided inflated research and development costs to negotiate higher sole-source prices for the Bradley Fighting Vehicle. Similarly, Boeing paid $75 million in 1994 to resolve allegations that it had systematically overcharged the federal government on various military contracts over the preceding decade.

In the early 21st century, enforcement frequently relies on the False Claims Act, which allows the government to seek triple damages and penalties when a contractor knowingly provides untruthful data. Many contemporary cases are initiated through qui tam lawsuits filed by whistleblowers, which reached record levels in fiscal year 2025. In 2000, Boeing paid an additional $54 million to resolve two such lawsuits alleging the company used defective gears in CH-47D Chinook helicopters, a case that linked physical hardware defects to the financial disclosure requirements of the act. Another landmark settlement occurred in 2005 when Northrop Grumman paid $99 million to resolve a 16-year-old lawsuit involving allegations that it had inappropriately accounted for scrap parts and mischarged the government at its Illinois facility during the 1980s. These cases established a precedent where the government could seek triple damages for defective pricing, significantly increasing the financial risk for contractors who failed to certify their data accurately.

High-profile resolutions in the 21st century highlighted the act's broad application across the defense industrial base, with several landmark settlements. In 2015, the Department of Justice pursued a subsidiary of BAE Systems for allegedly concealing lower vendor quotes during negotiations for Army tactical vehicles. In October 2024, Raytheon agreed to a $950 million global settlement, including $428 million specifically to resolve defective pricing allegations on munitions and radar systems. Activity in 2025 included a $62 million settlement with L3Harris regarding military communications equipment and a $29.7 million settlement with Lockheed Martin concerning cost data for F-35 fighter jet manufacturing. These cases frequently hinge on the government's assertion that contracts would have been awarded for significantly lower amounts had "current, accurate, and complete" data been provided during negotiations.

== See also ==
- Competition in Contracting Act (CICA)
- Government procurement in the United States
