= Federal Acquisition Regulation =

Set of rules regarding government procurement in the United States

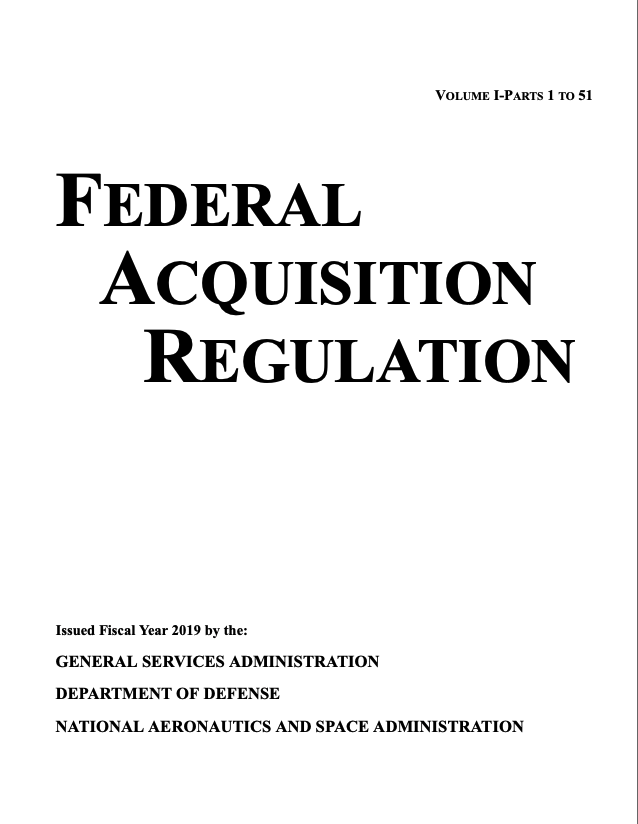
- Publisher: Federal Acquisition Regulatory Council
- Country: United States
- Language: English
- Website: Acquisition.gov

The Federal Acquisition Regulation (FAR) is the principal set of rules regarding government procurement in the United States. The document describes the procedures executive branch agencies use for acquiring products and services. The FAR is part of the Federal Acquisition System, which seeks to obtain the best value for agencies, minimize administrative costs and time required for acquisition, and promote fair competition for the suppliers of the products and services.

The FAR is issued by the FAR Council, a body composed of the secretary of defense, the GSA administrator, and the NASA administrator. This council meets quarterly or more frequently as needed, and the FAR may be updated multiple times per year.

The earliest regulation of US government procurement dates from 1792. Much of the FAR used today dates to 1984. It is codified at Chapter 1 of Title 48 of the Code of Federal Regulations.

== Purpose ==
The purpose of the FAR is "to deliver on a timely basis the best value product or service to the customer, while maintaining the public's trust and fulfilling public policy objectives" according to the FAR's introduction section.

== History ==
=== Early United States history ===
A need for laws governing how the government spends money for purchases was evident from the earliest stage of American history. General George Washington complained of profiteering during the US Revolutionary War, and created a government-owned cannon factory in 1777. Congress passed the first law regulating federal procurement in 1792, and has passed more than 4,000 acquisition related statutes since.

In 1798 Alexander Hamilton centralized government purchasing in the Treasury Department. The complexity of centralized procurement, even with the small government of the eighteenth century, proved unworkable. Authority was delegated to other government departments the next year. In 1809 Congress first called for competition among contractors. A series of Supreme Court decisions starting in 1831 affirmed that only Congress may withdraw money from the Treasury, limiting the executive's implied contracting powers.

=== Post Second World War ===
Following WWII, the U.S. Government required increasingly specialized equipment and services. This need combined with the experience of wartime spending and profiteering, meant a number of efforts to reform procurement and manufacturing. This can be seen in legislation such as the Selective Service act of 1948, Renegotiation Act of 1948, and the Defense Production Act of 1950.

The Armed Services Procurement Act of 1947 set the tone for the next several decades of government contracting. This act sought to standardize purchasing methods across the Army, Navy, and Air Force, and led to the creation of the Armed Services Procurement Regulation (ASPR). From its conception, the ASPR struggled to find balance between flexibility and standardization. The committee creating the ASPR recognized that flexibility is required for contracting officers when weighing factors such as cost, quality, timeliness, and methodology. President Truman, however, worried about this increased flexibility, writing in a letter to the committee: "It is of great importance in procurement matters to establish standards and definitions to guide all personnel who have authority to place contracts. Otherwise, differences in interpretation and policies may result in imprudent contracts."

At the same time, the Hoover Commission of 1947 included recommendations about government contracting. These recommendations included centralizing efforts to improve the federal supply system. In 1949, the Federal Property and Administrative Services Act did just that, by creating the General Services Administration (GSA) and transferring the Treasury Department's procurement responsibilities to this new agency.

=== The Federal Procurement Regulations ===
In 1956, a task force composed of the GSA, DoD, and Small Business Administration reviewed government procurement practices, recommended a regulation modelled after the military's Armed Services Procurement Regulation (ASPR). The resulting system, the Federal Procurement Regulations (FPR), were announced in March 1959 and applied to the 45 independent civilian agencies of the executive branch. Due to the variety of agencies for whom the guidance was intended, guidance was provided at a high level and specific implementation was left to each agency. In practice, this meant that procurement policies varied between executive agencies and often within each agency's divisions and subdivisions.

In 1974, the Office of Federal Procurement Policy (OFPP) was created to once again take on the task of unifying government-wide procurement regulations. The wide variety of implementations of FPR meant the burden of navigating these differences fell on contractors seeking to sell to the government. A History of Government Contracting by James F. Nagle writes that an OFPP study of 19 agencies in 1979 "uncovered 877 different sets of procurement regulations...comprising 64,600 pages of regulations, 29,900 pages of which were promulgated or revised annually. Eighty-three percent of these were issued from levels below agency headquarters." At the same time, the majority of the FPR and NASA's procurement regulations were largely identical to the military's ASPR.

=== The Federal Acquisition Regulation ===
In 1980, seeking to standardize government procurement, OFPP established the Federal Acquisition Regulation system. It would not be until 1984 that the first version of the system's regulations became effective. This was the same year that the Competition in Contracting Act of 1984 was released as well as the findings of the Grace Commission released its findings, followed two years later by the Packard Commission of 1986. The Competition in Contracting Act of 1984, which was intended to ensure the government gets more value for the money it spends by increasing competition among contractors, is the origin of much of the FAR used today.

Not every US executive branch agency is legally subject to FAR, though even those not officially subject to it often operate within FAR. Judicial and legislative entities often use it as well.

== Contents ==
The Federal Acquisition Regulation is contained within Chapter 1 of Title 48 of the Code of Federal Regulations (CFR). Chapter 1 is divided into Subchapters A-H, which encompass Parts 1-53. Chapter 1 appears in two volumes, with Subchapters A-G appearing in Volume 1 while Subchapter H occupies all of Volume 2. The volumes are not formal subdivisions of Title 48, but refer instead to the fact that the FAR is printed by the Government Printing Office in two volumes for convenience. Top-level portions of the document are called "FAR Parts," and their subdivisions are called "FAR Subparts."

The proper way to cite a regulation within the FAR is by part, subpart, section, subsection, without respect to chapter or subchapter. For instance, the FAR rule on legislative lobbying costs is found at FAR Part 31, Section 205, Subsection 22 (cited as "FAR 31.205-22").

=== Parts 1 - 4: General ===
Parts 1 through 4 cover general information about the FAR such as the purpose of the FAR system and the administration of the FAR. The parts define the authority and responsibilities of contracting officers, and definitions of terms found throughout the regulations.

The vision foresees "delivery on a timely basis [of] the best value product or service ... while maintaining the public's trust and fulfilling public policy objectives". Compliance with the Regulation, along with the use of initiative in the interests of the Government in areas not specifically addressed in the FAR or prohibited by law, are required and expected of all members of the Acquisition Team. The Acquisition Team consists of all those who participate in Government acquisition:

- the technical, supply, and procurement communities
- the customers they serve, and
- the contractors who provide the products and services.

The role and operation of those involved as a 'team' in government procurement is defined in FAR 1.102-3 and RAR 1.102-4. The FAR system is intended to promote "teamwork, unity of purpose and open communication".

Two agency-led councils, the Civilian Agency Acquisition Council (CAA Council or CAAC) and the Defense Acquisition Regulations Council (DAR Council), ("the two councils") have roles in coordinating revisions to the FAR which are set out in FAR 1.201-1. Membership of the CAA Council includes representatives of the various federal non-defense agencies.

Part 3 addresses various improper business practices and personal conflicts of interest. Within this section, subpart 3.6 generally prevents government contracts being knowingly awarded to a Government employee or to an organisation owned or substantially owned by one or more Government employees. Similar wording was previously included in the Federal Procurement Regulations prior to 1984, with several GAO decisions confirming that an agency does not violate this subpart if neither the Contracting Officer not the selection officer has knowledge of such ownership or business connection.

==== Ratification ====
A ratification is the proper authorization by a contracting officer of an earlier procurement by a Government employee who was not authorized to do it. A ratification package has a legal memo that says an unauthorized commitment was made, that the commitment could properly have been done by contracting officers, and that funds were and are available for it. Other regulations and agency rules apply too, such as those from the Army discussed below.

Ratifications are governed by FAR 1.602-3 (Ratification of Unauthorized Commitments), originally added to the FAR in 1988, which defines a ratification as the act of approving an unauthorized commitment by an official who has the authority to do so. Unauthorized commitment means an agreement that is not binding solely because the Government representative who made it lacked the authority to enter into that agreement on behalf of the Government.

A ratifying official may ratify only when:

1. The Government has received the goods or services;
2. The ratifying official has authority to obligate the United States, and had that authority at the time of the unauthorized commitment;
3. The resulting contract would otherwise be proper, i.e., adequate funds are available, the contract is not prohibited by law, the ratification is in accordance with agency procedures, etc.;
4. The contracting officer determines that the price paid was fair and reasonable and recommends payment, and legal counsel concurs.

There are dollar limits to the authority to ratify unauthorized commitments. A Chief of Contracting Office can approve up to $10,000. A Principal Assistant Responsible for Contracting can approve up to $100,000. A Head of Contracting Authority can approve higher amounts.

Ratifications in the U.S. Army call for a signed statement describing the unauthorized commitment, the value of the procurement, and other documentation. Then a contracting officer is to study the case and recommend action. If the procurement is not ratified, the matter may be handled under FAR Part 50 and DFARS Part 250 (Public Law 85-804) as a GAO claim or some other way.

=== Parts 5 - 12: Acquisition Planning ===
These parts cover requirements for competitions, sources of supplies and services, and contractor qualifications. They also contain information about planning an acquisition, conducting appropriate market research (FAR Part 10), and describing what your agency needs. Part 8.4 provides information about federal supply schedules, such as blanket purchase agreements and the GSA's Multiple Award Schedule contracts.

Part 10 includes a requirement that agencies use commercially available market research methods to "identify the capabilities of small businesses and new entrants into Federal contracting".

When the government buys commercial products and services, this is governed by FAR Part 12. This includes Non-Developmental Items (NDI) and commercial off-the-shelf (COTS) items. Simplified Acquisition Procedures are permitted for some items.

=== Parts 13 - 18: Contracting Methods and Contract Types ===
Parts 13, 14, and 15 define procedures used for purchasing products and services. They describe how the government will solicit offers and proposals, and how those offers and proposals will be evaluated. FAR Part 14 details the requirements for conducting a "sealed bid" tender, where federal requirements can be stated "clearly, accurately, and completely" and price is the only determinant of contract awardee. Under this part,

Unnecessarily restrictive specifications or requirements that might unduly limit the number of bidders are prohibited.

Part 15 (Contracting by Negotiation) outlines the processes for competitive and non-competitive federal acquisitions. This part implements the Truth in Negotiations Act, which mandates that contractors sign a [[certificate of current cost or pricing data]] for major acquisitions. This certification ensures that all data provided during negotiations was accurate, complete, and current as of the date of agreement.

Subpart 15.6 covers unsolicited proposals, i.e. business proposals offering new and innovative ideas outside the context of innovative proposals invited and offered within a government-initiated procurement procedure. The regulations suggest the executive agencies make provision for acceptance of unsolicited proposals and for prior contact with individuals or organizations contemplating submission of such a proposal.

Part 16 identifies the types of contracts available for use in government contracting and the rules governing the selection or negotiation of contract types. Part 17 covers special contracting methods such as multi-year contracting and reverse auctions, while Part 18 identifies when and how flexibility in contracting can be authorized in emergencies.

=== Parts 19 - 26: Socioeconomic Programs ===
These parts discuss small business programs, labor laws, environmental and safety considerations, privacy protections, and more.

=== Parts 27 - 33: General Contracting Requirements ===
Parts 27 through 33 deal with practicalities such as patents, insurance, taxes, financing, and disputes that might arise as part of contracting. FAR Part 27 and applicable agency FAR supplements, for example, DFARS 227, govern intellectual property (IP). This includes "technical data," meaning information of a technical or scientific nature. IP also includes computer software and software documentation. The FAR Supplement Defense Federal Acquisition Regulations (DFARS) defines these IP categories.

=== Parts 34 - 41: Special Categories of Contracting ===
These parts explore the details of special categories such as research, architect-engineer contracts, information technology, and utilities. Military service regulations also deal with this issue extensively: for example, See AR 40-400 Medical Support Provisions – Authority.

==== Accessibility ====
On Sept 10th, 2021 FAR updated its set of rules to shift from accommodations to building accessibility into the products and services government buys. federal agencies are now required to:

- specifically identify which ICT accessibility standards are applicable to a procurement;
- document in writing any exceptions or exemptions in their formal acquisition plans;
- identify the needs of current and future users with disabilities and proactively determine how ICT functionality will be available to these users;
- specify the development, installation, configuration, and maintenance of ICT in support of users with disabilities.

The new rules implement U.S. Access Board's revisions by strengthening FAR requirements for accessibility in Information and Communication Technology (ICT). Section 508 requires that federal agencies "develop, procure, maintain, or use" ICT. This adoption in FAR will help the public and Federal employees have comparable access whether they have a disability, or not.

==== Service contracts ====
Special rules apply to service contracts. They must be performance-based to the extent practicable, with measurable outcomes. FAR 37.102 and FAR Part 37.6 describe performance-based methods. FAR 37.601 has specific requirements for performance work statements (PWS) for service contracts requiring performance-based standards. Agency supplements also require performance-based acquisitions.

Performance Based Service Acquisition (PBSA) is a process and way of defining requirements that yields well written work statements that are outcome oriented and measurable thus enforceable. Deming/Six Sigma style quality assessments and process analysis can help define performance work statements. A Performance Work Statement (PWS) has:

- An outcome-based definition of the service deliverable
- Performance standards that are measurable
- A plan for measuring and evaluating performance
- A matrix of related services i.e., generator maintenance, that has subsets of services underneath them

The DOD PBSA guide has a "performance requirements summary" matrix which can serve as an outline for work statement provisions.

==== Personal services contracts ====
The term "personal services contract" means a contract with express terms or administration which makes the contractor personnel appear effectively to be Government employees. Such contracts are prohibited by the FAR (Subpart 37.104) excepting where specifically authorized by statute.

- Contractors are NOT employees – no remedies under personnel law and no remedies under contract law if vague/badly written work statements used
- Inherent governmental restrictions (See OMB Circular A-76) and FAR Part 37
- FAR Subpart 9.5 Organizational Conflicts of Interest Organizational and Consultant Conflicts of Interest (OCIE) problems

"Nonpersonal services contract" means a contract under which the personnel rendering the services are not subject, either by the contract's terms or by the manner of its administration, to the supervision and control usually prevailing in relationships between the Government and its employees.

Advisory and assistance services (A&AS) are permissible (per FAR Subpart 37.2). Personal services are not permissible (per FAR 37.104 and Classification Act) without statutory authority to obtain such services.

"Inherently Governmental Functions" may not be performed by contractors other than a specific Personal Services Contract under the authority of P.L. 86-36 or 5 USC 3109. Inherently Governmental Functions are defined by P.L. 105-270 (FAIR Act of 1998) as a function so intimately related to the public interest as to require performance by Federal Government employees. These involve the exercise of discretion in applying Federal Government authority or making a value judgement in decisions for the Federal Government, such as monetary transactions and entitlements, determination of agency policy or program priorities, and hiring or direction of Federal employees.

Examples of prohibited personal services:

- Clerical/administrative/secretarial support to Government personnel
- Technical/Managerial performance of same or similar jobs performed by Government personnel
- Any contractor personnel working in a Government facility and supervised/directed by Government

=== Parts 42 - 51: Contract Management ===
Parts 42 - 51 contain information about managing contracts, covering subjects such as quality assurance and contract modifications. FAR Part 45 provides rules on the Contractor's obligations and the Government's remedies in these cases. Specific clauses should be in the contract to deal with Government Furnished Equipment (GFE) situations and bring your own device (BYOD) situations.

The final three chapters of Title 48 (61, 63 and 99) establish the Civilian Board of Contract Appeals, the Department of Transportation Board of Contract Appeals, and the Cost Accounting Standards Board, respectively. The Armed Services Board of Contract Appeals has been established by charter within the Department of Defense.

=== Parts 52 - 53: Clauses and Forms ===
The largest single part of the FAR is Part 52, which contains standard solicitation provisions and contract clauses. Solicitation provisions are certification requirements, notices, and instructions directed at firms that might be interested in competing for a specific contract. These provisions and clauses are of six types:

1. required solicitation provisions;
2. required-when-applicable solicitation provisions;
3. optional solicitation provisions;
4. required contract clauses;
5. required-when-applicable contract clauses; and
6. optional contract clauses."

== Beyond the FAR ==
=== Supplements ===
As the original purpose of the FAR was to consolidate the numerous individual agency regulations into one comprehensive set of standards which would apply government-wide, the issuance of supplemental regulations is closely governed by the FAR. Nearly every major cabinet-level department (and many agencies below them) has issued such regulations, which often place further restrictions or requirements on contractors and contracting officers.

One of the best-known examples of an agency supplement is the Defense Federal Acquisition Regulation Supplement (DFARS), used by the Department of Defense, which constitutes Chapter 2. Chapter 3 is the Department of Health and Human Services Acquisition Regulation (HHSAR); Chapter 4 is the Department of Agriculture's Acquisition Regulation (AGAR); etc. The Department of Veterans Affairs' Acquisition Regulation (VAAR) implements and supplements the FAR.

The required format for agency FAR supplements is to follow the basic FAR format. To continue the example above, the supplemental DFARS section on legislative lobbying costs is DFARS Subpart 231, Section 205, Subsection 22 (cited as "DFARS 231.205-22").

=== Christian Doctrine ===
If the FAR requires that a clause be included in a government contract, but that clause is omitted, case law may provide that the missing clause is deemed to be included. This is known as the Christian Doctrine, which is based on the underlying principle that certain government regulations have the force and effect of law, and government personnel may not deviate from the law without proper authorization. Prospective contractors are presumed to know the law, including the limits of the authority of government personnel. Thus, a mandatory clause that expresses a significant or deeply ingrained strand of public procurement policy will be incorporated into a Government contract by operation of law, even if the parties intentionally omitted it.

A contract award can be challenged and set aside if a protester can prove that either the contracting agency or the contract awardee did not comply with the requirements of the solicitation. A successful protest can result in reconsideration of the decision to award the contract or award of the contract to the protester in lieu of the original awardee. Even though a successful protester may not ultimately be awarded the contract, the government agency may have to pay the protester's bid and proposal costs.

=== Independent research and development (IRAD) ===
Independent research and development (IR&D or IRAD) is a term used to describe the research and development activities carried out independently by government contractors, typically at their own expense. These activities, which exist outside of any specific government contracts, are intended to enhance the contractors' technical capabilities. They allow contractors to refine existing technologies and develop new ones, increasing their competitive advantage.

The regulation and treatment of IRAD play crucial roles in federal contracting, particularly concerning intellectual property and data rights. According to the Defense Federal Acquisition Regulation Supplement (DFARS), contractors can allocate reasonable indirect costs from IRAD to government contracts. Yet, technical data developed exclusively at private expense through IRAD activities is typically subject to limited rights from the government's perspective. On the other hand, data developed exclusively with government funds offers unlimited rights to the government. Contractors may, therefore, use IRAD as a strategic tool to generate valuable technical knowledge while maintaining proprietary control. Cost principles are generally read in conjunction with Cost Accounting Standard (CAS) 420.

However, balancing the interests of the government and contractors in the context of IRAD has proven challenging. Defense contractors have historically valued autonomy over which technologies to pursue, while the government has sought greater visibility into reimbursed IRAD investments. In response, a provision in the National Defense Authorization Act for Fiscal Year 2017 (NDAA) directed revisions to protect contractor autonomy in IR&D decision-making provided it advances the needs of the department for future technology and advanced capability. The same provision decoupled IRAD from bid and proposal (B&P) costs in statute. Consequently, the treatment of IRAD continues to be a pivotal consideration in the ongoing evolution of intellectual property regulations and technology development.

As the post-WW2 space programs developed, general research costs came to be seen as ordinary costs of doing business, and in 1959 they were allowed as indirect costs. The 1970 defense appropriations act temporarily limited the funding for the first time, due to concerns about adequate contract administration and benefits for the government.

=== Clauses for government contracts ===
- Government contracts have mandatory clauses that must be included in a contract document. The FAR and DFARS have prescribing sections in them and the FAR has a table which can be used to determine required, as applicable or optional clauses by subject matter
- FAR 52.301 clause matrix – right clauses for the category, e.g., supplies, services, construction or commercial items and Options? IDIQ? Contract TYPE (see FAR Part 16) (i.e., fixed price (FP), FP with economic price adjustment, cost-reimbursement, incentive, time and materials, IDIQ, letter contracts, agreements under FAR Subpart 16.7, etc.). Note in FAR 52.301 that a clause must be in both the contract and the solicitation but provisions are only in solicitations.

Contracting activities are at unequal stages of transitioning to automated contract generation tools which have a menu driven system which generates the contract with appropriate clauses. However, frequently contracting officers do not have sufficient knowledge that some optional or required clause is applicable in a particular case – especially for intellectual property or other specialized acquisitions. With the transition to the automated systems, many contracting officers do not possess the knowledge to prepare a manual contract without the automated tool. Also, the automated systems frequently do not allow inclusion of various non standard work statement, instructions or clauses due to limitations on input options.

== Criticisms ==
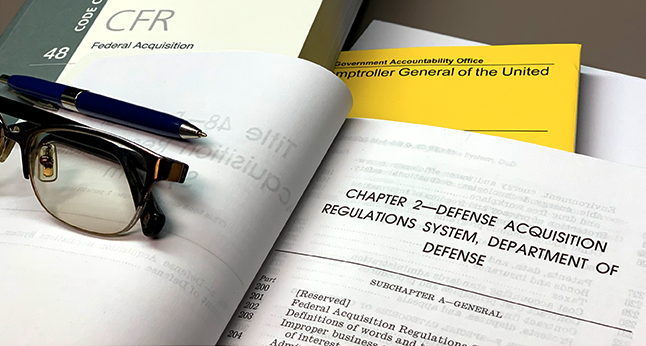
Acquisition regulations under examination by GAO in 2019

Some have suggested that the complexity of complying with the FAR discourages competition, especially by small companies, and that there are "so many laws that we need to implement that our contracting officers in the trenches can't even follow them all because they actually start to conflict with each other". Regulations, including the FAR, are excluded from the Plain Writing Act of 2010.

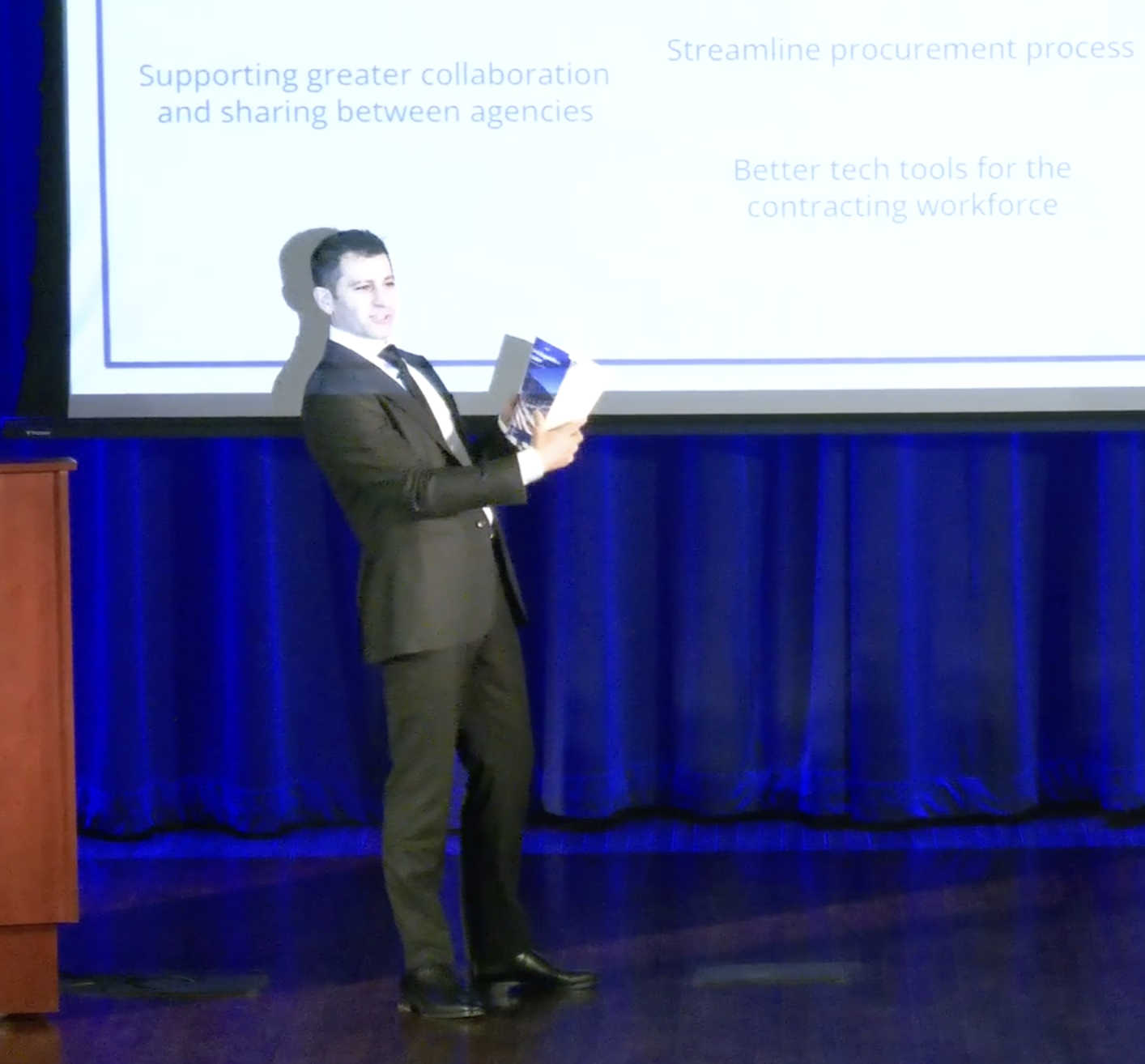
Stephen Ehikian complaining about the length of FAR in 2025

Proposals for reform of the FAR have been put forward on several occasions. In the 1990s there was strong pressure for greater liberalisation and use of discretion by Contracting Officers. Steven Kelman, former administrator of the Office of Federal Procurement Policy during the Presidency of Bill Clinton, wrote in Procurement and Public Management (1990) that the procurement system "should be significantly deregulated to allow public officials greater discretion", and that greater discretion "would allow government to gain greater value from procurement". More recently there have been calls for the FAR to be abandoned or rewritten, to exempt the Department of Defense from the need to comply, and the adoption of "other transaction authority" agreements (OTAs), along with criticisms of such proposals. Stephen Ehikian announced his intention in 2025 to "streamline" the procurement process.

== Other transaction authority ==
As an alternative to procurement contracts under the FAR, federal agencies may carry out research and development (R&D) or prototype projects by entering into a transaction (other than a contract, grant, or cooperative agreement) under their specific "other transaction" (OT) authority. Only those federal agencies that have been granted OT authority may enter into OT agreements: Congress has granted authority to 11 agencies, including NASA, Department of Defense, Federal Aviation Administration, Department of Transportation, and Department of Homeland Security.

== See also ==
- Government procurement in the United States
- System for Award Management
- Sustainable procurement
- Title 48 of the Code of Federal Regulations
