= Federal Information Technology Acquisition Reform Act =

- Long title: To amend titles 40, 41, and 44, United States Code, to eliminate duplication and waste in information technology acquisition and management.
- Announced in: the 113th United States Congress
- Sponsored by: Rep. Darrell E. Issa (R, CA-49)
- Number of co-sponsors: 1

Codification
- Acts affected: Rehabilitation Act of 1973, E-Government Act of 2002
- U.S.C. sections affected: 31 U.S.C. § 901, 40 U.S.C. § 11302, 40 U.S.C. § 11501, 44 U.S.C. § 3506, 40 U.S.C. § 11315, and others.
- Agencies affected: United States Congress, Government Accountability Office, Executive Office of the President, Office of Management and Budget, Office of Personnel Management, General Services Administration, United States Department of Defense

Legislative history
- Introduced in the House as H.R. 1232 by Rep. Darrell E. Issa (R, CA-49) on March 18, 2013; Committee consideration by United States House Committee on Oversight and Government Reform; Passed the House on February 25, 2014 (voice vote)

The Federal Information Technology Acquisition Reform Act made changes to the ways the U.S. federal government buys and manages computer technology. It became law as a part of the National Defense Authorization Act for Fiscal Year 2015 (Title VIII, Subtitle D, H.R. 3979.

One of the requirements would be that the government develop a streamlined plan for its acquisitions. The bill would increase the power of existing chief information officers (CIO) within federal agencies so that they could be more effective. Each agency would also be reduced to having only one CIO in the agency, who is then responsible for the success and failure of all IT projects in that agency. The bill would also require the federal government to make use of private sector best practices. The bill is intended to reduce IT procurement related waste.

Earlier versions of FITARA were introduced in 2013 (H.R. 1232) and passed in a voice vote in the United States House of Representatives during the 113th United States Congress.

== Background ==
The U.S. federal government spends over $80 billion a year on IT products and services. Almost half of this goes to maintaining old and out-of-date systems.

== Provisions of the bill ==
This summary is based largely on the summary provided by the Congressional Research Service, a public domain source.

The Federal Information Technology Acquisition Reform Act would modify the current framework governing the management of information technology (IT) within the federal government to: (1) require presidential appointment or designation of the chief information officer (CIO) in 16 specified federal agencies (thereby providing consistency with the presidential appointment or designation of chief financial officers for such agencies, but specifically excludes the United States Department of Defense [DOD] and provides for the heads of other agencies to continue to designate an agency CIO), (2) designate the Chief Information Officers Council as the lead interagency forum for improving agency coordination information resources investment, and (3) require the Comptroller General (GAO) to examine the effectiveness of the Council.

The bill would direct such CIOs to report directly to the head of the agency. It would set forth authorities relating to budget planning and the hiring of IT personnel.

The bill would require each agency to have only one CIO but permits offices within an agency to designate a deputy, associate, or assistant CIO.

The bill would require the Federal Chief Information Officer (FCIO) (defined as the Administrator of the Office of E-Government & Information Technology in the Office of Management and Budget [OMB]) to develop and implement an initiative to be known as the Federal Data Center Optimization Initiative to optimize the usage and efficiency of federal data centers. It would also set forth permitted methods for agencies to consolidate data centers and achieve maximum server utilization and energy efficiency. The bill would require agencies to track costs resulting from implementation of the Initiative within the agency and submit an annual report on such costs to the FCIO.

The bill would require the OMB Director to: (1) develop a plan for conducting a government-wide inventory of IT assets, and (2) assess all publicly available websites of federal agencies and require agencies to eliminate or consolidate any duplicate or overlapping websites.

The bill would express the sense of Congress that transition to cloud computing offers significant potential benefits for the implementation of federal IT projects. The bill would also permit CIOs to establish cloud service working capital funds.

The bill would prohibit an executive agency from issuing a solicitation for certain covered contract vehicles unless the agency performs a business case analysis and obtains approval from the Administrator for Federal Procurement Policy (FPP).

The bill would direct the OMB Director to: (1) establish a Federal Infrastructure and Common Application Collaboration Center to serve as a focal point for coordinated program management practices and to develop and maintain requirements for the acquisition of IT infrastructure and applications commonly used by federal agencies, and (2) designate Assisted Acquisition Centers of Excellence (AACEs) to develop areas of specialized acquisition expertise within various executive agencies. Sets forth authority for AACEs to implement best practices, assist agencies in expedient and low-cost interagency acquisitions by engaging in repeated and frequent acquisition of similar IT requirements, and assist with recruitment and training.

The bill would require the OMB Director to submit to Congress: (1) a five-year strategic plan to develop, strengthen, and solidify IT acquisition cadres; and (2) a plan for improving management of IT programs and projects.

The bill would direct the FPP Administrator to prescribe regulations requiring a comparative value analysis to be included in the contract file when the federal government purchases services and supplies offered under the Federal Strategic Sourcing Initiative from sources outside such Initiative.

The bill would permit executive agencies to state in solicitations that awards will be made using a fixed price technical competition under which all offerors compete solely on nonprice factors and the fixed award price is pre-announced in the solicitation.

The bill would require additional information concerning blanket purchase agreements and IT investments to be made available to the public.

The bill would establish guidance with respect to the validity of open source software as a procurement option required to receive full consideration alongside other options (in merit-based requirements development and evaluation processes promoting choices based on performance and value) in a manner free of preconceived preferences based on how technology is developed, licensed, or distributed within the federal government. Prohibits such guidance from modifying the federal policy of following technology-neutral principles when selecting and acquiring information technology.

The bill would require federal computer standards to include guidelines necessary to enable effective adoption of open source software. Directs the OMB Director to issue guidance for the use and collaborative development of open source software within the federal government.

== Congressional Budget Office report ==
This summary is based largely on the summary provided by the Congressional Budget Office, as ordered reported by the House Committee on Oversight and Government Reform on March 20, 2013. This is a public domain source.

H.R. 1232 would amend the laws governing the procurement and management of information technology (IT) throughout the federal government. Specifically, the legislation would increase the authority of Chief Information Officers (CIOs) and the CIO Council, establish a collaboration center to coordinate the acquisition of IT products, and require a number of additional reports and analysis by government agencies.

The Congressional Budget Office (CBO) estimates that implementing H.R. 1232 would cost $145 million over the 2014-2018 period, assuming appropriation of the necessary amounts. Enacting the bill could affect direct spending by agencies not funded through annual appropriations; therefore, pay-as-you-go procedures apply. CBO estimates, however, that any net increase in spending by those agencies would not be significant. Enacting the bill would not affect revenues.

H.R. 1232 contains no intergovernmental or private-sector mandates as defined in the Unfunded Mandates Reform Act and would impose no costs on state, local, or tribal governments.

== Procedural history ==
The Federal Information Technology Acquisition Reform Act was introduced into the United States House of Representatives on March 18, 2013 by Rep. Darrell E. Issa (R, CA-49). It was referred to the United States House Committee on Oversight and Government Reform. House Majority Leader Eric Cantor announced on February 21, 2014 that the bill would be considered under a suspension of the rules on February 25, 2014. On February 25, 2014, the House voted to pass the bill in a voice vote.

== Debate and discussion ==
The Federal Times said that this bill makes the "most significant changes to the federal IT procurement system since the Information Technology Management Reform Act of 1996."

According to Representative Gerry Connolly (D-VA), the ranking member of the House Committee on Oversight and Government Reform and co-sponsor of the bill, "there are more than 250 identified CIOs in the federal government, yet none possess the necessary authority to effectively manage IT investments" which has "resulted in duplicative and wasteful IT spending."

Information Week reports that the bill could "save the federal government as much as $2 billion annually by changing wasteful buying practices." It would do this by "eliminating unused and underused software licenses and eradicating noncompliant software that incurs financial penalties for the federal government." According to Tom Schatz, president of Citizens Against Government Waste, "Section 301 of FITARA requires federal agencies to optimize their software licenses by knowing the software licensing requirements of their workforce prior to purchasing or renewing licenses, thus avoiding overpaying for software licenses they do not need or being subject to penalties for using more software licenses than they purchased."

== Provisions adopted within the NDAA ==
Title VIII of the National Defense Authorization Act for FY 2015 contains a Subtitle D entitled "Federal Information Technology Acquisition Reform" and commonly referred to as FITARA (although it is not a stand-alone Act). Within that Subtitle

- Sec. 831 requires specified federal agencies to ensure that the Chief Information Officer (CIO) of the agencies has specified authorities and responsibilities in planning, programming, budgeting, and executing processes related to information technology.
- Sec. 832 requires the Office of Management and Budget (OMB) to make the cost, schedule, and performance data of specified information technology investments publicly available. Requires the CIO of each agency to categorize the investments according to risk and review those that have a high level of risk.
- Sec. 833 requires OMB to implement a process to assist specified agencies in reviewing their portfolio of information technology investments, including the development of standardized cost savings and cost avoidance metrics and performance indicators. Requires the CIO of each agency to conduct an annual review of the information technology portfolio and requires the Administrator of the Office of Electronic Government to submit a quarterly report to Congress identifying cost savings and reductions in duplicative investments identified by the review.
- Sec. 834 provides for the consolidation of federal data centers.
- Sec. 835 requires OMB to work with federal agencies to update their acquisition human capital plans to address how the agencies are meeting their human capital requirements to support the timely and effective acquisition of information technology.
- Sec. 836 directs OMB to prescribe regulations requiring a comparative value analysis to be included in the contract file when the federal government purchases services and supplies offered under the Federal Strategic Sourcing Initiative from sources outside the Initiative.
- Sec. 837 requires the General Services Administration to develop a strategic sourcing initiative to enhance government-wide acquisitions, shared use, and dissemination of software, as well as compliance with end use license agreements.

== Effects ==
OMB published guidance to U.S. federal agencies on how to respond to the law in OMB Memorandum M-15-14: Management and Oversight of Federal Information Technology. The OMB memo also related FITARA's requirements to those of the Clinger-Cohen Act of 1996 and the E-Government Act of 2002

== See also ==
- List of bills in the 113th United States Congress
