= Cost Accounting Standards =

Cost Accounting Standards (popularly known as CAS) are a set of 19 standards and rules promulgated by the United States Government for use in determining costs on negotiated procurements. CAS differs from the Federal Acquisition Regulation (FAR) in that FAR applies to substantially all contractors, whereas CAS applies primarily to the larger ones.

== History ==
In 1970, Congress established the original Cost Accounting Standards Board (CASB) to promulgate cost accounting standards designed to achieve uniformity and consistency in the cost accounting principles followed by defense contractors and subcontractors in excess of $100,000, and to establish regulations to require defense contractors and subcontractors, as a condition of contracting, to disclose in writing their cost accounting practices, to follow the disclosed practices consistently and to comply with promulgated cost accounting standards.

After adopting 19 standards, the original CASB was dissolved on September 30, 1980; the standards, however, remained active and the CASB was revived in 1988 within the Office of Federal Procurement Policy (OFPP). The current CASB consists of five members: the OFPP Administrator (who serves as Chairman) and one member from the United States Department of Defense (this position is held by the Director of the Defense Contract Audit Agency), the General Services Administration, industry, and the private sector.

== The Standards ==
The original CASB adopted 19 standards for commercial enterprises, numbered 401 through 420 (419 was never assigned). The new CASB readopted the original 19 Standards with only minor modifications, has yet to adopt any new standards, and in 2026 (see below) has rescinded four Standards (with a fifth to be rescinded).

Standard	Title
401	Consistency in Estimating, Accumulating and Reporting Cost
402	Consistency in Allocating Costs Incurred for the Same Purpose
403	Allocation of Home Office Expenses to Segments
404(*)	Capitalization of Tangible Assets
405	Accounting for Unallowable Costs
406	Cost Accounting Period
407(^)	Use of Standard Costs for Direct Material and Direct Labor
408(*)	Accounting for Costs of Compensated Personal Absence
409(*)	Depreciation of Tangible Capital Assets
410	Allocation of Business Unit General and Administrative Expenses to Final Cost Objectives
411(*)	Accounting for Acquisition Costs of Material
412	Composition and Measurement of Pension Costs
413	Adjustment and Allocation of Pension Cost
414	Cost of Money as an Element of the Cost of Facilities Capital
415	Accounting for the Cost of Deferred Compensation
416	Accounting for Insurance Cost
417	Cost of Money as an Element of the Cost of Capital Assets Under Construction
418	Allocation of Direct and Indirect Costs
419	unused
420	Accounting for Independent Research and Development Costs and Bid and Proposal Costs (IR&D and B&P)

- (*) rescinded by Office of Federal Procurement Policy (OFPP) Final Rule, with an effective date of August 7, 2026.
- (^) rescinded by Office of Federal Procurement Policy (OFPP) Final Rule, with an effective date of October 1, 2026.

In addition, the original CASB adopted four standards for educational institutions. The Standards were numbered 501, 502, 505, and 506, with the same titles as their commercial counterparts. The new CASB has not made any changes (additions or deletions) to these Standards.

=== 2026 Changes ===
Though not required by the 2026 NDAA, as a result of the legislation (and Executive Orders calling for increased competition in the defense industry), the Office of Federal Procurement Policy has rescinded five of the original Standards, with only certain portions relocated to other Standards.

OFPP issued a Final Rule, effective August 7, 2026, which rescinded four of the standards, as follows:

- CAS 404 was rescinded except for one provision related to making gains or losses, as a result of a merger or acquisition, unallowable; that provision was moved to a new section under CAS 405.
- CAS 408 was rescinded in its entirety; in those instances where the change would have otherwise required a "cost impact statement" (required in some instances when a contractor either must, or has chosen to, make an accounting practice change), the Final Rule waived the requirement.
- CAS 409 was rescinded except for three provisions related to 1) requiring gains and losses to be measured consistent with depreciation, 2) prohibiting gains and losses to be claimed on assets transferred in other than arms-length transactions that are subsequently disposed within one year, and 3) allowing the parties to negotiate a shorter service life than would otherwise be allowed in special circumstances; those provisions were moved to new sections under CAS 405.
- CAS 411 was rescinded in its entirety.

OFPP issued another final rule, effective October 1, 2026, which rescinded CAS 407 except for the following:

- The definition of "actual cost" was revised to conform with the definition already within CAS 401.
- The definition of "production unit", along with certain "Techniques for Application" and "Illustrations" pertaining to standard costing, were relocated to the same sub-sections within CAS 418.

== CAS Applicability ==
CAS applies to contracts, not contractors, through Federal Acquisition Regulation clauses. A company may have contracts that are subject to "full" CAS coverage (be required to follow all 19 standards), "modified" CAS coverage (required to follow only Standards 401, 402, 405, and 406), simultaneously have contracts that are subject to either modified or full coverage, or be exempt from coverage. However, a company under "full" coverage is not subject to a standard where it does not apply (e.g., a company which does have a defined benefit pension plan does not have to comply with CAS 412 or 413).

Under current CAS rules, CAS coverage is as follows:

- "Full" coverage applies when a company receives a single negotiated contract (not otherwise exempt) of US$100 million or more in the current accounting period, or, in the preceding cost accounting period, multiple CAS-covered contracts cumulatively totaling US$100 million. In addition to complying with all 19 standards (where applicable), the company must also file a CAS Disclosure Statement, which spells out the company's accounting practices (such as if certain costs are treated as direct contract charges or as part of overhead expense).
  - There are two versions of the CAS Disclosure Statement: DS-1 applies to commercial companies while DS-2 applies to educational institutions.
- "Modified" coverage applies to contracts when a company receives a single negotiated contract (not otherwise exempt) of US$35 million or more, but less than $100 million. (Prior rules calling for a "trigger" contract were rescinded.)
- A special rule applies to contracts awarded to foreign concerns (not foreign governments): only CAS 401 and 402 apply.

In some instances, a contract (including subcontracts) is exempt from CAS standards:

- All contracts <= $35M, regardless of contract type or how the contract was awarded (competitively or sole-source)
- Contracts awarded to small businesses
- Contracts awarded under sealed bid procedures
- Contracts awarded to foreign governments
- Contracts for commercial items
- Firm-fixed-price contracts (or line items) based on "adequate price competition"
- Contracts where the price is set by law or regulation
- Subcontracts under the NATO PHM Ship Program, where all work will be performed outside the United States

Furthermore, in some instances even where a company is subject to a standard, different rules may apply within the standard itself as to what a company is required to do. As an example, under CAS 403, if Company A's "residual expenses" (defined as those expenses incurred by the home office – usually the corporate office – which cannot be identified to a specific contract, group of contracts, or company segment) exceed a specified percentage of revenue, Company A must follow a dictated "three-factor" formula to allocate such expenses, but if Company B's residual expenses do not exceed the percentage (even if, in dollar terms, they are greater), Company B may follow the formula but is not required to do so.

== Related links ==
- History of CAS and rules
- ICWAI.org
- Common Cost Reporting
- CASBICWAI
