= Simplified Acquisition Procedures =

Simplified Acquisition Procedures (SAP) are a set of streamlined procedures for government procurement in the United States that reduce the administrative burden of awarding procurements below a value known as the simplified acquisition threshold, which, as of 2023, is $250,000. The procedures are described in 48 CFR 13.

== Procedure ==
SAP allows informal quoting and competition procedures for simple, small-dollar-value purchases. For example, quotes may be submitted in oral rather than written form, and quoted prices may be directly compared by contracting officers rather than by conducting negotiations. Items commonly purchased through this program include "office supplies, computer software, and grounds keeping services". Also, the winner may be chosen directly by a contracting officer rather than a source selection team. SAP purchases between the micro-purchase threshold and the SAT threshold must be set aside for small businesses. Acquisitions under SAT/SAP can be sole-sourced under certain thresholds and are often not publicly posted. Additionally, over 100 regulations were made inapplicable to SAP purchases, as these provided a large barrier to entry for new vendors.

As of 2023, the threshold for SAP is $250,000; acquisitions under this amount must use SAP, with certain exceptions. The procedures may also be used for certain commercially available items acquisitions that do not exceed a higher threshold of $7 million, although these purchases require extra scrutiny including performing market research. For the Department of Defense the threshold is higher for acquisitions "to support a contingency operation or defense against or recovery from nuclear, biological, chemical, or radiological attack". Below the micro-purchase threshold, generally $10,000, purchases may be awarded in the absence of competitive quotes "if the contracting officer or designated official considers the price to be reasonable", and use of a Government Purchase Card is preferred.

== History ==
SAP was authorized by the Federal Acquisition Streamlining Act of 1994 (FASA), and expanded by the Federal Acquisition Reform Act of 1996. The procedures were developed in the context of the National Partnership for Reinventing Government, an initiative of the Clinton administration to increase government efficiency that began in 1993. This was part of a push to reduce costs and development time by favoring commercially available products instead of ones custom-designed to unique specifications. Vice President Al Gore had advocated for acquisition reform by appearing on the Late Show with David Letterman and smashed a government-acquired ashtray to demonstrate a regulation that glass ashtrays must not break into more than 35 shards of glass when broken over a maple plank.

SAP funding has grown even while total federal contracting expenditures have fallen, hitting a 10-year peak in 2016. As part of the National Defense Authorization Act for Fiscal Year 2017, the Department of Defense's ability to use SAP was expanded.
