= Source selection criteria =

Source selection criteria describes properties that are crucial for a purchaser when deciding on a supplier. Criteria can be subjective or objective. Individual judgment can be biased, which may require balancing with objective measures. One approach is to identify a list of criteria such as cost and financial stability, assign a weight to each one and to score each vendor on each criterion. Then multiply the score by the weight and sum to get a final score.

== Criteria ==
Criteria can be specific to the desired item(s). Sample criteria:

- Total costs (including works and maintenance)
- Ability to finance
- Capability for technical matters
- The distribution of risks
- The shape of business
- Previous works and references
- Providing Warranty

== See also ==
- Vendor bid analysis
- Stock selection criterion
- Government procurement in the United States
