= Armed Services Procurement Act =

In the United States the Armed Services Procurement Act established the Armed Services Procurement Regulations (ASPR) which were in effect from 1948 to 1978. The first complete ASPR was published by the Department of Defense in 1959. The law was a centerpiece of government procurement.

== See also ==
- Federal Acquisition Regulation
- Title 48 of the Code of Federal Regulations
- Office of Federal Procurement Policy
