= Federal Property and Administrative Services Act of 1949 =

- Long title: An Act to simplify the procurement, utilization, and disposal of Government property, to reorganize certain agencies of the Government, and for other purposes.
- Acronyms (colloquial): FPASA
- Enacted by: the 81st United States Congress
- Effective: July 1, 1949

Citations
- Public law: 81-152
- Statutes at Large: 63 Stat. 377

Codification
- Titles amended: 40 U.S.C.: Public Buildings, Properties, and Public Works
- U.S.C. sections created: 40 U.S.C. ch. 1 § 101 et seq.

Legislative history
- Introduced in the House as H.R. 4754 by Chester E. Holifield (D-CA) on May 18, 1949; Passed the House on June 8, 1949 (Passed); Passed the Senate on June 21, 1949 (Passed); Signed into law by President Harry S. Truman on June 30, 1949

The Federal Property and Administrative Services Act of 1949 is the United States federal law which established the General Services Administration (GSA). The act also provides for various Federal Standards to be published by the GSA. Among these is Federal Standard 1037C, a comprehensive source of definitions of terms used in telecommunications.

The War Assets Administration was abolished by the Act, and its functions taken over by the GSA.

== Titles ==
The Federal Property and Administrative Services Act of 1949 is divided into seven titles:

- I—Organization
- II—Property Management
- III—Procurement Procedure
- IV—Foreign Excess Property
- VI—General Provisions
- VIII—Urban Land Utilitization
- IX—Selection of Architects and Engineers

== Title I ==
Title I designates the establishment of the agency known as the General Services Administration, and its leadership in a general context, and abolishes the Federal Works Agency and the Bureau of Federal Supply (part of the Treasury Department), transferring their duties to the GSA. Title I also outlines guidelines for establishment of the General Supply Fund and the Information Technology Fund. Additionally, it authorizes the establishment of a nationwide network of Federal Information Centers.

== Title II ==
Title II outlines responsibility for procurements subject to the Office of Federal Procurement Policy Act. This includes assets and or services such as storage, property identification, and transportation as well as policy for utilization, disposal, transfer or disposition, regulation, standardization, and cataloging of those assets and services.

Also listed are applicability of antitrust regulation, employment of personnel, penalties for nonconformity, operation of buildings and activities, and a requirement to report to Congress (section 210).

== Title III: Procurement Procedure ==
Title III (sections 301-310) outlines policies for the application of federal procurement and methods for acquisition procedures, electronic commerce capability, competition, solicitation of services, evaluation, and validation of proprietary data. Additionally, regulation of interaction between contracting agencies and the GSA is detailed here.

Section 302(b) states the "declared policy" of the United States, that "a fair proportion of the total purchases and contracts for supplies and services [should be placed] with small business concerns". 41 U.S. Code § 3104 now reads

It is the policy of Congress that a fair proportion of the total purchases and contracts for property and services for the Federal Government shall be placed with small business concerns.

== Title V ==
Title V of this act superseded and repealed the Federal Records Act of 1950.

== Title VI ==
Title VI outlines policy for application of existing procedures and repeals many acts as listed in the text.

Also noted are regulations for separation and guidelines against sexual discrimination in the GSA.

== Title VII ==
Repealed Public Law 91-466, 84 Stat. 990 as of January 1, 1971.

== Title VIII ==
Title VIII establishes guidelines for the use and disposal of urban lands including acquisition, and change of use. Also of note is the Waiver During National Emergency (Sect 805 [40 U.S.C. 534]) which allows the temporary suspension of these guidelines during a period of national emergency as declared by the President of the United States of America.

== Title IX ==
Title IX covers policy and guidelines for the selection and acquisition of engineering and architectural services.

== Amendments ==
- Public Law 90-461 - An Act to amend section 508(f) of the Federal Property and Administrative Services Act of 1949 to extend for a period of five years the authorization to make appropriations for allocations and grants for the collection and publication of documentary sources significant to the history of the United States, approved August 8, 1968.
- Public Law 90-626 - An Act to amend the Federal Property and Administrative Services Act of 1949, as amended, to authorize the rendering of direct assistance to and performance of special services for the Inaugural Committee, approved October 22, 1968.
