= Multisourcing =

Multisourcing is the concept of working with multiple suppliers who are also competitors. Large-scale buyers, such as the U.S. federal government, may want to feel assured that there is more than one supplier for an item.

It has been described as the opposite of "one neck to wring". The opposite is called sole-source.

Intel, a large corporation, was not "enough" for the x86, and so others such as Advanced Micro Devices and Cyrix were needed.

== Models ==
There are two primary models for multisourcing: Prime Contractor and Client models:

=== Prime Contractor model ===
A Prime Contractor may use subcontractors. Either way, the client has "one neck to wring".

=== Client model ===
The client is the system integrator. Multiple outside sources, each with their own "perceived core competencies", provide services. This does not preclude the outside suppliers from further subcontracting.

== Sole sourcing ==
Although "no-bid contracts are illegal under European Union procurement law", "there are exclusions and exceptions" in the UK's rules, and "U.S. law permits .. sole source contracts under specified circumstances". The US Government raised concerns in 2009 about "excessive reliance" on sole-source contracting and use of "contracts with a limited number of sources".

The assurance that the identical and in some cases, certifiably equivalent, item is available seems to defy a statement that "[t]here is no optimization achieved through working with a single provider", especially when "sustainable" capabilities exist.

=== Cost plus and other arrangements ===
Both the much-disputed Iraq reconstruction no-bid contracts and those awarded after Hurricane Katrina contained "cost-plus" provisions which "guarantee contractors a certain profit regardless of how much they ultimately spend", according to the Wall Street Journal. Critics claim that such agreements "remove any incentives for private companies to control expenses, which are paid for by the tax-payer".

A no-bid contract is a military or government contract that is made directly with a corporation, bypassing the standard process of bidding. These contracts can be made much more quickly than a typical contract; however they are often fraught with suspicion. After the 2003 war in Iraq, the Halliburton company, previously headed by then vice-president Dick Cheney, was issued a $2 billion no-bid contract for fuel distribution. Speed is usually the rationale for such contracts.

Just days after Hurricane Katrina, in September, 2005, the Bush administration awarded no-bid reconstruction contracts to companies such as Fluor Corp., Bechtel, Shaw Group, CH2M Hill Cos, and Halliburton's Kellogg, Brown and Root.

== History ==
Although it was recently defined, multisourcing has been practiced in the market since competitors started to produce alternatives to IBM's datacenter products in the late 1980's. Firms like Gartner and Forrester Research pushed the term into the public eye.

== Future ==
Multisourcing's strength, first recognized by Gartner Group in 2005, is to continue providing disciplined services via a blend from internal and external sources.

In workshops, providers are taken through business scenarios to confirm details like method, data content and timescales for each cross-provider interaction. The outputs of these workshops are operational level agreements (OLAs) which are signed and agreed upon by all providers to maximize performances and ensure that everyone is aware of the requirements of their job.

== See also ==
- Campaign finance
- Cronyism
- Defense Contract Management Agency
- Federal Acquisition Regulation
- Government procurement in the United States
- second source
- supply chain diversification
