= Defense Contract Audit Agency =

American Dept of Defense auditing agency

Agency overview
- Formed: January 8, 1965; 61 years ago
- Jurisdiction: United States
- Headquarters: Fort Belvoir, Virginia; 38.719737°N 77.154582°W
- Employees: 4,367 (FY 2020)
- Annual budget: Approximately $650 million
- Parent department: Department of Defense
- Parent agency: Under Secretary of Defense (Comptroller)
- Website: www.dcaa.mil

The Defense Contract Audit Agency (DCAA) is an agency of the United States Department of Defense under the direction of the Under Secretary of Defense (Comptroller). It was established in 1965 to perform all contract audits for the Department of Defense. Previously, the various branches of military service were responsible for their own contract audits. The DCAA's duties include financial and accounting advisory services for the Department of Defense in connection with negotiation, administration and settlement of contracts and subcontracts.

== Early history ==
The Defense Contract Audit Agency was established on January 8, 1965. Previously, the various branches of the military were responsible for their own contract audits and there was little consistency in contract administration and auditing.

The first efforts to perform joint audits began with the U.S. Navy and Army Air Corps in 1939. Audit coordination committees were formed by the Navy and Army Air Corps in December 1942 for contracts involving more than one service branch. A single contract audit manual was issued on June 18, 1952, serving the three military service branches existing at that time. However, writing standard guidelines was difficult, due to differences in the organization and practice of procurement between the services.

Defense contract audits became the responsibility of a single agency, the DCAA, in response to a feasibility study directed by Secretary of Defense Robert S. McNamara in 1962. William B. Petty, former Deputy Comptroller of the U.S. Air Force, was appointed in 1965 as the new agency's director and Edward T. Cook, former Director of Contract Audit for the Navy, was selected as the deputy director.

== Recent history ==
As of September 30, 2013, the Defense Contract Audit Agency had 4,933 employees, located at more than 300 offices throughout the United States, Europe, Asia, and in the Pacific. This workforce consisted of 4,334 auditors and 599 support staff.

The Agency provides standardized contract audit services for the Department of Defense, as well as accounting and financial advisory services regarding contracts and subcontracts to all DoD components responsible for procurement and contract administration. DCAA Contract Audit Manual requires its audit staff to conform to zero-based budgeting in the performance of its audits. In practice, this requires the audit team to account for its time spent performing audits. These services are provided in connection with negotiation, administration, and settlement of contracts and subcontracts. DCAA does not provide consulting and advisory services to contractors due to independence requirements.

Prior to 2015, DCAA also provided contract audit services to other government agencies, as well as other countries under the Foreign Military Sales (FMS) program, on a reimbursable basis. The largest non-DoD agency for which DCAA performed audits was NASA—primarily since the same government contractors do substantial business with both DoD and NASA, especially on major programs. However, Congress banned DCAA from performing non-Defense audits in the National Defense Authorization Act for Fiscal Year 2016.

=== Agency structure ===
DCAA's organizational structure consists of four Corporate Audit Directorates organized by major contractors, three geographical regions primarily focused on other large, mid-sized, and small contractors, and a Field Detachment focused on contracts/contractors involved in classified effort. DCAA has about 300 offices located throughout the United States, Europe, and the Middle East. With the exception of Field Detachment and supervisory positions, DCAA employees are represented by American Federation of Government Employees Union (AFGE).

- Headquarters is at Fort Belvoir, Virginia. Principal elements are the Director, Deputy Director, General Counsel, Office of Inspector General, and the Assistant Directors for Operations, Policy and Plans, Integrity and Quality Assurance, and Human Capital and Resource Management.
- Regional Offices/Field Detachment are located in Smyrna, Georgia (Eastern); Irving, Texas (Central); La Palma, California (Western); and Reston, Virginia (Field Detachment). Each region directs and administers the DCAA audit mission at locations near the contractor base.
- Corporate Audit Directorates (CAD) are located in Lowell, Massachusetts (Raytheon, General Dynamics); McLean, Virginia (Northrop Grumman); Hazelwood, Missouri (Boeing); and Fort Worth, Texas (Lockheed Martin and BAE). Each CAD directs and administers the DCAA mission at its major defense contractors.
- Branch Offices are strategically situated within the regions and are responsible for the majority of contract audit services within their assigned geographical areas. Branch offices often have smaller suboffices to ensure adequate audit coverage, to handle either a specific geographic area or a contractor not large enough to justify its own resident office.
- Resident offices are established at specific contractor locations of both regions and CADs where the audit workload justifies the assignment of a permanent staff of auditors and support staff. These offices allow auditors to work on location with the largest major defense contractors having the most significant military programs.
- DCAA liaison activities are conducted at DoD acquisition or contract administration offices to directly communicate and coordinate audit processes.

The DCAA also operates the Defense Contract Audit Institute (DCAI), located in Sandy Springs, Georgia. Its teaching staff maintain a library of self-study courses as well as providing seminars by live instructors to meet the training requirements of DCAA employees. On a limited basis, the institute also provides training for other government agencies and foreign military employees.

=== Defense contract audits ===
Defense contract audits are required to be performed in accordance with Government Auditing Standards. These standards, commonly referred to as the "Yellow Book", are published by the Comptroller General of the United States. Policies and guidelines more specific to defense contract auditing are detailed in the Defense Contract Audit Manual, a continuously updated online publication of the DCAA.

The objective of a contract audit is to express an opinion, in the form of an auditor's report, on a contractor's cost estimates or cost claims, depending on the type of contract. This involves evaluation of the contractor's policies, procedures and other internal controls over contract costs, and examining samples of supporting records for individual transactions. Government Auditing Standards require the contract auditor to maintain strict independence during audits, avoiding relationships and situations that would look questionable to third parties.

A primary function of the DCAA is conducting Truth in Negotiations (TiN) audits, also known as post-award audits. These audits check for defective pricing, which occurs when a contractor fails to disclose accurate or complete cost data during negotiations as required by the Truth in Negotiations Act. If a violation is found, the government is entitled to a price reduction plus interest and potential penalties.

=== Contractor responsibility ===
The Federal Acquisition Regulations (FAR) assign responsibility to the contractor for maintaining sufficient records to support claimed costs. FAR 31.201-2(d) requires the contractor to keep "records, including supporting documentation, adequate to demonstrate that costs claimed have been incurred, are allocable to the contract, and comply with applicable cost principles". The same FAR provision allows a government agency's contracting officer to "disallow all or part of a claimed cost that is inadequately supported."

A major area of emphasis in a DCAA audit is determining the adequacy and reliability of the contractor's records to prove the accuracy and reasonableness of contract costs. FAR 4.703(a) requires contractors to "make available records, which includes books, documents, employee time & attendance records, accounting procedures and practices, and other data ... to satisfy contract negotiation, administration, and audit requirements".

== 2008 allegations ==
In 2008 the DCAA received allegations of intimidation, retaliation, lax oversight, and poor performance. A report released by the Government Accountability Office (GAO) on July 23, 2008, alleged that DCAA managers threatened a senior auditor with personnel action if he did not remove negative findings from a report criticizing a large federal contractor. The report found a too-cozy relationship between management at the DCAA and some of the contractors they are assigned to audit, including Boeing. GAO also said auditors who complied with the investigation were subject to harassment and intimidation from their supervisors.

The DCAA responded on July 25 that it had asked the US Department of Defense's (DoD) Inspector General (IG) office to investigate the GAO's claims. "We take the GAO report very seriously," said April Stephenson, DCAA's director. US Senator Claire McCaskill said GAO may have uncovered the "biggest auditing scandal in the history of this town," and asked the DoD to immediately fire the supervisors cited in the report.

An Associated Press report on November 10, 2008, revealed that DCAA challenged $4.6 billion, or only 1.2 percent, of the contracts it audited as lacking necessary documentation. The agency has not used its subpoena authority in over 20 years to produce the required paperwork from defense contractors under audit. According to the Associated Press, in contrast to the GAO, which saves taxpayers $94 for every dollar it spends, DCAA's return on investment is only $7. As an example, the Associated Press reported that a May 2008 audit of Bechtel Group, supervised by DCAA regional director Christopher Andrezze, showed a "chronic failure" by Bechtel to produce the required documentation for the audit. In spite of this, DCAA issued a report rating Bechtel's internal accounting procedures as "adequate," a passing grade which meant DoD auditors could ease up on the company. The DCAA report did not mention the company's failure to produce the required documentation.

A Government Accountability Office (GAO) report in September 2009 found that agency auditors failed to follow "basic auditing standards" in 65 of 69 audits. In its report, the GAO noted that the agency lacks sufficient independence from the contractors and the DoD agencies doing business with those contractors. The GAO concluded that pressure from outside groups creates a hostile work environment in which audit reports are falsified to appease contractors. In response to the GAO report, Senator Joe Lieberman said, "Perhaps it's time for us to consider separating DCAA from the Department of Defense and … making it an independent auditing agency."

The DoD IG released a report of its investigation into the agency on August 31, 2009. It found that the DCAA has an "environment not conducive to performing quality audits." An audit of Boeing was cited in which the company was allowed to keep $217 million in taxpayer's money, because a DCAA regional auditor did not perform his/her duties properly. When Boeing was unresponsive to a request for information, the regional auditor ordered a subordinate to change the audit report in Boeing's favor. Said Senator Tom Coburn about the agency in response to the report, "It's atrocious. Several of those people ought to be fired." Added Senator Claire McCaskill, "This report is just further confirmation that DCAA is fundamentally broken. I certainly hope the Department of Defense takes these accusations seriously. As I said before, if somebody is not held accountable for the shoddy audits the DCAA has produced, nobody should take this agency or their work seriously in the future." DCAA director Stephenson stated in the IG report that her agency concurred with the IG's recommendations.

In the wake of the investigations, Stephenson was removed from her position as director of the agency by DoD comptroller Robert Hale and reassigned to Hale's staff effective November 9, 2009. She was replaced by Patrick Fitzgerald, previously the Auditor General of the United States Army Audit Agency.

== See also ==
- Allegations of misappropriations related to the Iraq War
