= Contract adjustment board =

In government contracting, a Contract Adjustment Board is a department board at the Secretariat level in the U.S. Government that deals with disputes and requests for extraordinary relief under Public Law 85-804 of Aug. 28, 1958.

In brief:

Public Law No. 85-804, codified at 50 U.S.C. § 1431-35 (Supp. IV 1998), grants to the President the authority to authorize any agency which exercises functions in connection with the national defense to enter into contracts or into amendments or modifications of contracts, and to make advance payments, without regard to other applicable legal provisions whenever such action would facilitate the national defense. 50 U.S.C. § 1431. The legislative history of the statute indicates that it may also be used as the basis for making indemnity payments under certain government contracts, the so-called "residual powers. " ECR Current Materials at 1005, 1021. The legislative history explains that "[t]he need for indemnity clauses in most cases arises from the advent of nuclear power and the use of highly volatile fuels in the missile program. The magnitude of the risks involved under procurement contracts in these areas have rendered commercial insurance either unavailable or limited in coverage.

== History ==
During World War I, a "Board of Contract Adjustment" was created to determine "all claims, doubts and disputes which may arise under departmental contracts"; it implemented the policies for Liquidation, Cancellation, and Adjustment of contracts.

According to Evans Reamer Machine Company v. United States. 386 F.2d 873, "since the early days of World War II," the main defense agencies have been authorized to grant discretionary relief to contractors suffering losses on account of mistakes. The underpinning for the granting of relief must be a finding that such action would facilitate the national defense or prosecution of the war. Title II relief has been referred to variously as "far-reaching," "extraordinary," and "a snare and a delusion."

According to U.S. v. Utah Constr. & Mining Co., pursuant to a delegation by the President under Public Law 85—804, government departments and agencies exercising functions in connection with the national defense may, upon a finding that such action would 'facilitate the national defense,' enter into amendments and modifications of contracts without regard to other provisions of law respecting such amendments and modifications. As implemented by the Atomic Energy Commission's procurement regulations, the authority conferred encompasses amendments without consideration, correction of mutual mistakes, and formalization of informal commitments. This authority, which in many respects is analogous to power to settle claims, is delegated to Contract Adjustment Boards established within the departments and agencies concerned separate from the Boards of Contract Appeals. Because the regulations preclude resort to the powers conferred by Public Law 85—804, "unless other legal authority in the Department concerned is deemed to be lacking or inadequate", the Army Contract Adjustment Board has generally required contractors to exhaust remedies before the ASBCA under the disputes clause. Thus it is quite evident from the administration of Public Law 85—804 and its predecessors that the limitations on the jurisdiction of the Boards of Contract Appeals are well understood by the military procurement departments and Congress.

== Examples ==
- The Departments of the Army, Navy, and Air Force each have a contract adjustment board.
- The NASA Contract Adjustment Board considers requests by NASA contractors for equitable contractual relief.
- In the U.S. Department of Transportation, a "Board of Contract Appeals" is responsible for hearings and decisions on appeals from decisions of departmental contracting officers; when sitting as the Contract Adjustment Board it acts on petitions for extraordinary contractual relief under Public Law 85-804.

== See also ==
- Contracting with the United States Government
- Price-Anderson Nuclear Industries Indemnity Act
- Contract Disputes Act of 1978
- Armed Services Board of Contract Appeals
- Civilian Board of Contract Appeals
