= Competition in Contracting Act =

The Competition in Contracting Act (CICA) of 1984, 41 U.S.C. 253, is United States legislation governing the hiring of contractors. It requires U.S. federal government agencies to arrange "full and open competition through the use of competitive procedures" in their procurement activities unless otherwise authorized by law. CICA was passed into law as a foundation for the Federal Acquisition Regulation (FAR) and to foster competition and reduce costs. The theory was that more competition for procurements would reduce costs and allow more small businesses to win Federal Government contracts. Under CICA all procurements must be competed as full and open (there are some exceptions found in FAR Part 6) so that any qualified company can submit an offer. The bidding procedure should take the form of sealed bidding, previously known as "formal advertising", solicited prior to 2001 through Commerce Business Daily.

== History ==
A version of the CICA was introduced in 1982 by Senators William V. Roth Jr., Carl Levin, and William S. Cohen as Senate bill 2127. They chose the phrase "full and open competition" and deliberately avoided the phrase "maximum competition". Deputy Secretary of Defense Frank Carlucci had proposed related steps to reform defense-related (military) acquisition.

The law was passed as part of the Deficit Reduction Act of 1984, P.L. 98-369, §§ 2701–2753, 98 Stat. 1175 (1984), and its competition requirements took effect on April 1, 1984. The law defines a role for GAO to adjudicate "bid protests", which are claims that the government awarded a contract improperly.

== See also ==
- Truth in Negotiations Act (TINA)
