= Federal Acquisition Streamlining Act of 1994 =

United states legal act

The Federal Acquisition Streamlining Act of 1994 (S. 1587; Pub. L. 103–355) is a United States law that was enacted in 1994 with the goal of lowering procurement barriers. This Act enables Simplified Acquisition Procedures where the procurement is limited, facilitates reliance of Commercial off-the-shelf (COTS) technology, and promotes the use of fixed-price Performance Based Contracting.

The law alters the United States government procurement strategy from lowest bid to best value. The Federal Acquisition Streamlining Act and the Federal Acquisition Reform Act of 1996 removed the traditional oversight mechanisms that had been in place for decades and paved the way for a new method of awarding federal government contracts. Contracts must meet 90% of their performance goals or face termination.

== See also ==
- Nunn–McCurdy Amendment
