= Performance work statement =

Summary of contractual work obligations

A Performance work statement (or PWS) is used to summarize the work that needs to be done for a contract (e.g., with the U.S. Department of Defense).

A PWS usually requires a scope, applicable documents, performance requirements/tasks, and contractor quality assurance for acquisition.

== See also ==
- Government procurement in the United States
