= Title 48 of the Code of Federal Regulations =

U.S. federal rules and regulations on government procurement

Title 48 of the Code of Federal Regulations contains regulations concerning government procurement in the United States.

== Structure ==
The Federal Acquisition Regulations (FAR) in chapter 1 are those government-wide acquisition regulations jointly issued by the General Services Administration, the Department of Defense, and the National Aeronautics and Space Administration. Chapters 2-99 are acquisition regulations issued by individual government agencies: parts 1-69 are reserved for agency regulations implementing the FAR in chapter 1 and are numerically keyed to them, and parts 70-99 contain agency regulations supplementing the FAR.

| Volume | Chapter | Parts | Title | Regulatory entity |
|---|---|---|---|---|
| 1 | 1 | 1-51 | Federal Acquisition Regulation (FAR) | General Services Administration, Department of Defense, National Aeronautics and Space Administration, Office of Federal Procurement Policy |
| 2 | 1 | 52-99 | Federal Acquisition Regulation (FAR) | General Services Administration, Department of Defense, National Aeronautics and Space Administration, Office of Federal Procurement Policy |
| 3 | 2 | 200-299 | Defense Acquisition Regulations System (DARS), Defense Federal Acquisition Regulation Supplement (DFARS) | Department of Defense |
| 4 | 3 | 300-399 | Department of Health and Human Services | |
| 4 | 4 | 400-499 | Department of Agriculture | |
| 4 | 5 | 500-599 | General Services Administration | |
| 4 | 6 | 600-699 | Department of State | |
