= Title 40 of the United States Code =

U.S. federal statutes on public properties

Title 40 of the United States Code outlines the role of Public Buildings, Properties, and Public Works in the United States Code.

- Subtitle I—Federal Property and Administrative Services
- Subtitle II—Public Buildings and Works
- Subtitle III—Information Technology Management
- Subtitle IV—Appalachian Regional Development
- Subtitle V—Miscellaneous

== Outline of title 40 ==
Title 40

=== Subtitle I — Federal Property and Administrative Services ===
Subtitle I

- Chapter 1 — General
- Chapter 3 — Organization of General Services Administration
- Chapter 5 — Property management
- Chapter 7 — Foreign excess property
- Chapter 9 — Urban land use
- Chapter 11 — Selection of architects and engineers
- Chapter 13 — Public property

=== Subtitle II — Public Buildings and Works ===
Subtitle II

- Part A — General
  - Chapter 31 — General
  - Chapter 33 — Acquisition, construction, and alteration
  - Chapter 35 — Non-federal public works
  - Chapter 37 — Contract work hours and safety standards
- Part B — United States Capitol
  - Chapter 51 — United States Capitol Buildings and Grounds
- Part C — Federal building complexes
  - Chapter 61 — United States Supreme Court Building and Grounds
  - Chapter 63 — Smithsonian Institution, National Gallery of Art, and John F. Kennedy Center for the Performing Arts
  - Chapter 65 — Thurgood Marshall Federal Judiciary Building
  - Chapter 67 — Pennsylvania Avenue development
  - Chapter 69 — Union Station redevelopment
- Part D — Public buildings, grounds, and parks in the District of Columbia
  - Chapter 81 — Administrative
  - Chapter 83 — Washington Metropolitan Region Development
  - Chapter 85 — National Capital Service Area and Director
  - Chapter 87 — Physical Development of National Capital Region
  - Chapter 89 — National Capital Memorials and Commemorative Works
  - Chapter 91 — Commission of Fine Arts
  - Chapter 93 — Theodore Roosevelt Island
  - Chapter 95 — Washington Aqueduct and other public works in the District of Columbia

=== Subtitle III — Information Technology Management ===
Subtitle III

- Chapter 111 — General
- Chapter 113 — Responsibility for acquisitions of information technology
- Chapter 115 — Information technology acquisition pilot program
- Chapter 117 — Additional information resources management matters

=== Subtitle IV — Appalachian Regional Development ===
Subtitle IV

- Chapter 141 — General provisions
- Chapter 143 — Appalachian regional commission
- Chapter 145 — Special Appalachian programs
- Chapter 147 — Miscellaneous

=== Subtitle V — Regional Economic and Infrastructure Development ===
Subtitle V

- Chapter 151 — General provisions
- Chapter 153 — Regional commissions
- Chapter 155 — Financial assistance
- Chapter 157 — Administrative provisions

=== Subtitle VI — Miscellaneous ===
Subtitle VI

- Chapter 171 — Safety standards for motor vehicles
- Chapter 173 — Government losses in shipment
- Chapter 175 — Federal motor vehicle expenditure control
- Chapter 177 — Alaska communications disposal
- Chapter 179 — Alaska federal-civilian energy efficiency swap
- Chapter 181 — Telecommunications accessibility for hearing-impaired and speech-impaired individuals
- Chapter 183 — National Capital Area interest arbitration standards

== Former chapters ==
In the 1946 Edition of the Code there are nine chapters:

- Chapter 1: Public Buildings, Grounds, Parks and Wharves in the District of Columbia
- Chapter 2: Capitol Building and Grounds
- Chapter 2A: National Archives
- Chapter 3: Public Buildings and Works Generally
  - Section 264 codified the proviso to the last paragraph of section 5 (at 37 Stat 879) of the Act of 4 March 1913, chapter 147, public Act number 432, HR 28766, passed in the third session of the 62nd Congress, sometimes called the Public Buildings Act of 1913, the Public Building Act of 1913, or the Public Building(s) Appropriation Act of 1913.
- Chapter 4: The Public Property
- Chapter 5: Hours of Labor on Public Works
- Chapter 6: Acquisition of Sites for and Construction of Public Buildings
- Chapter 7: Acquisition of Land in District of Columbia for Use of United States by Condemnation Proceedings
- Chapter 8: Emergency Public Works and Construction Projects
