= Insight Global =

American staffing and managed services company

Insight Global, LLC
- Type: Private (LLC)
- Industry: Staffing, managed services, and workforce solutions
- Founded: May 2001; 25 years ago in Atlanta, Georgia, U.S.
- Founders: Glenn Johnson; Scott Madden
- Key people: Bert Bean (CEO); Glenn Johnson (Executive Chairman)
- Services: Information technology, healthcare, accounting, and engineering staffing; managed services (Evergreen)
- Revenue: US$4.5 billion
- Owner: Leonard Green & Partners; Harvest Partners; Crescent Capital Group
- Number of employees: ~4,000 (internal staff)
- Parent: IG True Grit Holdings, LP; IG Staffing Holdings, LLC
- Website: insightglobal.com

Insight Global, LLC is an American staffing and managed services company headquartered in Atlanta, Georgia. Founded in 2001 by former Allegis Group recruiters Glenn Johnson and Scott Madden, the company provides temporary, temporary-to-permanent, and direct-hire contracting personnel across the information technology, healthcare, accounting, finance, and engineering sectors, primarily for Fortune 1000 enterprises.

== History ==
=== Founding and early growth ===
Insight Global, Inc. was incorporated in Georgia in May 2001 by Glenn Johnson and Scott Madden. Prior to founding the firm, both Johnson and Madden worked as recruiters and sales operators within the Allegis Group staffing network, which includes information technology staffing agency TEKsystems and technical staffing agency Aerotek. Originally incorporated as Insight Global, Inc., the company operated as a founder-owned staffing agency until 2007, when it entered a sequence of institutional leveraged buyouts and recapitalizations led by private equity sponsors including H.I.G. Capital, Harvest Partners, Ares Management, and Leonard Green & Partners. Following its late 2012 acquisition by Ares Management, the operating entity was converted into a limited liability company under the Delaware holding company IG Investments Holdings, LLC. Launching during the contraction of the information technology sector following the dot-com bubble, the company initially operated out of Johnson's residence in Atlanta before establishing commercial offices across the Southeastern United States and expanding into North American enterprise markets.

=== Private equity buyouts and LLC conversion ===
Beginning in 2007, Insight Global transitioned from a founder-owned corporation into a private equity portfolio company through a series of secondary leveraged buyouts and debt-financed recapitalizations:

- H.I.G. Capital and Caltius Capital Management: In May 2007, with 14 regional offices in operation, Insight Global, Inc. completed its first institutional recapitalization led by H.I.G. Capital, alongside mezzanine financing provided by Caltius Capital Management.
- Harvest Partners acquisition: On July 1, 2010, New York-based private equity firm Harvest Partners acquired Insight Global from H.I.G. Capital. During this period, the firm incorporated ancillary entities to support multi-state and international operations, including UK subsidiary Global Insights Ltd. in September 2010 and Insight Global (Delaware), Inc. in January 2011.
- Ares Management buyout and LLC conversion: In October 2012, the private equity group of Ares Management (via Ares Corporate Opportunities Fund III) acquired Insight Global from Harvest Partners in a leveraged buyout financed through first- and second-lien institutional term loans issued under parent holding company IG Investments Holdings, LLC. On December 28, 2012, following the close of the Ares transaction, the operating entity filed corporate conversion amendments changing its legal structure from Insight Global, Inc. to Insight Global, LLC.
- Leonard Green & Partners buyout: On April 5, 2016, a consortium led by Leonard Green & Partners, mezzanine lender Crescent Capital Group, and European private equity firm Ardian acquired Insight Global, LLC from Ares Management.
- Dividend recapitalizations and Harvest Partners re-entry: In May 2018, parent entity IG Investments Holdings, LLC issued new first- and second-lien debt to fund a dividend recapitalization for its institutional equity sponsors, maintaining an S&P corporate credit rating of "B" with debt leverage exceeding five times EBITDA. In 2018, co-founder Glenn Johnson stepped down as chief executive officer to become Executive Chairman, and Bert Bean—who joined the company as an entry-level recruiter in 2005—was appointed CEO. In May 2019, Harvest Partners re-entered the ownership group alongside Leonard Green & Partners and Crescent Capital Group. In April 2025, Leonard Green & Partners transferred its equity stake into its Multi-Asset Continuation Fund.

== Operations and corporate model ==
=== Recruiting pipeline and workforce structure ===
Insight Global's internal staffing structure is modeled on the entry-level recruiting-to-sales progression developed by Allegis Group. Rather than hiring lateral recruiting professionals, the company primarily recruits recent college graduates into entry-level "Recruiter" positions responsible for candidate sourcing, cold calling, and interview screening. Employees who meet placement and margin quotas are promoted internally into "Account Manager" (client sales) and regional leadership roles. Academic labor studies examining private equity-backed service enterprises note that high-leverage buyout structures frequently pair standardized entry-level production metrics with variable commission tiers and restrictive post-employment covenants to protect operating margins and service institutional debt.

=== Operating divisions ===
In addition to its core information technology, accounting, finance, and engineering temporary staffing operations, the company operates specialized divisions including:

- Evergreen: A managed services and statement-of-work (SOW) consulting division.
- Insight Global Health: A healthcare staffing and public health contracting division expanded during the COVID-19 pandemic to provide clinical personnel and government contact tracing services.

== Legal and regulatory affairs ==
Insight Global's employment and contracting practices have been the subject of federal labor regulatory actions and precedent-setting litigation, including the 2019 Northern District of California ruling in Barker v. Insight Global, LLC that invalidated employee non-solicitation covenants under California law, a 2018 United States Department of Labor prevailing-wage settlement, and a 2024 False Claims Act settlement with the United States Department of Justice following a 2021 data breach involving COVID-19 contact tracing records for the Pennsylvania Department of Health.

=== Restrictive covenants and non-solicitation litigation ===
Insight Global historically required its internal recruiters, account managers, and executives to sign employment agreements containing post-employment non-competition, customer non-solicitation, and employee non-solicitation covenants, alongside deferred compensation plans containing forfeiture-for-competition clauses. Legal scholars Mark A. Lemley and Orly Lobel have cited such clauses across the staffing and technology sectors as mechanisms that suppress employee mobility and bargaining power.

In 2016, former Insight Global executive John Barker filed suit against the company in the United States District Court for the Northern District of California (Barker v. Insight Global, LLC) after being terminated "for cause"—a classification that stripped him of approximately $344,304 in vested deferred compensation under the company's executive benefit plan—and subsequently threatened with litigation after joining a competing firm. While initially dismissing Barker's challenge to the employee non-solicitation covenant, Judge Edward J. Davila reversed his ruling on January 11, 2019, following the California Court of Appeal's decision in AMN Healthcare, Inc. v. Aya Healthcare Services, Inc. The federal court held that Insight Global's contractual clause prohibiting former employees from recruiting or soliciting current Insight Global employees was an unlawful restraint of trade and void under California Business and Professions Code Section 16600. The Barker ruling became a widely cited federal precedent invalidating employee non-solicitation agreements in California.

=== Wage-and-hour investigations and FLSA litigation ===
In April 2018, the Wage and Hour Division of the United States Department of Labor announced that Insight Global, LLC had agreed to pay $354,978 in back wages to 14 employees located in Atlanta following a federal investigation into violations of the McNamara–O'Hara Service Contract Act and Contract Work Hours and Safety Standards Act. Investigators determined that the company had failed to pay employees the legally required prevailing wage rates and fringe benefits commensurate with the work they actually performed on a federal subcontract, and had failed to maintain accurate payroll records.

In March 2019, a group of former entry-level recruiters filed a federal Fair Labor Standards Act (FLSA) collective action against the company in the United States District Court for the District of Maryland (Willie et al. v. Insight Global, LLC, Case No. 1:19-cv-00801). The complaint alleged that Insight Global systematically misclassified entry-level recruiters as FLSA-exempt administrative employees and instructed them not to record hours worked beyond 40 hours per week, despite requiring them to work 50 to 60 hours per week without overtime compensation. To limit collective litigation exposure among its internal staff and temporary W-2 contractors, Insight Global has also utilized mandatory individual arbitration clauses with class-action waivers, as well as faces occasional Unfair Labor Practice (ULP) filings before the National Labor Relations Board (NLRB) challenging workplace rules under Section 8(a)(1) of the National Labor Relations Act.

=== 2021 Pennsylvania COVID-19 contact tracing data breach and DOJ settlement ===
In July 2020, the Pennsylvania Department of Health awarded Insight Global a one-year contract worth up to $23 million (later increased to $28.7 million) to hire and manage hundreds of contact tracers during the COVID-19 pandemic in Pennsylvania.

In April 2021, investigative reporting by WPXI and Spotlight PA, followed by confirmation from Pennsylvania state officials, revealed that Insight Global employees had created unauthorized, unencrypted Google Docs and spreadsheets without password protection to store and share personal health information gathered during contact tracing calls. The security lapse exposed the names, phone numbers, medical diagnoses, household details, sexual orientations, and COVID-19 exposure histories of approximately 72,000 Pennsylvania residents. Following the disclosure, the administration of Governor Tom Wolf terminated Insight Global's state contract effective July 2021, and affected residents filed multiple federal class-action privacy lawsuits against the company.

On May 2, 2024, the United States Department of Justice announced that Insight Global, LLC had agreed to pay $2.7 million to resolve federal False Claims Act allegations arising from a qui tam whistleblower lawsuit related to the Pennsylvania contract. Federal prosecutors alleged that Insight Global billed the federally funded state contract for cybersecurity and data protection compliance while knowingly failing to safeguard confidential health records on secure computer systems.

== See also ==
- Employment agency
- Allegis Group
- Temporary work
- Private equity in the 21st century
