= Buy American Act (disambiguation) =

Buy American Act, and closely worded terms, can refer to:

- Buy American Act, of 1933
- Buy America Provision, of the Surface Transportation Assistance Act of 1982
- Buy American Provision of the American Recovery and Reinvestment Act of 2009
