= Copeland "Anti-kickback" Act =

1934 United States federal law

- Long title: An Act to effectuate the purpose of certain statutes concerning rates of pay for labor, by making it unlawful to prevent anyone from receiving the compensation contracted for thereunder, and for other purposes
- Enacted by: the 73rd United States Congress
- Effective: June 13, 1934

Citations
- Public law: Pub. L. 73–324
- Statutes at Large: ch. 482, 48 Stat. 948

Legislative history
- Introduced in the Senate as S. 3041 by Royal S. Copeland (D–NY) on April 26, 1934; Passed the Senate on April 26, 1934 (passed); Passed the House of Representatives on June 7, 1934 (passed); Signed into law by President Franklin D. Roosevelt on June 13, 1934

The Copeland "Anti-kickback" Act (Pub. L. 73–324, 48 Stat. 948, enacted June 13, 1934, codified at 18 U.S.C. § 874) is a U.S. labor law and act of Congress that supplemented the Davis–Bacon Act of 1931. It prohibits a federal building contractor or subcontractor from inducing an employee into giving up any part of the compensation that he or she is entitled to under the terms of his or her employment contract. The Copeland Act also incorporated provisions of President Hoover's executive order no. 5778, requiring employers to file weekly compliance reports.

== Background ==
The Copeland Act takes its name from U.S. Senator Royal S. Copeland, its primary sponsor. Copeland's Senate Subcommittee on Crime found that up to 25% of the federal money paid for labor under prevailing wage rates was actually returned by the wage-earner as a kickback to the employing contractor or subcontractor, or to government officials. Copeland proposed the bill, S. 3041, with a brief statement in the Senate on April 26, 1934, and it passed without debate in both the Senate and House of Representatives. It was signed into law by President Franklin D. Roosevelt on June 13, 1934.

== Text ==
The Act is one long sentence as follows:

Whoever, by force, intimidation, or threat of procuring dismissal from employment, or by any other manner whatsoever induces any person employed in the construction, prosecution, completion or repair of any public building, public work, or building or work financed in whole or in part by loans or grants from the United States, to give up any part of the compensation to which he is entitled under his contract of employment, shall be fined under this title or imprisoned not more than five years, or both.

== Operation ==
The Copeland Act is administered by the U.S. Department of Labor. The Department of Labor publishes its applicable regulations in the Code of Federal Regulations, Title 29, Part 3.

The Act originally provided for up to $5000 in fines and up to five years of imprisonment for violations. The Violent Crime Control and Law Enforcement Act of 1994 deleted the amount of the fine, bringing it under the general fine provisions of the federal criminal statutes.

== See also ==
- Anti-Kickback Enforcement Act
