= SCLS =

The acronym SCLS can refer to several things:

In Medicine:

- Capillary leak syndrome a rare medical condition where the number and size of the pores in the capillaries are increased which leads to a leakage of fluid from the blood to the interstitial fluid, resulting in dangerously low blood pressure hypotension, edema and multiple organ failure due to limited perfusion

In Education:

- The South Central Library System a consortium spanning 53 Public Libraries in South Central Wisconsin.

In United States Law:

- Service Contract Labor Standards is a set of labor law regulations for companies receiving federal contracts; see McNamara–O'Hara Service Contract Act.
