= Linoma Software =

- Type: Private
- Industry: Software
- Founded: Omaha, Nebraska, U.S. (1994)
- Headquarters: 11095 Viking Drive; Eden Prairie, MN
- Area served: Worldwide
- Key people: Bob Luebbe (Chief Architect)
- Products: GoAnywhere Director, GoAnywhere Services, GoAnywhere Gateway, Crypto Complete, Surveyor/400, RPG Toolbox, Crypto Studio
- Services: Database Management, Database Encryption, Tokenization, Key Management, Secure Managed File Transfer, Data Transformation
- Parent: Fortra
- Website: Fortra.com; GoAnywhere.com

Linoma Software was a developer of secure managed file transfer and IBM i software solutions. The company was acquired by HelpSystems in June 2016 (HelpSystems changed its name to Fortra in November 2022). Mid-sized companies, large enterprises and government entities use Linoma's (now Fortra's) software products to protect sensitive data and comply with data security regulations such as PCI DSS, HIPAA/HITECH, SOX, GLBA and state privacy laws. Linoma's software runs on a variety of platforms including Windows, Linux, UNIX, IBM i, AIX, Solaris, HP-UX and Mac OS X.

== History ==
Linoma Group, Inc. (the parent company of Linoma Software) was founded in 1994. The company was started in Lincoln, Nebraska by Robert and Christina Luebbe. Throughout most of the 1990s, the Linoma Group performed consulting and contract programming services for organizations in the Nebraska/Iowa area.

Linoma Software was formed in 1998 to address the needs of the IBM AS/400 platform (now known as IBM i) by developing productivity tools to help IT departments and end users. These tools were sold throughout the world and helped Linoma establish itself as an innovative software company.

In 2002, Linoma released Transfer Anywhere, which was a solution for automating and managing file transfers from the AS/400. Over the next 2–3 years, Linoma added encryption capabilities to Transfer Anywhere including support for Open PGP encryption, SFTP and FTPS. These encryption capabilities helped organizations protect sensitive data transmissions such as ACH Network payments, direct deposits, financial data, credit card authorizations, personally identifiable information (PII) and other confidential data.

Linoma expanded into other platforms when it completely redesigned Transfer Anywhere into an open OS solution with a graphical browser-based interface, renaming it GoAnywhere Director. Released in early 2008, GoAnywhere Director included comprehensive security controls, key management, trading partner wizards and detailed audit trails for compliance requirements.

In 2009, Linoma released GoAnywhere Services as a collection of secure file services including an FTP Server, FTPS Server, SFTP Server and HTTPS server.

GoAnywhere Director and Services were merged in 2015 to become GoAnywhere MFT. GoAnywhere MFT merged the workflow automation capabilities (adapted from GoAnywhere Director) with secure FTP server and collaboration features (adapted from GoAnywhere Services). This provides a unified browser-based interface, centralized logging and reporting. GoAnywhere MFT is in the Managed File Transfer software category of products, but can also be used for ETL functions.

GoAnywhere Gateway was released in 2010 as an enhanced reverse proxy to protect the DMZ and help organizations meet strict compliance requirements. GoAnywhere Gateway was enhanced in 2011 to provide forward proxy functions.

Linoma Software also performs encryption of data at rest on the IBM i platform with its Crypto Complete product. This product also includes key management, security controls and audit trails for PCI compliance.

In June 2016, Minneapolis, Minnesota-based HelpSystems acquired Linoma Software.

In March 2019, GoAnywhere MFT, in combination with Clearswift’s ICAP and adaptive redaction product, was named a Security Solution of the Year finalist for the European IT & Software Excellence Awards 2019.

In November 2022, the parent company HelpSystems changed its name to Fortra.

== Certifications ==
- VMware Ready
- Novell Ready for SUSE Linux Enterprise Server
- Works With Windows Server 2008 R2
- IBM Ready for Power Systems Software – IBM Power Systems
- IBM Ready for Systems with Linux - IBM Chiphopper

== Associations ==
- Microsoft Partner
  - Silver Independent Software Vendor (ISV) competency.
  - Silver Application Integration competency.
- IBM Advanced Business Partner
- VMware Elite Partner
- Oracle Partner Network (OPN)
- PCI Security Standards
- COMMON
- Better Business Bureau
- Red Hat ISV Partner
- OpenPGP Alliance
- Apple Developer
- Novell ISV Partner
- GSA Advantage Schedule

== Software ==
=== GoAnywhere MFT ===
GoAnywhere MFT is a managed file transfer solution for the exchange of data between systems, employees, customers and trading partners. It provides a single point of control with security settings, detailed audit trails and reports. Data transfers are secured using protocols for FTP servers (FTPS, SFTP, and SCP) and Web servers (HTTPS and AS2). It supports popular encryption protocols and offers a NIST-certified FIPS 140-2 Validated Encryption module.

GoAnywhere MFT's interface and workflow features help to eliminate the need for custom programs/scripts, single-function tools and manual processes that were traditionally needed. This improves the quality of file transfers and helps organizations to comply with data security policies and regulations.

With integrated support for clustering, GoAnywhere MFT can process high volumes of file transfers for enterprises by load balancing processes across multiple systems. The clustering technology in GoAnywhere MFT also provides active-active automatic failover for disaster recovery.

A secure email module is also available that allows users to send messages and files as secure packages. Recipients receive an email with a unique link to each package that allows them to view or download the files via a secure HTTPS connection. There is no limit on file size or type, and each package can be subject to password protection as well as other security features.

GoAnywhere agents are lightweight applications that automate file transfers and workflows on remote and on-premises systems throughout the enterprise. Agents are managed by a central deployment of GoAnywhere MFT, allowing users to configure and schedule agent file transfers and business processes from the browser-based interface.

For integration with cloud and web applications, GoAnywhere offers Cloud Connectors, built-in integrations that help users automatically move data to and from applications like SharePoint or Salesforce. A designer interface in the software also makes it possible for users to build custom connectors.

=== GoAnywhere Gateway ===
GoAnywhere Gateway provides an additional layer of network security by masquerading server identities when exchanging data with trading partners. The application does not store user credentials or data in the DMZ / local network. When using a reverse proxy, inbound ports do not need to be opened into the private network, which is essential for compliance with PCI DSS, HIPAA, HITECH, SOX, GLBA and state privacy laws. The current version is 2.0.1.

A reverse proxy is used by the application for the file-sharing services (for example, FTP/S, SFTP, HTTP/S servers) it front-ends in the DMZ. GoAnywhere Gateway's service broker binds file transfer requests to the appropriate service in the private network through a secure control channel.

GoAnywhere Gateway makes connections to external systems on behalf of users and applications in the private network. Routing outbound requests through a centralized point helps manage file transfers through a firewall. This method keeps inbound ports closed. The forward proxy hides the identities and locations of internal systems for security purposes.

=== GoAnywhere OpenPGP Studio ===
GoAnywhere OpenPGP Studio is a free desktop tool that protects sensitive files using the OpenPGP encryption standard. Documents can be encrypted, decrypted, signed and verified from a PC or workstation using this tool. An integrated key manager allows users to create, import, export and manage OpenPGP keys needed to encrypt and decrypt files. GoAnywhere OpenPGP Studio will run on almost any operating system including Windows, Linux, Mac OS X, Solaris and UNIX.

=== Crypto Complete ===
Crypto Complete is a program for the IBM i that protects sensitive data using strong encryption, tokenization, integrated key management, and auditing. This software encrypts database fields, can automatically encrypt IFS files.

The application also locates sensitive information that should be encrypted using the FNDDBFLD utility, which is available at no cost to IBM i users. The current version is 3.3.0.

The key management system is integrated within the Crypto Complete policy controls, encryption functions and auditing facilities. Along with the integrated security native to the IBM i, access to key maintenance/usage activities is controlled to help meet compliance requirements.

The backup encryption component encrypts the data written to tape devices. Crypto Complete encrypts the backups of any user data in IBM i libraries, objects, and IFS files.

The field encryption registry works with IBM's Field Procedures and remembers which fields in a database should be encrypted. This process can be automated whenever any data is added to the field. When the data is decrypted, the returned values are masked or displayed based on the authority of the user.

Tokenization is the process of replacing sensitive data with unique identification numbers (tokens) and storing the original data on a central server (typically in encrypted form). Tokenization can help thwart hackers and minimize the scope of compliance audits when it is stored in a single central location. Tokenization is used to protect sensitive data like credit card personal account numbers (PAN), bank account numbers, social security numbers, driver's license numbers and other personally identifiable information (PII).

=== Surveyor/400 ===
A productivity suite for working with IBM i data, files, libraries, and objects. Surveyor/400 operates in a GUI front-end, but provides options for either IBM 5250 or "Command Line" emulation. The current version is 4.0.4.

=== RPG Toolbox ===
RPG Toolbox was developed to help developers upgrade their older RPG and System/36 code to the new RPG IV or OS/400 standard. The program allows developers to save code "snippets" for re-use or testing. The current version is 4.06

== Platforms ==
The GoAnywhere applications are VMware Ready and operate in a virtualized or static environment on the following operating systems.

- Linux
- Novell SUSE Linux Enterprise Server (SLES)
- Red Hat Enterprise Linux
- Unix
- macOS
- Windows
- HP-UX
- Solaris
- IBM System p (AIX)
- IBM i
- IBM Z
- Amazon EC2
- Microsoft Azure
