= Conversica =

Cloud software technology company

- Company type: Private
- Website type: Artificial Intelligence Intelligent Virtual Assistant Enterprise software
- Available in: Multilingual
- Founded: Bellingham, Washington, United States (2007)
- Headquarters: San Mateo, California, United States
- Area served: Worldwide
- Founders: Ben Brigham, Senior Vice President
- Key people: Jim Kaskade, CEO
- Products: Conversica AI Assistants
- Employees: <200
- Website: www.conversica.com
- Registration: Required
- Users: >2000 companies
- Current status: Active

Conversica is a US-based cloud software technology company, headquartered in San Mateo, California, that provides two-way AI-driven conversational software and a suite of Intelligent Virtual Assistants for businesses to engage customers via email, chat, and SMS.

== History ==
2007: The company was founded by Ben Brigham in Bellingham, Washington, originally as AutoFerret.com. The company's initial product was a Customer Relationship Management (CRM) targeted at automotive dealerships. This soon expanded to lead generation, and then lead validation and qualification. The AI Conversica uses currently was made to follow up on and filter out low-quality leads. The focus of the company shifted toward this automated lead engagement technology.

2010: The company started commercially selling AVA, the first Automated Virtual Assistant for sales, and the company name was changed to AVA.ai. Early customers for AVA were automotive dealerships. As the company moved away from generating leads themselves, and providing the CRM themselves, it became necessary to integrate with existing CRM and Marketing Automation platforms, such as DealerSocket, VinSolutions and Salesforce.

2013: The company raised $16m Series A funding, led by Kennet Partners, and named Mark Bradley as CEO. It also moved its headquarters from Bellingham, Washington to Foster City, California.

2014: The company changed its name from AVA.ai to Conversica.

2015: Alex Terry joined Conversica as its CEO. The business expanded to include customers in additional verticals, including technology, education, and financial services.

2016: The company raised $34m Series B funding, led by Providence Strategic Growth.

2017: Conversica expanded its intelligent automation platform and IVAs to support additional communication channels (e-mail and SMS text messaging) and communication languages. Conversica also opened a new technology center in Seattle, Washington to expand its AI and machine learning capabilities.

2018: The company raised $31m Series C funding, led by Providence Strategic Growth. Conversica also acquired Intelligens.ai, providing a regional presence in Latin America with an office in Las Condes, Santiago, Chile. The company launched an AI-powered Admissions Assistant for Higher Education industry.

2019: Conversica was selected by Fast Company magazine as one of the Top 10 Most Innovative AI Companies in the World, and was named Marketo's Technology Partner of the Year. The company officially expanded into the EMEA region with the opening of a London office. As of August 2019, Conversica has over 50 different integrations with third parties. In October Conversica won three awards at the fourth annual Global Annual Achievement Awards for Artificial Intelligence. Also that month, Alex Terry stepped down from his role as CEO and was replaced by Jim Kaskade.

2020: As part of Conversica's response to COVID-19, they optimized the business to become profitable in both 2Q20 and 3Q20, before reinvesting in 4Q20. The company transitioned both international operations in EMEA and LATAM to an indirect model with partners (LeadFabric and Nectia Cloud Solutions respectively), and moved a portion of its US-based employees to near-shore centers in Mexico and Brazil, effectively downsizing the company from 250 to 200. Conversica's reseller partner, Nectia, is a major Latin American affiliate and Chile's number one Salesforce partner, and, as part of the partnership, Nectia devoted capital to a brand new company segment, Predict-IA, dedicated to web-based artificial intelligent solutions. Predict-IA was able to immediately service all LATAM opportunities and clients with Conversica's AI Assistants with end-to-end services (marketing, sales, professional services, customer success, and technical support). Conversica's reseller partner, Leadfabric, has offices in Belgium, Amsterdam, Paris, UK, Taiwan, and Romania.

== Technology ==
Conversica's Revenue Digital Assistants™ are AI assistants who engage with leads, prospects, customers, employees, and other persons of interest (Contacts) in a two-way human-like manner, via email, SMS text, and website chat, in English, French, German, Spanish, Portuguese, and Japanese. The RDAs are built on an Intelligent Automation platform that leverages natural language understanding, natural language processing, natural language generation, deep learning and machine learning. The Assistants are generally deployed alongside sales and marketing, customer success, account management, and higher education admissions teams, as part of an augmented workforce. The Intelligent Automation platform integrates with over 50 external systems, including CRM, Marketing Automation, and other systems of record. A partial st of integration partners includes: Salesforce, Marketo, Oracle, HubSpot, DealerSocket, Reynolds & Reynolds, CDK Global, VinSolutions and many more.
