= Streamlining Claims Processing for Federal Contractor Employees Act =

- Long title: To amend title 40, United States Code, to transfer certain functions from the Government Accountability Office to the Department of Labor relating to the processing of claims for the payment of workers who were not paid appropriate wages under certain provisions of such title.
- Announced in: the 113th United States Congress
- Sponsored by: Rep. Tim Walberg (R, MI-7)
- Number of co-sponsors: 1

Codification
- U.S.C. sections affected: 40 U.S.C. § 3144, 40 U.S.C. § 3144(a)(1), 40 U.S.C. § 3703(b)(3),
- Agencies affected: Government Accountability Office, United States Department of Labor,

Legislative history
- Introduced in the House as H.R. 2747 by Rep. Tim Walberg (R, MI-7) on July 19, 2013; Committee consideration by United States House Committee on Education and the Workforce, United States Senate Committee on Health, Education, Labor, and Pensions; Passed the House on September 10, 2013 (Roll Call 451: 396-10); Passed the Senate on November 5, 2013 (unanimous consent); Signed into law by President Barack Obama on November 21, 2013

The Streamlining Claims Processing for Federal Contractor Employees Act (Pub. L. 113–50 (text) (PDF), 127 Stat. 578, enacted November 21, 2013) was signed into law by President Barack Obama in 2013. It transfers some authority from the Government Accountability Office to the United States Department of Labor in order to streamline the implementation and enforcement of federal contractor wage laws. Previously, the United States Department of Labor was responsible for implementing the Davis–Bacon Act, "which requires that federally-contracted workers be paid the 'local prevailing wage' on government projects, and the Contract Work Hours and Safety Standards Act (CWHSSA), which mandates that federal contractors pay their employees overtime for hours worked in excess of 40 per week." Meanwhile, the Government Accountability Office was responsible for dealing with the claims of workers who did not make the correct wage. This law was designed to improve efficiency by transferring that responsibility to the Department of Labor.

== Background ==
During the 112th United States Congress, identical legislation (H.R. 6371) passed in the House 361-3.

The Davis-Bacon Act requires the federal government to pay the "prevailing wages" of their local area to federal contractors, a policy opposed by some Republicans.

== Provisions of the bill ==
This summary is based largely on the summary provided by the Congressional Research Service, a public domain source.

The Streamlining Claims Processing for Federal Contractor Employees Act would transfer authority from the Government Accountability Office (GAO) to the United States Department of Labor for processing claims for wages due to laborers and mechanics hired by contractors on public works projects.

== Procedural history ==
=== House ===
The Streamlining Claims Processing for Federal Contractor Employees Act was introduced into the House by Rep. Tim Walberg (R, MI-7) on July 19, 2013. It was referred to the United States House Committee on Education and the Workforce. On September 10, 2013, the House voted in Roll Call Vote 451 to pass the bill 396-10.

=== Senate ===
The Streamlining Claims Processing for Federal Contractor Employees Act was received in the United States Senate on September 11, 2013 and referred to the United States Senate Committee on Health, Education, Labor, and Pensions. The bill passed in the Senate on November 5, 2013 by unanimous consent.

=== President ===
The Streamlining Claims Processing for Federal Contractor Employees Act was signed into law by President Barack Obama on November 21, 2013.

== Debate and discussion ==
According to the Republican Conference of the United States House of Representatives, H.R. 2747 would "reduce bureaucracies, redundancies, and ensure timely compensation" for federal contractors.

== See also ==
- List of bills in the 113th United States Congress
- Davis–Bacon Act
- Prevailing wage
