= Vera Security =

Vera is an enterprise data security and information rights management platform that provides encryption and tracks and controls digital information shared across users, devices, applications, and platforms. It offers developers access to its IRM-as-a-service (IRMaaS) platform via a REST API and downloadable software development kit.

== History ==
Vera launched its product in April 2015. Within the first year of operations, Vera announced partnerships with Dropbox, Okta, and Centrify, as well as strategic integrations with Box, VMware, and Microsoft Office. Vera focuses its sales and marketing efforts on large enterprises in industries such as financial services, media & entertainment, manufacturing, and technology sectors.

In 2020, Vera Security was acquired by HelpSystems, now known as Fortra, for an undisclosed sum.

== Awards ==
Vera was nominated as a top 10 finalist for the Innovation Sandbox competition at RSA Conference 2016, and CRN Magazine named Vera one of the "10 Coolest Security Startups of 2015".

== Funding ==
Vera is a privately funded company with $31 million in venture financing. The company announced a $14 million Series A round in November 2014, which included the hiring of Robin Daniels as CMO. In February 2016, Vera announced a $17 million Series B round, led by Sutter Hill Ventures, with participation from existing investors, Battery Ventures, Amplify Partners, and other private investors. In May 2016, Capital One Growth Ventures joined the company's Series B round of financing and founding CEO of Veritas Software, Mark Leslie, joined Vera's board of directors. Roger Lee (Battery Ventures) and Stefan Dyckerhoff (Sutter Hill Ventures) also serve on the company's board.

== Product architecture ==
In March 2016, Vera announced its SDK, which allows developers to add encryption, tracking, policy enforcement, and access control to custom and legacy business applications.
