= Steve Bisciotti =

American businessman and sports team owner (born 1960)

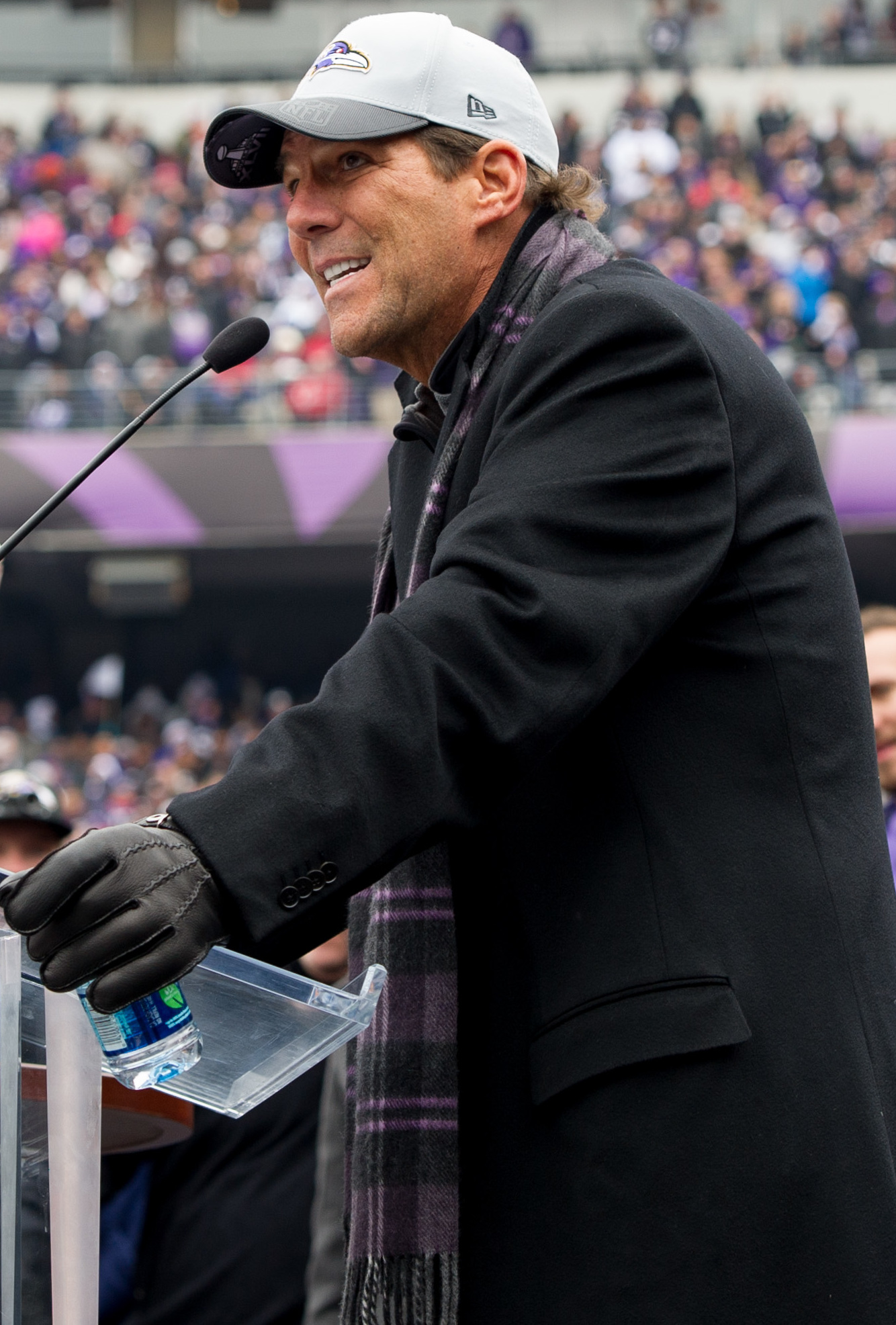
- Bisciotti in 2013
- Born: April 10, 1960 (age 66); Philadelphia, Pennsylvania, U.S.
- Education: Salisbury University
- Occupations: Business executive and owner of the Baltimore Ravens
- Board member of: Associated Catholic Charities; Mother Seton Academy
- Spouse: Renee (Foote) Bisciotti
- Children: 2

Stephen J. Bisciotti (Italian pronunciation: [bіˈʃɔtti]; born April 10, 1960) is an American business executive and the current majority owner of the Baltimore Ravens of the National Football League (NFL). He founded Aerotek, the largest privately owned staffing and recruiting company in the U.S. based in Hanover, Maryland, and co-founded Allegis Group, an international talent management firm headquartered in Hanover, Maryland, that owns Aerotek; TEKsystems; Actalent; MarketSource; Major, Lindsey & Africa; Aston Carter; and Allegis Global Solutions.

== Early life and education ==
Bisciotti was born on April 10, 1960, in Philadelphia, Pennsylvania, the youngest of three children in a middle class Italian-American family. In 1961, his parents, Bernard and Patricia Bisciotti, moved the family to Severna Park, Maryland, a suburb of Baltimore, for his father's job as a construction sales executive.

As a child, Bisciotti often went with his family to Baltimore Orioles and Colts games. When he was 8 years old, his father died of leukemia. After his father's death, his maternal grandfather, C. Gordon Johnston, a retired regional district salesman for Ford Motor Co., supported the family.

Bisciotti attended Severn School but left after two years and transferred to Severna Park High School. In his senior year, he played on the football team, though he has said "I wasn’t much of a high school athlete, but played football, baseball, and basketball all the time when I was growing up".

In 1982, Bisciotti graduated from Salisbury State University in Maryland with a degree in liberal arts. A year later, at 23, he and his cousin Jim Davis started Aerotek, a staffing company in the aerospace and technology sectors. Running the company out of a basement office with secondhand equipment, Bisciotti and Davis produced $1.5 million in sales in the first year. Aerotek grew into the Allegis Group, which is now the largest privately held staffing firm in the world. Bisciotti's involvement in the sports business has brought more attention to his once low-profile company.

== Sports ownership ==
On March 27, 2000, NFL owners approved the sale of 49% of the Ravens to Bisciotti. In the deal, he had an option to purchase the remaining 51% for $325 million in 2004 from Art Modell. The Ravens won Super Bowl XXXV on January 28, 2001. On April 9, 2004, the NFL approved his purchase of the majority stake in the club.

One of the first projects Bisciotti directed as owner of the Ravens was to build the team's state-of-the-art training and practice facility, dubbed "The Castle," which opened in October 2004.

Bisciotti fired Brian Billick after the 2007 season, although Billick's nine years as the Ravens' head coach included the team's win in Super Bowl XXXV. He then selected John Harbaugh as the team's new coach.

In the 2012 season, the Baltimore Ravens capitalized off a 10–6 season to go on to win Super Bowl XLVII against the San Francisco 49ers on February 3, 2013.

In 2005, Bisciotti ranked 378 among the Forbes 400, a list of the richest Americans. The Ravens franchise, as of 2025, has been valued at $6.1 billion.

== Aerotek lawsuit ==
In 2009, Aerotek, the company Bisciotti co-founded, reached a $1.2 million settlement in a class-action lawsuit filed on behalf of more than 1,000 Aerotek workers who worked at a Verizon Internet Services call center in Martinsburg, West Virginia, which was closed in December 2006. The company then was sued to settle claims that the workers were not paid in a timely fashion for accrued personal time and were not paid all of the wages that were due in accordance with the West Virginia Wage Payment and Collection Act and Fair Labor Standards Act, according to Berkeley County Circuit Court records.

== Personal life ==
Bisciotti is Catholic and a board member for the Associated Catholic Charities and Mother Seton Academy. He and his wife Renee (Foote) Bisciotti have two sons. The family lives on the Point Field Landing of the Severn River in Maryland.

Bisciotti owns a $20 million yacht named "Winning Drive" and two Dassault Falcon private jets.

Sporting positions
Preceded by Art Modell	Baltimore Ravens principal owner 2004–present	Incumbent
