= Wage and Hour Division =

Federal office in the United States

Agency overview
- Formed: 1938
- Jurisdiction: United States and its territories
- Headquarters: Washington, D.C.
- Motto: The Wage and Hour mission is to promote and achieve compliance with labor standards to protect and enhance the welfare of the Nation's workforce.
- Employees: 1,700
- Annual budget: $230,100,000
- Agency executive: Andrew Rogers, Administrator
- Website: www.dol.gov/whd

The Wage and Hour Division (WHD) of the United States Department of Labor is the federal office responsible for enforcing federal labor laws. The Division was formed with the enactment of the Fair Labor Standards Act of 1938. The Wage and Hour mission is to promote and achieve compliance with labor standards to protect and enhance the welfare of the Nation's workforce. WHD protects over 144 million workers in more than 9.8 million establishments throughout the United States and its territories. The Wage and Hour Division enforces over 13 laws, most notably the Fair Labor Standards Act and the Family Medical Leave Act. In FY18, WHD recovered $304,000,000 in back wages for over 240,000 workers and followed up FY19, with a record-breaking $322,000,000 for over 300,000 workers.

== History ==
The Wage and Hour Division was created with the enactment of the Fair Labor Standards Act (FLSA) of 1938. The Division is responsible for the administration and enforcement of a wide range of laws which collectively cover virtually all private and State and local government employment. The Division has a nationwide staff of investigators, supervisors, and technical and clerical employees responsible for enforcing FLSA, Government Contracts labor standards statutes, the Migrant and Seasonal Agricultural Worker Protection Act, the Employee Polygraph Protection Act, and the Family and Medical Leave Act. The Immigration Reform and Control Act of 1986 also provided certain additional enforcement responsibilities to be undertaken by the Wage and Hour Division staff.

== Laws administered and enforced ==
- FLSA: The Fair Labor Standards Act (FLSA) is the federal law commonly known for minimum wage, overtime pay, child labor, recordkeeping, and special minimum wage standards applicable to most private and public employees. FLSA provides the agency with civil and criminal remedies, and also includes provisions for individual employees to file private lawsuits. The 1989 Amendments to FLSA added a provision for civil money penalties (CMP) for repeated or willful minimum wage or overtime violations. (Since 1974, FLSA has contained a similar CMP provision for child labor violations.)
- FMLA: the Family and Medical Leave Act (FMLA) entitles eligible employees to 12 weeks of unpaid, job-protected leave for certain family and medical reasons. At the employee's or employer's option, certain kinds of paid leave may be substituted for unpaid leave. Employees are eligible if they have worked for a covered employer for at least one year, and for 1,250 hours over the previous 12 months, and if there are at least 50 employees within 75 miles. The employee may be required to provide advance leave notice and medical certification. For the duration of FMLA leave, the employer must maintain the employee's health coverage under any group health plan. Upon return from FMLA leave, most employees must be restored to their original or equivalent positions with equivalent pay, benefits, and other employment terms.
- Working conditions: The Wage and Hour Division (WHD) is authorized under 29 U.S.C. 207, et seq. to administer and enforce a variety of laws that establish the minimum standards for wages and working conditions in the United States. Collectively, these labor standards cover most private, state, and local government employment. WHD's mission is to “promote and achieve compliance with labor standards to protect and enhance the welfare of the Nation’s workforce.” WHD is instrumental in promoting access to opportunities— opportunities for employers to compete on a level playing field; opportunities for workers to move into the middle class; and opportunities for workers to balance their family and work obligations. WHD has a nationwide staff of investigators, supervisors, analysts, technicians, and administrative employees who share responsibility for enforcing and administering the minimum wage, overtime, child labor, and break time for nursing mothers provisions of the Fair Labor Standards Act (FLSA); the prevailing wage requirements and wage determination provisions of the Davis-Bacon and Related Acts (DBRA) and the McNamara-O’Hara Service Contract Act (SCA); the wages and working conditions under the Migrant and Seasonal Agricultural Worker Protection Act (MSPA); the job protections of the Family and Medical Leave Act (FMLA); and the Employee Polygraph Protection Act (EPPA). WHD also enforces the field sanitation and temporary labor camp standards in agriculture and certain employment standards and worker protections of the Immigration and Nationality Act (INA). These laws protect over 135 million workers in more than 7.3 million establishments throughout the United States and its territories.
- Government contracts: The Government Contracts statutes set labor standards for wages and hours of work for employees who work on contracts with the Federal government. The Davis-Bacon and Related Acts (DBA) & (DBRA) cover workers on Federal construction contracts, and on construction contracts with State and local governments that are Federally financed or assisted, in whole or in part. The McNamara-O'Hara Service Contract Act (SCA) applies to workers on Federal service contracts, and the Walsh-Healey Public Contracts Act (PCA) applies to workers on Federal supply contracts.
- MSPA: The Migrant and Seasonal Agricultural Worker Protection Act (MSPA) sets standards for migrant and seasonal agricultural workers regarding wages, housing, and transportation. MSPA requires that contractors of migrant agricultural workers register with the Federal government, and notify prospective workers of the wages and working conditions before they are hired. MSPA also requires that providers of housing to such workers comply with certain minimum standards for health and safety, and that transportation providers have vehicles that meet certain standards for safety.
- Non-immigrant workers: Wage and Hour has certain responsibilities under the Immigration and Nationality Act (INA). These include enforcement of the labor standards protections for certain temporary nonimmigrant workers admitted to the U.S. under several programs (D-1, Crewmembers; H-1B, Professional and Specialty Occupation Workers; H-1C, Nurses; H-2B Non-Agricultural Workers; and H-2A Agricultural Workers).
- EPPA: The Employee Polygraph Protection Act (EPPA) prohibits most private employers (Federal, State, and local government employers are exempted from the Act) from using any lie detector tests either for pre-employment screening or during the course of employment. Polygraph tests, but no other types of lie detector tests, are permitted under limited circumstances subject to certain restrictions.
- CCPA: The wage garnishment provisions of the Consumer Credit Protection Act (CCPA) protect employees from discharge by their employers because their wages have been garnished for any one debt, and it limits the amount of an employee's earnings that may be garnished in any one week. CCPA also applies to all employers and individuals who receive earnings for personal services (including wages, salaries, commissions, bonuses and income from a pension or retirement program, but ordinarily not including tips).

== Highlights ==
The Wage and Hour Division (WHD) is authorized under 29 U.S.C. 207, et seq. to administer and enforce a variety of laws that establish the minimum standards for wages and working conditions in the United States. Collectively, these labor standards cover most private, state, and local government employment. WHD's mission is to “promote and achieve compliance with labor standards to protect and enhance the welfare of the Nation’s workforce.” WHD is instrumental in promoting access to opportunities— opportunities for employers to compete on a level playing field; opportunities for workers to move into the middle class; and opportunities for workers to balance their family and work obligations. WHD has a nationwide staff of investigators, supervisors, analysts, technicians, and administrative employees who share responsibility for enforcing and administering the minimum wage, overtime, child labor, and break time for nursing mothers provisions of the Fair Labor Standards Act (FLSA); the prevailing wage requirements and wage determination provisions of the Davis-Bacon and Related Acts (DBRA) and the McNamara-O’Hara Service Contract Act (SCA); the wages and working conditions under the Migrant and Seasonal Agricultural Worker Protection Act (MSPA); the job protections of the Family and Medical Leave Act (FMLA); and the Employee Polygraph Protection Act (EPPA). WHD also enforces the field sanitation and temporary labor camp standards in agriculture and certain employment standards and worker protections of the Immigration and Nationality Act (INA). These laws protect over 135 million workers in more than 7.3 million establishments throughout the United States and its territories.

Given the scope of the agency's responsibilities, WHD must make the most of its limited resources by focusing its enforcement and compliance assistance efforts to achieve the greatest impact. The division uses data and evidence to identify areas and industries in which serious violations may be widespread, despite a lack of complaints, and often organizes educational and enforcement initiatives in those areas. WHD complements enforcement with outreach and education to employers. By partnering with industry and employers to produce meaningful compliance assistance, WHD can increase compliance with the laws it enforces. Employers can anticipate and plan when the agency provides them with resources and information concerning the Nation's wage and workplace standards. Employers and employees benefit when businesses manage costs through innovation and efficiencies rather than by violating the law, undercutting workers and other businesses. By combining enforcement with education, more workers in this country can obtain stable and secure income and responsible businesses can succeed.

- Wage and hour laws provide a basic level of economic security to the nation's workers and allow them to earn enough wages to purchase goods and services to support themselves and their families. The economic security of the nation's workforce also supports America's businesses and economy as a whole. To protect fair and vigorous competition, WHD addresses compliance issues systemically and deters violations through compliance assistance to reach a broader audience. The combination of enforcement and compliance assistance increases compliance with the laws and makes workers who have experienced wage violations whole.

Compliance assistance to the employer community is a central component of WHD's efforts to meet its mission. Through direct engagement with industry leaders at a national, regional, and local level, WHD has developed productive relationships that have resulted in meaningful partnerships and compliance assistance tools that have been well received by the employer community. In the process, rather than relying on traditional text-heavy fact sheets and PowerPoint presentations, WHD has had early success transitioning into the use of modern compliance assistance methods and has used innovative ways to share information including visual design, infographics, videos, interactive web-based tools, and language that is tailored to the employer audience and accessible and usable in multiple contexts and formats. For example, by analyzing data on incoming compliance assistance questions and most frequently visited webpages, as well as through discussions with major industry associations, WHD recognized a need to develop more employer-friendly information regarding the FMLA. WHD collaborated with industry stakeholders to produce an easy-to-understand FMLA Employer Guide2 that has been distributed widely through industry channels. While these efforts have received universal support from stakeholders, WHD has been unable to expand on these successful models due to resource limitations. Demand for accessible information about the laws WHD enforces remains high; in FY 2016 alone WHD's webpages were viewed more than 35 million times. Additional funds would be used to expand on these efforts to modernize compliance assistance information and allow WHD to reach and inform a broader audience, increasing compliance with the laws WHD enforces.
