= All-American Flag Act =

2024 legislation about government flags

- Long title: All-American Flag Act
- Enacted by: the 118th United States Congress
- Effective: July 30, 2024

Citations
- Public law: Pub. L. 118–74 (text) (PDF)
- Statutes at Large: 138 Stat. 1505

Legislative history
- Introduced in the Senate as S. 1973 by Sherrod Brown (D-OH) on June 14, 2023; Committee consideration by Homeland Security and Governmental Affairs; Passed the Senate on November 2, 2023; Passed the House on July 22, 2024; Signed into law by President Joe Biden on July 30, 2024

The All-American Flag Act, Pub. L. 118-74, 138 Stat. 1505, is a U.S. federal statute enacted by the 118th United States Congress and signed into law by President Joe Biden on July 30, 2024. The act mandates that American flags purchased by the U.S. government must be produced entirely with American-made materials and manufactured in the United States.

== Background and provisions ==
Prior to the All-American Act, the U.S. government was permitted to purchase flags containing 50% American-made materials.

According to the U.S. Census Bureau, the value of U.S. imports of American flags was $4.4 million in 2015, of which more than $4 million worth of imported flags came from China. In 2017, the U.S. imported $10 million American flags, 99.5% of which came from China.

The act, codified at 41 U.S.C. § 6310, requires that the U.S. government may only purchase U.S. flags that are "100 percent manufactured in the United States from articles, materials, or supplies that have been grown or 100 percent produced or manufactured in the United States". The act specifies exceptions, including an exception if flags of satisfactory quality and sufficient quantity cannot be procured as needed at market prices.

== Procedural history ==
U.S. Senators Gary Peters (D-MI), Chairman of the Homeland Security and Governmental Affairs Committee, Sherrod Brown (D-OH), Susan Collins (R-ME), and Joe Manchin (D-WV) introduced the legislation.

The bill S. 1973 was passed in the Senate by unanimous consent on November 2, 2023. On July 22, 2024, the bill was considered and passed by the House. President Biden signed it into law on July 30, 2024.

== Recent developments ==
In March 2025, Senators Rick Scott (R-FL), Ted Cruz (R-TX), and Thom Tillis (R-NC) introduced a bill, the Make American Flags in America Act of 2025. The purpose of the bill is to close loopholes in the All-American Flag Act that have allowed Chinese companies to sell China-made American flags on the Internet and label them as American-made.

== See also ==
- Buy American Act
- United States sanctions against China
