= Advocate for Competition =

Role coded in US federal law

An Advocate for Competition (also referred to as a Competition Advocate) is a role within each executive agency of the United States federal government.

== Responsibilities ==
The Advocate for Competition role is required by federal law to be assigned to a person in each executive agency. The role of an Advocate for Competition is to:

[promote] the acquisition of commercial items, promoting full and open competition, challenging requirements that are not stated in terms of functions to be performed, performance required or essential physical characteristics, and challenging barriers to the acquisition of commercial items and full and open competition such as unnecessarily restrictive statements of work, unnecessarily detailed specifications, and unnecessarily burdensome contract clauses.

The purpose of the role reflects the belief that "competition is the cornerstone of [the federal] acquisition system and is a critical tool for achieving the best return on investment possible for our taxpayers".

== Legal framework ==
The role is coded in federal law within section 1705 of Public Law 111–350 of 2011, "[a]n Act to enact certain laws relating to public contracts as Title 41, United States Code, Public Contracts".

An Advocate for Competition may also function as a Task and Delivery Order Ombudsman, for example the two roles are held by the same person in the Department of Health and Human Services. This ombudsman reviews complaints from contractors and ensures they are afforded a fair opportunity to be considered, consistent with the procedures in the contract. Sub-part 16.505 of the Federal Acquisition Regulation provides that "the ombudsman must be a senior agency official who is independent of the contracting officer and may be the agency's advocate for competition".
