= Executive Order 12564 =

United States executive order

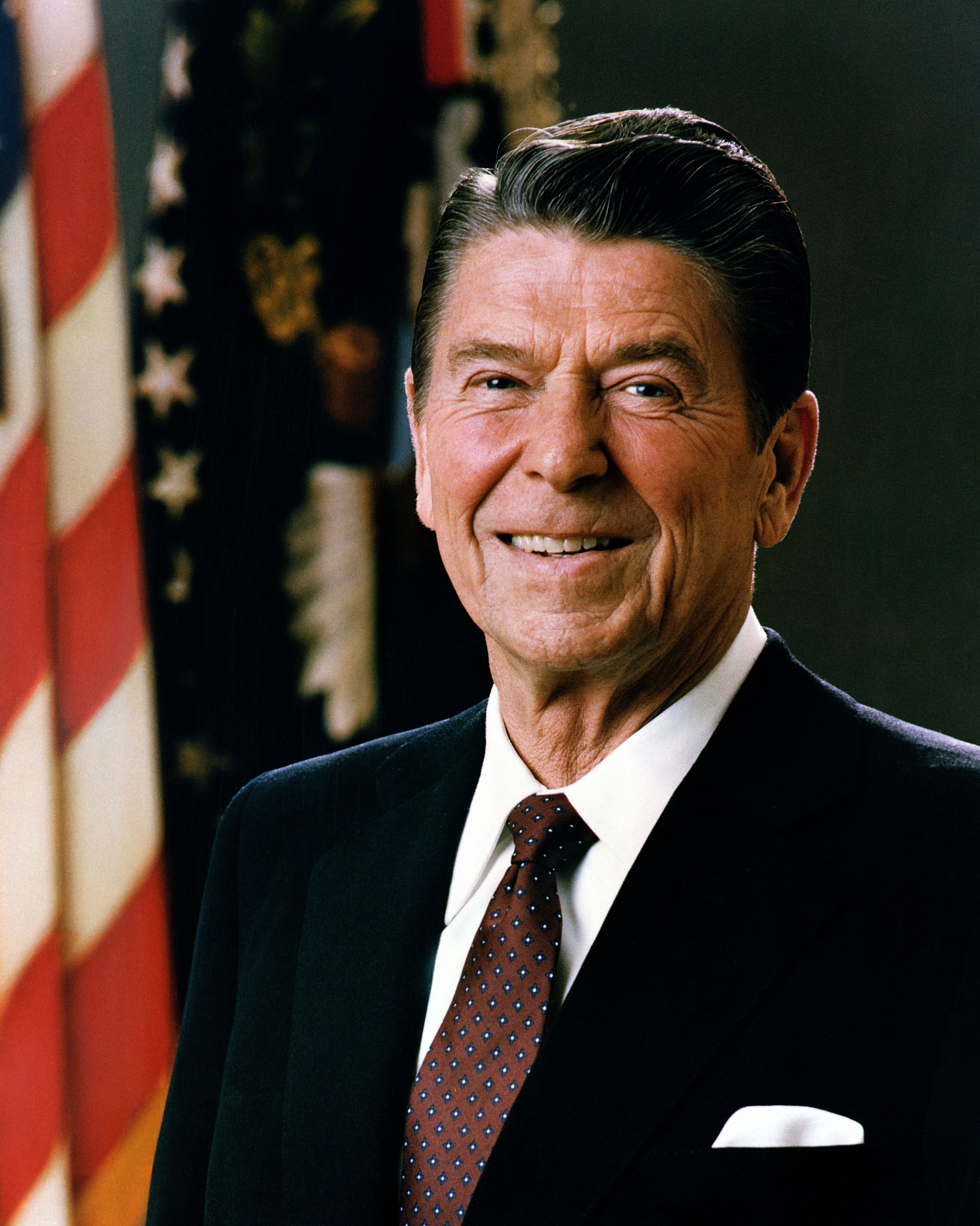
Executive Order 12564 was signed by President Ronald Reagan on September 15, 1986.

Executive Order 12564, signed on September 15, 1986 by U.S. President Ronald Reagan, was an executive order intended to prevent federal employees from using illegal drugs and require that government agencies initiate drug testing on their employees.

In September 1986, after determining that drug use was having serious adverse effects upon a significant portion of the national workforce and was resulting in billions of dollars of lost productivity each year, President Reagan issued Executive Order 12564. The order required all federal employees to refrain from using illegal drugs and authorized drug testing under certain circumstances to identify illegal drug users.

Executive Order 12564 requires the head of each executive branch agency to develop a plan for achieving a drug-free workplace. The plans were to include provisions for identifying illegal drug users through drug testing.

Although the executive order has been described as having "little significance for private employers", it has also been termed the beginning of the drug testing movement in the United States, that "set in place many of the features of workplace drug testing that have now become standard for public and regulated private employers", including the Drug-Free Workplace Act about two years later.

== See also ==
- List of United States federal executive orders § Ronald Reagan (1981–1989)
