= Drug-Free Workplace Act of 1988 =

United States law

- Long title: A bill to require the recipients of Federal grants and contracts to maintain drug-free workplaces, and for other purposes.
- Enacted by: the 100th United States Congress

Legislative history
- Introduced in the House as H.R. 4719 by Jack Brooks (D–TX) on June 1, 1988; Committee consideration by United States House Committee on Government Operations

Major amendments
- Anti-Drug Abuse Act of 1988

The Drug-Free Workplace Act of 1988 (41 U.S.C. 81) is an act of the United States which requires some federal contractors and all federal grantees to agree that they will provide drug-free workplaces as a precondition of receiving a contract or grant from a federal agency.

Although all covered contractors and grantees must maintain a drug-free workplace, the specific components necessary to meet the act's requirements vary based on whether the contractor or grantee is an individual or an organization. The requirements for organizations are more extensive than individuals' as organizations have to take comprehensive, programmatic steps to achieve a workplace free of drugs.

== History ==
Before the Drug Free Workplace Act, there was no federal regulation that employers could use to mandate drug tests, or enforce penalties against employees using drugs, which led to employers to establishing their own policies against drug use.

President Ronald Reagan signed the law due to the amount of drug abuse occurring in the military. Drug abuse had become such a huge problem that "He issued Executive Order 12564 banning all federal employees (on and off duty) from using drugs." Soon after this law went into effect, smaller corporations adopted the same rules.

The act was organized as positive law in chapter 81 of Title 41 of the United States Code in 2011.

== Policy ==
The policy put out by the United States Department of Labor states it is illegal for employees "to manufacture, distribute, dispense or have in possession prohibited controlled substances" Under the law, any employer in a covered industry such as federal contracting, trucking, or oil and gas must develop and enforce a policy on drug use in the workplace. These policies are commonly included as part of an employment contract. While the majority of states have legalized marijuana in some form, covered employers are still required to treat marijuana use as a disciplinable offense under the Drug-Free Workplace Act, as it is still considered a controlled substance under federal law.

== Penalties ==
Penalties for employees in covered industries who commit drug violations vary. However, penalties for contractors and companies are standardized. One can be penalized in the following ways. For example, payment for services can be revoked, contracts can be terminated, and the contractor may be denied future grants or contracts for a specified period of time. The government agency who published the contract determines if a violation has occurred and what, if any, penalty should be assessed.
