= Title 41 of the Code of Federal Regulations =

American law on government contracts

Title 41 of the Code of Federal Regulations (CFR), titled Public Contracts and Property Management, is the portion of the CFR that governs federal government public contracts within the United States.

== Contents ==
Title 41 comprises four volumes, and is divided into six subtitles. Only three of the subtitles are currently in use, the others being either obsolesced (Subtitle A) or reserved for future use (Subtitles D and E). The title contains the administrative regulations for public contracts for the underlying federal statutes in Title 41 of the United States Code. It is the portion of the Code of Federal Regulations (CFR) that governs federal government public contracts within the United States. It is available in digital or printed form.

=== Subtitle A: Federal Procurement Regulations System ===
Subtitle A, which previously covered the Federal Procurement Regulations System, was replaced in 1983 by the Federal Acquisition Regulation now set out in Title 48 of the Code of Federal Regulations.

=== Subtitle B: Other Provisions Relating to Public Contracts ===
Subtitle B is titled Other Provisions Relating to Public Contracts. It comprises Chapters 50, 51, 60 and 61, and occupies substantially all of Volume 1.

Volume	Chapter	Sections	Regulatory entity
1	50	50-1–50-999	Public Contracts, Department of Labor
1	51	51-1–51-99	Committee for Purchase From People Who Are Blind or Severely Disabled
1	60	60-1–60-999	Office of Federal Contract Compliance Programs, Equal Employment Opportunity, Department of Labor
1	61	61-1–61-999	Office of the Assistant Secretary for Veterans' Employment and Training Service, Department of Labor

=== Subtitle C: Federal Property Management Regulations System ===
Subtitle C is titled Federal Property Management Regulations System. It comprises Chapters 101, 105, 109, 114, 115 and 128, and occupies all of Volume 2 and substantially all of Volume 3.

Volume	Chapter	Sections	Regulatory entity
2	101	101-1–101-99	Federal Property Management Regulations
3	102	102-1–102-220	Federal Management Regulation
3	105	105-1–105-999	General Services Administration
3	109	109-1–109-99	Department of Energy Property Management Regulations
3	114	114-1–114-99	Department of the Interior
3	115	115-1–115-99	Environmental Protection Agency
3	128	128-1–128-99	Department of Justice

=== Subtitle D: Other Provisions Relating to Property Management ===
Subtitle D is not in use and is reserved for other provisions relating to property management.

=== Subtitle E: Federal Information Resources Management Regulations System ===
Subtitle E is not in use and is reserved for provisions relating to the Federal Information Resources Management Regulations System.

=== Subtitle F: Federal Travel Regulation System ===
Subtitle F is titled Federal Travel Regulation System. It comprises Chapters 300 through 304 and occupies substantially all of Volume 4.

Volume	Chapter	Sections	Regulatory entity
4	300	300-1--300-99	Federal Information Resources Management Regulation
4	301	301-1–301-99	Temporary Duty (TDY) Travel Allowances
4	302	302-1–302-99	Relocation Allowances
4	303	303-1–303-99	Payment of Expenses Connected with the Death of Certain Employees
4	304	304-1–304-99	Payment of Travel Expenses from a Non-Federal Source
