= Robert L. Bacon =

American lawyer and politician (1884–1938)

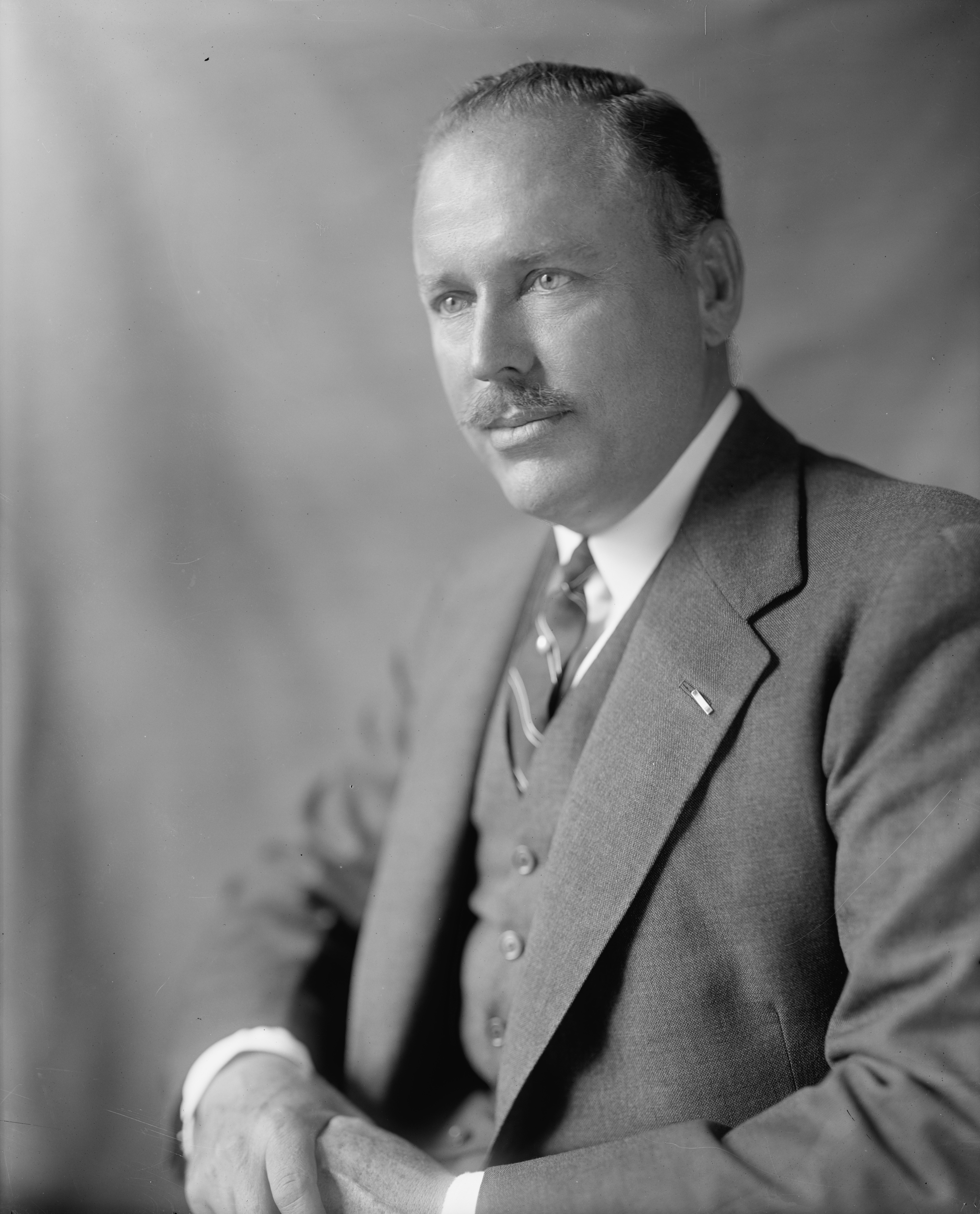
- Bacon, 1923–1938

Member of the U.S. House of Representatives from New York's 1st district
- In office March 4, 1923 – September 12, 1938
- Preceded by: Frederick C. Hicks
- Succeeded by: Leonard Hall

Personal details
- Born: July 23, 1884 Jamaica Plain, Massachusetts, U.S.
- Died: September 12, 1938 (aged 54) Lake Success, New York, U.S.
- Party: Republican
- Spouse: Virginia Murray Bacon
- Parent: Robert Bacon
- Education: Harvard University; Harvard Law School
- Profession: Politician, banker, lawyer, military officer

Military service
- Allegiance: United States
- Branch/service: United States Army; U.S. Officers' Reserve Corps
- Rank: Major; Colonel
- Battles/wars: World War I
- Awards: Distinguished Service Medal

Robert Low Bacon (July 23, 1884 – September 12, 1938) was an American politician, a banker and military officer. He served as a congressman from New York from 1923 until his death in 1938. He is known as one of the authors of the Davis–Bacon Act of 1931, which regulates wages for employees on federal projects.

== Early life and education ==
Born in Jamaica Plain, Massachusetts, the son of Martha Waldron Cowdin and future Secretary of State Robert Bacon, he received a common school education as a child. He went on to graduate from Harvard University in 1907 and from Harvard Law School in 1910.

== Career ==
After graduation, Bacon was employed at the United States Treasury Department, where he worked until 1911. He moved to Old Westbury, New York, to engage in banking in New York City.

Bacon attended the business men's training camp at Plattsburgh in 1915, and served on the Texas border with the New York National Guard in 1916 at the Texas border. During World War I, he served with the Field Artillery, United States Army from April 24, 1917, to January 2, 1919. He attained the rank of major and was awarded the Distinguished Service Medal. Commissioned in the United States Officers' Reserve Corps with the rank of lieutenant colonel in 1919, he was promoted to colonel in January 1923 and served until his death.

Bacon was a delegate to the Republican National Convention in Chicago, Illinois, in 1920. In 1922, after Frederick C. Hicks declined to seek another term, Bacon stepped into the race. His opponent was fellow Long Islander, S.A. Warner Baltazzi, whom he defeated in the fall. He entered Congress as a “wet”, someone who did not support prohibition while still continuing his military career in the Officers' Reserve Corps during his years in the House of Representatives.

He faced no significant opposition over his career with the 1932 election possibly being his greatest challenge. That year, he faced Cornelius Vanderbilt Whitney another wealthy member of Long Island society in a race that pitted Bacon against the landslide victory of Franklin D. Roosevelt. Both men belonged to many of the same private clubs and the race became bitter, with Bacon prevailing.

Bacon's longest lasting political achievement may be the Davis–Bacon Act of 1931 which remain in force, with amendments. Bacon introduced similar legislation for many years and succeeded in securing passage after workings on depression-era federal spending projects found that jobs were going to cheaper workers from other areas.

Bacon was a supporter of the repeal of prohibition and introduced a proposal to amend the 18th amendment to allow states to regulate alcohol. This amendment failed; but prohibition was ultimately repealed in 1933.

== Personal life ==
He became engaged to Cecilia May in 1911, but they never married. He married Virginia Murray on April 14, 1913.

Bacon's brother, Gaspar G. Bacon was the President of the Massachusetts Senate from 1929 to 1932 and Lieutenant Governor of Massachusetts from 1933 to 1935. His nephew was the actor Gaspar G. Bacon Jr. better known as David Bacon.

Bacon died of a heart attack near the State Police barracks in Lake Success, New York, while on his way home from a speaking engagement in New York City on September 12, 1938, at the age of 54.

He is interred at Arlington National Cemetery.

== See also ==
- Davis–Bacon Act
- List of members of the United States Congress who died in office (1900–1949)

U.S. House of Representatives
Preceded by Frederick C. Hicks	Member of the U.S. House of Representatives from New York's 1st congressional district March 4, 1923 – September 12, 1938	Succeeded by Leonard Hall
