= Fortra =

American cybersecurity technology company

- Type: Private
- Industry: Information security
- Founded: 1982 in Minneapolis, Minnesota
- Headquarters: Eden Prairie, United States
- Key people: Matt Reck, CEO
- Products: Cybersecurity software and services
- Number of employees: 3,000
- Parent: TA Associates, Harvest Partners, Charlesbank Capital Partners, HGGC
- Website: www.fortra.com

Fortra (formerly HelpSystems) is an American cybersecurity company based in Eden Prairie, Minnesota. The company was founded as Help/38 in 1982, rebranded as HelpSystems in 1988, and became Fortra in 2022. Fortra is owned by private equity firms TA Associates, Harvest Partners, Charlesbank Capital Partners, and HGGC.

== History ==
Help/38 was founded in 1982 by Dick Jacobson. Help/38's first product, Robot/38, provided IT automation for the IBM System/38. In 1988, when IBM replaced the System/38 with the AS/400, the company became known as HelpSystems (sometimes stylized as Help/Systems).

In 1992, HelpSystems became the first software company in the United States to be certified under the ISO 9001 standard.

Between 2005 and 2018, HelpSystems experienced growth and multiple changes in ownership. Acquired by Summit Partners in 2005 and Audax Group in 2007, the company expanded its offerings through the acquisition of several software firms. Summit Partners repurchased a majority stake in 2012, followed by a series of acquisitions including Safestone, CCSS, and IBM's ShowCase business intelligence products.

H.I.G. Capital acquired the company in 2015. Subsequent additions of Tango/04 Computing Group, Linoma Software, and TeamQuest added real-time monitoring, secure file transfer, and IT service optimization solutions to HelpSystems' offerings. In 2018, private equity firm HGGC became the lead investor, and HelpSystems acquired Midrange Performance Group. HelpSystems rebranded as Fortra in November 2022.

In 2023, Fortra collaborated with Microsoft's Digital Crimes Unit and Health Information Sharing and Analysis Center to combat the abuse of cracked, legacy copies of their Cobalt Strike software by cybercriminals for distributing malware, including ransomware. The U.S. District Court for the Eastern District of New York authorized the disruption of malicious infrastructure, enabling relevant ISPs and CERTs to take it offline.

In July 2024, Fortra collaborated with Europol in "Operation Morpheus" to dismantle nearly 600 IP addresses associated with the criminal use of Cobalt Strike. This effort, involving 27 countries and private sector partners, significantly enhanced global cybersecurity by mitigating the misuse of Fortra's software for malicious activities.

=== For Core Security Technologies ===
Core Security logo c. 2016

In 1996, Core Security was founded in Buenos Aires, Argentina. One year later, the CoreLabs Research group was established and published its first advisory.

Core conducted its first penetration test for a U.S. company in 1998. In the same year, Core Security was recognized as an "Endeavor Entrepreneur" by the Endeavor Foundation, which supports entrepreneurial projects in emerging markets.

In 2000, the company opened its first U.S. office in New York, NY. Two years later, Core released the first and second versions of their flagship penetration testing product, Core Impact Pro.

In 2002, Morgan Stanley became a shareholder in Core, investing USD 1.5 million and retaining a seat on the board. In 2003, the company's U.S. headquarters were relocated from New York to Boston, and in 2009, Core added development sites in Boston and India.

Mark Hatton was named CEO in March 2009 and served in that role until 2015.

Core announced the beta of its new security testing and measurement product, Core Insight, in 2010. Core Insight 3.0 was released in 2013.

In 2012, Core announced partnerships with nCircleand NT Objectives.

In 2014, Core Security added Intrinium to its Partner Program, expanding its reach to the Pacific Northwest. In the same year, Core Security announced the latest version of its Core Attack Intelligence Platform.

In December 2015, Core Security was acquired by identity and access management (IAM) company Courion; in May 2016, Courion rebranded itself with the Core Security name.

In July 2016, Core Security Technologies acquired Damballa for $US 9 million.

In 2017, Core Security merged with SecureAuth and in February 2019, HelpSystems acquired the Core Security solutions/products from SecureAuth. A year later, on March 4, 2020, Core Security by Helpsystems acquired Cobalt Strike. In 2022, HelpSystems rebranded as Fortra.

== Acquisitions ==
Fortra expanded its cybersecurity capabilities in 2019 through the acquisition of Core Security and UK-based Clearswift. TA Associates and Charlesbank Capital Partners also became investors. In 2020, the company expanded further by acquiring data classification firms Titus and Boldon James and acquired cloud-based data protection provider Vera.

In 2021, Fortra acquired several companies to expand its cybersecurity and data protection services, including FileCatalyst, Digital Defense, Beyond Security, Agari, PhishLabs, and Digital Guardian. During this time, private equity firm Harvest Partners SCF LP also acquired partial ownership in HelpSystems.

In 2022, Fortra acquired Tripwire, Alert Logic, Terranova Security, and Outflank. These acquisitions extended Fortra's cybersecurity capabilities, adding solutions for IT security compliance, cloud-based security, security awareness training, and advanced threat detection respectively. In October of that year, PhishLabs by Fortra identified a weakness in Google Ads being used by attackers to target financial institutions. Alert Logic was later acquired from Fortra by LevelBlue.

== Subsidiaries ==
=== Core Security Technologies ===
Core Security is an American computer and network security subsidiary of Fortra that provides cyber threat prevention and identity access management software products and services, including penetration testing, network traffic analysis, threat detection, privileged access management, and identity governance The company’s research arm, CoreLabs, identifies new IT security vulnerabilities, publishes public vulnerability advisories, and works with vendors to assist in eliminating the exposures they find.

==== Recognition ====
In 2013, Core Security was named to the 2013 Inc. 500/5000 List.

In 2014, Core Security won the Information Security Magazine and SearchSecurity.com 2014 Readers' Choice Awards for "Excellence in Vulnerability Management."

==== Research and advisories ====
According to its website, Core Security's research department, Core Labs, conducts research in system vulnerabilities, cyber attack planning and simulation, source code auditing and cryptography. Core Labs publishes security advisories, technical papers, project information and shared software tools for public use, with its researchers participating in IT security research conferences including the Black Hat Briefings.

== Products and services ==
Fortra categorizes its cybersecurity and automation products into the following areas:

=== Data protection ===
Fortra's data protection solutions focus on protecting sensitive information from unauthorized access and data breaches. Digital Guardian offers data loss prevention (DLP) and secure collaboration. Fortra's Data Classification Suite, previously known as Titus and Boldon James, specializes in data classification and security, ensuring that data is appropriately marked and handled.

=== Infrastructure protection ===
Fortra's infrastructure protection segment includes Cobalt Strike, Outflank, Core Security, Digital Defense, and Beyond Security, which offer tools and services for penetration testing, vulnerability management, fuzz testing, and red teaming.

=== Digital risk and email security ===
Agari's email security solutions protect organizations from phishing and email-based attacks. PhishLabs provides digital risk protection services, including threat intelligence and anti-phishing capabilities. Clearswift specializes in content inspection and data loss prevention.

=== Security awareness training ===
Terranova Security offers security awareness training, equipping employees with the knowledge to recognize and prevent cybersecurity threats. This training is intended to build a human firewall against cyber attacks.

=== Managed security services ===
Fortra's managed security services provide security monitoring and management. Tripwire's managed services focus on maintaining IT system file integrity and compliance. Digital Guardian provides managed data loss prevention (DLP) and PhishLabs offers managed digital risk protection.

=== Secure file transfer ===
GoAnywhere MFT provides encrypted file transfer capabilities, aligning with various regulatory standards like PCI DSS and HIPAA. The system features audit trails and automated workflows, accessible through a browser-based interface.
