= Title 41 of the United States Code =

U.S. federal statutes on public contracts

Title 41 of the United States Code (titled Public Contracts) is federal legislation that codifies federal statutes regarding public contracts in the United States. It was enacted on January 4, 2011. The law serves as the statutory foundation for federal procurement and provides the legal authority for the Federal Acquisition Regulation (FAR). The title is organized into four subtitles and 87 chapters that define procurement policy, establish advertising requirements and labor standards, outline procedures for contract disputes, and mandate various requirements other requirements.

== History and purpose ==
Title 41 provides the underlying legal authority for the Federal Acquisition Regulation (FAR), which governs how executive agencies acquire goods and services. The title was enacted into positive law on January 4, 2011, through the passage of Public Law 111-350. According to the House Office of the Law Revision Counsel, the codification removes technical errors and organizes the laws into a structure without changing their substantive meaning. Title 41 is a restatement of existing statutes; therefore, judicial interpretations of the original acts remain binding precedents for the current code. This title contains the statutory laws passed by Congress; the administrative regulations for implementing these laws are found in Title 41 of the Code of Federal Regulations (CFR).

== Contents ==
=== Table of contents ===
==== Subtitle I — Federal Procurement Policy ====
- Subdivision A — General
  - Chapter 1 — Definitions
- Subdivision B — Office of Federal Procurement Policy
  - Chapter 11 — Establishment of Office and Authority and Functions of Administration
  - Chapter 12 — Federal Acquisition Institute
  - Chapter 13 — Acquisition Councils
  - Chapter 15 — Cost Accounting Standards
  - Chapter 17 — Agency Responsibilities and Procedures
  - Chapter 19 — Simplified Acquisition Procedures
  - Chapter 21 — Restrictions on Obtaining and Disclosing Certain Information
  - Chapter 23 — Miscellaneous
- Subdivision C — Procurement
  - Chapter 31 — General
  - Chapter 33 — Planning and Solicitation
  - Chapter 35 — Truthful Cost or Pricing Data
  - Chapter 37 — Awarding of Contracts
  - Chapter 39 — Specific Types of Contracts
  - Chapter 41 — Task and Delivery Order Contracts
  - Chapter 43 — Allowable Costs
  - Chapter 45 — Contract Financing
  - Chapter 47 — Miscellaneous

==== Subtitle II — Other Advertising and Contract Provisions ====
- Chapter 61 — Advertising
- Chapter 63 — General Contract Provisions
- Chapter 65 — Contracts for Materials, Supplies, Articles, and Equipment Exceeding $10,000
- Chapter 67 — Service Contract Labor Standards

==== Subtitle III — Contract Disputes ====
- Chapter 71 — Contract Disputes
  - Section 7101 — Definitions
  - Section 7102 — Applicability of chapter
  - Section 7103 — Decision by contracting officer
  - Section 7104 — Contractor's right of appeal from decision by contracting officer
  - Section 7105 — Agency boards
  - Section 7106 — Agency board procedures for accelerated and small claims
  - Section 7107 — Judicial review of agency board decisions
  - Section 7108 — Payment of claims
  - Section 7109 — Interest

==== Subtitle IV — Miscellaneous ====
- Chapter 81 — Drug-Free Workplace
- Chapter 83 — Buy American
- Chapter 85 — Committee for Purchase from People Who Are Blind or Severely Disabled
- Chapter 87 — Kickbacks

=== Subtitle I: Federal procurement policy ===
Subtitle I establishes the overarching framework for the federal acquisition system and the management of government procurement. This subtitle centralizes procurement leadership by defining the roles of administrative bodies and providing a uniform set of statutory definitions. It dictates the fundamental requirements for contract planning and solicitation, specifically emphasizing a preference for full and open competition in the awarding of federal contracts. Additionally, the subtitle addresses policy mandates such as Cost Accounting Standards (CAS) and the advancement of "small business concerns" within the federal marketplace.

=== Subtitle II: Other advertising and contract provisions ===
Subtitle II addresses transparency and mandatory labor standards for federal projects. It maintains the general requirement that government contracts be publicly advertised to ensure a fair and competitive process. The subtitle also codifies major labor laws, including the Walsh-Healey Act and the McNamara–O'Hara Service Contract Act.

=== Subtitle III: Contract disputes ===
Subtitle III governs the resolution of legal disagreements between federal agencies and private contractors. It is the codification of the Contract Disputes Act of 1978. Under this subtitle, a contractor must first obtain a formal "final decision" from a contracting officer before pursuing an appeal through an agency board of contract appeals or the United States Court of Federal Claims.

=== Subtitle IV: Miscellaneous ===
Subtitle IV contains various mandates that regulate the conduct of federal contractors. These include the Buy American preference for domestic products, the Drug-Free Workplace Act requirements, the Committee for Purchase from People Who Are Blind or Severely Disabled, and the Anti-Kickback Enforcement Act.

== Litigation ==
Several court cases have been held regarding the provisions contained within this title.

== See also ==
- Advocate for Competition
- Federal Acquisition Regulation
