= Kennet Partners =

British private equity investment firm

- Type: Limited company
- Industry: Private Equity
- Founded: 1997; 29 years ago
- Headquarters: London, England, United Kingdom; Foster City, California, United States
- Key people: Michael Elias, Javier Rojas, Eric Filipek, Hillel Zidel
- Products: Private equity funds
- Number of employees: 12
- Website: www.kennet.com

Kennet Partners is a private equity investment firm that provides growth capital to software, Internet and technology-enabled business services companies in Europe and the US.

Kennet Partners is headquartered in London, England, and has an office in San Francisco, California. The firm raised its fourth fund in 2014, bringing total capital under management to $700 million.

== Founding / history ==
Kennet was founded in 1997 as Kennet Capital, a joint venture between technology investment bank Broadview International and asset management firm Electra Partners. In 2000, Kennet became a wholly owned subsidiary of Broadview. In 2003 the partners of Kennet completed a management buy-out and became independent.

Kennet's first fund was primarily targeted at early-stage technology investments in Europe. With its second fund, Kennet began making growth equity investments in both Europe and the U.S., and this has remained the firm's exclusive strategy to this day.

== Funds and investments ==
Kennet has raised five funds:

- 1997 Kennet I LP (£48.3 million)
- 2000 Kennet II LP ($204 million)
- 2008 Kennet III LP (€201 million)
- 2014 Kennet IV LP (€105 million)
- 2020 Kennet V LP ($250 million)

Institutional investors in the Kennet funds include Access Capital Partners, Adveq, Alpha Associates, BNP Private Equity, Credit Suisse, European Investment Fund, LGT Capital Partners and Siemens.

=== Investments ===
Since inception, Kennet has invested in 60 companies, of which Kennet's most notable exits include Altitun, Paragon Software, No Wires Needed, Cramer Systems, Chipidea, Adviva Media, NetPro, MedeAnalytics, GoViral, FRS Global, Prolexic Technologies, and Schoolwires.

Other investments include:

- ABA English
- Adikteev
- Aspective
- BuyVIP
- Consul Risk Management
- Clearswift
- Conversica
- Daptiv (fka eProject)
- Impartner
- Intelepeer (fka VoEX)
- Kapow Technologies
- Kemp
- Monis Software
- Orchestream
- RealityMine
- Receipt Bank
- Recommind
- Rivo Software
- Rimilia
- Sequans Communications
- Sermo
- Spreadshirt
- STS BV
- Telemedicine Clinic
- ThinkHR
- TradingPartners
- Ubizen
- Volantis Systems

== Competitors ==
Kennet's investment strategy is similar to that of other growth capital investment firms such as Summit Partners, TA Associates and Insight Venture Partners. In Europe, Kennet competes with firms such as Eight Roads Ventures, Highland Europe, Scottish Equity Partners and the growth equity arm of Index Ventures. Competitors in the U.S. include JMI Equity and Summit Partners' Accelerator Fund.
