= Boldon James =

Software company in United Kingdom

Boldon James is a UK-based software company incorporated in February 1985, and specialising in data classification and secure messaging solutions aimed primarily at the commercial, defence, intelligence and government marketplaces. The company is named after its founders Peter Boldon and Roger James. The company was acquired in June 2020 by Minnesota based software developer HelpSystems (now Fortra).

== History ==
Originally, Boldon James specialised in Information Processing Architecture (IPA) networking solutions for interworking with International Computers Limited (ICL) systems, with offices in Congleton and Alsager. During the 1990s, the company was the main shirt sponsor of Crewe Alexandra F.C..

In October 2007, Boldon James was acquired as an autonomous subsidiary of Qinetiq a major UK plc and FTSE 250 company, who took over the company from previous owners, a management buy out led by Martin Sugden and backed by Livingbridge.

In June 2020, Minnesota based software developer HelpSystems acquired Boldon James from parent Qinetiq. In 2022, HelpSystems rebranded to become Fortra.

== Products ==
Boldon James produces a range of messaging products, principally integrating with Microsoft Exchange and Outlook, including addons for Outlook Web Access, X.400 Bridgehead connector (gateways), and products designed to integrate Exchange with large third party LDAP Directories, known as MasterKey+, MK+ or enterprise directory. The company also provides related support and maintenance services.
