= Davis–Bacon Act of 1931 =

US law on wages for public works

Davis–Bacon Act
- Enacted by: the 71st United States Congress

Citations
- Public law: Pub. L. 71–798
- Statutes at Large: ch. 411, 46 Stat. 1494

Legislative history
- Signed into law by President Herbert Hoover on March 3, 1931

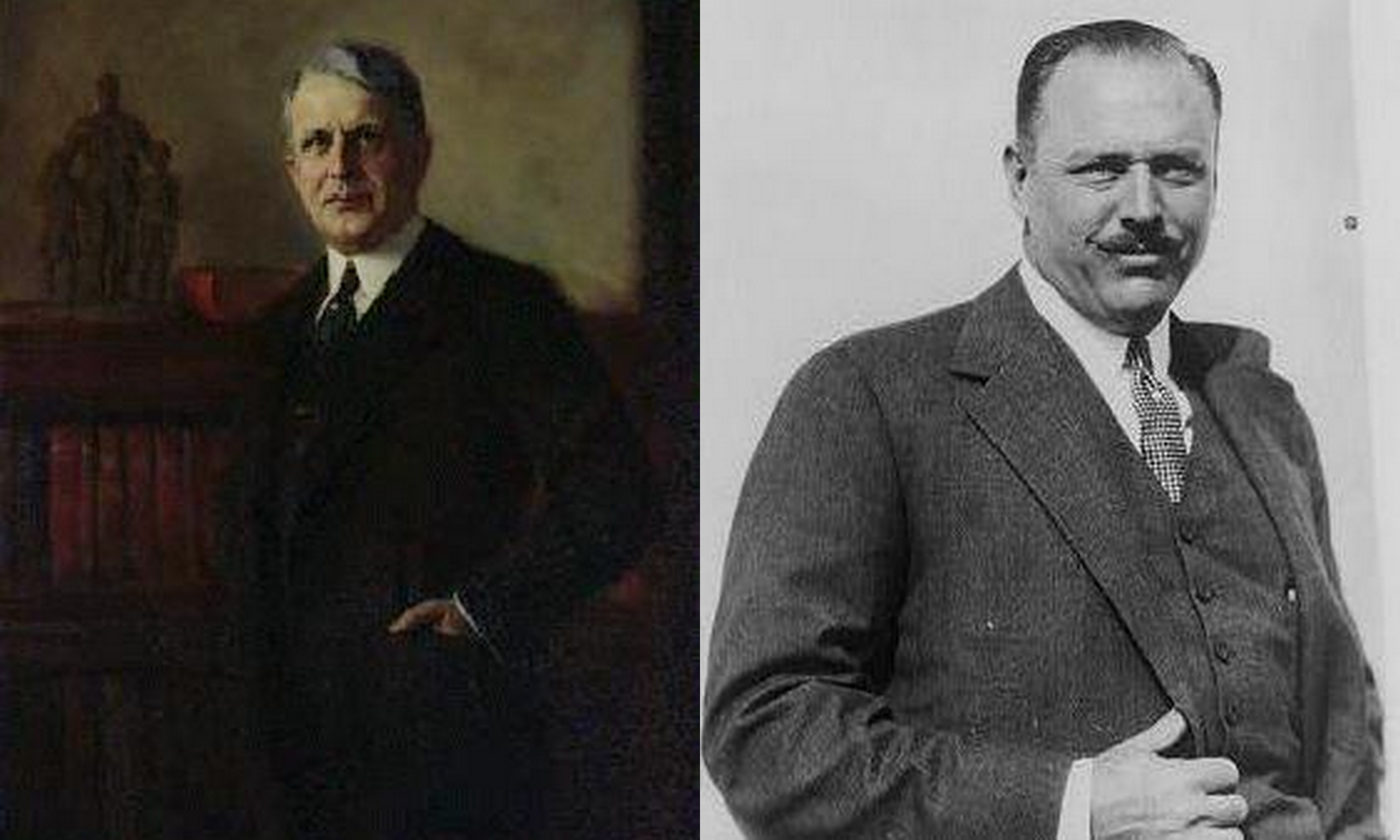
Sen. James J. Davis (R-PA) and Rep. Robert L. Bacon (R–NY-1), the co-sponsors of the Davis–Bacon Act.

The Davis–Bacon Act of 1931 is a United States federal law that establishes the requirement for paying the local prevailing wages on public works projects for laborers and mechanics. It applies to "contractors and subcontractors performing on federally funded or assisted contracts in excess of $2,000 for the construction, alteration, or repair (including painting and decorating) of public buildings or public works".

The act is named after its sponsors, James J. Davis, a Senator from Pennsylvania and a former Secretary of Labor under three presidents, and Representative Robert L. Bacon of Long Island, New York. The Davis–Bacon act was passed by Congress and signed into law by President Herbert Hoover on March 3, 1931.

As of 2016, the act increases the cost of wages in federal construction projects by an average of $1.4 billion per year.

== History ==
=== Leading to passage ===
Prior to the passage of the federal Davis–Bacon Act (abbreviated DBA), other jurisdictions in the United States had passed laws that required that contractors on public works projects pay the wage that prevailed locally. "In 1891, Kansas adopted a law requiring that ‘not less than the current rate of per diem wages in the locality where the work is performed shall be paid to laborers, workmen, mechanics, and other persons so employed by or on behalf of the state of Kansas’ or of other local jurisdictions. Through the next several decades, other states followed suit, enacting a variety of labor-protective statutes covering workers in contract production."

In 1927, a contractor employed African-American workers from Alabama to build a Veterans' Bureau hospital in the district of Congressman Bacon. Prompted by concerns about the conditions of workers, displacement of local workers by migrant workers, and competitive pressure toward lower wages, Bacon introduced the first version of his bill in 1927.

Over the next few years, Bacon attempted to introduce variations on the prevailing wage bill 13 times. Finally, in the midst of the Great Depression, with local workers complaining losing jobs to those willing to work for lower wages, and additional complaints from Congressmen frustrated that their efforts to bring "pork barrel" projects home to their districts did not result in jobs for their constituents (and therefore political support from them), the Hoover Administration requested that Congress reconsider the Act once more as a means of preventing falling wages. Sponsored in the Senate by former Labor Secretary Davis, it passed by voice vote and was signed into law on 3 March 1931.

=== Since passage ===
==== Immediately after passage ====
The Davis–Bacon Act has been amended several times in its history. Almost immediately upon passage in 1931, both unions and contractors expressed dissatisfaction with key components of the law. Unions said that the law lacked enforcement teeth, while contractors said that it was impossible to know beforehand what the prevailing wages were when submitting bids. President Hoover issued Executive Order 5778, clarifying some of the enforcement mechanisms, and Congress considered amendments which were vetoed before Hoover left office.

==== 1930s ====
In 1934, Congress passed and President Roosevelt signed the Copeland "Anti-kickback" Act, a supplement to the DBA. This was followed in 1935 with another amendment which introduced five changes: (1) The threshold for falling under the DBA requirements were lowered from $5,000 to $2,000; (2) coverage was extended to all federal contract construction, including painting and decorating; (3) the agency may withhold funds sufficient to pay underpaid workers; (4) the Comptroller General would make a list of contractors who had “disregarded their obligations to employees and subcontractors” so that they could be blacklisted from federal contracts for three years; (5) right of legal action was explicitly granted to laborers regardless of whether they had accepted wages; and (6) DBA contracts would include “the minimum wages to be paid various classes of laborers and mechanics” prior to the submission of bids by a contractor (predetermination). The predetermination requirement set up a mechanism to collect and disseminate appropriate prevailing wage data prior to issuing proposal requests for federal contract bids. Many of these changes were introduced at the urging of labor unions.

==== 1940–1970 ====
In 1941, the reach of the Act was expanded to cover military construction. In the 1950s, questions were raised about which agencies should control which provisions and whether the new interstate highway acts should specifically reference DBA requirements. In the 1960s, the passage of the Walsh–Healey and McNamara–O'Hara Service Contract Acts confused the situation further, as there were pay differences between manufacturing and construction, with contractors and unions having clear but opposite preferences.

In 1962, the House of Representatives convened the Special Subcommittee on Labor, chaired by James Roosevelt D–CA. In response to this committee, the Secretary of Labor established the Wage Appeals Board to allow wage determinations to be reviewed. The committee brought an amendment to the DBA that required the inclusion of fringe benefits in the wage determination.

==== 1970–present ====
In 1979, the U.S. Congress General Accounting Office (GAO) – (which was renamed the Government Accountability Office in 2004) published a report titled, “The Davis–Bacon Act Should Be Repealed". The GAO summarized its argument as:

Significant changes in economic conditions, and the economic character of the construction industry since 1931, plus the passage of other wage laws, make the act unnecessary.

After nearly 50 years, the Department of Labor has not developed an effective program to issue and maintain current and accurate wage determinations; it may be impractical to ever do so.

The act results in unnecessary construction and administrative costs of several hundred million dollars annually (if the construction projects reviewed by GAO are representative) and has an inflationary effect on the areas covered by inaccurate wage rates and the economy as a whole.

This publication reflected an ongoing political debate. Concluding about the same time, the Carter Administration's Office of Management and Budget (OMB) and its Office of Federal Procurement Policy (OFPP) had formed a task force to review DBA and the Services Contract Act. They published new regulations just as they were leaving office. The Reagan Administration froze all pending regulations in order to review them, and then issued its own set of regulations in 1982. These consisted of five changes: (1) setting the threshold for how much of the workforce must be paid a common wage for that wage to become the "prevailing wage" at 50% (previously 30%); (2) strictly limiting the importation of urban rates for projects in rural areas; (3) limiting the use of wages paid on other DBA-covered federal projects in the determination of prevailing rates to prevent bias in the base rate; (4) expanding the potential use of unskilled “helpers” on federal construction; and (5) eliminating the weekly payroll report requirements of the Copeland "Anti-kickback" Act of 1934, opting instead to require reports only in support of enforcement actions. These rules were challenged in Building and Construction Trades' Department. AFL-CIO v. Donovan, 712 F.2d 611 (D.C. Cir. 1983). Of the five changes, all were eventually upheld except for the change in reporting requirements.

In addition to these changes, DBA prevailing wage principles have been included in more than 50 federal statutes.

In November 2013, President Barack Obama signed the Streamlining Claims Processing for Federal Contractor Employees Act into law. This law amended the Davis–Bacon Act by transferring authority from the Government Accountability Office (GAO) to the United States Department of Labor for processing claims for wages due to laborers and mechanics hired by contractors on public works projects.

=== Little Davis–Bacon laws ===
In addition to the federal law, several other jurisdictions have passed "Little Davis–Bacon" laws.

Little Davis–Bacon Statutory Thresholds
State	Threshold Amount
Alabama, Arizona, Arkansas, Colorado, Florida, Georgia, Idaho, Indiana, Iowa, Kansas, Kentucky, Louisiana, Mississippi, New Hampshire, North Carolina, North Dakota, Oklahoma, South Carolina, South Dakota, Utah, Virginia, West Virginia, Wisconsin	No Prevailing Wage Law
Connecticut, Delaware, Maryland, Nevada, Vermont	$100,000 to $1,000,000
Alaska, Maine, Minnesota†, Missouri, Montana, New Mexico, Ohio††, Oregon, Pennsylvania, Tennessee, Wyoming	$25,000 to $75,000
California, Hawaii, New Jersey, Rhode Island	$1,000 to $2,000
Illinois, Massachusetts, Michigan, Nebraska, New York, Texas, Washington	No threshold

=== Suspensions ===
The Davis–Bacon Act allows for suspension by the President in case of emergency. This authority has been exercised four times since passage: twice in general, and twice in limited areas.

- President Franklin D. Roosevelt suspended the Act in 1934 for three weeks to aid in the introduction of New Deal efforts
- President Richard Nixon suspended the Act in 1971 for one month as an anti-inflationary measure
- President George H. W. Bush initiated a suspension in Florida, Louisiana, and Hawaii. This suspension was not lifted until March 1993 by President Bill Clinton. The cited reason for the suspension was the need to provide as many employment opportunities as possible in the recovery from hurricanes Andrew and Iniki.
- President George W. Bush suspended the Act for one month in Florida, Alabama, Mississippi, and Louisiana after Hurricane Katrina.

== Current practice ==
The Davis–Bacon Act is part of the United States Code, codified as 40 U.S.C. 3141-3148. The Act covers four main areas of construction: residential, heavy, buildings, and highway. Within these areas are further classifications, including craft positions such as plumber, carpenter, cement mason/concrete finisher, electrician, insulator, laborer, lather, painter, power equipment operator, roofer, sheet metal worker, truck driver, and welder.

The agency responsible for collecting and disseminating the prevailing wage data is the Wage and Hour Division (WHD) of the United States Department of Labor (DOL). The procedure "involves four steps: (1) planning and scheduling of surveys, (2) conducting the surveys, (3) clarifying and analyzing the respondents' data and (4) issuing the wage determinations."

Planning and scheduling surveys: In the third quarter of each year, the WHD distributes a Regional Planning Survey Report, published by the F. W. Dodge division of the McGraw-Hill Information Systems, to regional offices. The regional offices then consider the types of construction planned as well as the age of the current wage determination. This analysis determines when and where surveys will be conducted.

Issuance of surveys: WD-10 survey forms are sent to contractors and subcontractors along with a cover letter requesting information. Letters and forms are also sent to members of Congress, trade associations, and building trade unions to solicit information from them.

Compilation of data: WHD analysts then review the returned forms for completeness, ambiguity, and inconsistencies. If the information received is deemed to be inadequate, the scope of the survey may be expanded. For example, if it is determined that relevant projects have not been completed recently, or that the area is inadequately represented, WHD may conduct telephone surveys to increase the robustness of data.

Publication of data: Once compiled and analyzed, the wage determinations are made publicly available. See, for example, the Department of Labor website set up for this purpose.

== Controversy ==
Three areas of controversy have surrounded the Davis–Bacon Act since the 1950s. In the beginning, these were touched off because of the Interstate Highway System and the volume of military construction that took place in the Cold War. These became more pronounced in the 1960s as the Space Race took off, and intensified in the wake of Nixon's suspension. Those areas, broadly considered, include (a) data collection and accuracy issues resulting from the way regulations have been formulated and administered, (b) the increased cost of federal construction projects, and (c) claims that the law is racist in conception and effect.

=== Data collection and publication concerns ===
As noted above, the Wage and Hours Division of the Department of Labor collects data through surveys. These surveys are submitted voluntarily. Researchers have found that the methodology suffered from sampling bias and, in some cases, fraud. These are discussed below.

==== Statistical bias ====
For the first 50 years, the WHD used union wages to satisfy the 30% rule. The GAO found similar results in 1979, just prior to the change to the 50% rule: ”Our evaluation of the wage determination files and inquiries regarding 73 wage determinations at Labor's headquarters and five of its regions showed that, in many instances, these wage rates were not adequately or accurately determined. About one-half of the area and project determinations we reviewed were not based on surveys [that the Department of] Labor made of wages paid to workers on private projects in the locality where the wage rates issued were required to be paid. Instead, union-negotiated rates were used, on the assumption that those rates prevailed.”

The use of union data would probably prevail regardless of assumptions, since the data are collected through voluntary surveys. Since the responses are provided voluntarily, and since the response requires a substantial amount of work to understand and complete, it is in the interest of employers with high wage workforces and high overhead to respond. By answering the request for data when employers with lower wage workforces and low overhead do not, they pull the prevailing wage determination in their favor. For smaller employers and employers who do not participate in federal contracting, it is not worth the cost to complete the surveys. Furthermore, it is in the interest of local unions to respond to the surveys, since a predetermination of wage significantly below the union wage would allow non-union employers to bid successfully on contracts. Thus, the survey responses tend to be biased upwards towards collective bargaining agreement wage levels. This source of bias was noted in the DOL Office of the Inspector General report: “A past audit observed that the methods used by WH to obtain survey data allowed bias to be introduced into wage surveys. Statistical sampling of employers was not done. Only data from employers and third parties who volunteered to participate in the surveys were considered. Consequently, data that could have influenced survey results may have been omitted. Also, employers and third parties who may have had a stake in the outcome of wage decisions were afforded an opportunity to submit erroneous data that may have influenced the survey results.”

==== Fraud ====
In addition to claims of bias, researchers and investigators have found evidence of fraud. In 1995, the state of Oklahoma conducted an investigation into the WHD-provided prevailing wages being used in state projects. Oklahoma had a Little Davis–Bacon law that, in an attempt to save on administrative costs, adopted the federal standards. When the state office was notified that some rates had increased 162%, it requested information from the WHD. The WHD denied the Oklahoma Department of Labor access to the survey forms used to determine the wages, so the Oklahoma Department of Labor undertook a criminal investigation. According to Brenda Reneau, then-Commissioner of the Oklahoma Department of Labor, "This investigation found that grossly inaccurate information had been reported to the Federal Government by what the U.S. Department of Labor calls interested third parties. We found inflated numbers of employees on projects, inflated wage rates reported for these same non-existent workers and we found projects that were never built. We also noticed what appears to be a pattern in the reporting method on many of the wage survey forms, as our visual presentation will show here today." In response to this, “a follow-up investigation conducted by the U.S. Department of Labor confirms that not only was a great deal of inaccurate information reported, as we had alleged, but U.S. Department of Labor documents show certain unions in Oklahoma City as the parties who submitted that information. It appears that false information may have been submitted to the U.S. Department of Labor in an attempt, purposefully, to inflate Davis–Bacon wage rates.” In the wake of the state investigations, the WHD withdrew many prevailing wage findings for the state, and the Oklahoma Supreme Court found their Little Davis–Bacon statute to be in violation of the state constitution.

==== Publication delay ====
Both academic and government researchers have found evidence that the procedures used by the WHD result in substantial publication delays. The WHD may take on average more than 30 months to issue data. These render the predetermined prevailing wage findings irrelevant since they may be publishing data that is no longer relevant or accurate.

==== Obsolescence of DBA ====
In addition to these findings, some detractors have pointed out that the Davis–Bacon Act requirements were rendered moot by the Fair Labor Standards Act (FLSA). At the time that Davis–Bacon Act was passed, legal scholars were divided on the question about whether the federal government could regulate labor costs and conditions. The Davis–Bacon Act was seen as a legitimate way to control labor wages and conditions on federal projects since there was clear jurisdiction on those. However, as the Depression rolled on, especially after the West Coast Hotel Co. v. Parrish ruling in 1937, the Roosevelt Administration succeeded in establishing a federal authority to dictate wages, including a federal, universal minimum wage. In the view of some reviewers, this superseded the need for a prevailing wage law specific to federal contracts.

==== Compared to Bureau of Labor Statistics ====
Finally, some detractors have pointed out that the WHD collects the same data as the Bureau of Labor Statistics (BLS), but does it with inferior methods. The BLS samples wages randomly instead of relying on self-reporting. The BLS also uses an interview approach to eliminate reporting errors. Academic researchers have found significant variations between the more accurate and timely BLS data and the WHD data; variances may run around 9%, but in some cases the WHD data may be too low. For these reasons, the DOL Office of Inspector General directed the WHD to investigate whether the BLS wage data could be used in place of the WHD wage data. They declined to do so, prompting another audit of their methodology.

=== Cost ===
The Davis–Bacon Act requires contractors to pay a prevailing wage as predetermined by the WHD. One stated purpose of this is to prevent a "race to the bottom" in which employers may use migrant and other low-skill, unemployed workers to perform the work at low costs. If such a possibility exists in an otherwise free market, then Davis–Bacon requirements artificially inflate labor costs above market levels. In addition, companies that participate in federal construction jobs are required to collect data and report regularly. This adds to overhead costs. As a result of these cost increases, projects of a given scope cost more than they would otherwise, or that projects of a given budget must be constrained in scope, or some combination of both.

Supporters of the Davis–Bacon Act contend that these costs differences either don't exist or may be justified. One contention is that higher paid labor may be paid more because they have superior skills and are more productive. Under this assumption, a union journeyman would be worth the additional money because he works faster, more accurately, and with less supervision than an inexperienced worker. For example, four union journeyman paid $25 per hour might perform as well as or better than five entry level workers being paid $20 per hour. Others point out that federal projects tend to be more complex and require more skilled labor than on either private or state projects. Yet another counterpoint is that by inflating wages, such requirements direct more income into the middle class rather than paying rock bottom dollars to unskilled labor through federal programs while supporting their families through social service programs. Finally, blogger Matthew Yglesias has suggested that because union workers tend to vote overwhelmingly Democratic, and because Democrats favor more federal projects, then Davis–Bacon may actually increase the amount of infrastructure built by supporting those who indirectly vote for more programs.

=== Racism ===
==== Intent and early operation ====
At the time of original passage, Jim Crow Laws were in effect throughout the Southern United States. During World War I, immigration from Europe fell dramatically at precisely the time that Northern industry required additional labor for the war effort. As a result, northern industry and entrepreneurs began to recruit laborers from the South. This brought about or accelerated the Great Migration in which black (and white) laborers from the South came North in search of better pay and opportunity.

The migration in turn created new demographic challenges in the North. White workers were competing against new labor; in some cases, the black workers were used as pawns in an effort to break unions. There were widespread efforts to recruit black workers and in reaction, efforts to thwart recruitment. Black migrants were restricted to specific neighborhoods in northern cities where the buildings were in poor condition and rents were high, forcing them to live in dense conditions.

In that context, the protests against the Long Island hospital built with migrant labor can be seen for what they were: resistance outside of the Jim Crow South to black workers. During this time, complaints about black workers taking federal construction jobs appear sporadically through the legislation history of both prior bills that anticipated Davis–Bacon, and Davis–Bacon itself. On the floor of the House of Representatives, Congressman Upshaw said: "You will not think that a southern man is more than human if he smiles over the fact of your reaction to that real problem you are confronted with in any community with a superabundance or large aggregation of negro labor." U.S. Congressman John J. Cochran (D-Missouri) reported that he had "received numerous complaints in recent months about southern contractors employing low-paid colored mechanics getting work and bringing the employees from the South". U.S. Congressman Clayton Allgood (D-Alabama) reported on "cheap colored labor" that "is in competition with white labor throughout the country".

Despite the initial complaints about the use of migrant workers, the Act does not require that contractors show that workers engaged are local residents, but rather requires that laborers be paid the local prevailing wage. Due to the way the data were collected at that time and due to the fact that construction trades were heavily unionized at that time by craft unions, “prevailing wage” effectively meant “union journeyman wage” as discussed above. Unions operate by negotiating for higher wages, and then working to restrict those eligible for the higher wages to union membership. Craft unions did not admit black apprentices, and therefore black laborers did not have the opportunity to advance to journeyman status. According to Bernstein, “as of 1940 blacks composed 19 percent of the 435,000 unskilled "construction laborers" in the United States and 45 percent of the 87,060 in the South”, and according to Hill, "the increase of Negro participation in building trades apprenticeship training programs rose only from 1.5% to 2%" in New York between 1950 and 1960. Furthermore, Hill pointed out that "[b]ecause the National Labor Relations Board has done little to enforce the anti-closed shop provisions of the Taft Hartley Act, building trades unions affiliated to the AFL-CIO in most instances are closed unions operating closed shops". Therefore, the requirements and mechanisms of the Davis–Bacon Act necessarily prevented black laborers from participating in federally funded construction projects. “According to a study on youth and minority employment published by the Congressional Joint Economic Committee on July 6, 1977, Davis–Bacon wage requirements discourage nonunion contractors from bidding on Federal construction work, thus harming minority and young workers who are more likely to work in the nonunionized sector of the construction industry.” Thus, even if racism was not the intent, racial discrimination was a result of the law initially.

==== Subsequent developments ====
The Congress of Industrial Organizations split from the American Federation of Labor in 1935. The AFL was predominantly made up of craft unions, some of which disallowed black members. The CIO was integrationist. In the years that followed, the AFL and CIO moved towards each other and toward integration. By the time they re-united in 1955, unions were much less discriminatory. Even more recently, rules introduced by the Johnson, Nixon, and Reagan administrations have reduced the discriminatory effects of the Davis–Bacon Act. Black interest groups have found common cause with unions and the NAACP passed a resolution in 1993 in support of the DBA.

== See also ==
- McNamara–O'Hara Service Contract Act
- Copeland "Anti-kickback" Act
- Wage
- Worker's compensation
- Minimum wage
- Living wage
- Prevailing wage
