= Marketo =

Software company providing market automation software

Marketo, Inc.
- Type: Subsidiary
- Traded as: Nasdaq: MKTO
- Industry: Marketing software
- Founded: 2006; 20 years ago
- Founder: Phil Fernandez; Jon Miller; David Morandi
- Headquarters: San Mateo, California, US
- Products: Marketo Engagement Platform; Marketo Lead Management; Marketo Sales Insight; Marketo Revenue Cycle Analytics; Marketo Social Marketing
- Parent: Adobe Inc.
- Website: marketo.com

Marketo, Inc. is an American software company headquartered in San Mateo, California. Marketo develops and sells marketing automation software for account-based marketing, as well as other marketing services and products, including SEO and content creation.

In 2018, Marketo was acquired by Adobe Inc.

== History ==
Previous logo

Phil Fernandez, Jon Miller, and David Morandi founded Marketo in 2006.

In April 2012, Marketo acquired Crowd Factory, which enabled the company to integrate social media marketing capabilities into its application suite.

Marketo filed for an initial public offering and went public on May 17, 2013. In December of that year, the company acquired Insightera, an Israeli company specializing in website personalization, for $20 million in cash and stock.

In June 2016, Vista Equity Partners announced an agreement to acquire Marketo for approximately $1.79 billion, and the acquisition was completed in August 2017. Steve Lucas was named the new chief executive officer of Marketo in October 2016. In August 2017, Marketo announced that it would move all of its marketing automation software onto Google Cloud Platform as part of a six-year partnership to integrate Google's tools into Marketo's products; however, this was paused in 2019.

On September 20, 2018, Adobe Systems announced that it was buying Marketo for $4.75 billion.

== Products ==
Marketo Lead Management was launched in 2008, followed by Marketo Sales Insight in 2009, and Marketo Revenue Cycle Analytics in 2010.

In November 2012, Marketo introduced LaunchPoint, an app and service network for marketing.
