= Allegis Group =

International talent management firm

Allegis Group, Inc.
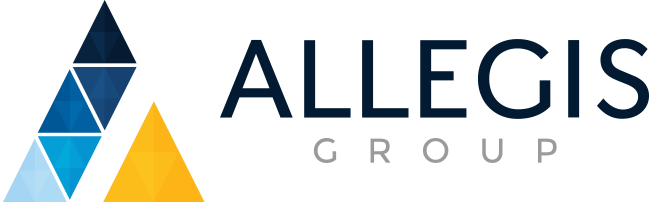
- Opportunity Starts Here
- Company type: Private
- Industry: International staffing and workforce management
- Founded: 1983; 43 years ago
- Headquarters: Hanover, Maryland United States, U.S.
- Key people: Jay Alvather (CEO)
- Revenue: $13.4 billion (2018)
- Number of employees: 19,000 (2018)
- Subsidiaries: Aerotek; TEKsystems; Aston Carter; Allegis Global Solutions; Major, Lindsey & Africa; Allegis Partners; MarketSource; Actalent (Formerly EASi); The Stamford Group; Getting Hired
- Website: allegisgroup.com

Allegis Group, Inc. is a multinational talent management firm headquartered in Hanover, Maryland, United States. As of 2018, it had US$13.4 billion in revenue, and 19,000 employees. It ranks fourth in the world after Adecco, Randstad and ManpowerGroup.

== History ==
Founded as Aerotek in 1983 by Jim C. Davis and Steve Bisciotti, the company originally focused on the engineering and aerospace industry. Bisciotti would go on to become owner of the Baltimore Ravens. As of January 2023, Jay Alvather serves as the Allegis Group CEO.

== Subsidiaries ==
Allegis Group's subsidiaries include:

- Aerotek
- Actalent (formerly Aerotek Engineering & Sciences and EASi)
- TEKsystems
- TEKsystems Global Services
- Aston Carter
- Allegis Global Solutions
- Major, Lindsey & Africa
- Allegis Partners
- MarketSource
- Getting Hired

Major, Lindsey & Africa

Major, Lindsey & Africa, a subsidiary of Allegis Group, is a legal and executive search firm, with headquarters in Hanover, Maryland. The firm was founded in 1982. Allegis Group acquired it in 2008. It has legal recruiters in major United States markets, and in a number of foreign markets.
