= Kickback (finance) =

Form of bribery in which payment is received for services rendered

A kickback is a payment that partially offsets a larger payment in another direction. The term often connotes a secret or illegal payment, such as a form of negotiated bribery in which a commission is secretly paid to the person who arranges a deal. Generally speaking, the remuneration (money, goods, or services handed over) for a kickback is negotiated ahead of time. The kickback varies from other kinds of bribes in that there is implied collusion between agents of the two parties, rather than one party extorting the bribe from the other. The purpose of the kickback is usually to encourage the other party to cooperate in the scheme.

The term "kickback" comes from colloquial English language, and describes the way a recipient of illegal gain "kicks back" a portion of it to another person for that person's assistance in obtaining it.

== Types and methods ==
The most common form of kickback involves a vendor submitting a fraudulent or inflated invoice (often for goods or services which were not needed, of inferior quality, or both), with an employee of the victim company assisting in securing payment. For their assistance in securing payment, the individual receives some sort of payment (cash, goods, services) or service.

"Kickback brokers" are individuals who may not receive the kickback personally, but who help link the individual or company providing the goods or services with individuals capable of assisting with the illegal payments. For helping to link the two colluding parties, either or both parties may make a payment to this "broker".

Kickbacks can be in return for recruitment.

== In government ==
Kickbacks are one of the most common forms of government corruption. In some cases, the kickback takes the form of a "cut of the action", and can be so well known as to be common knowledge—and even become part of a nation's culture. For example, in Indonesia, former dictator Suharto was publicly known as "Mr. Twenty-Five Percent" because he required that all major contracts throughout the nation provide him with 25 percent of the income before he would approve the contract. Also, in Pakistan, President Asif Ali Zardari was publicly known as "Mr. Ten Percent" for a similar reason; after coming into the government, he started taking 10% of all major contract investments before he would approve the contract. However, kickbacks differ from other forms of corruption, such as diversion of assets, as in embezzlement, because of the collusion between two parties.

In Italy, the political scene was realigned dramatically by the Tangentopoli scandals in the 1990s, which uncovered widespread use of kickbacks in the national and local governments.

== In health care ==
Kickback schemes can be pervasive. For example, in the United States, companies providing medical services to Medicare patients were paying doctors to send patients to them, whether or not the patient needed the treatment, diagnosis, or test. In 1986, the United States Congress passed the stringent Anti-Kickback Enforcement Act to prevent such schemes. The Anti-Kickback Statute ("AKS") prohibits medical providers and physicians from paying or receiving kickbacks or any financial benefits in return for referrals of patients who are covered under federal healthcare programs such as Medicare, Medicaid and TRICARE. However, shortly thereafter, the Office of Inspector General of the U.S. Department of Health and Human Services implemented two "safe harbor" exemptions to the Federal Antikickback Statute for "rebates" paid by pharmaceutical companies to Pharmacy Benefit Managers (PBMs) to secure preferred placement on drug formularies, and a second "safe harbor" exemption for Group Purchasing Organizations (GPOs). Lawmakers in both U.S. political parties have enabled these legally-exempted kickbacks to continue in the U.S. healthcare space.

== See also ==
- Annates
- Anti-competitive practices
- Baksheesh
- Bid rigging
- Charbonneau Commission
- Conflict of interest
- Fraud
- Political corruption § Kickbacks
- Tangentopoli

== Bibliography ==
- Albrecht, W. Steve; Albrecht, Conan C.; Albrecht, Chad O.; and Zimbelman, Mark F. Fraud Examination. Mason, Ohio: Cengage Learning, 2012.
- Buchbinder, Sharon B. and Shanks, Nancy H. Introduction to Health Care Management. Boston: Jones & Bartlett, 2007.
- Campos, Jose Edgardo. The Many Faces of Corruption: Tracking Vulnerabilities at the Sector Level. Washington, D.C.: World Bank, 2007.
- Kranacher, Mary-Jo; Riley, Richard; and Wells, Joseph T. Forensic Accounting and Fraud Examination. Hoboken, N.J.: Wiley, 2010.
