= Associated Catholic Charities =

Nonprofit organization

- Legal status: nonprofit organization
- Headquarters: Baltimore, Maryland, U.S.

Associated Catholic Charities is a nonprofit organization located in Baltimore, United States. Affiliated with the Archdiocese of Baltimore, it operates under the trade name, Catholic Charities of Baltimore, providing care for more than 160,000 people each year. It serves over a quarter million meals every year to the poor, and operates 80 charitable service programs in Baltimore City and Baltimore, Harford, Howard, Carroll, Anne Arundel, Frederick, Washington, and Garrett Counties of Maryland. The organization cares for children and families, people who are poor and disadvantaged, seniors, and those who have developmental disabilities.

== Services ==
Catholic Charities provides services to people of all faiths:

- children
- poor
- developmentally disabled
- elderly

The services provided include:

- adoptions
- advocacy
- behavioral health services
- crisis intervention
- employment placement
- employment preparedness training
- family support services
- food and meals
- Head Start programs (for pre-school children)
- immigration legal services
- residential treatment centers
- senior housing
- senior support services
- shelter (for men, women, children, and families)
- special education
- treatment foster care

== Donors ==
87% of total expenditures went directly toward program services during the fiscal year ending June 30, 2011.

== Volunteers ==
The agency has a permanent staff of about 2,000, and 15,000 volunteers to provide services for more than 160,000 people.

== Geography ==
Associated Catholic Charities provides services within the geographic boundaries of the Archdiocese of Baltimore–Baltimore City and Baltimore, Harford, Howard, Carroll, Anne Arundel, Frederick, Washington, and Garrett Counties of Maryland. Most donors, volunteers, employees and clients come from the same area, though some come from outside the Archdiocese.

== History ==
Catholic Charities began with the establishment of the Catholic Church in America. John Carroll, the first Bishop of Baltimore, declared in 1792 that one-third of all parish revenues should go to “the relief of the poor.” In the mid-19th century, services focused on caring for orphaned immigrant children. The first program, St. Vincent's Orphanage, opened in 1856. Over the next century, homes for such children were established by the Archdiocese, as Baltimore became the point of entry for more 19th century immigrants than any other U.S. city outside of New York.

In 1923, the Archdiocese incorporated all of the children's orphanages under a new “Bureau of Catholic Charities” and the care of disadvantaged people became the mission of Catholic Charities, which continues today. Over the next century, the orphanage focus changed as the need for treating neglected and abused children and those with emotional disabilities became greater. As a result, St. Vincent's Center and Villa Maria opened in Dulaney Valley in the 1960s.

Catholic Charities became innovators in developing programs for people with developmental disabilities through the establishment of the Francis X. Gallagher Center in the 1970s. Also located in Dulaney Valley, both the residential and day programs have grown and now have multiple locations.

In the following decade, the agency expanded to include programs for poor, homeless, and unemployed people. Our Daily Bread, a daily hot meal program, opened its doors in 1981 and has never missed a day of service since. Our Daily Bread has become Catholic Charities’ most well-known program, involving thousands of volunteers from around the region. These individuals respond by providing and serving the vast majority of the nearly quarter million meals each year. As the necessity arose, additional programs opened to serve the related needs of the homeless men (Christopher Place Employment Academy) and women (My Sister's Place).

In the 1980s, Catholic Charities began evolving into one of Baltimore's largest providers of services for seniors. The first of 18 independent living apartment communities for seniors, Basilica Place, opened in 1980. The agency transformed the Jenkins Memorial Home into what is today the Jenkins Senior Living Community, a campus that includes two independent senior living apartment buildings (St. Joachim House and DePaul House), St. Ann Adult Day Services, Caritas House Assisted Living, and St. Elizabeth Rehabilitation and Nursing Center.

In June 2007, Catholic Charities opened Our Daily Bread Employment Center.

== See also ==
- Catholic Charities
- Catholic Charities of the Archdiocese of Chicago
- Roman Catholic Archdiocese of Miami
- Roman Catholicism in the United States
