= Surface Transportation Assistance Act (1982) =

1982 United States law

Surface Transportation Assistance Act of 1982
- Long title: A bill to authorize appropriations for construction of certain highways in accordance with title 23, United States Code, for highway safety, for mass transportation in urban and rural areas, and for other purposes.
- Acronyms (colloquial): STAA
- Enacted by: the 97th United States Congress
- Effective: April 1, 1983

Citations
- Public law: Pub. L. 97–424
- Statutes at Large: 96 Stat. 2097

Codification
- Titles amended: 23 U.S.C.: Highways

Legislative history
- Introduced in the House as H.R. 6211 by Glenn M. Anderson (D-CA) on April 29, 1982; Passed the House on December 6, 1982 (262-143); Passed the Senate on December 21, 1982 (56-34); Reported by the joint conference committee on December 21, 1982; agreed to by the House on December 21, 1982 (180-87) and by the Senate on December 23, 1982 (54-33); Signed into law by President Ronald Reagan on January 6, 1983

The Surface Transportation Assistance Act of 1982 was a comprehensive transportation funding and policy act of the United States Federal Government, 96 Stat. 2097. The legislation was championed by the Reagan administration to address concerns about the surface transportation infrastructure (highways and bridges). The Act contained Title V, known as the Highway Revenue Act of 1982, which added five cents to the per gallon gas tax (the first such increase since 1961), of which four cents was dedicated to restore interstate highways and bridges, and one cent for public transit. The Act also set a goal of 10 percent for participation of disadvantaged business enterprises in federal-aid projects.

== Section 165: "Buy America" Act ==
Section 165 (49 U.S.C. § 5323j), called the "Buy America" provision or Buy America Act—not to be confused with the 1933-enacted Buy American Act—applies to mass-transit-related procurements. It established requirements intended to give preference to the use of domestically produced materials on any procurements funded at least in part by federal funds. Implementation of the requirements is regulated by the Federal Transit Administration.

== Section 405 ==
Effective in 1983, Section 405 (49 U.S.C. § 31105) was enacted to encourage employee reporting of noncompliance with safety regulations governing commercial motor vehicles. Congress recognized that employees in the transportation industry are often best able to detect safety violations and yet, because they may be threatened with discharge for cooperating with enforcement agencies, they need express protection against retaliation for reporting these violations. See, e. g., 128 Cong. Rec. 32698 (1982) (remarks of Sen. Percy); id., at 32509–32510 (remarks of Sen. Danforth). Section 405 protects employee "whistle-blowers" by forbidding discharge, discipline, or other forms of discrimination by the employer in response to an employee's complaining about or refusing to operate motor vehicles that do not meet the applicable safety standards.

Congress also recognized that the employee's protection against having to choose between operating an unsafe vehicle and losing his job would lack practical effectiveness if the [481 U.S. 252, 259] employee could not be reinstated pending complete review. The longer a discharged employee remains unemployed, the more devastating are the consequences to his personal financial condition and prospects for reemployment. Ensuring the eventual recovery of backpay may not alone provide sufficient protection to encourage reports of safety violations. Accordingly, 405 incorporates additional protections, authorizing temporary reinstatement based on a preliminary finding of reasonable cause to believe that the employee has suffered a retaliatory discharge. The statute reflects a careful balancing of the relative interests of the Government, employee, and employer. It evidences a legislative determination that the preliminary investigation and finding of reasonable cause by the Secretary, if followed "expeditiously" by a hearing on the record at the employer's request, provide effective protection to the employee and ensure fair consideration of the employer's interest in making unimpaired hiring decisions.

Truck drivers who believe they have suffered retaliation for reporting violations, refusing to commit violations, or participating in proceedings, can seek relief from the U.S. Department of Labor. Under STAA, truck drivers who believe they have suffered an adverse employment action (such as discharge, demotion, discipline, or denial of advancement), have 180 days to file a simple written complaint with Occupational Safety and Health Administration (OSHA). The complaint can be postmarked or faxed to meet the deadline. If OSHA determines that a violation did occur, it can issue a preliminary order requiring reinstatement during further proceedings. Both sides will have an opportunity to present their evidence in a recorded hearing before an administrative law judge (ALJ). The ALJ's decision is reviewed by the Administrative Review Board, and parties can appeal to federal courts of appeals.

In 1987, the U.S. Supreme Court ruled in Brock v. Roadway Express, Inc., 481 U.S. 252, that due process requires that employers receive prereinstatement notice of the employee's allegations, notice of the substance of the relevant supporting evidence, an opportunity to submit a written response, and an opportunity to meet with the investigator and present statements from rebuttal witnesses. These procedures provide a reliable initial check against mistaken decisions

== Sections 411–412: National Truck Network ==
Sections 411 and 412 (49 U.S.C. §§ 31111–31114) first authorized the establishment of a national network of highways designated for use by large trucks. On these highways, federal weight, width and length limits apply. The National Network includes almost all of the Interstate Highway System and other, specified non-Interstate highways. Section 412 also specifically prohibits any state from denying reasonable access to the National Network. Provisions in the Intermodal Surface Transportation Efficiency Act of 1991 further defined the National Network.

Trucks that are within the width and length limits specified in the Act are now referred to as "STAA trucks".

== See also ==
- Surface Transportation and Uniform Relocation Assistance Act
