= Buy America Act =

US federal law protecting domestic materials providers for transport projects

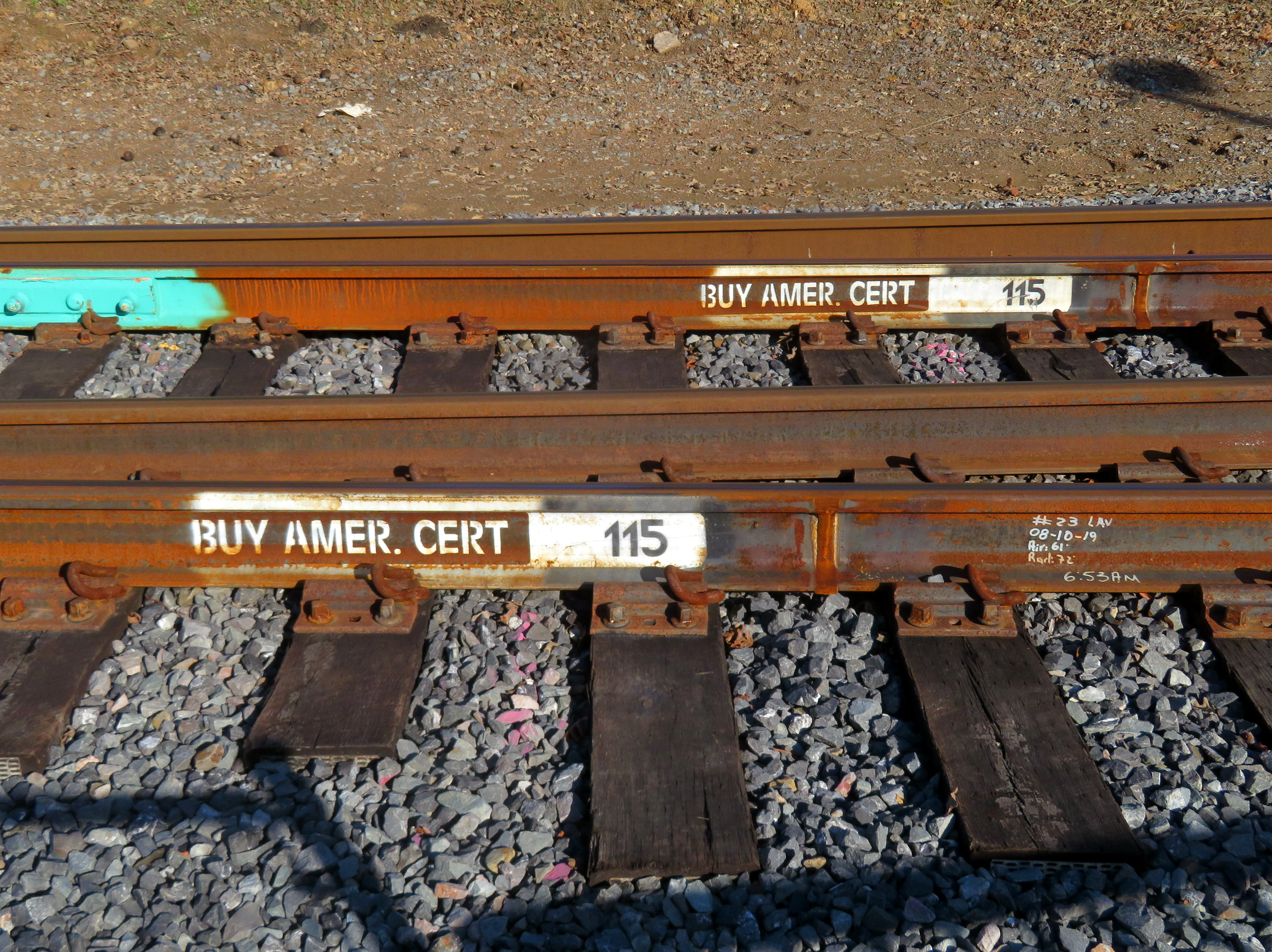
BUY AMER. CERT (Buy America Certified) stenciled on tracks of the Sonoma–Marin Area Rail Transit system, which was partially funded with federal grants

Section 165 (49 U.S.C. § 5323(j)) of the Surface Transportation Assistance Act of 1982 (commonly called the Buy America Act) is a section of the larger STAA that deals with purchases related to rail or road transportation. Unlike the similarly titled Buy American Act (1933), the Buy America Act applies only to purchases related to rail or road transportation, such as the construction of highways, railways, or rapid transit systems. The 1982 provisions also apply to purchases made by third-party agencies, using funds granted by agencies within the United States Department of Transportation.

Transportation infrastructure projects built with iron, steel, and manufactured products must purchase materials in the United States. This applies to mass-transit related procurements valued over $150,000 and funded at least in part by federal grants. This includes highways, bridges, airports and tunnels.

Canadian manufacturers, as joint signatories to NAFTA (and its successor, the USMCA) as well as the World Trade Organization's Agreement on Government Procurement (GPA), are often eligible to be considered equivalent to US manufacturers, though NAFTA excluded highway and transit grants from its coverage, and while the GPA agreement obliges the governments of 37 US states to treat Canadian products as equivalent to US products, the GPA also excludes highway and transit grants that are Federally funded.

The Buy America rules are occasionally amended by the Federal Transit Administration and the Federal Highway Administration.

According to the Associated General Contractors of Washington, elements of the American Recovery and Reinvestment Act of 2009 conflicted with the Buy America provisions of the Surface Transportation Assistance Act of 1982, although the legislation specified that the existing Buy America requirements would extend to ARRA-funded highway and transit projects.
