= Buy American Act =

Requires the U.S. government to prefer U.S.-made products

- Other short titles: Buy American Act of 1933
- Long title: An Act making appropriations for the Treasury and Post Office Departments for the fiscal year ending June 30, 1934, and for other purposes.
- Acronyms (colloquial): BAA
- Nicknames: Treasury and Post Office Departments Appropriations Act of 1933
- Enacted by: the 72nd United States Congress
- Effective: March 3, 1933

Citations
- Public law: Pub. L. 72–428
- Statutes at Large: 47 Stat. 1489 aka 47 Stat. 1520

Codification
- Titles amended: 41 U.S.C.: Public Contracts
- U.S.C. sections created: 41 U.S.C. §§ 8301–8303

Legislative history
- Introduced in the House as H.R. 13520 by Joseph W. Byrns Sr. (D–TN) on December 10, 1932; Committee consideration by House Appropriations; Passed the House on December 15, 1932 (Passed); Passed the Senate on February 7, 1933 (Passed); Reported by the joint conference committee on February 10, 1933; agreed to by the House on March 1, 1933 (Agreed) and by the Senate on March 3, 1933 (Agreed); Signed into law by President Herbert Hoover on March 3, 1933

The Buy American Act (originally 41 U.S.C. §§ 10a–10d, now 41 U.S.C. §§ 8301–8305) passed in 1933 by the Congress and signed by President Herbert Hoover on his last full day in office (March 3, 1933). It required the United States government to prefer U.S.-made products in its purchases.

== History ==
The Buy American Act, passed in 1933 by the Congress and signed by President Herbert Hoover on his last full day in office (March 3, 1933), required the United States government to prefer U.S.-made products in its purchases. It was originally enacted as 41 U.S.C. §§ 10a–10d, and as of 2011 is 41 U.S.C. §§ 8301–8305, after it was organized as positive law in chapter 83 of Title 41 of the United States Code.

== Waivers ==
In certain government procurements, the requirement purchase may be waived by the Contracting Officer or the Head of the Contracting Activity (HCA) if the domestic product is 25% or more expensive than an identical foreign-sourced product, if the product is not available domestically in sufficient quantity or quality, or if doing so is in the public's interest.

The President has the authority to waive the Buy American Act within the terms of a reciprocal agreement or otherwise in response to the provision of reciprocal treatment to U.S. producers. Under the 1979 General Agreement on Tariffs and Trade (GATT) Government Procurement Code, the U.S.–Israel Free Trade Agreement, the U.S.–Canada Free Trade Agreement, and the World Trade Organization (WTO) 1996 Agreement on Government Procurement (GPA), the United States provides access to the government procurement of certain U.S. agencies for goods from the other parties to those agreements. However, the Buy American Act was excluded from the GPA's coverage.

== Legacy ==
Other pieces of federal legislation extend similar requirements to third-party purchases that utilize federal funds, such as highway and transit programs. In July 2024, the Congress passed the All-American Flag Act requiring U.S. government to buy only U.S.-made American flags, 41 U.S.C. § 6310.

The Buy American Act is not to be confused with the very similarly named Buy America Act that came into effect 50 years later. The latter, a provision of the Surface Transportation Assistance Act of 1982, is 49 U.S.C., § 5323 (j), and applies only to mass-transit-related procurements valued over US$100,000 and funded at least in part by federal grants.

== See also ==
- Berry Amendment
- Trade Agreements Act of 1979
- Made in USA
- American nationalism
- All-American Flag Act
