= Walsh–Healey Public Contracts Act of 1936 =

Walsh–Healey Public Contracts Act
- Other short titles: Walsh–Healey Act
- Long title: An Act To provide conditions for the purchase of supplies and the making of contracts by the United States, and for other purposes
- Enacted by: the 74th United States Congress

Citations
- Public law: Pub. L. 74–805
- Statutes at Large: 49 Stat. 2036

Codification
- Titles amended: 41

Legislative history
- Introduced in the House as H.R. 11550 by Francis D. Culkin; Committee consideration by House Judiciary; Passed the House on; Passed the Senate on; Signed into law by President Franklin D. Roosevelt on June 30, 1936

The Walsh–Healey Public Contracts Act of 1936 (41 USC §§6501-6511) is a United States labor law, passed as part of the New Deal. It is a law on basic labor rights for U.S. government contracts. It was intended to improve labor standards.

== Contents ==
The Walsh-Healey Act that applies to U.S. government contracts exceeding $15,000 for the manufacturing or furnishing of goods. Walsh-Healey establishes overtime pay for hours worked by contractor employees in excess of 40 hours per week, and sets the minimum wage equal to the prevailing wage as determined by the Secretary of Labor. The law prohibits the employment of youths less than 16 years of age and convicts (only those currently in prison), except under certain conditions. The act sets standards for the use of convict labor, and job health and safety standards. The Walsh-Healey Act does not apply to commercial items.

== Background ==
The act was named for its Congressional sponsors, both Massachusetts Democrats, Senator David I. Walsh and Representative Arthur Healey.

The act was based on Executive Order 6246, issued by President Franklin D. Roosevelt on August 10, 1933, which required government contractors to comply with codes of fair competition issued under the National Industrial Recovery Act (NIRA). This became moot when the Supreme Court struck down the NIRA in Schechter Poultry Corp. v. United States (1935).

== See also ==
- US labor law
- Fair Labor Standards Act of 1938
- Davis–Bacon Act of 1931
- Title 41 of the United States Code
