= Clearswift =

British technology company

Clearswift Limited
- Clearswift logo as of 2020
- Type: Private
- Industry: Computer security
- Founded: 1982; United Kingdom
- Headquarters: Theale, Berkshire, UK
- Number of locations: UK, USA, Germany, Japan, Australia
- Area served: Worldwide
- Products: Secure Email Gateway, Secure Web Gateway, Secure File Gateway, Secure ICAP Gateway, Secure Exchange Gateway, Critical Information Protection Server & Agent, ARgon for Email
- Services: Product support, Security consulting
- Revenue: £20.8m (2012)
- Parent: Fortra
- Website: http://www.clearswift.com/

Clearswift is an information security company based in the UK. It offers cyber-security services to protect business's data from internal and external threats.

The company is owned by Fortra, a cyber-security company based in Eden Prairie, Minnesota.

== History ==
Clearswift was founded as NET-TEL in 1982. One of the co-founders, John Horton, had previously worked at GEC and Acorn Computers.

In 1988, NET-TEL launched Route400, the world's first mail client for MS-DOS (using the X.400 protocol). It was later ported to other platforms.

In 1998, NET-TEL switched its main business to content filtering, as the popularity of the Microsoft Exchange Client took away the mail client market.

In 2001, NET-TEL was rebranded as Clearswift, after a round of venture capital fundraising.

In 2002, Clearswift acquired Content Technologies from Baltimore Technologies, along with the MIMEsweeper brand.

Clearswift extended the MIMEsweeper line to include web and instant messaging filtering. These were marketed as protecting against the leakage of confidential company information on social networking sites - Clearswift argues that instead of banning Web 2.0 sites and services entirely, businesses can actually gain a competitive advantage by making use of them, provided their use is monitored.

In 2003, the company received $6.07 million from its shareholders, including venture capital funds managed by Amadeus Capital Partners, BA Capital Partners, Cazenove Private Equity, and Kennet Partners. Also, it was reported that Clearswift were the providers of a new email filtering system at the House of Commons, responsible for blocking Welsh language emails as "inappropriate content", and preventing MPs receiving copies of a Sexual Offences Bill. Clearswift would not confirm that the House of Commons was a customer, citing customer confidentiality reasons.

In April 2005 Clearswift began to market an SMTP appliance (email gateway) based upon the technology.

In January 2008, failure to renew a domain name caused loss of email services to 5% of Clearswift's customers.

In Dec 2009, Clearswift sold the Deep-Secure, Bastion and Flashpoint products in to a spin-off company, "Deep Secure".

In November 2011, Clearswift was sold to Lyceum Capital.

In August 2012, Clearswift acquired Jedda Systems Pty Ltd.

In February 2013, Clearswift acquired Microdasys in order to strengthen its web product line.

In January 2017, Clearswift was acquired by Swiss defense company RUAG as part of its RUAG Defence Cyber division.

In December 2019, Clearswift was acquired by HelpSystems to expand its cybersecurity portfolio. HelpSystems rebranded as Fortra in November 2022.

== Research & development ==
Clearswift has its main engineering office based in Arlington Business Park (Theale, UK). A smaller engineering office is in Adelaide, Australia which was part of the Jedda acquisition.
