= Anti-Kickback Enforcement Act =

Anti-Kickback Enforcement Act of 1986
- Long title: An Act to strengthen the prohibition of kickbacks relating to subcontracts under Federal Government contracts
- Enacted by: the 99th United States Congress
- Effective: November 7, 1986

Citations
- Public law: Pub. L. 99–634
- Statutes at Large: 100 Stat. 3523

Codification
- Acts amended: An Act To eliminate the practice by subcontractors, under cost-plus-a-fixed-fee or cost reimbursable contacts of the United States, of paying fees or kick-backs, or of granting gifts or gratuities to employees of a cost-plus-a-fixed-fee or cost reimbursable prime contractors or of higher tier subcontractors for the purpose of securing the award of subcontracts or orders. (Pub. L. 79–319, 60 Stat. 37, enacted March 8, 1946
- Titles amended: 41
- U.S.C. sections created: 41 U.S.C. ch. 87

Legislative history
- Introduced in the Senate as S. 2250 by Carl Levin (D–MI) on March 26, 1986; Passed the Senate on September 12, 1986 (passed); Passed the House of Representatives on October 7, 1986 (passed) with amendment; Senate agreed to House of Representatives amendment on October 15, 1986 (passed); Signed into law by President Ronald Reagan on November 7, 1986

The Anti-Kickback Enforcement Act of 1986 (Pub. L. 99–634, 100 Stat. 3523, enacted November 7, 1986, originally codified at 41 U.S.C. § 51 et seq., recodified at 41 U.S.C. ch. 87) modernized and closed the loopholes of previous statutes applying to government contractors.

== Intent ==
The law attempts to make the anti-kickback statute a more useful prosecutorial tool by expanding the definition of prohibited conduct and by making the statute applicable to a broader range of persons involved in government subcontracting.

== See also ==
- Title 41 of the United States Code
