= Prevailing wage =

Legal concept

In United States government contracting, a prevailing wage is defined as the hourly wage, usual benefits and overtime, paid to the majority of workers, laborers, and mechanics within a particular area. This is usually the union wage.

Prevailing wages are established by regulatory agencies for each trade and occupation employed in the performance of public work, as well as by State Departments of Labor or their equivalents.

Prevailing wage may also include other payments such as apprenticeship and industry promotion.

In the United States, the Davis–Bacon Act of 1931 and related amendments pertain to federally funded projects. There are also 32 states that have state prevailing wage laws, also known as "little Davis–Bacon Acts". The rules and regulations vary from state to state.

As of 2016, the prevailing wage requirement, codified in the Davis–Bacon Act, increases the cost of federal construction projects by an average of $1.4 billion per year.

== History ==
"Prevailing wages" were first established shortly after the Civil War in 1866 when the National Labor Union called on Congress to mandate an eight-hour workday. In 1869, President Grant issued a proclamation establishing the 8-hour day for government workers. Although the Congress had not yet established its authority to regulate private economic matters because of prevailing legal doctrines, it could regulate its own contracts and the targeted public works as a means to indirectly influence other labor markets.

In 1891, Kansas was the first state to pass a "prevailing wage" for its own public works projects, and over the next thirty years was followed by seven other states (New York 1894, Oklahoma 1909, Idaho 1911, Arizona 1912, New Jersey 1913, Massachusetts 1914, and Nebraska 1923) in establishing minimum labor standards for public works construction. In the midst of the Great Depression, beginning in 1931 and prior to the end of World War II, twenty additional states passed their own prevailing wage laws. In 1931 Congress passed the Davis–Bacon Act after 14 earlier attempts, the Federal Prevailing Wage law that remains in force, bar a few suspensions, to this day.

== Implementation ==
=== United States ===
Federal rates are calculated based on regulations established by the US Department of Labor. According to Code of Federal Regulations, "The prevailing wage shall be the wage paid to the majority (more than 50 percent) of the laborers or mechanics in the classification on similar projects in the area during the period in question. If the same wage is not paid to a majority of those employed in the classification, the prevailing wage shall be the average of the wages paid, weighted by the total employed in the classification." State level rates are calculated using various methods including an average of all wage rates paid, the mode, or based on collectively bargained rates.

The H-1B visa program requires employers to "pay the prevailing wage or the actual wage paid by the employer to workers with similar skills and qualifications, whichever is higher".

In the Davis–Bacon Act all federal government construction contracts, and most contracts for federally assisted construction over $2,000, must include provisions for paying workers on-site no less than the locally prevailing wages and benefits paid on similar projects. The Streamlining Claims Processing for Federal Contractor Employees Act (H.R. 2747; 113th Congress), if passed, would make the United States Department of Labor responsible for enforcing this act (instead of the Government Accountability Act) and ensuring that federal contractors did receive the prevailing wage.

In the Walsh–Healey Public Contracts Act (1936) the federal government set the minimum wage equal to the prevailing wage in an area.

==== State‑level efforts ====
In Ohio, the Affiliated Construction Trades of Ohio (ACT Ohio) has actively opposed legislative efforts to weaken the state's prevailing wage law. In 2017, the organization's executive director testified against bills that would allow local governments to opt out of paying prevailing wages, arguing that such changes would reduce worker incomes, harm apprenticeship programs, and push many construction workers below the poverty line.

== Economics ==
=== Federal level ===
According to the non-partisan federal Congressional Budget Office, as of 2016 the Davis–Bacon Act increases the cost of federal construction projects by an average of $1.4 billion per year ($13 billion over 9 years).

=== California ===
In California, prevailing wage increases the cost of construction, with workers paid prevailing wage making approximately 50% more in hourly rates, and getting approximately double the benefits of non-prevailing wage workers. The contribution of prevailing wage requirements to overall construction costs has been estimated to be as large as a 40% increase in costs.

A 2020 UC Berkeley study of government subsidized affordable housing projects in California found that prevailing wage requirements increased the cost of construction by 13%, or $50,000 per unit.

== Support ==
Supporters of prevailing wage requirements argue that it keeps the earnings of construction workers high and maintains the quality of construction work. Supporters also argue that "if one of the objectives of federal projects is to increase earnings for the local population", then the requirement "prevents out-of-town firms from coming into a locality, using lower-paid workers from other areas of the country to compete with local contractors for federal work, and then leaving the area upon completion of the work" and prevents race to the bottom effects. Supporters point to research indicating that "prevailing wage laws boost worker productivity, reduce injury rates, and increase apprenticeship training, which helps to address the shortage of skilled labor in construction" and additionally argue that prevailing wage requirements narrows racial pay gaps.

The major supporters of the prevailing wage requirements include labor unions, such as the AFL–CIO.

== Opposition ==
Opponents of prevailing wage laws suggest that such laws hurt free market competition and cause costs to escalate on public projects, as many calculations to determine the prevailing wage tend to identify union wages and benefits as the benchmark in a given community. They suggest that this does not lead to any tangible benefit to justify the increased cost, either increasing the amount of taxes or decreasing the number of public projects that may be undertaken.

Opponents also state that since the 1930s, other policies (a federal minimum wage) have been put in place to guarantee construction workers a minimum wage. They also point out that the higher wages paid under this policy distort construction projects by incentivizing them to use more capital and less labor, thereby reducing the employment of construction workers. The federal paperwork requirement is also seen to discriminate against small firms.

== See also ==
- Compensation of employees
- Employment
- Labour in Economics
- Living wage
- Labor power
- McNamara–O'Hara Service Contract Act
- Wage labour
- Wage share
- Wage slavery
- Working class
