= Harvest Partners =

American private equity firm

- Company type: Private
- Industry: Private Equity
- Founded: 1981; 45 years ago
- Founder: Harvey Mallement; Harvey Wertheim
- Headquarters: New York City, United States
- Products: Leveraged buyout; Growth capital
- AUM: $7.0 billion
- Website: www.harvestpartners.com

Harvest Partners is a private equity firm focused on leveraged buyout and growth capital investments in middle market industrial, business services, consumer and retail companies.

The firm, which was founded in 1981 by Harvey Mallement and Harvey Wertheim, is based in New York City. Prior to co-founding Harvest, Mallement was managing partner of Masco Associates, making private equity investments on behalf of Masco Corporation and Wertheim managed venture capital and private equity investment activities at Research and Science Investors, a venture capital and investment management firm.

In October 2018, Goldman Sachs Asset Management's Petershill program made a strategic minority investment in Harvest Partners representing 15 percent of the firm.

Source: Private Equity Intelligence
