= Contract Work Hours and Safety Standards Act =

United States federal law

86th United States Congress
- Long title: An Act to establish labor standards for certain contractors and subcontractors on federal service and construction contracts.
- Enacted by: 86th United States Congress
- Enacted: September 13, 1962

Summary
- The Contract Work Hours and Safety Standards Act (CWHSSA) is a federal law that sets labor standards for contractors and subcontractors working on federal service contracts and federally assisted construction contracts exceeding $100,000. It requires the payment of overtime (one and one-half times the basic rate) for work exceeding 40 hours per workweek and mandates safe and sanitary working conditions on such projects.

The Contract Work Hours and Safety Standards Act (CWHSSA) is a United States federal law that covers hours and safety standards in construction contracts.

The Act applies to federal service contracts and federal and federally assisted construction contracts worth over $100,000, and requires contractors and subcontractors on covered contracts to pay laborers and mechanics employed in the performance of the contracts one and one-half times their basic rate of pay for all hours worked over 40 in a workweek. This Act also prohibits unsanitary, hazardous, or dangerous working conditions on federal and federally financed and assisted construction projects.
