= McNamara–O'Hara Service Contract Act =

The McNamara–O'Hara Service Contract Act of 1965 (SCA), codified at 41 U.S.C. §§ 6701–6707, is a US labor law that requires government to use its bargaining power to ensure fair wages for workers when it buys services from private contractors.

== Contents ==
The Act requires general contractors and subcontractors performing services on prime contracts in excess of $2,500 to pay service employees in various classes no less than the wage rates and fringe benefits found prevailing in the locality as determined by the United States Department of Labor, or the rates contained in a predecessor contractor's collective bargaining agreement. This is also known as the prevailing wage.

The SCA applies to every contract entered into by the United States or the District of Columbia, the principal purpose of which is to furnish services to the United States through the use of service employees. The SCA requires contractors and subcontractors performing services on covered federal or District of Columbia contracts in excess of $2,500 to pay service employees in various classes no less than the monetary wage rates and to furnish fringe benefits found prevailing in the locality, or the rates (including prospective increases) contained in a predecessor contractor's collective bargaining agreement. Safety and health standards also apply to such contracts.

== See also ==
- US labor law
- Davis–Bacon Act
- Worker's compensation
- Minimum wage
- Living wage
- Prevailing wage
- Title 41 of the United States Code
