= CEMS =

CEMS may refer to:

- Capillary electrophoresis–mass spectrometry
- Conversion electron Mössbauer spectroscopy
- Continuous emissions monitoring system
- CEMS – The Global Alliance in Management Education, since 1988
- CEMS, Inc. v. United States, a government contracting suit
- Church of England Men's Society
- Rochester Area Colleges Center for Excellence in Math and Science, in Rochester, NY
- Cleveland Emergency Medical Services
