= Adjustment (law) =

Law term

According to the law, the term adjustment may appear in varied contexts, as a synonym for terms with unrelated definitions:

== General Definition ==
Adjust:

1. To settle or to bring to a satisfactory state, so that the parties are agreed in the result; as, to adjust accounts.
2. When applied to a liquidated demand, the verb "adjust" has the same meaning as the word "settle" in the same connection, and means to pay the demand. When applied to an unliquidated demand, it means to ascertain the amount due or to settle. In the latter connection, to settle means to effect a mutual adjustment between the parties and to agree upon the balance.

== Common Uses ==
=== General Debt ===
- Debtor and creditor adjustment: As the term appears in an assignment for the benefit of creditors, "Creditor" means one who has a definite demand against the assignor, or a cause of action capable of adjustment and liquidation at trial. 6 Am J2d Assign for Crs § 109.
- Adjustable Rate Loan: Loan arrangement which permits the lender to change the interest rate based on a specific factor such as the prime lending rate charged by banks.
- Adjusting agency: In one sense, a collection agency; in another sense, an agency representing a debtor in making an arrangement with his creditors for the settlement of his obligations by modification of the indebtedness. AUTHORITY: 15 Am J2d Collect §§ 1, 2.
- Adjusted Balance Method: Method used by a credit card issuer to compute the balance on which a debtor must pay interest. The adjusted balance method determines the outstanding balance at the beginning of the current billing cycle and then deducts payments made during that cycle.
- Cap: Limit placed on the amount an interest rate or monthly payment can increase during an adjustment period or over the life of an adjustable rate loan.

=== Insurance ===
- Insurance adjustment, the settlement of an insurance claim; the determination for the purposes of a settlement of the amount of a claim, particularly a claim against an insurance company, giving consideration to objections made by the debtor or insurance company, as well as the allegations of the claimant in support of his claim. Adjustment of claims is not confined to claims against insurance companies. An allowance made by a creditor, particularly a storekeeper, in response to a complaint by the debtor respecting the accuracy of the account or other claim, or a reduction in the claim or account made to induce a prompt payment, is in a proper sense an adjustment.
- Adjustment clause, in an insurance policy.
- Public adjuster: One whose business is the adjustment of claims for insurance, employed, not regularly for full-time by one person or company, but by members of the public as their need of an adjuster arises. A public adjuster is hired by the insured only and can only represent the interest of the insured, not the insurance company. A public adjuster's allegiance on handling the claim is to the insured, not the insurance company. A public adjuster is required to be licensed by the State Department of Insurance in the state in which the public adjuster is handling claims. Source- NAIC
- Adjuster: A person who makes a determination of a claim, especially a claim against an insurance company, and objections made thereto by the debtor or insurance company, for the purpose of arriving at an amount for which the claim will be settled. Sometimes acting as the agent of the insurance company or debtor, at other times as the agent of the claimant.

Staff Adjuster- a staff adjuster works for one insurance company, typically in their internal claim's department. A staff adjuster's allegiance on handling the claim is to the insurance company, not the insured. A staff adjuster is not always required to be licensed by the State Department of Insurance in the state they are working as the insurer typically holds a license with the state department of insurance which allows the insurer to regulate their own staff adjusters.

Independent Adjuster- an independent adjuster works for many insurance companies, typically on a contractual at need basis. An independent adjuster may represent the interest of multiple insurance companies at the same time. An independent adjuster's allegiance on handling the claim is to the insurance company, not the insured. An independent adjuster is not always required to be licensed by the State Department of Insurance in the state they are working as this varies state to state and is regulated by the state department of insurance. During emergency situations, especially when the Governor of a State or the Present of the United States declares a state of emergency, independent adjusters are typically granted temporary licenses to assist insurers in handling an influx of claims.

=== Accounting ===
- “Accounting”: An action, usually on the equity side, to secure an adjustment of complicated accounts. Making amends or restitution.
- To determine: To terminate; to cease; to end. To put an end to controversy by deciding the issue or issues, by making a settlement, or by adjustment. Same as "hear and determine" when used by statute with reference to court action, but meaning merely "ascertain," where used in matters not pertaining to judicial process.

=== Principles of Law ===
- “Equity delights in amicable adjustments.” TEXT: A maxim of equity; a maxim addressed to the judicial conscience and intended to govern the court in the determination of disputes between litigants. AUTHORITY: Troll v Spencer, 238 Mo 81, 141 SW 855.
- Settlement in pais: A settlement or adjustment of differences between the parties themselves, out of court.
- Composition, "the adjustment of a debt, or avoidance of an obligation or liability, by some form of compensation agreed on between the parties". This noun corresponds to the verb to compound, q.v., and often means merely "a compounding." E.g., "If a slave killed a freeman, he was to be surrendered for one half of the composition to the relatives of the slain man, and the master was to pay the other half." O.W. Holmes, The Common Law 17 (1881; repr. 1946).
- A contribution, or adjustment of loss.

=== Immigration ===
- Adjustment of Status: Transition from a non-immigrant visa status to an immigrant visa status. Some non-immigrants already in the United States can become lawful permanent residents without having to travel abroad to receive an immigrant visa from a consul. Marrying a United States citizen is one of the commonly employed techniques used by non-immigrants to achieve a status adjustment.

=== Labor Law ===
- Cost of Living Adjustment: C.O.L.A. – Provision in a contract or law providing benefits which grants an automatic monetary increase that is directly tied to increases in the cost of living. This automatic increase is used in determining federal pensions, military pensions, and some veterans benefits. The C.O.L.A. may also affect the private economy in the form of rent increases, salary decisions, and even court settlements. Cost of living is usually measured by the CPI.
- Zone Pricing: Adjustment of prices based on transportation costs so prices are uniform within a certain geographic area.
- Conciliation. The adjustment of disputes in a friendly manner, or, if not in a friendly manner, at least without violence. One of the primary examples of conciliation is the adjustment of labor disputes without a strike or an extended strike.

=== Taxes ===
- Adjusted basis: For income tax purposes, the original cost or other original basis adjusted for such things as casualty losses, improvements, and depreciation, when appropriate.
- Adjusted gross income: A tax-law term for gross income less the deductions permitted by law.

=== Real Estate ===
- Price Level Adjusted Mortgage; P.L.A.M: Mortgage allowing a buyer to pay a fixed rate of real interest on a principal that is adjusted for inflation every year.
- Adjustable Rate Mortgage; A.R.M.; Variable Rate Mortgage: Mortgage with an interest rate which changes based on a method stated in the mortgage.

=== Business ===
- Adjusted Trading: Process by which a loss on a security may be deferred by a vendor selling a security to another vendor at a price above its current market value while simultaneously agreeing to repurchase from that same vendor another security at a price above its current market value.
- United States Bankruptcy Code: Chapter 9 concerns the adjusting of debts of a municipality. Chapter 11 relates to reorganization and is primarily designed for businesses although individuals are also eligible for relief. This chapter provides for the rehabilitation of a financially distressed business enterprise by adjusting its debt obligations and equity interests.
- Contract adjustment
- Equitable adjustment: In government contracting.
- Claim agent: An employee of a railroad company, a business, or an industry, whose duty it is to investigate claims made against his employer and report to the employer whether a claim should be paid, denied, or adjusted.
- Change Order: Written order to a contractor that is signed by the owner and the architect and is issued after the execution of a contract. The change order authorizes a change in the work or an adjustment in the contract sum>. A change order may add to, subtract from, or vary the scope of work.
