= Fort Polk =

US Army post near Leesville, LA

Coordinates: 31.072638°N 93.080635°W

Fort James H. Polk & The Joint Readiness Training Center
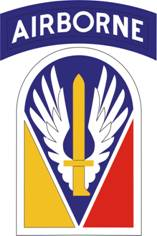
- Joint Readiness Training Center and Joint Readiness Training Center Operations Group shoulder sleeve insignia
- Founded: 1941; 85 years ago
- Country: United States
- Allegiance: United States Army Transformation and Training Command
- Branch: United States Army
- Type: Training post
- Role: Joint Readiness Training Center
- Part of: United States Army Combined Arms Command
- Motto: The Home of Heroes

Commanders
- Current commander: MG Jason A. Curl
- Command Sergeant Major: CSM Oracio Peña
- Notable commanders: Philip C. Wehle

Insignia
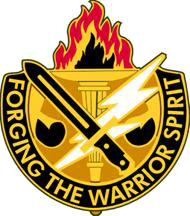
- Distinctive unit insignia

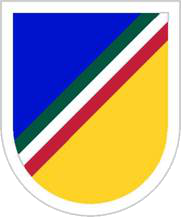
- Beret flash

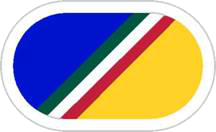
- Background trimming

Fort Polk, formerly Fort Johnson, is a United States Army installation located in Vernon Parish, Louisiana, about 10 miles (15 km) east of Leesville and 30 miles (50 km) north of DeRidder in Beauregard Parish.

The post encompasses about 198,000 acres (309 sq mi). Some 100,000 acres (160 sq mi) are owned by the Department of the Army and 98,125 acres (153.320 sq mi) by the U.S. Forest Service, mostly in the Kisatchie National Forest. In 2013, there were 10,877 troops stationed at Fort Polk, which generated an annual payroll of $980 million. Louisiana officials lobbied the Army and the United States Congress to keep troop strength at full capacity despite looming defense cuts.

Fort Polk began as a base for the Louisiana Maneuvers in the 1940s. It served the 1st Armored Division in the 1950s, and became a basic training post during Vietnam War years of the 1960s and '70s. It hosted the 5th Infantry Division (Mechanized) in the 1970s-1980s, and the 2nd Armored Cavalry Regiment in the 1990s and the 1st Maneuver Enhancement Brigade, and the 162nd Infantry Brigade in the 2000s. Fort Polk is now home to the Joint Readiness Training Center (JRTC), the 3rd Brigade Combat Team, 10th Mountain Division, 115th Combat Support Hospital, U.S. Army Garrison and Bayne-Jones Army Community Hospital.

The land that is now Fort Polk is part of a region of cultural resources, including archaeological sites, historic houses and structures, and other sites of historical value. The U.S. Army has spent considerable time, effort, and money to find and inventory thousands of archaeological sites on Fort Polk and the property owned by the U.S. Forest Service where the Army trains.

Originally named after Confederate general (and Episcopal Bishop) Leonidas Polk, Fort Polk became Fort Johnson during a re-designation ceremony on June 13, 2023, in honor of Sgt. William Henry Johnson, a World War I Medal of Honor recipient from North Carolina who served in the 369th U.S. Infantry Regiment. In June 2025 it was announced that the fort would be renamed back to Fort Polk in honor of Gen. James H. Polk. The redesignation took effect 11 June 2025.

== History ==
=== 1940s ===
==== World War II ====
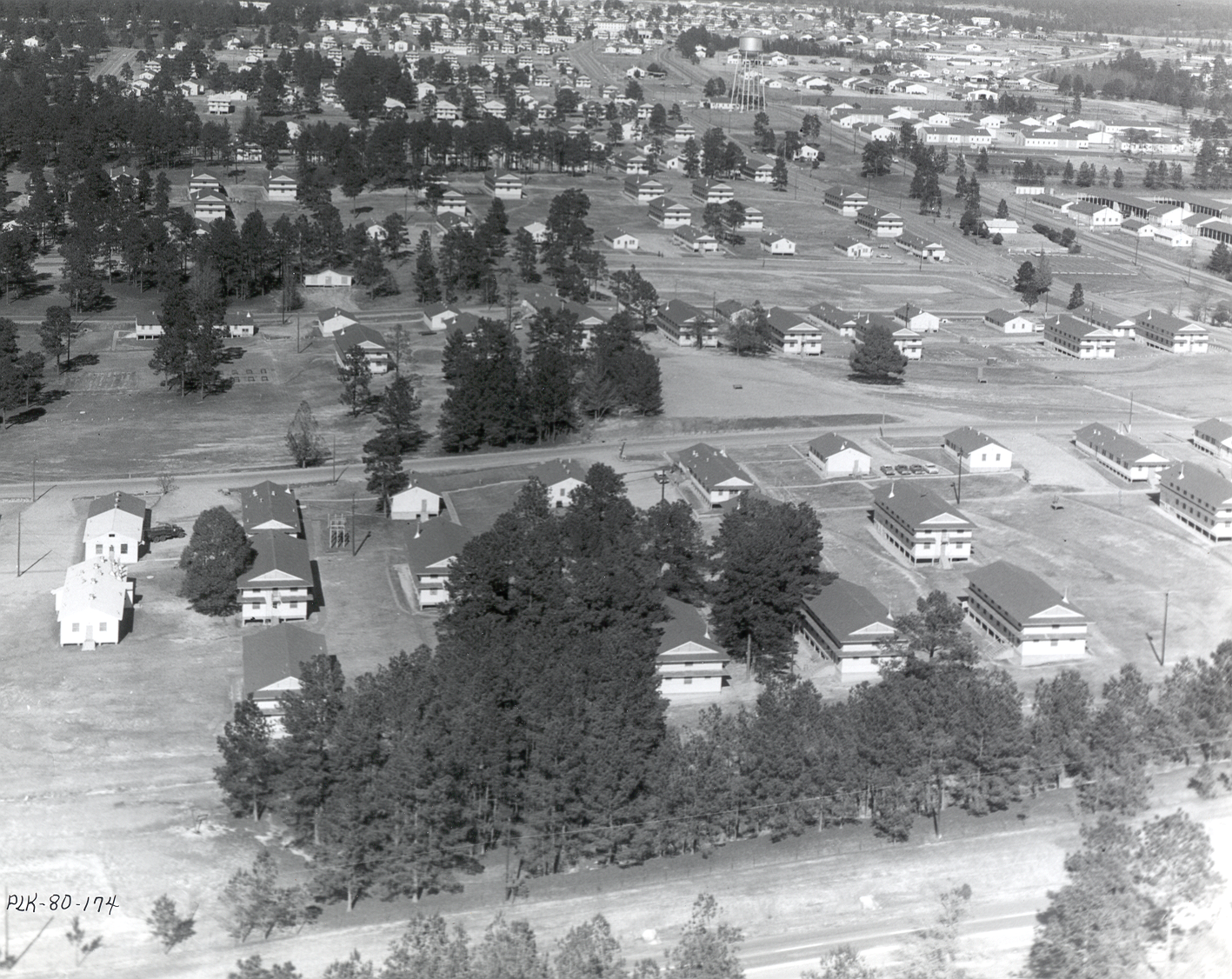
Aerial view of Camp Polk during the 1940s

Construction of Camp Polk began in 1941. Thousands of wooden barracks sprang up quickly to support an Army preparing to do battle on the North African, European and Pacific fronts. Soldiers at Polk participated in the Louisiana Maneuvers, which were designed to test U.S. troops preparing for World War II.

Until 1939, the Army had mostly been an infantry force with supporting artillery, engineer, and cavalry units. Few units had been motorized or mechanized. As U.S. involvement in World War II became more likely, the Army recognized the need to modernize the service. It also needed large-scale maneuvers to test a fast-growing, inexperienced force. That is where Fort Polk and the Louisiana Maneuvers came in.

The maneuvers involved half a million soldiers in 19 Army divisions, and took place over 3,400 square miles (8,800 km^{2}) in August and September 1941. The troops were divided into equal armies of two notional countries: Kotmk (Kansas, Oklahoma, Texas, Missouri, Kentucky) and Almat (Arkansas, Louisiana, Mississippi, Alabama, Tennessee). These countries were fighting over navigation rights in the Mississippi River. The maneuvers gave Army leadership the chance to test a new doctrine that stressed the need for both mass and mobility. Sixteen armored divisions sprang up during World War II after the lessons learned during the Louisiana Maneuvers were considered. These divisions specialized in moving huge combined-arms mechanized units long distances in combat.

On the defensive front, U.S. doctrine was based on two needs: the ability to defeat Blitzkrieg tactics; and how to deal with large numbers of German tanks attacking relatively narrow areas. As such, the maneuvers also tested the concept of the tank destroyer. In this concept, highly mobile guns were held in reserve until friendly forces were attacked by enemy tanks. Then the tank destroyers would be rapidly deployed to the flanks of the penetration. Tank destroyers employed aggressive, high-speed hit-and-run tactics. The conclusion drawn was that tank destroyer battalions should be raised. Immediately after the war, the battalions were disbanded and the anti-tank role was taken over by the Infantry, Engineer, and Armor branches.

==== German POWs ====
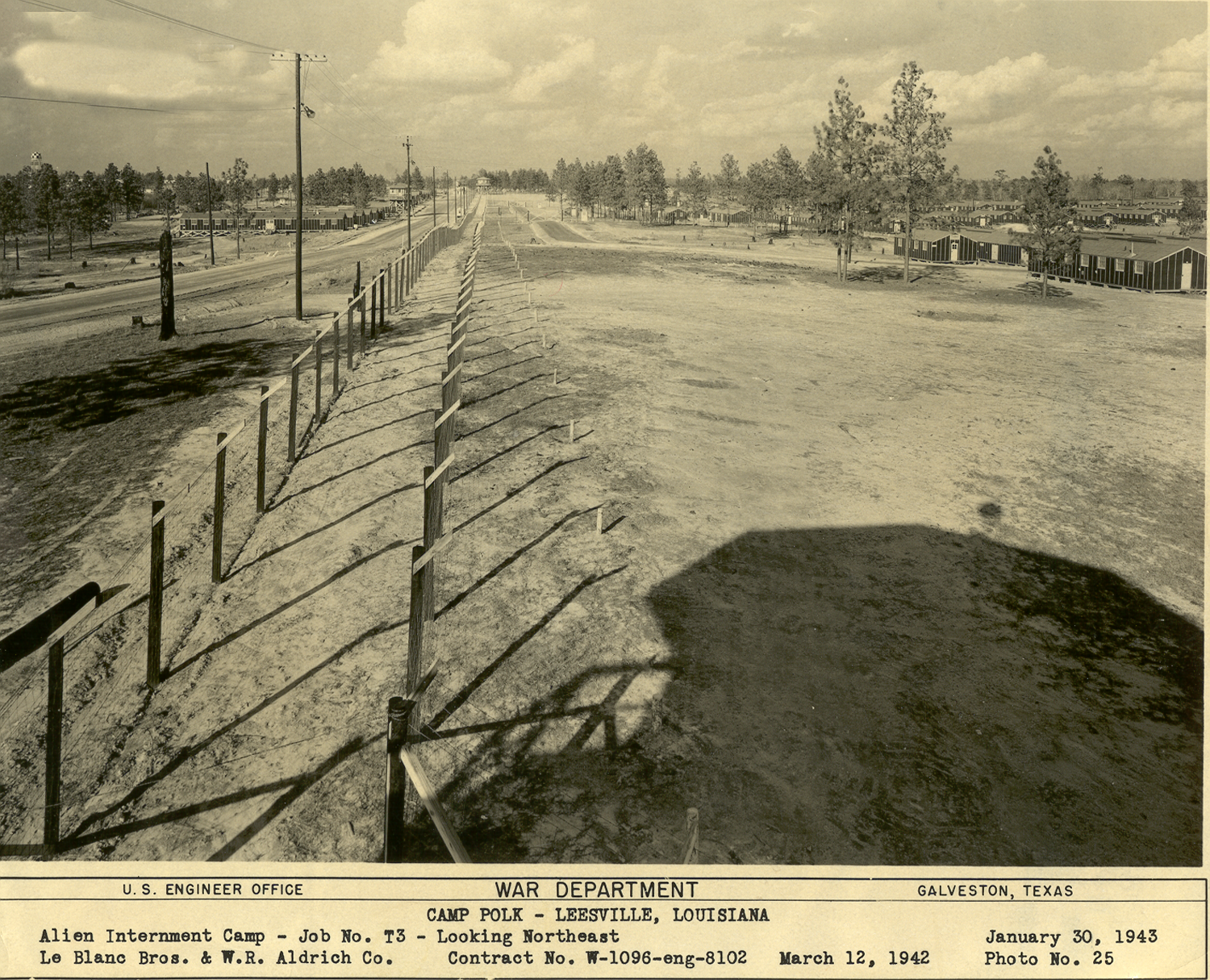
World War II POW Camp at Fort Polk in 1943

While primarily a training facility, Camp Polk also served as a military prison for Germans captured during World War II. The first prisoners of war (POWs), who began arriving in Louisiana in July 1943, were from the Afrika Korps, Field Marshal Erwin Rommel's troops who fought in North Africa. They were housed in a large fenced-in compound in the area now encompassing Honor Field, Fort Polk's parade ground. Finding themselves captured, transported across the ocean, and imprisoned in the middle of summer was made to hurt their spirits. In his book Up Front, author Bill Mauldin noted that it was more practical to ship prisoners to camps in the U.S. on otherwise empty troop ships returning from the ETO, housing and feeding them in the U.S. where escape was far less likely, rather than further burdening outbound cargo ships with provisions for prisoners in camps based in Europe. He added that American GIs resented the fact that German POWs were allowed to breathe the air in the U.S. while GIs were on the battlegrounds of a devastated Europe through the duration of the war, but they understood the logic of keeping the POWs in the U.S. rather than in Europe.

The POWs picked cotton, cut rice, and cut lumber. They also helped sandbag the raging Red River in the summer of 1944. Prisoners were not forced to work, some refused. Those who worked earned scrip for their labor, with which they could buy such necessities as toothpaste or snacks at their own Post Exchange.

From the end of World War II until the early 1960s, the post was closed and reopened numerous times. During much of this time, it was open only in the summers to support reserve component training. Soldiers were stationed there temporarily during the Korean War and the Berlin Crisis.

=== 1950s ===
==== Korea ====
45th Division

In August 1950, the 45th Infantry Division of the Oklahoma Army National Guard became the first unit to train at Fort Polk in preparation for the Korean War. During the Korean War the 45th Infantry Division suffered 4,004 casualties; 834 killed in action and 3,170 wounded in action The division was awarded four campaign streamers and one Presidential Unit Citation.

37th Division

Most of the units who rotated through Camp Polk during 1952-54 were trained for combat by the 37th Infantry Division of the Ohio Army National Guard. Although the 37th Division itself was not sent to Korea as a unit, nearly every soldier was sent as an individual replacement.

==== Operation Sagebrush ====
In 1955, the U.S. military conducted another large training exercise that covered a substantial portion of Louisiana. Named Operation Sagebrush, the focus of this exercise was to evaluate the effectiveness of military operations in a nuclear environment. The exercise lasted for 15 days with 85,000 troops participating. A provisional army, meant to represent U.S. forces, was built around the 1st Armored Division and an opposing force was built around the 82nd Airborne Division. U.S. Air Force bombers and fighter planes also participated in this exercise with powerful aircraft operating in the sky, stirring great interest among the citizens of the region. Also participating as part of the provisional army was the 15th Infantry Regiment (actually designated as 15th Infantry Combat Command) of the 3rd Infantry Division from Fort Benning.

==== 1st Armored Division ====
Upon completion of Operation Sagebrush, Polk was declared a permanent installation and the 1st Armored Division was reassigned from Fort Hood to the newly renamed Fort Polk to continue to test mobility and combat strategies for the nuclear age. The 1st Armored Division, with its modern M-48 Patton Tanks and new helicopters, remained at Fort Polk until June 1959, before returning to Fort Hood.

The Department of the Army decided in 1958 to deactivate Fort Polk. An extensive housing construction project, delivering 2,000 dwelling units for the use of military personnel on site, was underway at the time, under a contract previously let by the Corps of Engineers. The construction contract was terminated by the Corps of Engineers on 5 February 1958. Subsequent disputes with the intended contractor and sub-contractor led to the adoption by the US courts of the Christian Doctrine, which held that standard clauses established by regulations may be considered as being incorporated into every Federal contract.

=== 1960s–1970s ===
==== Vietnam ====
In 1962, Fort Polk began converting to both basic training and an advanced individual training (AIT) center. A small portion of Fort Polk is filled with dense, jungle-like vegetation, so this, along with Louisiana's heat, humidity and precipitation (similar to southeast Asia) helped commanders acclimatize new infantry soldiers in preparation for combat in Vietnam. This training area became known as Tigerland. For the next 12 years, more soldiers were shipped to Vietnam from Fort Polk than from any other American training base. For many, Fort Polk was the only stateside Army post they saw before assignment overseas. Many soldiers reported to basic training at Fort Polk and stayed on post for infantry training at Tigerland before being assigned to infantry line companies in Vietnam.

In October 1974, Fort Polk became the new home of the 5th Infantry Division (Mechanized), and basic training and AIT started being phased out. Fort Polk changed from a Continental Army Command (CONARC) post in July 1975 and became a Forces Command (FORSCOM) member. In the spring of 1976, the Infantry Training Center at Fort Polk closed its doors and ceased operations. The final chapter of the Vietnam War ended for Fort Polk. The Combat Engineer Battalion of the 588th lived on North Fort Polk, Louisiana.

=== 1970s–1980s ===
5th Division

With the end of the Vietnam War, Fort Polk experienced a transition from an installation focused on basic and advanced individual training to that of the home of the reactivated 5th Infantry Division (Mechanized). Activated in September 1975, the division called Fort Polk home until it was inactivated in November 1992. The date of this inactivation, 24 November 1992, was exactly 75 years from the date of the original activation of the division on 24 November 1917. The division was organized with two active duty brigades and a brigade from the Louisiana National Guard. From 1972 until 1987, Fort Polk hosted the 1st Battalion, 40th Armor Regiment. During that time 1/40th Armor participated in training exercises with the Louisiana Army National Guard and 5th Infantry Division units. It was part of the Rapid Deployment Force for the operations in Grenada, but was not deployed, instead it was reassigned to the hills nol (German Defense Plan). In 1983, the 1/40 Armor took part in the Reforger 1984 exercises in Bavaria and two deployments to the National Training Center in 1984 and 1985. The 1/40 Armor was deactivated at Fort Polk in 1987. It was reactivated as the 1st Squadron, 40th Cavalry at Fort Richardson in Alaska in 2005. While at Fort Polk, the 5th Infantry Division participated in the NATO Reforger 78 and 84 Exercise in Europe and the 1989 Invasion of Panama, known as Operation Just Cause. From June to August 1987 the 95th Division (Tng) conducted basic training exercises of approximately 600 recruits. During the stay of the 5th Infantry Division (Mechanized), Fort Polk experienced a major building program that included new barracks, motor pools, 1000 family housing units, chapels, and dental clinics. The Bayne-Jones Army Community Hospital, named after Stanhope Bayne-Jones, a modern Post Exchange, commissary, warehouses, classrooms, athletic complexes and improved gunnery ranges.

Effective 21 March 1976, the 1st Battalion 61st Infantry was reactivated and once again assigned to the 5th Division at Fort Polk.

=== 1990s ===
==== JRTC moves to Polk ====
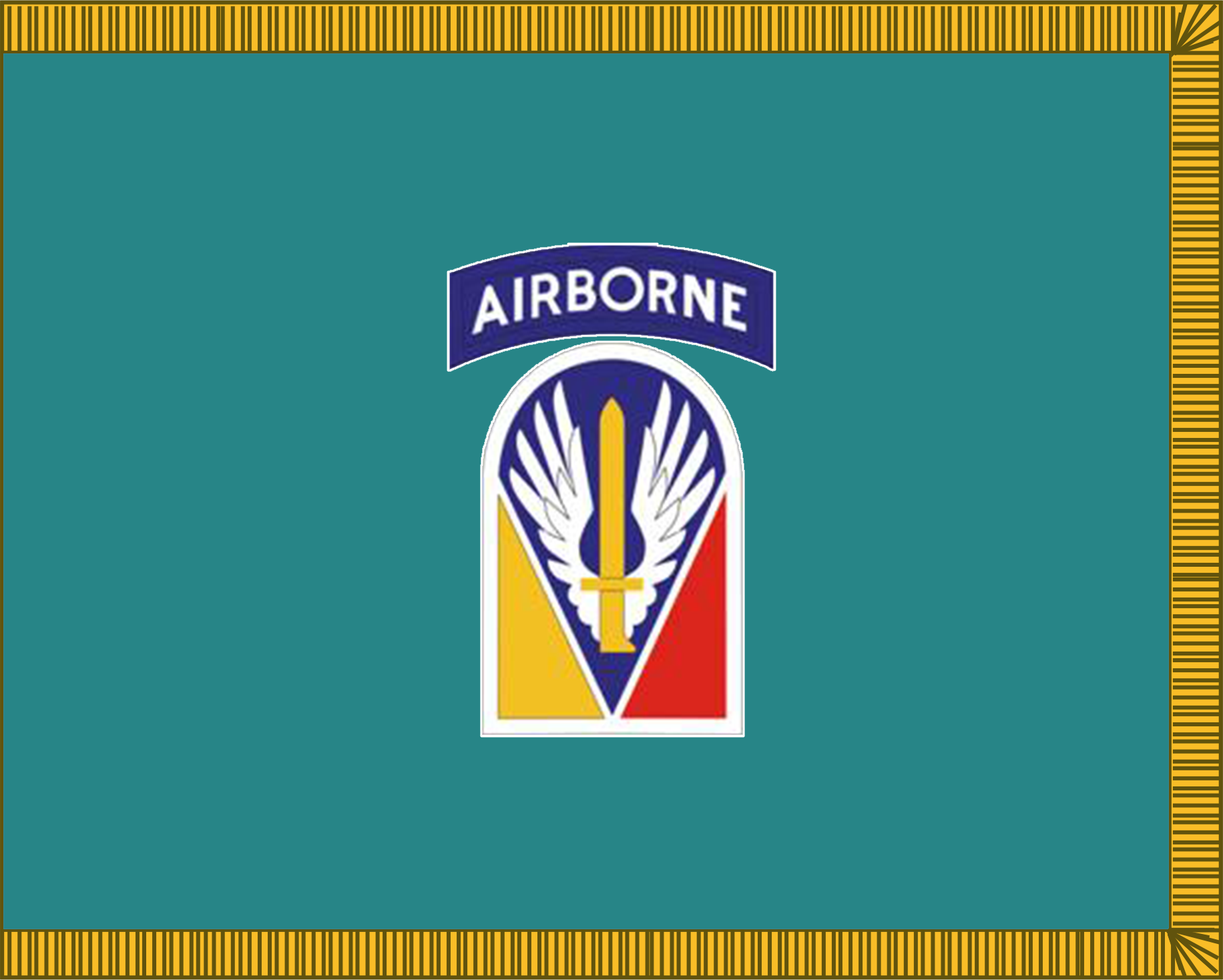
Joint Readiness Training Center Flag

In 1993, the Joint Readiness Training Center moved from Fort Chaffee, Arkansas, to Fort Polk, and once again, the post was called on to prepare soldiers for conflict. Each year, JRTC typically conducts several rotations for units about to deploy. During the 1990s, Fort Polk based soldiers deployed to Haiti, Southwest Asia, Suriname, Panama, Bosnia, and other locations. Weather support for the exercise is completed by the units participating in the exercise in conjunction with the 26th Operational Weather Squadron.

==== 2nd Armored Cavalry Regiment ====
2nd Armored Cavalry Regiment

The 2nd Armored Cavalry Regiment arrived at Fort Polk in 1993 as the armored cavalry regiment of the XVIII Airborne Corps. Elements of the regiment deployed to Haiti in 1995 in support of Operation Uphold Democracy and to Bosnia in 1996 in support of Operation Joint Endeavor. The 2nd ACR deployed to Kuwait, Qatar, Jordan and Djibouti in 2002 to in support of Operation Enduring Freedom, and then deployed in Iraq in 2003 in support of Operation Iraqi Freedom (now known as Operation New Dawn). The Army announced on 14 May 2004, that the 2nd Armored Cavalry Regiment would be transformed into an Infantry-based Stryker Brigade and move to Fort Lewis, Washington. The transfer of the 2nd Armored Cavalry Regiment from Fort Polk to Fort Lewis was completed in 2006. The 2nd Stryker Cavalry Regiment was later moved to Vilseck, Germany.

=== 2000s ===
During the War on terror and the invasion of Iraq, the JRTC trained soldiers on counterinsurgency operations, including building relations with local leaders, leading infrastructure projects, and establishing forward operating bases.

== Current units ==
=== Operations Group ===
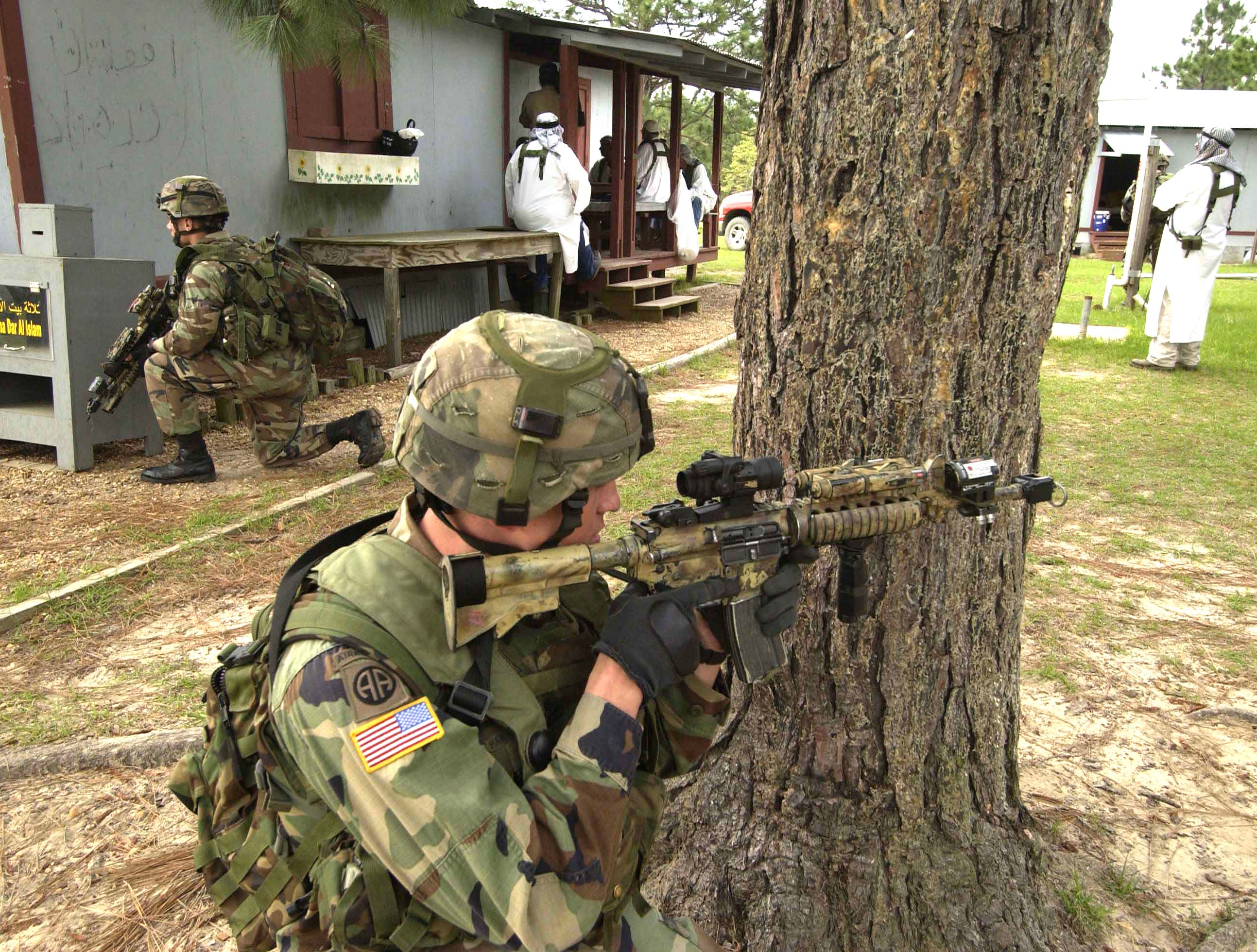
Soldiers from the 82nd Airborne Division participate in an exercise in a simulated Iraqi village at the Joint Readiness Training Center.

The Joint Readiness Training Center is focused on improving unit readiness by providing highly realistic, stressful, joint and combined arms training across the full spectrum of conflict. The JRTC is one of the Army's three "Dirt" Combat Training Centers resourced to train infantry brigade task forces and their subordinate elements in the Joint Contemporary Operational Environment.

With great emphasis on realism, the JRTC Operations Group provides rotational units with the opportunity to conduct joint operations which emphasize contingency force missions. The JRTC training scenario is based on each participating organization's mission essential tasks list and many of exercises are mission rehearsals for actual operations the organization is scheduled to conduct.

JRTC scenarios allow complete integration of Air Force and other military services as well as host-nation and civilian role players. The exercise scenarios replicate many of the unique situations and challenges a unit may face to include host national officials and citizens, insurgents and terrorists, news media coverage and non-governmental organizations.

=== 1st Battalion, 509th Infantry Regiment ===
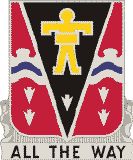

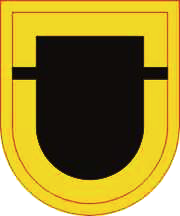

The mission of the Opposing Force is handled by the 1st Battalion, 509th Infantry Regiment (1-509th IR). It is the job of the 1-509th IR to conduct combat operations as a dedicated, capabilities-based Opposing Force (OPFOR) to provide realistic, stressful, and challenging combat conditions for JRTC rotational units.

=== 3rd Brigade Combat Team, 10th Mountain Division ===

The 3rd Brigade Combat Team, 36th Infantry Division was officially activated at Fort Polk in February 2014 as 3rd Brigade Combat Team, 10th Mountain Division, utilizing the assets of the 4th Brigade Combat Team, 10th Mountain Division, which was inactivated. As part of the Army's transformation initiative, this organization was designed to create a highly mobile, lethal, and flexible combat unit to support the rapid buildup of combat power wherever needed across the globe. The structure of the brigade is modular and provides for organic infantry, cavalry, field artillery, maintenance, logistic and support capabilities. While stilled flagged as 4th Brigade, it deployed in support of Operation Enduring Freedom from 2006 to 2007 then again for Operation Iraqi Freedom from December 2007 to January 2009. The brigade deployed to Afghanistan in fall 2010 and returned to the U.S. in fall 2011. From 2016 to 2019, the "Patriot Brigade", as they are known, became part of the 36th Infantry Division (Army National Guard) as part of the Army's Associated Unit Pilot. The "Patriot Brigade" was the only Regular Army unit assigned to the 36th ID but returned to the 10th Mountain Division when the Army's Associated Unit Pilot ended.

=== 115th Combat Support Hospital ===
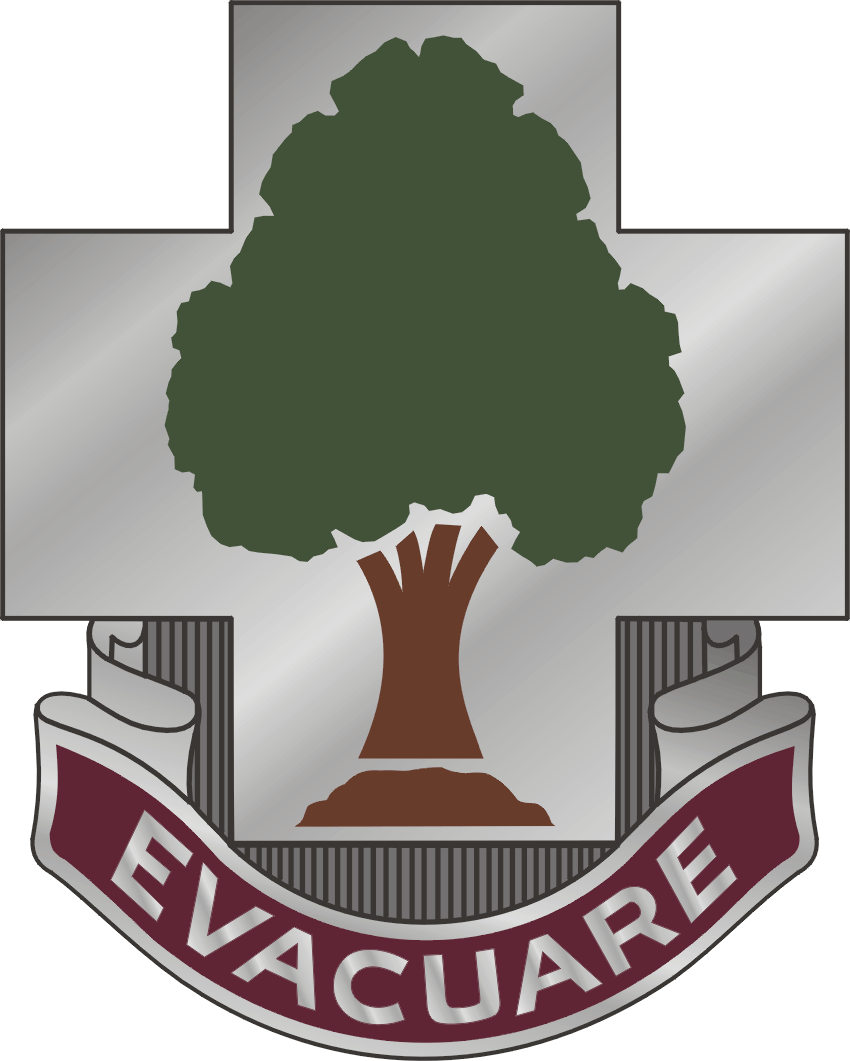

The 115th Combat Support Hospital traces its origin to Evacuation Hospital #15, originally organized at Fort Riley, Kansas on 21 March 1918. At the onset of hostilities during World War I, the unit sailed aboard the "S.S. Mataika", departing the United States on 22 August 1918, and arriving in France 3 September 1918. Evacuation Hospital #15 earned a battle streamer for its participation in the Meuse-Argonne Forest offensive from 26 September 1918 through 11 November 1918. The hospital, having served honorably and proud during World War I, returned to the United States aboard the "S.S. America" and was demobilized at Camp Lewis, Washington on 28 June 1919. Evacuation Hospital #15 was reconstituted as the 15th Evacuation Hospital in 1936, after having been organized as an inactive unit of the Regular Army on 1 October 1933.

115th Combat Support Hospital is a deployable medical unit that provides medical specialities to the battlefield. Medical specialties provided by the 115th Combat Support Hospital include: general surgery, orthopaedics, podiatry, and physical therapy. Additional support for clinical operations is provided through a pharmacy, X-ray services, clinical laboratories, anaesthesia, and operative services. The 115th Combat Support Hospital is also staffed to provide medical command management and administrative support through an organic medical headquarters.

During peacetime operations the 115th Field Hospital trains at the JRTC and Fort Polk. As a deployable medical systems hospital with the most modern equipment available, the unit is capable of being deployed in an area of operations during a contingency, war or national emergency.

=== U.S. Army Garrison ===
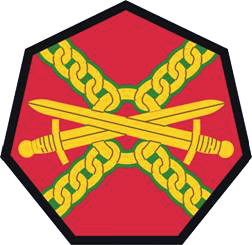

U.S. Army Garrison provides installation support for all tenant units as well as JRTC rotational units.

=== Bayne-Jones Army Community Hospital ===
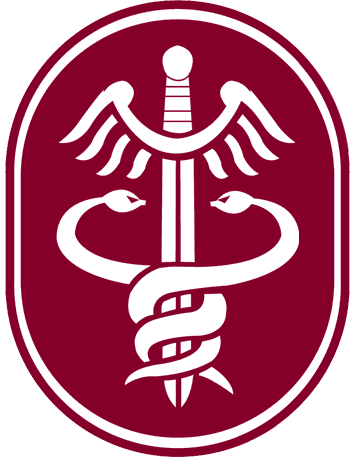

The Fort Polk medical facility comprises the Bayne-Jones Army Community Hospital, the Wellness and Readiness Center, the Department of Behavioral Health and the United States Army Air Ambulance Detachment. The hospital is named in honour of Brigadier General Stanhope Bayne-Jones, a native of New Orleans, Louisiana. A bacteriologist and preventive medicine specialist, he achieved worldwide acclaim as the individual responsible for the control of typhus in Europe at the conclusion of World War II.

== National Guard ==
The Louisiana Army National Guard maintains a maintenance facility on Fort Polk which services its major units such as the 256th Infantry Brigade Combat Team and 225th Engineer Brigade.

== Current ==
=== Land expansion ===
There have been several times when Fort Polk was at risk of closing. In 2002 the Army stated a position of "No acquisition of land through purchase or withdrawal of public domain lands is proposed", but in 2005 there were concerns of the post being "at risk", with a proposal to look at land expansion.

In 2008 Fort Polk began a land expansion plan. The plan calls for the acquisition of 100,000 acres for large JRTC maneuvers and live fire operations. This will be the largest land expansion since World War II, located south and southeast of Peason Ridge, and the first parcel was purchased in 2012. Eminent domain is an option if needed. Fort Polk issued a press release on 5 May 2014, that 32,500 acres of the targeted 47,500, out of the 100,000 approved, has been acquired. Fifty-four landowners are involved, twenty-nine residences, with the U.S. Army Corps of Engineers being the Army's real estate agent.

=== Building updates ===
On 12 November 2014, a grand opening for a new Fort Polk Commissary took place.

=== Renaming ===
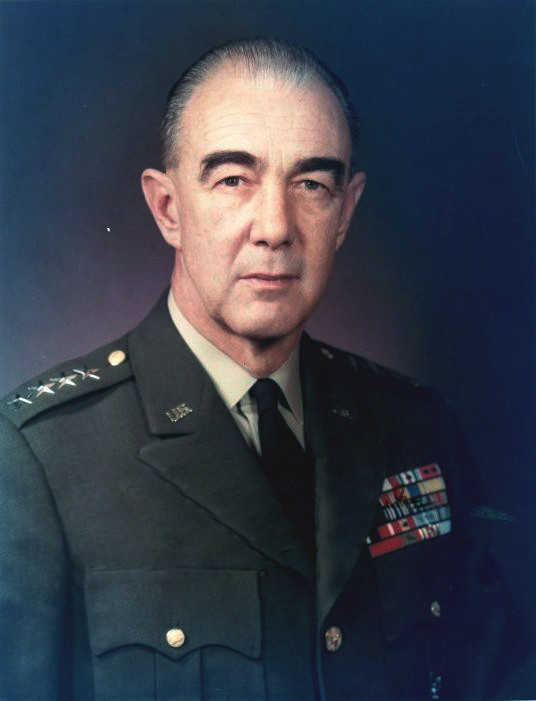
General James H. Polk

On 13 June 2023, the fort was renamed to honor Sergeant William Henry Johnson (1892–1929), a World War I veteran from the New York National Guard unit known as the "Harlem Hellfighters". It was previously named for Leonidas Polk, a Confederate general. Johnson was one of the first Americans to receive the French "Croix de Guerre". He was posthumously awarded the Purple Heart, the Distinguished Service Cross, and the Medal of Honor. It was one of the U.S. Army installations named for Confederate soldiers recommended for renaming by the Congressional Naming Commission. On January 5, 2023, William A. LaPlante, the US under-secretary of defense for acquisition and sustainment (USD (A&S)), directed the full implementation of the recommendations of the Naming Commission, DoD-wide.

On 10 June 2025, it was announced that the base name would be reverted to Fort Polk and renamed in honor of four star Gen. James H. Polk (1911–1992), who, over his career from 1933 to 1971, earned the Army Distinguished Service Medal, Silver Star, and Bronze Star from the United States, and the Croix de Guerre and Legion of Honor from France, as well as several honors bestowed after his retirement, such as the German Badge of Honour of the Bundeswehr.

== Wildlife management ==
An area covering 105,545 acres (42,713 ha) within the post has been designated Fort Polk-Vernon Wildlife Management Area. An estimated 700 to 750 feral horses roam training lands on and around Fort Polk. The fate of the horses has been the subject of debate since the Army started removing them in 2017.

== Education ==
Military families associated with Fort Polk, including those on and off post, may choose Vernon Parish School Board or Beauregard Parish School Board for education of dependents for grades 5–12. Beauregard and Vernon parishes do not have any Department of Defense Education Activity (DoDEA) schools.
