= Prior information =

Prior information may refer to

- Prior probability
- A prior information notice (PIN) issued in advance of procurement actions for the purposes of government procurement in the European Union
