= Changes clause =

A changes clause, in government contracting, is a required clause in United States government construction contracts.

== Background ==
Cardinal Changes (Significant Changes) clauses are the source of a significant number of disputes arising from government contracts. The clause, which has appeared in nearly every U.S. government contract for over 100 years, gives the government the power unilaterally to order contractual modifications. If the parties are unable to agree on compensation to be received by the contractor for the modified work, the contractor shall be entitled to an equitable adjustment. 'The goal of an equitable adjustment is to place the contractor in the position they would have been in had the change not been encountered'. The adjustment should not alter the contractor's profit or loss position from what it was before the change occurred.

The Changes clause was first used in defense contracts where it was taken to be essential in time of war for the government to include new technologies without halting work to renegotiate the contract. Changes clauses are in almost all categories of government contracts. If the Changes Clause is not incorporated in writing it is incorporated implicitly under the Christian Doctrine in almost all U.S. government contracts, including FAR Part 12 contracts.

== Changes clauses for construction contracts in the Federal Acquisition Regulations ==
There are three Changes clauses for construction contracts contained in the Federal Acquisition Regulations. One applies to fixed-price contracts, another to cost reimbursement contracts, and the third to time and materials or labor hours.

All three of these clauses give the government the right, at any time and without notice to the sureties, to make changes in the work within the general scope of the contract. The clause for fixed-price contracts specifies that changes may be made to the specifications (including drawings and designs), the method or manner of performance, government-furnished facilities, equipment, materials, services, or site, or acceleration of the work. The clause for cost reimbursement contracts specifies that changes may be made to the "plans and specifications or instructions incorporated in the contract."

== Purposes ==
The Changes clause accommodate several purposes. Either party may want to incorporate a technological advance. The Changes clause allows the contractor to propose changes to the work. This can result in more efficient contract performance. The Changes clause permits the government to ask for something new without the overhead of conducting a new procurement.

The limitation of the government's right to make changes to those changes deemed to be "within the general scope of the contract" was for many years of great procedural significance in government contract litigation because, prior to the Contract Disputes Act of 1978, a claim arising from such a change could not be brought to the various boards of contract appeals. This was because claims involving changes outside the general scope of the contract, sometimes called cardinal changes, were deemed to be breach of contract cases and had to be taken to the Court of Claims. The distinction between cardinal and other changes is no longer jurisdictionally significant because the Contract Disputes Act gives boards of contract appeals concurrent jurisdiction with the U.S. Court of Federal Claims (formerly named the U.S. Claims Court) over breach of contract cases. Whether a change is a cardinal change may, however, still be relevant to whether the contractor can unilaterally stop work pending resolution of a dispute, and the measure of damages that may be recovered.

As a quid pro quo for the government's unilateral right to order changes, the Changes clause gives the contractor a right to compensation. If the parties are able to agree on the amount of the cost adjustment, they can execute a contract modification. If they are unable to agree, the contractor is entitled to an equitable adjustment in accordance with the cost principles contained in Part 31 of the FAR.

== Cost reimbursement vs. fixed cost contracts ==
The nature of the Changes clause for cost reimbursement contracts is somewhat different from that for fixed-price contracts because in the case of a cost reimbursement contract the contractor is already entitled to reimbursement for all of its reasonable costs and only needs an adjustment in the target price or the amount of its fee. The clause provides for such an adjustment to be made in the estimated cost, delivery or completion schedule, and the amount of any fixed fee.

There are a number of basic rules regarding the Changes clause that have been developed by the courts and boards of contract appeals over the years. One of the fundamental tenets is that a contractor cannot claim an equitable adjustment where it incurs additional costs or performance delays voluntarily, rather than as a result of government action. Another tenet is that a contractor cannot prevail on its claim for equitable adjustment unless it shows that its interpretation of the contract is reasonable. Moreover, the government is responsible only for changes ordered, approved, or adopted by the contracting officer or an authorized representative of the contracting officer.

== Causation ==
To recover for a change, the contractor must show that the change caused the increased costs or delays for which it is seeking compensation. A contractor ordinarily will not be entitled to recover for a constructive change in the work required by the government where the government's actions were not the direct cause of the contractor's increased costs. An example of such a situation is where government-furnished property is not at the work site on schedule, but does not cause any delay to the contractor because, for other reasons, the contractor was not ready to proceed with the installation of that property. Where, however, a contractor and the government are both responsible, through their unreasonable acts, for failure to discover a differing site condition, the costs of the delay have been ordered shared.
