= School of thought =

Group sharing common opinion

A school of thought, or intellectual tradition, is the perspective of a group of people who share common characteristics of opinion or outlook of a philosophy, discipline, belief, social movement, economics, cultural movement, or art movement. The phrase has become a common colloquialism to describe those that think alike or those that focus on a common idea.

Schools are often named after their founders such as the "Rinzai school" of Zen, named after Linji Yixuan; and the Asharite school of early Muslim philosophy, named after Abu l'Hasan al-Ashari. They are often also named after their places of origin, such as the Ionian school of philosophy, which originated in Ionia; the Chicago school of architecture, which originated in Chicago, Illinois; the Prague school of linguistics, named after a linguistic circle founded in Prague; and the Tartu–Moscow Semiotic School, whose representatives lived in Tartu and Moscow.

An example of a school of thought in Christianity is Neoplatonism, which has massively influenced Christian thought, from Augustinianism to Renaissance/Humanism to the present day.

== See also ==
- Commentary of a philosophical text
- List of philosophies
- Mindset
- Paradigm
- Philosophical movement
- Scientific school
- Worldview
