= ESPD (disambiguation) =

ESPD is the European Single Procurement Document

ESPD may also refer to:

- End stage pulmonary disease
- European Solar Physics Division, division of the European Physical Society
