= INTERREG IV France-Wallonie-Vlaanderen =

The INTERREG IV France-Wallonie-Vlaanderen Programme 2007–2013, which is co-financed by the European Union, aims at intensifying the cooperation in a cross-border area of 62,000 km^{2} with around 10.5 million inhabitants: the provinces Hainaut, Namur, Luxembourg, Western Flanders and Eastern Flanders in Belgium and the departments Nord-Pas-de-Calais, Aisne and Ardennes in France.

== Means used ==
The total budget of the INTERREG IV France-Wallonie-Vlaanderen Programme amounts to 276 million Euros, 50% of which financed by the European Union through the European Regional Development Fund. The balance is taken care of by the operators and the regional or territorial institutions concerned. On 30 June 2010, 83% of the European funds were already invested. The Steering Committees indeed approved over 140 projects, which are co-financed by the European Regional Development Fund up to 114 million Euros.

== Set of themes ==
The INTERREG IV France-Wallonie-Vlaanderen Programme is structured around 4 main axes:

- furthering economic development of the area by means of a coherent and integrated cross-border approach;
- developing and promoting the identity of the cross-border territory through culture and tourism;
- strengthening the feeling of belonging to a common space through the improvement of the offer and by making access to cross-border services easier;
- dynamising the joint management of the territory through the sustainable, coordinated and integrated development of the living environment.

== Institutional partners ==
Wallonia is the Administrating authority of the programme. It coordinates the realization of the cross-border actions with:

- the Prefectures of the Regions of Nord-Pas de Calais, Picardy, and Champagne-Ardenne
- the Regions of Nord-Pas de Calais, Picardy, and Champagne-Ardenne
- the Departments of Nord, Pas-de-Calais, Aisne, and Ardennes
- the French Community of Belgium
- the Flemish Region
- the Provinces of Western and Eastern Flanders.

== Results of the programme ==
A selection of the outcome:

- 600 jobs created or maintained;
- 208 cross-border training sessions;
- 115 cooperation actions between competency centers;
- 62 international promotion actions of the cross-border area;
- over 1,200 joint cultural events;
- 322 integrated actions aiming at reducing energy consumption;
- about a hundred actions aiming at furthering bilingualism;
- ...
