= Center of excellence =

Broad term describing a shared facility or entity

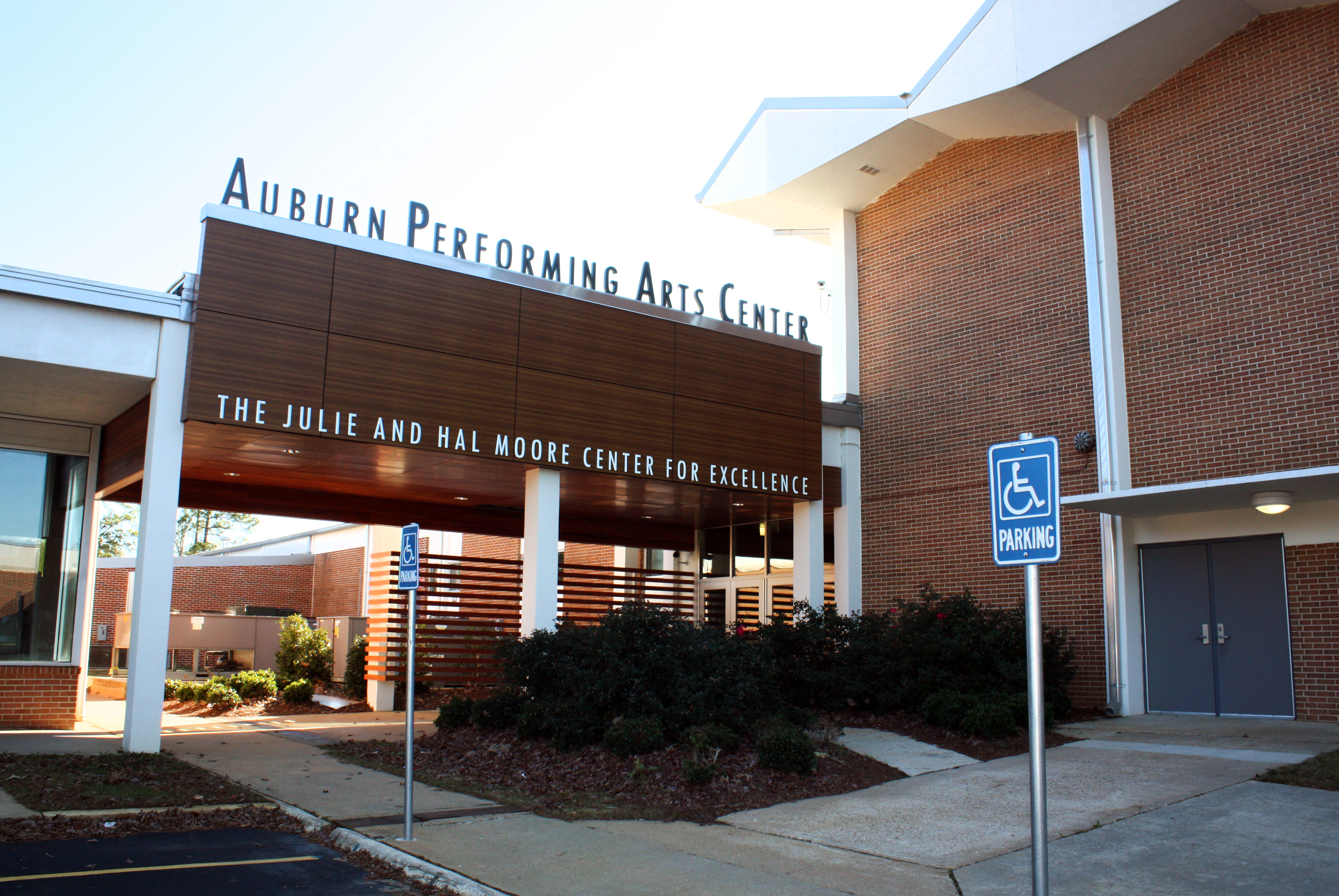
The Auburn Performing Arts Center, Julie and Hal Moore Center for Excellence at Auburn High School (Alabama) is focused on performing arts.

A center of excellence (COE or CoE), also called an excellence center, is a team, a shared facility or an entity that provides leadership, best practices, research, support, or training for a focus area.

Due to its broad usage and vague legal precedent, a "center of excellence", in one context, may have completely different characteristics from another. The focus area might be a technology (such as the Java software platform), a business concept (such as business process management), a skill (such as negotiation) or a broad area of study (such as women's health). A center of excellence may also be formed to revitalize stalled initiatives. The term may also refer to a network of institutions collaborating with each other to pursue excellence in a particular area. (e.g. the Rochester Area Colleges Center for Excellence in Math and Science).

== Organizations ==
Within an organization, a center of excellence may refer to a group of people, a department or a shared facility. It may also be known as a competency center, or as a capability center, or as an excellence center. Stephen Jenner and Craig Kilford, in Management of Portfolios, mention COE as a coordinating function which ensures that change initiatives are delivered consistently and well, through standard processes and competent staff. In technology companies, the center of excellence concept is often associated with new software tools, technologies or associated business concepts such as service-oriented architecture or business intelligence.

== Academia ==
In academic institutions, a center of excellence often refers to a team with a clear focus on a particular area of research; such a center may bring together faculty members from different disciplines and provide shared facilities.

=== South America and Asia ===
The governments of Guyana and India jointly formed the Centre for Excellence in Information Technology (CEIT) at the University of Guyana in 2019.

=== Australia ===
In Australia, the Australian Research Council (ARC) funds a competitive grant program for centres of excellence which link a number of institutions within the country and internationally in a specific field of research. New centres are funded every three years and each run for seven years.

=== Philippines ===
In the Philippines, a center of excellence (COE) is a certification given by the Commission on Higher Education to departments within a higher education institution (e.g. a college within a university) which "continuously demonstrates excellent performance in the areas of instruction, research and publication, extension and linkages and institutional qualifications". Candidates for this certification are referred as centers of development (CODs) by the education body.

=== Russia ===
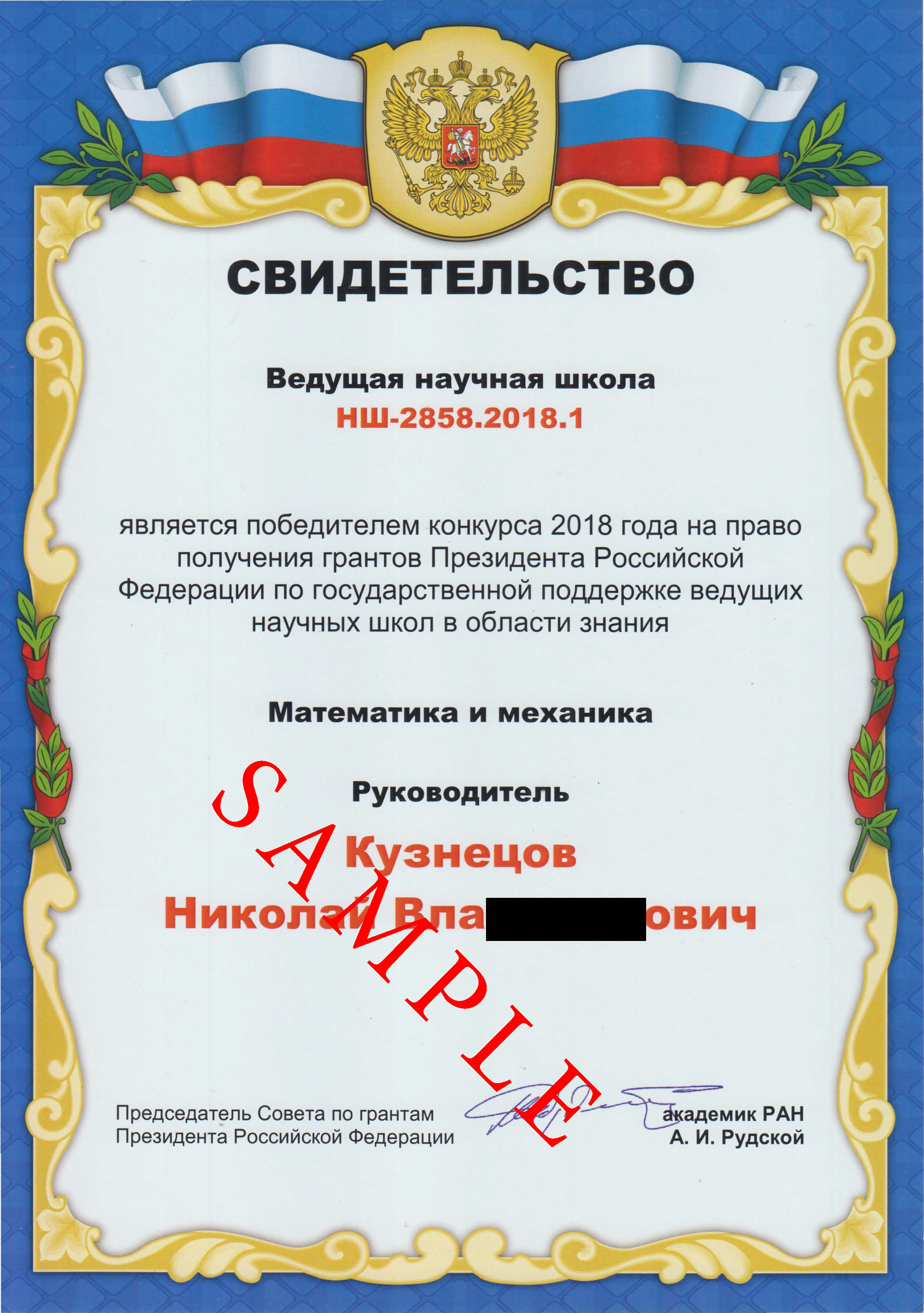
Sample certificate of the Leading Scientific School of the Russian Federation (leader N. Kuznetsov) from 2018

In Russia, the Center of Excellence status (in Russian it is used notion Scientific School) is granted by the Council for Grants of the President of the Russian Federation since 1996. To obtain the COE status, a group of scientists, usually based on a department at a university or a laboratory at an academic institute, and its leader should have a high scientific reputation and should submit an application, which presents a plan of scientific and educational work for the period of two years, to the council. The council issues a special certificate of the COE status to the leader of the group.

=== United Kingdom ===
In the United Kingdom, schools and sixth forms specialising in an area of curriculum are known as specialist schools. These schools are recognised as centres of excellence in their specialist subject areas. Schools that attained Beacon status were also recognised as centres of excellence, however this status has been discontinued.

== Business and technology ==
Walmart is designating certain employee healthcare venues as centers of excellence. In 2013, several regions of the country (Dallas-Fort Worth; Northern Arkansas; Orlando, FL) Walmart is offering employees free treatment when they use the designated CoEs. Treatments are administered to covered employees, who travel to the centers, along with a caregiver, for a course of treatment at the center. Depending on the budgetary outcome, Walmart will be sharing its operational results with other employers, as a method of controlling its healthcare costs.

Ford Motor Company opened its Ford Ion Park battery center of excellence, meant to centralize a cross-functional team to accelerate the development of battery and battery cell technology. Electrical batteries would then serve as the basis for all-electric vehicles.

Northrop Grumman has invested in a manned aircraft design center of excellence in Melbourne, Florida. It uses modeling and simulation tools at the center of excellence which predict the performance of its test-bed aircraft, as a method for reducing risk during the process of developing the B-21. In 2013, it designated five centres for excellence in the U.S.

Huntington Ingalls Industries is building out an Unmanned Systems center of excellence, which is working on Boeing's project for the Navy's Extra Large Unmanned Undersea Vehicle.

Asda's merchandising centre of excellence in Leeds contains "a full-size model store for mocking up different shelf layouts and a state-of-the-art virtual reality lab, where Asda and its suppliers can test store layouts and construction plans".

Unum opened its IT centre of excellence in Carlow, Ireland in 2008, expanding it in 2020 promoting business technology in the U.S. and abroad

IBM Consulting launched its center of excellence for transformative generative AI in 2023.

Alliant Techsystems, Otis Elevator, Alcoa, Greatbatch, and GE have each used centers of excellence as organizational mechanisms to gain economies of scale, when discovering and sharing efficiencies of operation.

== Healthcare ==
In the healthcare sector, the term often refers to a center that provides sufficient and easily accessible medical services to patients.

The National Institutes of Health (NIH) of the United States, in 2023, allocated $24 million to create 10 maternal health research centers of excellence.

In the British NHS, the term is almost always used sarcastically, following its popularisation by Dr Peter Gooderham on the Doctors.net.uk fora. It can often be heard being used to describe tertiary centres by staff working in district general hospitals.

== Defence ==
=== Europe ===
In the European defense community, the European Centre of Excellence for Countering Hybrid Threats is a response to hybrid warfare on its periphery; the COE seeks to inform, and also protect its non-NATO components, as well as its non-PESCO members. The US Department of Defense (DoD) intends to use CoEs that focus on key technologies, such as drones, and commercial satellite imagery.

=== United States Army ===
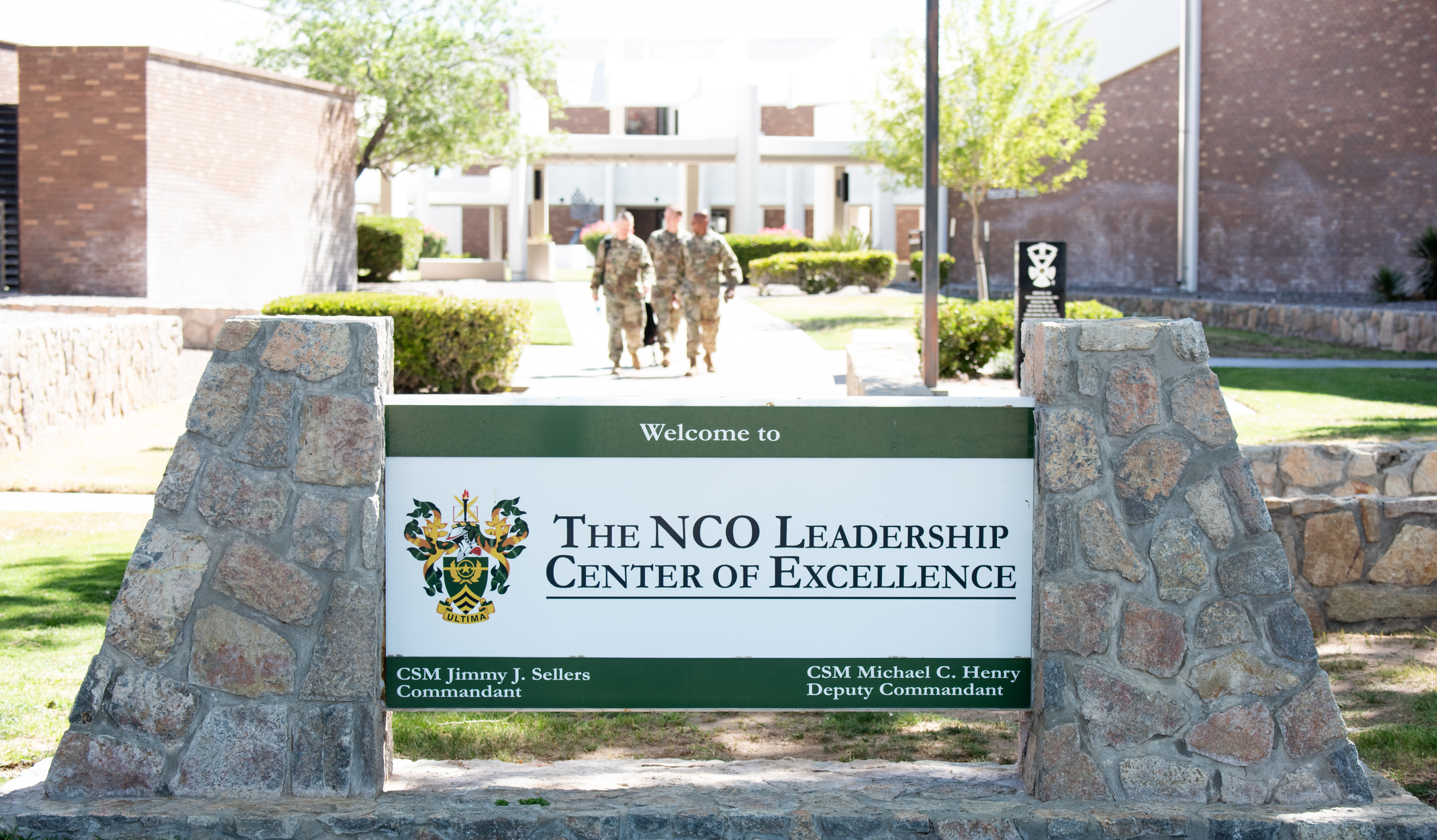
US Army NCO Leadership Center of Excellence in Fort Bliss, Texas

The Army maintains numerous Centers of Excellence (CoE) at major universities, training installations, and other locations:

1. Acquisition COE - Huntsville, Alabama
2. Aviation COE - Fort Novosel, Alabama
3. Cyber COE - Fort Gordon, Georgia
4. Fires COE - Fort Sill, Oklahoma
5. Human Resource COE - Fort Knox, Kentucky
6. Initial Military Training COE - Fort Eustis, Virginia
7. Intelligence COE - Fort Huachuca, Arizona
8. Maneuver COE - Fort Benning, Georgia
9. Maneuver Support COE Fort Leonard Wood, Missouri
10. Medical COE - Joint Base San Antonio (JBSA), Texas
11. Mission Command COE - Fort Leavenworth, Kansas
12. NCO Leadership COE - Fort Bliss, Texas
13. Space and Missile Defense CoE - Peterson Space Force Base, Colorado
14. Special Operations COE - Fort Bragg, North Carolina
15. Sustainment COE - Fort Gregg-Adams, Virginia

TRADOC oversees ten of these Centers of Excellence, each focused on a separate area of expertise within the Army. These centers train over 500,000 Soldiers and service members each year.

== See also ==
- Homeland Security Centers of Excellence
- Center for Excellence in Disaster Management and Humanitarian Assistance, U.S. Pacific Command
- Rochester Area Colleges Center for Excellence in Math and Science
- Center of Excellence for Stability Police Units
- European Centre of Excellence for Countering Hybrid Threats
- Cross-functional team (CFT)
