= Termination for convenience =

Enables ending of a contract due to changed needs

A termination for convenience clause, or "T for C" clause, enables a party to a contract to bring the contract to an end without the need to establish that the other party is in default, for example because the client party's needs have changed, or in order to arrange for another party to complete the contract.

Parties may agree to include a termination for convenience clause in a contract under the freedom of contract principle. However, in some countries and legal jurisdictions there may be statute law or case law which affects the operation or interpretation of such a clause.

== Use in the United States ==
In the United States, Part 49 of the Federal Acquisition Regulation (FAR) establishes policies and procedures relating to the complete or partial termination of contracts for the convenience of the Government, alongside making provision for termination due to the default of the contractor. When it is in the government's interest, the FAR provides for contracts to be terminated. In circumstances where there is no contractor default, the grounds for termination will be for "the convenience of the government". Part 49.104 includes an opportunity for a terminated contractor to submit a termination settlement proposal, which is to be submitted "promptly".

Termination policies for contracts for the acquisition of commercial items are covered separately in FAR 12.403, and the FAR notes that the concepts involved in such termination are different from the Part 49 concepts.

Normally, where the price of the undelivered balance of the contract is less than $5,000, the contract would not be terminated for convenience but would be permitted to run to completion.

In the case of G. L. Christian and Associates v. United States (1963), which gave rise to the Christian Doctrine, the US Department of the Army sought to rely on the standard termination for convenience clause outlined in the Armed Services Procurement Regulations (ASPR) even though the Army had failed to include this termination for convenience clause in the contract.

== Other examples ==
In Canada, the Supreme Court of Canada has recognised that good faith contractual performance is a general organising principle of the common law. This duty applies to all contracts, requiring parties to act honestly in the performance of their obligations, and therefore would operate to determine whether activation of a termination for convenience clause had been done in good faith.

In Qatar, under Article 707 of the Qatar Civil Code, an employer has a right to terminate a construction contract at any time, and if it does so the contractor is entitled to payment for loss of profit on unperformed works.

In Singapore, clause 31.4(1) of the Public Sector Standard Conditions Of Contract (PSSCOC) issued by the Building and Construction Authority allows the employer to terminate a contract "at any time" by virtue of "a written notice of Termination".

The FIDIC Red Book 1999 contains similar provisions to the PSSCOC form. Under most of the family of JCT contracts, there is no general right to terminate without cause.

Parties to a contract may agree that they will not terminate it during a specified period, but that either party may opt to do so once that period has expired. In the Austrian case of pressetext Nachrichtenagentur GmbH v Republic of Austria (1998), one of the issues addressed at the European Court of Justice was a clause to this effect. The court, referring to the 1992 European Union regulations which were then current, confirmed that an indefinite term contract with an agreement not to terminate for a specified period would not be automatically considered a breach of EU rules.
