= Science school =

Science school may refer to science education in general, or

- A magnet school with a particular focus on education in science
- Science College (specialist schools programme), a United Kingdom school, part of the Specialist Schools Programme, specialising in science
- 'Science School', a Grade 12 program at the Ontario Science Centre
- The sciences faculty at a university
- 'School of Science', a division of the Osaka University
- Philippine Science High School System, a network of public schools in the Philippines which specializes in science education.
- Scientific School, school of scientific views and traditions.
