= G. L. Christian and Associates v. United States =

1963 United States Federal Acquisition Regulation (FAR) court case

- Seal of the United States Court of Federal Claims
- Court: United States Court of Claims
- Full case name: G. L. Christian and Associates v. United States
- Decided: January 11, 1963

Court membership
- Judges sitting: John Marvin Jones, Oscar Hirsh Davis, James Randall Durfee, Don Nelson Laramore, and Samuel Estill Whitaker
- Chief judge: John Marvin Jones

Case opinions
- Decision by: Oscar Hirsh Davis
- Concurrence: John Marvin Jones, James Randall Durfee, Don Nelson Laramore, and Samuel Estill Whitaker

G.L. Christian and Associates v. United States (312 F.2d 418 (Ct. Cl. 1963), cert. denied, 375 U.S. 954, 84 S.Ct. 444) is a 1963 United States Federal Acquisition Regulation (FAR) court case which has become known as the Christian Doctrine. The case held that standard clauses established by regulations may be considered as being incorporated into every Federal contract. Because the FAR is the law, and government contractors are presumed to be familiar with the FAR, a mandatory clause that expresses a significant or deeply ingrained strand of public procurement policy will be incorporated into a Government contract by operation of law, even if the parties intentionally omitted it.

== Case background ==
The Army Corps of Engineers signed a contract with G.L. Christian and Associates to build 2,000 housing units for soldiers at Fort Polk, Louisiana, under the "Capehart Act". Fort Polk was deactivated by the Department of the Army in 1958, and the $32.9 million construction contract was terminated by the Corps of Engineers on February 5, 1958. The contractor responded to the cancellation by submitting claims for costs incurred, settlement expenses, and lost profits. The Dept. of the Army attempted to settle these claims in accordance with the standard “termination for convenience of the government” clause outlined in the Armed Services Procurement Regulations (ASPR). Under this clause, the contractor could claim a profit allowance for work it already had performed, but not for anticipated profits. However, the company argued that because the Army had failed to include this termination for convenience clause in the contract, the Army's cancellation of the project constituted a breach of contract. The contractor claimed that it thus was entitled to common-law damages for breach, including anticipated profits.

An "unusual feature of the case" is that G.L. Christian and Associates were not negatively affected financially in any way by the termination of the Fort Polk contract. G.L. Christian and Associates attempted to assign the entire contract to Zachry and Centex, two "highly competent construction companies with extensive experience in large scale-enterprises" but the Department of the Army took the position that a housing contract under the Capehart Act could not be assigned to another company. At a later conference though, it was agreed that the contract would be transferred to Zachry and Centex with a subcontract by G.L. Christian and Associates. Zachry and Centex became the "de facto prime contractor". After the deactivation, Zachry and Centex sued in the name of G.L. Christian and Associates because they had no privity of contract with the Federal Government, and it could not sue the government in its own name.

== Scope ==
Two years after the filing of G.L. Christian, the U.S. Court of Claims held that the doctrine in the Christian case could be applied for the benefit of a claimant, as well as for the U.S. Government. This court ruled that an appeal was timely when filed within 60 days after a hearing examiner's decision, as required by U.S. Atomic Energy Commission regulations, despite the fact that the contract contained a clause providing that an appeal should be taken within 30 days.

In 1969, the doctrine of G.L. Christian was expanded. In General Services Administration v. Benson, 415 F.2d 878 (9th Cir. 1969), Benson was in a dispute with the Internal Revenue Service over property that he had purchased from the General Services Administration (G.S.A.). Benson filed suit to make the G.S.A. produce various documents needed to present his tax case. The court forbade the G.S.A. from withholding the records, citing a G.S.A. regulation requiring disclosure of records in the absence of a "compelling reason" for non-disclosure.

In contrast, Stanton Kunzi downplays the early expansion of the doctrine of Christian in his book Army Law: "Although Christian was cited in over 100 court and board decisions between 1963 and 1976, in only one of these decisions did an adjudicator incorporate a mandatory contract clause into a contract. (Note: The only case being To the Secretary of the Army, 47 Comp. Gen. 457 February 15, 1968.) In every other decision, the court or board either found that the doctrine of did not mandate incorporation, or resolved the dispute. without addressing the incorporation issue...Until the late 1970s, the doctrine of Christian was considered to be a conceptually intriguing, but practically unattainable, tool...The seed that the Christian court planted in 1963 took almost fifteen years to germinate, but once the seed took root, it flourished. Beginning in the early 1980s, the boards of contract appeals began to apply the doctrine of Christian with increasing frequency."

In 1993, a U.S. District Court of Appeal modified the doctrine of Christian, holding that it only "applies to mandatory contract clauses which express a significant or deeply-ingrained strand of public procurement policy".

== Criticism ==
In the court case S.J. Amoroso Construction Co. v. U.S., 26 Cl. Ct. 759 (1992), Judge Plager wrote an opinion suggesting that the court had used the Christian Doctrine to resolve a case that could have been resolved more satisfactorily using other legal principles. He argued for very limited use of the Christian Doctrine based on the following reasons:

"First, unlike traditional contract doctrines, the Christian doctrine is not tied to the intent of the parties...the Christian doctrine would have courts interpret cases by invoking an abstract notion of a “significant or deeply ingrained strand of public procurement policy”...a standard that can be tied to anything or nothing, and is therefore inherently unpredictable...The purpose of the Christian doctrine, furthermore, does not appear to be the resolution of disputes among parties to contracts, but rather the protection of the Legislative Branch from encroachment by the Executive Branch..."
"Second...by virtue of its dominant role in the marketplace, the Government routinely grants itself privileges - like the right to terminate a contract for the Government's convenience without penalty - that are not available to other contracting parties, and indeed would rarely if ever be seen in an "arms-length" contract between private parties. I see no reason for gratuitously granting the Government an even more favored position in its contract activity, and one based on abstract notions of ‘public policy’; to do so smacks more of autocratic rule than freedom of contract."
"Third, the Christian doctrine...grants the Government authority, without liability, to change its mind post-performance about what a contract was intended to require...Absent predictable contract rights, the market will either refuse to participate, or, more likely, simply increase the price of participation. The Government may save some money in the short run under this principle of “I know my contract rights when I see them," but in the long run the public who pay the costs will be the losers.""

The Nash & Cibinic Report after reporting on several early 1990 Christian Doctrine cases wrote:

"We can't remember an instance where we read more cases and learned less. It is clear that you can't tell a “significant and deeply ingrained strand of procurement policy” when you see it. We don't believe the Federal Circuit knows what it is, and we doubt that the boards will do any better. They have been saved for the last 20 years by being able to mechanically follow the Christian Doctrine to incorporate all mandatory clauses in the contract without analysis or thought. But that day is over. Under the guidance provided by the Federal Circuit, the boards of contract appeals now have to think through each case to determine if the clause meets the General Engineering tests."

== See also ==
- Contract Disputes Act of 1978.
- Habitability, which covers residences with a type of implied warranty.
- Implied warranty
