= E-CERTIS =

e-CERTIS is a free, on-line source of information to help companies and contracting authorities to cope with the different forms of documentary evidence required for cross-border tenders for public contracts in the European Union.

The EU seeks through its procurement regulations to promote the free movement of goods and services across internal borders and recognizes that the variety of certification systems and evidence requirements across the 27 Member States, one Candidate Country (Turkey) and the three European Economic Area (EEA) countries (Iceland, Liechtenstein and Norway) can create unnecessary complication and uncertainty, reducing the attractiveness to businesses of bidding for contracts to supply goods and services to public authorities in a different member state. e-CERTIS therefore exists to help businesses, especially small and medium-sized enterprises, to understand what information is being requested during a procurement exercise.

Similarly, e-CERTIS helps public bodies (contracting authorities) to recognise and process official documents issued in another Member State (such as company registration documents or operating licenses) when they receive them in the context of a public procurement procedure.

e-CERTIS was launched at the end of 2010. Maintenance of the system was initially voluntary on the part of EU member states, but the 2014 Directive on Public Procurement mandated maintenance and use of the system by 18 October 2018 at the latest, 30 months after the deadline for transposition of most elements of the directive. Whilst use of the system to check documents is mandatory, the fact that e-Certis suggests that a document from country A is comparable to another document from country B will not be treated as creating a legally binding obligation to accept the document.
