= CEMS, Inc. v. United States =

American legal case

CEMS, Inc. v. United States, 59 Fed. Cl. 168 (Fed. Cl. 2003) was a government contracting suit before the United States Court of Federal Claims. It deals with the requirements for a contractor to receive an equitable adjustment for work outside the contract.

== Background ==
=== Contract dispute ===
Plaintiff contractor filed suit against defendant United States arising out of a contract for the construction of a bicycle path. The contractor alleged changes, delays and other compensable acts or omissions of the Department of Transportation, Federal Highway Administration (FHWA), and requested an equitable adjustment under the terms of the contract, and such further relief as appropriate. Specifically, the contractor alleged:

1. that the government breached its implied duty to cooperate and its implied duty not to hinder performance. Specifically, the contractor asserted that it was undisputed that issuance of the notice to proceed was delayed three days by government error in providing incorrect bonding amounts to the contractor and 13 days by other government inaction.
2. that the government breached its implied duty to cooperate when delay occurred due to excessive supervision or control of the finishes of the subgrade and aggregate base course.
3. that the government made numerous constructive changes to the contract in the form of additional work ordered to be performed by the project engineer

== Court of Federal Claims ==
The court found:

1. the government did not act unreasonably.
2. that the government did breach its implied duty of cooperation.
3. that the contractor should have been compensated for the additional Roadway Obliteration of asphaltic concrete.

The court also found that the contractor was entitled to an equitable adjustment for the additional 146 tests for asphaltic concrete.

=== Excerpt ===
The United States Court of Appeals for the Federal Circuit has found that "to receive an equitable adjustment from the Government, a contractor must show three necessary elements -- liability, causation, and resultant injury."

CEMS, Inc. v. United States, 59 Fed. Cl. 168, 226 (Fed. Cl. 2003) (emphasis added) (citations omitted).
