= The Nash & Cibinic Report =

- Frequency: Monthly
- Publisher: West Publishing Company
- Founded: 1987
- First issue: January 1987
- Company: Thomson/West
- Country: USA
- Language: English
- OCLC: 321305279

The Nash & Cibinic Report is a monthly periodical providing opinion, insight, and advice on current United States government contract issues. The first issue appeared in January 1987. The report is published monthly by West Publishing Company. It was founded and written by John Cibinic Jr. and Ralph Nash.
