= Equitable adjustment =

An equitable adjustment, in government contracting, is a contract adjustment pursuant to a changes clause, to compensate the contractor expense incurred due to actions of the Government or to compensate the Government for contract reductions. An equitable adjustment includes an allowance for profit; clauses that provide for adjustments, excluding profit, are not considered "equitable adjustments."

== Variations ==
- A "price adjustment" is a change to the established price of the contract arrived at by mutual agreement between the Government and contractor.
- An "adjustment in estimated quantities" is a contract adjustment pursuant to the contract clause on variation in estimated quantities.
- A "bilateral modification" is a supplemental agreement on which the Contracting Officer and the contractor have agreed to a price and/or time adjustment. Contrast a "unilateral modification," a modification on which the Contracting Officer and the contractor cannot agree to a price and/or time adjustment equal to or within the Government Estimate. In such cases the modification containing the adjustment in price and/or time price contained in the Government Estimate may be issued unilaterally, with or without a Contracting Officer's Final Decision. Unilateral modifications are also used to make administrative changes and to issue termination notices.

== In a "changes clause" in government construction contracts ==
Changes clauses give the government the power unilaterally to order contractual modifications; in return, the contract specifies that if the parties are unable to agree on compensation to be received by the contractor for the modified work, the contractor shall be entitled to an equitable adjustment. The goal of an equitable adjustment is to place the contractor in the position he or she would have been in had the change not been encountered. The adjustment should not alter the contractor's profit or loss position from what it was before the change occurred. As mutually agreed by the government and contractor.

== Venues ==
Equitable adjustments are determined by federal agencies. The cornerstone of the regulatory scheme is the Federal Acquisition Regulations System, which comprises the Federal Acquisition Regulation (hereinafter referred to as "FAR"), which are contained in Chapter 1 of Title 48 of the Code of Federal Regulations, and agency regulations supplementing or implementing the FAR. Generally the FAR apply to contract solicitations issued on or after April 1, 1984. Earlier contracts are governed by the prior agency regulations. The principal prior regulations were the Defense Acquisition Regulations and the Federal Procurement Regulations.

There have been several major legislative changes over the years. The Contract Disputes Act of 1978 and the Federal Courts Improvement Act of 1982 established new procedures and remedies for the resolution of disputes between the government and contractors. The Competition in Contracting Act of 1984 (CICA) encourages competitive government procurement procedures.

== Requirement of causation ==
To paraphrase Ralph L. Jones Co. v. United States, 33 Fed. Cl. 327, 331-332 (Fed. Cl. 1995):

The ultimate goal of an equitable adjustment is to do equity; to achieve equity, the government contractor seeking an equitable adjustment bears the "essential burden of establishing the fundamental facts of liability, causation, and resultant injury." It must show that the increased costs arose from work which was materially different from that contemplated by the parties. The increased costs must be the direct and necessary result of the changes.
An equitable adjustment is determined by whether the work was foreseeable based on the information before the contractor at the time of the contract. "Foreseeability" in this instance refers to work that reasonably could be anticipated based on the contemplation of the parties. The question is whether the work would be a foreseeable consequence of those matters the parties "considered with continued attention," regarded thoughtfully, or "viewed . . . as probable or as an . . . intention."See Webster's New International Dictionary, 2d ed. 574 (1955).

== See also ==
- CEMS, Inc. v. United States
