= Greatbatch =

Greatbatch, a surname, may refer to:

- Bruce Greatbatch (1917–1989), British colonial official
- Mark Greatbatch (born 1963), New Zealand cricketer
- Shaun Greatbatch (1969-2022), English darts player
- William Greatbatch, British potter
- Wilson Greatbatch (1919–2011), American inventor
