= Government procurement in the European Union =

Government procurement or public procurement is undertaken by the public authorities of the European Union (EU) and its member states in order to award contracts for public works and for the purchase of goods and services in accordance with principles derived from the Treaties of the European Union. Such procurement represents 13.6% of EU GDP as of March 2023, and has been the subject of increasing European regulation since the 1970s because of its importance to the European single market.

According to a 2011 study prepared for the European Commission by PwC, London Economics and Ecorys, the UK, France, Spain, Germany, Poland and Italy were together responsible for about 75% of all public procurement in the EU and European Economic Area, both in terms of the number of contracts awarded through EU-regulated procedures and in value. The UK awarded the most contracts in value terms and France had the highest number of contracts.

Although the United Kingdom left the EU on 31 January 2020, the existing regulations continued to apply until 31 December 2020 in accordance with the Brexit withdrawal agreement.

== Scale ==
The European Commission estimated in 2023 that government procurement was around €2 trillion, which represented 13.6% of EU GDP. An earlier estimate looking at procurement activity in excess of the thresholds suggested that 3.7% of EU GDP was covered by the full operation of the public procurement directives. A Commission statement issued in 2006 stated that about €80 billion of this expenditure was defence expenditure.

== Legislative history ==
=== Primary legislation ===
The basis of European procurement regulation lies in the provisions of the European Union treaties which prohibit barriers to intra-Union trade, provide the freedom to provide services and the right to establishment (three of the "Four Freedoms"), prohibit discrimination on the basis of national origin and regulate public undertakings and public monopolies. But these rules, being prohibitive in character, proved insufficient to eliminate the protection afforded by the Member States to domestic enterprises by preferential procurement practices. For this, positive regulation through secondary legislation which harmonized the procurement laws of Member States appeared to be needed.

=== First generation of secondary legislation: Supply and Works Directives ===
The European Communities (EC) Council of Ministers adopted General Programmes in 1962 which envisaged the abolition of national quotas and restrictions in public procurement. Directive 66/683/EEC prohibited rules requiring the use of national products or prohibiting the use of foreign products in public procurement, and Directive 70/32 applied the same rule to public supply contracts.

The procedures for awarding public supply contracts were co-ordinated with Directive 77/62/EEC, which introduced three fundamental principles: contracts had to be advertised community-wide, discriminatory technical specifications were prohibited, and tendering and award procedures had to be based on objective criteria. The terms "open procedure" and "restricted procedure" appeared in this directive. However, it did not apply to public utilities, or to products originating outside the EC, until its amendment by Directive 80/767 following Community approval of the 1979 General Agreement on Tariffs and Trade (GATT) Agreement on Government Procurement.

Similar principles of transparency and non-discrimination were applied to the awarding of public works contracts with Directive 71/305, taking the form of the "prohibition of technical specifications that have a discriminatory effect", a requirement for "adequate advertising" and "the fixing of objective criteria for participation"; these, however, did not replace national tendering procedures and practices with a set of common rules.

=== Second generation of secondary legislation and the first Utilities Directive ===
The European Commission's 1985 White Paper for the Completion of the Internal Market identified Member States' public procurement policy and practice as a significant non-tariff barrier to the free circulation of goods and provision of services in Europe because it tended to favour national providers, thereby sheltering markets from competition and distorting trade patterns. The paper and the Single European Act of 1986 which it led to are the conceptual foundation of current EU procurement law.

On this basis, Directive 88/295/EEC amended all previous public supplies directives. (Note: Title 1 amended Directive 77/62/EEC, and Title II deleted a significant portion of Directive 80/767/EEC.) Open tendering procedures were now the norm and negotiated contracts agreed with suppliers chosen by the authority concerned were allowed only in exceptional circumstances. Purchasing authorities now had to publish advance notices of their annual procurement programmes as well as details of each award decision. National technical standards now had to be mutually recognised, and the exempted sectors were more clearly defined.

Directive 89/440 likewise amended the previous public works directives. Their scope of application was widened, now also covering concession contracts and certain state-subsidized works, and consortial participation in contracts was allowed.

The most important change was the adoption of the first Utilities Directive, Directive 90/531, on 17 September 1990. Public utilities – the energy, telecommunications, transport and water sectors – had so far escaped European procurement law harmonisation because of the strongly divergent national legal regimes governing them, and possibly also because their large purchasing volume constituted an instrument of national industrial policy that governments were reluctant to give up. The removal of market access barriers in this sector was largely enabled by the concurrent liberalisation of the European telecommunications industry and by the envisaged global liberalisation of public procurement in the Uruguay Round of GATT negotiations. The first Utilities Directive, which included a requirement for national transposition by 1 July 1992, generally followed the approach of the Supply and Works directives, but provided for the exemption of several sectors such as broadcasting, or for utilities operating under competitive conditions.

Moreover, with the first Remedies Directives, 89/665/EEC (relating to public works and supply contracts) and 92/13/EEC (relating to public utilities), Member States were required to ensure rapid and effective review of decisions made by contracting authorities. Directive 92/13/EEC also introduced an "attestation procedure", offering a means for contracting authorities to certify the compliance of their purchase procedures and practices with procurement law. (Note: The "attestation procedure" was, in fact, "virtually unused". It was abolished by Directive 2007/66/EC in 2007, which set out to "improv[e] the effectiveness of review procedures".)

=== Third generation of secondary legislation: Services Directive and closer alignment ===
Following the official completion of the single market project in 1992, the attention of the European institutions shifted towards the service sector, in view of its ever-increasing macroeconomic importance. The Services Directive, 92/50, attempted to contribute to the liberalisation of public sector services by introducing a régime similar to that governing the procurement of goods, works and by public utilities. It also introduced a new award procedure, the Design Contest. But its scope excluded several specific services, as well as service concessions, which may have been due to certain national constitutional restrictions against the outsourcing of public services. It also distinguished between "priority" services, to which the whole range of procurement disciplines applied, and "non-priority" services, whose procurement was subject only to basic non-discrimination and publicity rules.

On 14 June 1993, the older supplies and works directives and the directive on procurement in the water, energy, transport and telecommunications sectors were re-adopted as Directives 93/36/EEC, 93/37/EEC and 93/38/EEC respectively, with a degree of alignment between them. The aim was to make the legal framework more homogeneous, but the changes to the Works Directive included significant clarification and a special, mitigated régime for the award of concession contracts.

=== Fourth generation of secondary legislation: consolidation ===
In 2004, procurement legislation was consolidated following the principles of simplification and modernisation. The new legal framework was based on a clear-cut dichotomy between utilities and the rest of the public sector. While the procurement of the former remains governed by a new Utilities Directive, Directive 2004/17 "coordinating the procurement procedures of entities operating in the water, energy, transport and postal services sectors", the other three directives were amalgamated into a single "Public Sector Directive", Directive 2004/18 "on the coordination of procedures for the award of public works contracts, public supply contracts and public service contracts", which now governs procurement by public authorities other than utilities. The 2004 directives, apart from simplifying and clarifying the existing law, introduce a new procurement procedure, the competitive dialogue, and allow the procurement of framework agreements. They were required to be transposed into national law by 31 January 2006.

In 2007, the Remedies Directives were also updated by Directive 2007/66/EC, also called "the new remedies directive", which amended Directives 89/665/EEC and 92/13/EEC with regard to improving the effectiveness of review procedures concerning the award of public contracts.

=== Fifth generation: 2014 Directives ===
New Directives on Public Procurement, Utilities Procurement and Concessions were adopted by the European Council on 24 February 2014. The Member States were allowed until 18 April 2016 to transpose the new rules into their national laws (except with regard to e-procurement, where the deadline was September 2018). In the UK, the Public Contracts Regulations 2015 implementing the 2014 Directive on Procurement came into force on 26 February 2015. The Irish Office of Government Procurement undertook a public consultation process between 31 October and 12 December 2014 with a view to transposing the new Directives into Irish law by 17 April 2016.

The 2014 Public Procurement Directive introduced an obligation to take into account accessibility criteria for disabled persons in the specification for any works, goods or services intended for use by the general public or by staff of the contracting authority, unless there was justification for not doing so, and allowed for consideration of third party labels as proof that goods and services met required social and environmental characteristics "linked to the subject-matter of the contract".

On 26 May 2016 the European Commission issued letters of formal notice to 21 member states who had failed to notify the Commission of their transposition of one or more of the three new directives into their national law by the due date. The commission's letter of formal notice was sent to Austria, Belgium, Bulgaria, Croatia, the Czech Republic, Cyprus, Estonia, Ireland, Greece, Latvia, Lithuania, Luxembourg, Malta, the Netherlands, Poland, Portugal, Romania, Slovenia, Finland, Spain and Sweden.

== Aims and principles ==
The European Commission estimates that the elimination of trade barriers resulting from discriminatory and preferential procurement practices may bring about savings to the European economy of about 0.5% of EU GDP, which would be about US$92 billion in 2008. These savings are thought to be the result of three effects: The trade effect represents the actual and potential savings as a result of lower purchase prices than can be had from a broader pool of suppliers. The competition effect represents the improvement, as a result of increased competition, in the efficiency and performance of previously sheltered national firms, and manifests as price convergence. Finally, the restructuring effect represents the long-term structural adjustment of the industries servicing the public sector in reaction to the trade and competition effects.

To effect this, the Public Procurement Directives seek to base procurement on principles "derived from" the European Union Treaty. Within the EU Treaty itself, freedom of movement of goods, freedom of establishment and freedom to provide services are specified; these freedoms, along with free movement of capital, are the "four freedoms" which underpin the European Single Market. In the commission's Interpretative Communication on the Community law applicable to contract awards not or not fully subject to the provisions of the Public Procurement Directives, published in August 2006, it was explained that certain other principles, equal treatment, non-discrimination, mutual recognition, proportionality and transparency, were derived from the Treaty principles and apply to all government procurement within the EU, and should be applied to all purchasing, taking account of proportionality, regardless of the level of expenditure.

=== Strategic use of procurement ===
The European Commission states that public procurement should be used in a "strategic manner", in order to secure value for money and also to contribute to innovation and sustainable, inclusive and competitive economic development. For example, a guidebook on how pre-commercial and commercial procurement can stimulate innovation was proposed by the Commission in 2006, and the 2016 Pact of Amsterdam identified public procurement as one of the means of dealing with the urban challenges facing many European cities.

=== Transparency ===
Transparency in European government procurement is achieved through the publication, in the Official Journal, of three types of notices:

- Prior Information Notices (PIN) giving advance information of a proposed procurement, and details of the procurement procedure to be applied The abbreviation "PIN" also refers to a periodic indicative notice issued for transparency purposes under Article 67 of the Utilities Directive of 2014 whereby "contracting entities may make known their intentions of planned procurement".
- Contract notices are the formal invitations to suppliers to tender offers which initiate the process of awarding a contract.
- Contract Award Notices (CAN) notify the public about the award of a contract to a successful tenderer, including the price and the reason for the selection.

The European Court of Justice (ECJ) stated in 2004 that the principle of transparency "flows from" the principle of equal treatment which is stated in the [directives], and both require that "the subject matter of each contract and the criteria governing its award ... be clearly defined".

Transparency should enhance price competition among suppliers, resulting in lower purchase prices, because publication makes more suppliers aware of business opportunities, and they also know that their competitors will also have seen the opportunity. CANs also send important price signals to the market. However, the increased competition may drive down prices down to a level where poor quality or predatory pricing become concerns. It also wastes effort on the part of the many unsuccessful tenderers and of the authority who has to evaluate many tenders.

A document issued for transparency purposes and in order to prevent or mitigate a challenge to a contract awarded without a suitable competitive process is called a Voluntary Ex-Ante Transparency Notice or VEAT Notice.

Whilst it is lawful for a public authority to abandon or recommence a procurement procedure, Article 55 of the 2014 Directive (Article 41 of the 2004 Directive) requires notification of the reasons for such a decision to be notified to candidates and tenderers as soon as possible. The UK case of APCOA Parking v City of Westminster (2010), to which the 2004 Directive applied, identified several ECJ rulings where the right to abandon a procurement exercise had been considered. Sue Arrowsmith notes that contracting authority errors would justify an abandonment, as would a recognition that a new procedure would be likely to secure a better outcome for the authority.

=== De minimis thresholds ===
In part because of the above-mentioned problem, the Directives apply only to contracts whose value (excluding VAT) exceeds certain thresholds. Other contracts, whose value is considered de minimis, are not required to be awarded under the Directives' procedures, although the basic rules of the European Union Treaties, such as non-discrimination, still apply.

The European Commission's most recent list of thresholds was published in 2025 and apply for the two-year period which started on 1 January 2026. There are six different thresholds, which apply to various types of public body or utility, and according to the types of goods and services being procured:

- €140,000
- €216,000
- €432,000
- €750,000
- €1,000,000
- €5,404,000.

For Member States which do not use the Euro, national values for each threshold are determined and published bi-annually by the Commission.

The de minimis principle allows authorities to avoid an expensive and lengthy tendering and award procedure for low-value contracts, where the costs of the procedure could exceed the public welfare benefits of the increased transparency and competition associated with the procedure. A 1995 Commission study shows that this "sub-dimensional" public purchasing, which remains unaffected by the procedural disciplines of the Directives, appears to be at least three times the size of "dimensional" (i.e., above-threshold) purchasing. Nevertheless, the Commission's Interpretative Communication of 2006 confirmed that the principles of equal treatment, non-discrimination, mutual recognition, proportionality and transparency remain applicable to contracting where there is expected to be cross-border interest. The Commission's advice in relation to expenditure funded from the European Structural and Investment Funds (ESIFs) is to advertise using OJEU, a national public procurement web-site or a well-known public procurement web-site where contracts "have a potential for cross-border interest". UK national guidance implementing the EU's advice notes that an assessment of no cross-border interest could be justified, for example, by reference to the subject matter of the procurement, the value of a proposed contract, the geographical location of its proposed performance or specific market information meaning that there would be no such interest.

The de minimis principle also provides an incentive for authorities to divide contracts into separate lots for the purpose of avoiding bothersome procedures. Although the Directives prohibit doing this, such avoidance of procurement law is difficult to detect and enforce. As of 2007 no case relating to it had ever been before the ECJ, and it is thought to be mainly responsible for the observed low percentage of all public contracts that are published in the Official Journal.

=== Mandatory exclusion ===
Regulation 57 provides for companies who have committed certain offences to be excluded from the supplier appraisal process and their tenders rejected. Mandatory exclusion applies in relation to offences relating to corruption, bribery, money laundering, taxation offences, people trafficking and drug trafficking.

The EU's fifth package of sanctions against Russia, responding to Russia's invasion of Ukraine, bans Russian nationals and entities from entering into procurement contracts with EU public bodies, except in limited cases "where there is no viable alternative".

=== Discretionary exclusion ===
The same regulation also allows contracting authorities to exclude businesses from the supplier appraisal process and reject their tenders where they have committed offences or undertaken activities relating to misrepresentation, undue influence on procurement procedures, grave professional misconduct, agreements to distort competition or demonstrated significant or persistent deficiencies in the performance of a public contract which led to early termination of that contract.

=== Self-cleaning ===
Regulation 57(13)-(17) recognises that businesses may have addressed the reasons why they may have previously committed excludable offences and demonstrated that they should now be considered a reliable and suitable business for performance of a public contract. The provision of evidence to this effect is known as 'self-cleaning'. To take advantage of this provision, businesses must demonstrate that they have paid fines or provided compensation for damages, "clarified the facts and circumstances in a comprehensive manner by actively collaborating with the investigating authorities" and taken appropriate steps relating to their organisation, policies, procedures and personnel to address the cause of previous failings.

=== Reliance on the capacities of other entities ===
An entity wishing to tender or to demonstrate that it meets the selection criteria (economic and financial standing, and technical and professional ability) for being invited to tender may rely on the capacities of one or more other entities, for example if it intends to sub-contract part of the delivery in an area where it lacks sufficient skills and resources. The 2014 Directive and its predecessor note the following points in relation to reliance on other entities:

- reliance is to be assessed in relation to the requirements of a specific contract
- an intention to rely on another entity does not depend any specific form of legal connection between the tenderer and the entities on which it wishes to rely
- an entity may only rely on educational and professional qualifications or experience if they relate to the work that the supporting entity will undertake
- the entity must prove to the contracting authority concerned that it has access to the resources necessary, e.g. by providing evidence of a commitment made by those entities
- if the supporting entity does not meet the selection criteria or needs to be excluded under a mandatory exclusion, the supporting entity can be replaced by another suitable entity
- where reliance on another entity relates to the tenderer's economic or financial standing, the contracting authority may require that supporting entity to accept joint liability for the execution (i.e. performance) of the contract.

A provision was added into the 2014 Directive stating that for works contracts, service contracts and siting or installation operations in the context of a "supply-and-fit" contract, a contracting authority may require that certain critical tasks be performed directly by the tenderer itself or, where the tender is submitted by a group of economic operators ... by a participant in that group".

=== Contractual performance or execution ===
In a statement dating from 2001, the Commission has noted that the use of contractual clauses concerning "the manner in which a contract will be executed" currently fell outside the scope of the public procurement directives. Article 70 of the 2014 Directive limits "special conditions relating to the performance of a contract" by ensuring that they are linked to the subject matter of the contract and publicised in the contract documents or contract notice.

=== Termination of contract ===
Article 73 requires public authorities to include terms in public contracts which allow the contract to be terminated if its award or subsequent variation should not have taken place for reasons directly connected with the procurement regulations. These terms should deal with the mechanism for, and consequences of, termination. In the absence of such a term, a power for the contracting authority to terminate the contract on reasonable notice will be implied.

=== Social considerations ===
The Commission issued an "interpretative communication" in October 2001 aiming to "clarify the range of possibilities under the existing Community legal framework for integrating social considerations into public procurement". Provisions on employment rights and working conditions were identified as relevant social considerations in this document. (Note: See also the European Commission's parallel Interpretative Communication on the Community law applicable to public procurement and the possibilities for integrating environmental considerations into public procurement, published on 4 July 2001.) Article 70 of the 2014 Directive specifically notes that contractual performance clauses may include appropriate social and environmental considerations.

=== Electronic processes in public procurement ===
Regulation 22 of the 2015 Regulations came into effect on 18 October 2018, requiring that all communication and information with bidders, including tender submissions, should be performed using electronic means.

Directive 2014/55/EU of the European Parliament and European Council on electronic invoicing in public procurement (16 April 2014) applies to electronic invoices issued as a result of the performance of contracts to which Directive 2009/81/EC, Directive 2014/23/EU, Directive 2014/24/EU or Directive 2014/25/EU applies. This directive aims to secure the development and implementation of a European standard on electronic invoicing.

== Procedures ==
There are several different procedures available for public authorities. These include the Open, Restricted, Negotiated and Competitive Dialogue procedures. Each of these procedures sets its own limitations on the procuring authority, which must be considered when choosing the appropriate procedure. Contracting authorities have "a degree of choice" as to which procedure they follow for each procurement exercise, but "once they have issued an invitation to tender under one particular procedure, they are required to observe the rules applicable to it until the contract has been finally awarded".

The procedure is intended to be fully transparent with the intention of creating a free and competitive Europe-wide market. The rules state that for projects above a certain financial threshold (about €100K) a contract notice must be published in Supplement S of the Official Journal of the European Union OJEU previously known as [OJEC S-Series]. Nowadays the information is available immediately on the web from Tenders Electronic Daily ('TED'). Regulated minimum timescales apply, which vary according to the procedure chosen; if "a state of urgency duly substantiated by the contracting authority" makes it impracticable to comply with the relevant time limit, then an "accelerated procedure" may be followed, typically allowing a time limit of not less than 15 days "where a state of urgency duly substantiated by the contracting authority renders [the ordinary timescale] impracticable. The facility to use an accelerated open procedure was introduced in the 2014 directive: under the 2004 directive this facility was only available in conjunction with the restricted and negotiated procedures.

The EU refers to third party communication systems with functionality which can submit notifications to OJEU as "TED eSenders". In 2007, the European Commission issued an instruction intended to ensure that links to intermediaries' websites within published contract notices led directly to the relevant tender documents and not to a promotional website or one which requires registration.

The buyer can advertise the contract more widely, but cannot do so before it has dispatched a notice for publication in the OJEU, and is forbidden from including information not also included in the OJEU publication.

After the prescribed date, the bids are opened and assessed, and either the "lowest cost" or "most economically advantageous tender" is chosen. The contract award must also be reported in the OJEU and be published electronically on Tenders Electronic Daily ('TED').

The system is under constant revision to avoid misuse. Rejected bidders are granted up to ten days to challenge a decision, and the European Commission routinely acts to police infringements.

== Professionalisation ==
The European Commission issued a recommendation in October 2017 directed towards the "long-term professionalisation" of Member States' public procurement, so that they could "attract, develop and retain" staff in public purchasing roles, focus on performance and "make the most of the available tools and techniques". The Commission anticipated that Member States would implement their own professionalisation strategies but chose not to prescribe any specific model because the Member States are "at different stages of their journey". A "Toolbox of Good Practices" was published at the same time.

== Special forms of procurement ==
=== Framework agreements ===
Public contracting authorities may enter into framework agreements with one or more businesses, which prescribe the terms and conditions which would apply to any subsequent contract and make provision for selection and appointment of a contractor by reference directly to the agreed terms and conditions or by holding a competition inviting only the partners to the framework agreement to submit specific commercial proposals. These are not in themselves procurement contracts, but they set out the terms of such contract with suppliers in advance over a set time.

The 2004 Public Sector Directive codified rules for the procurement of goods and services through framework agreements, and the 2014 Directive amended these rules. Under the 2004 Directive, either one economic operator or more than three were to be party to a framework agreement, but the 2014 Directive also allowed a framework agreement to operate with just two economic operators. The term of a framework agreement may not usually exceed 4 years, "save in exceptional cases duly justified, in particular by the subject-matter of the framework agreement".

=== Dynamic purchasing systems ===
Provision is made in article 34 of the 2014 Directive for contracting authorities to use a dynamic purchasing system (DPS) for the purchase of commonly used items which are "generally available on the market" and which can meet their needs. As defined within this article, a single dynamic system used by a contracting authority could operate across a range of goods, works and services, divided into appropriate and objectively defined categories. A system must be operated as a completely electronic procedure.

DPS systems differ from framework agreements in that suitable new suppliers can join a DPS at any time. A survey of public sector organisations reported by the UK's Local Government Association in May 2017 identified the benefits attributable to use of a DPS as flexibility, cost savings, the ability to stimulate markets and scope to improve access to contracts for "harder-to-reach suppliers".

=== Competitive procedure with negotiation ===
A competitive procedure allowing for negotiation with companies before finalisation of their tenders was introduced through Article 29 of the 2014 Directive. This sits alongside the competitive dialogue procedure inherited from the 2004 directive and either is available to contracting authorities to use when readily available solutions do not meet their needs or where the legal and financial nature of the intended contract needs to be ascertained through negotiation. Contracting authorities using the competitive procedure with negotiation (CPN) are required to provide the market with a description of their needs, the characteristics of the goods, works or services to be procured, and the award criteria which will ultimately be used to determine which business is to be awarded the contract to supply. Companies are invited through a contract notice or prior indicative notice to express interest in being invited to tender, and selected companies are then invited to submit an initial tender. Negotiations may take place between the contracting authority and each business in order to "improve the content" of each tender, before invitations are issued to submit a final tender, but the CPN also allows authorities to dispense with negotiation if the best proposal is satisfactory, subject to giving notice that the authority wishes to retain this option. Final tenders are then evaluated against the previously published award criteria and a contract awarded.

The CPN is primarily to be used in cases where the contracting authority's needs cannot be met through use of 'readily available solutions' without their adaptation, where there is a design or innovation element to the goods, works or services to be procured, where the nature, complexity or legal and financial aspects of contractual risk demand a negotiated solution. For example, on 3 June 2016, Bridgend County Borough Council issued an invitation to express interest in participating in a competitive procurement with negotiation for waste collection services which allowed for "a staged procedure to gradually reduce the number of solutions to be discussed or tenders to be negotiated" prior to contract award, but also gave the Council an option to award the contract on the basis of the initial tenders without conducting any negotiations.

In addition, where a procurement procedure for goods, works or services falling outside the above criteria has been undertaken and only "irregular" or unacceptable tenders have been received, the directive allows authorities to adopt the competitive procedure with negotiation as the next stage of the procurement process. "Irregular" tenders are those which do not comply with the procurement documents, which were received late, where there is evidence of collusion or corruption, or which have been found by the contracting authority to be abnormally low.

=== Negotiated procedure without publication ===
The "negotiated procedure without publication" allows contracts to be awarded without publication of an OJEU contract notice "in the most urgent cases", but the circumstances allowing the use of this process are limited and should be "interpreted restrictively". In Case C-275/08 relating to use of the 1993 supplies directive, Germany was found to have misused the provision for awarding a contract without prior publication of a contract notice. In 2015 the European Commission issued guidance advising on how public procurement rules could be used in connection with the then-current "asylum crisis", recognising that "in many Member States, the number of persons seeking asylum has increased significantly [and unforseeably], but whether this allowed Member States to conclude that "compliance with general deadlines" was impossible needed to be assessed on a case-by-case basis.

=== Public-private partnerships ===
Public-private partnerships are not subject to special rules in EU procurement law, but must follow the rules and principles resulting from the European Treaties, including those embodied in secondary legislation. In 2000, the European Commission published an "interpretative communication on concessions under Community law", and in 2004 it published a "Green Paper on public-private partnerships and Community law on public contracts and concessions", which takes stock of existing practices from the perspective of European law and is intended to launch a debate on whether a specific legal framework should be drawn up at the European level.

The competitive dialogue procedure was created with the aim of making the award of public-private partnerships easier, since before its creation, a Contracting Authority faced the choice of the restricted procedure, which is often too inflexible for such contracts, or the negotiated procedure, which is intended to be an exceptional procedure with specific legal justifications. Its use so far in the EU, has, however, been uneven. Up to June 2009, more than 80% of the award procedures using competitive dialogue have been launched in two EU Member States i.e. France and the United Kingdom.

=== Design contests ===
Articles 78 to 82 of the 2014 Directive (Regulations 78 to 82 in the UK Regulations) provide for the conduct of a design contest, which may be either a stage in a procurement process leading to the award of a services contract, or a competition for which a prize is to be awarded or payment to be made. The Directive suggests that design contests are held "mainly in the fields of town and country planning, architecture and engineering or data processing". A Design Contest Notice must be issued in the OJEU. Where a jury is used to assess the plans and projects submitted by candidate businesses, it must consider the plans anonymously and retain minutes of any clarification discussions which take place with candidates.

==== Example ====
The Danish Herlev Hospital issued a Design Contest Notice on 13 April 2016 for the design of the Steno Diabetes Center Copenhagen, intending to award a service contract to the winner or winners of the contest.

=== Innovation partnerships ===
The 2014 Directive provides for a new type of contract, the Innovation Partnership, whereby businesses are invited to submit "research and innovation projects aimed at meeting the needs identified by the contracting authority that cannot be met by existing solutions". An Innovation Partnership is a contractual relationship formed between a public body and one or more businesses which enables the public body and the business(es) to work together through a partnership agreement in order to develop new products, works or services, where these are not already available on the market.

Innovation Partnerships were first endorsed among a series of public procurement reforms introduced in the 2014 Directive, and implemented in the UK's Public Contracts Regulations 2015. The EU is expected to publish its guidance in 2016 as to how it sees Innovation Partnerships working and other EU states are expected to implement the new regulations by April 2016. Innovation Partnerships are likely to be long-term in nature and may involve contracts across three phases covering research and proof of concept, an intermediate development phase and a purchase phase. The European Parliament welcomed the new option as an opportunity 'to strengthen innovative solutions in public procurement' by 'allow[ing] public authorities to call for tenders to solve a specific problem without pre-empting the solution, thus leaving room for the contracting authority and the tenderer to come up with innovative solutions together'.

The European Commission issued guidance in May 2018 noting that the Innovation Partnership is just one of a number of routes a public authority may consider in order to procure an innovative product or service.

==== Objectives ====
The promotion of innovation forms part of the European Union's Europe 2020 ten-year growth strategy. The EU seeks "to create an innovation-friendly environment that makes it easier for great ideas to be turned into products and services that will bring our economy growth and jobs" and the objectives of Innovation Partnerships can be seen as:

- to open up this process within the context of public procurement
- to help resolve societal challenges
- to overcome the problem which arose under previous public procurement directives whereby public bodies could partner with private businesses to develop innovative solutions but once these were developed they were required to reopen competition before awarding a contract, therefore could not commit in advance to purchasing goods and services from any company they were supporting with product development.

==== Process ====
To commence the process of establishing an Innovation Partnership, a contracting authority must publish a Contract Notice in the Official Journal of the European Union (OJEU), which will 'identify the need for an innovative product, service or works that cannot be met by purchasing products, services or works already available on the market, and indicate which elements of this description define the minimum requirements to be met by all tenders'. There is a 30-day statutory minimum period from dispatch of the Contract Notice to the OJEU office to the closing date for requests from businesses wishing to participate in the process. From the companies who have asked to participate within the application period, the contracting authority will select suitable businesses based on objective criteria, which must include "capacity in the field of research and development and of developing and implementing innovative solutions". At least three businesses must be selected provided that there are three suitably qualified businesses interested.

The selected businesses will then be invited to submit "research and innovation projects aimed at meeting the needs identified by the contracting authority that cannot be met by existing solutions". Once project proposals have been received, the contracting authority will assess them against pre-determined and published criteria and may select one or more projects to proceed. For any project that the contracting authority wishes to pursue, they will then negotiate a contract with the project proposers which is likely to cover:

- the scope of the project
- the value and terms of the contracting authority's financial investment
- provisions for intellectual property rights and confidentiality
- provisions for terminating the innovation partnership with the business concerned.

At intermediate stages, the number of businesses involved in the partnership may be reduced, for example, where proof of concept stages do not produce satisfactory or economic proposals which the contracting authority would contemplate purchasing in due course. Once a product or service has been developed which meets the contracting authority's needs, each of the partners is invited to submit a final and non-negotiable tender for the manufacture and supply of the products to the contracting authority or for performance of the service, and these tenders are evaluated to identify which offers the best combination of price and quality with a view to one of them being awarded a long-term supply contract.

==== Responses ====
Initial expectations are that the procedure will see limited use. Concerns have been raised by some commentators, particularly in relation to the potentially anti-competitive effect of the procedure.

==== Examples ====
Examples are limited to date. On 23 July 2015 The Christie NHS Foundation Trust based in Manchester issued a Prior Indicative Notice regarding an intention to procure "a patient information/entertainment platform delivering patient tailored content over wireless infrastructure to mobile devices within the Trust" and stated that the Trust "intends to use the Innovation Partnership procedure for any subsequent procurement process" and wishes "to enter a long-term partnership with an organisation to develop a new patient focused extensible information/entertainment platform.". Worcestershire County Council issued a Prior Indicative Notice on 16 December 2015 seeking to appoint up to five businesses interested in "developing, test[ing] and bring[ing] to the market innovative technology in care solutions".

=== Joint procurement ===
The 2014 Directive makes provision for "occasional joint procurement", whereby two or more contracting authorities undertake an entire procurement process or aspects of it together, including occasions when contracting authorities from different EU member states undertake procurement jointly. The Directive makes provision for authorities to assume joint responsibility for compliance with regulations applicable to the procurement process. According to the commission's 2017 Communication ... on Making Public Procurement work in and for Europe, only 11% of procurement procedures are conducted by cooperative procurement procedures; the Commission considers that this low level rate of aggregation suggests that opportunities are being missed. A report commissioned by the European Parliament's Committee on the Internal Market and Consumer Protection (IMCO) has recommended that Member States "should consider creating Central Purchasing Bodies (CPBs)" in order to secure "coherent and coordinated procurement".

=== Light touch regime ===
The light touch regime (LTR) is a specific set of rules for certain service contracts which tend to be of limited interest to cross-border competition. Those service contracts include certain social, health and education services, defined by Common Procurement Vocabulary (CPV) codes. The list of services to which the regime applies is set out in Annex XIV of Directive 2014/24/EU. This regime, referred to in the directive as "the light regime", allows for significantly fewer procedural limitations and only applies to services contracts valued over €750,000 (£615,278 in the UK).

=== Exceptions ===
The Teckal exception (or exemption), derived from a 1999 ECJ ruling, allows a contracting authority to award a contract directly to a separate entity provided these two requirements are both met:

- the public authority awarding the contract must exercise control over the separate entity, to an extent similar to the control which the public authority exercises over its own departments (the "similar control" requirement), and
- a substantial part, at least 80%, of the activities of the separate entity must be carried out for the public authority awarding the contract.

The Hamburg Waste exception applies to genuine inter-authority agreements through which separate entities, each with a public service duty to perform, agree to carry out that duty together, where the cooperation is governed only by consideration relating to the public interest. In the Hamburg waste case, four German district administrations, Rotenburg (Wümme), Harburg, Soltau-Fallingbostel and Stade, signed a contract with the City of Hamburg for waste disposal without a call for tenders. The ECJ found that public-public co-operation could be exempt from the public procurement rules where:

- the arrangement involves only contracting authorities (i.e., there is no participation of private capital);
- the nature of the agreement is one of genuine cooperation aimed at the joint performance of a common task, as opposed to a normal public contract; and
- co-operation is governed only by considerations relating to the public interest.

A third exception has been identified through the case of Remondis GmbH & Co. KG Region Nord v. Region Hannover. The Oberlandesgericht Celle (Higher Regional Court of Celle, Germany) made a request for a preliminary ruling under Article 267 of the Treaty on the Functioning of the European Union (TFEU) in this case. The Hannover region and the city of Hanover, the state capital, had delegated their waste management responsibilities and powers to a special purpose association created by themselves to take on these responsibilities.

In Datenlotsen Informationssysteme GmbH v Technische Universität Hamburg-Harburg, the ECJ was asked to consider whether the Teckal exception could be extended to "horizontal" in-house contracts between a public contracting authority and a body wholly owned by the German state.

In an earlier 1999 ruling, the fifth chamber of the European Court stated that article 55 of the EC Treaty (now article 45 of TFEU) did not apply to situations where "all the facts [of the case] are confined to within a single Member State" and therefore the freedom of movement for persons and freedom to provide services are not engaged. This case, also a waste collection case, did not concern the award of a public contract to a third party for the latter to provide a service, but the selection of a financial company to become a partner in a mixed-capital company with a majority public shareholding, which would then provide the waste collection service. RI.SAN. srl, an Italian company, challenged the Comune of Ischia's selection of Ischia Ambiente to provide its waste services. Ischia Ambiente was funded partly by GEPI SpA, an Italian public body, and partly by the comune itself: thus the Court found that there were no cross-border issues raised by the case.

In 2014, the European Court ruled that "where the contractor ... is a non-profit association which, at the time of the award of the contract, has as partners not only public sector entities but also private social solidarity institutions carrying out non-profit activities, the requirement for 'similar control' ... is not met". This ruling was declared in relation to a Portuguese case whereby Eurest (Portugal) (Sociedade Europeia de Restaurantes Lda) had challenged the award of a hospital catering contract by Centro Hospitalar de Setúbal to Serviço de Utilização Comum dos Hospitais (SUCH) without a tender exercise. SUCH was established by legislative decree and enjoyed a "public service mission" concerned with the efficiency of the Portuguese National Health Service, but its ownership and management involved both a number of public authorities and a number of charitable organisations: of 88 partners in total, 23 were non-governmental organisations in the "social sector". The court argued that the participation of non-governmental interests meant that there was opportunity for SUCH to pursue interests which may be "commendable", but not the same as the interests of the public authorities, and although those interests were not the same as the profit motive driving private sector capital interests, they still meant that the "similar control" requirement had not been met.

The 2014 Directive incorporated the Teckal case law into article 12, which outlines circumstances in which a public contract falls outside the scope of the Directive.

=== Defence procurement ===
Article 223(1) of the EEC Treaty (renumbered as Article 296 by the Amsterdam Treaty) allowed member states to exclude the procurement of arms, munitions and war materials from the general principles of competition because of their importance for national security. A list known as the "1958 list", a "Common Military" list of arms, munitions and war materials, was mandated by the treaty (Article 223(2)) and drawn up in an unpublished decision of 31 March 1958 and formalised in Decision 255/58 of 15 April 1958. The list was released in 2001 in response to a written Parliamentary question asked by Belgian MEP Bart Staes, which identified 15 different categories of arms, equipment and other materials.

Procurement of arms, munitions, war materiel and related works and services acquired for defence purposes and procurement of sensitive supplies, works and services required for security purposes is now subject to EU Directive 2009/81/EC on defence and sensitive security procurement, not the Directives on Public Procurement. The purpose of the directive is to balance the need for transparency and openness in defence markets within the European Single Market with the need to protect individual countries' security interests. The European Commission has been working to improve cross-border access for small and medium-sized enterprises in defence contracts and on 20 April 2018 the Commission published a Recommendation on cross-border market access for sub-suppliers and SMEs in the defence sector, calling for earlier and clearer publication of information regarding member states' long-term plans and priorities in defence procurement.

== Infrastructure procurement ==
An "Ex-ante Assessment Mechanism", introduced in November 2017, allows the European Commission and contracting authorities to share information about the public procurement aspects of various infrastructure projects. The mechanism was established via the European Commission's Communication on "Helping investment through a voluntary ex-ante assessment of the procurement aspects for large infrastructure projects" of 3 November 2017, and includes a helpdesk, notification mechanism and information exchange mechanism, whose shared aim is to help public authorities manage large procurement projects as efficiently as possible, irrespective of whether they are funded by the EU itself or not.

== Third country access ==
"Third country access" refers to access to a common market by goods, services or traders who are based outside the common market borders, for example countries which are not part of the European Union and have not negotiated an international agreement which includes market access commitments.

Resolutions were adopted by the European Council on 21 December 1976 (referenced in Directive 77/62/EEC issued on the same date) and 22 July 1980 regarding non-member state access to community public supply contracts, which noted the scope for individual Member States to apply their own commercial policy measures but also anticipated a Commission proposal on the "co-ordination and progressive standardization" of policies.

The European Commission put forward an international procurement policy proposal in 2012 which would have established a Regulation on the access of third country goods and services to the EU's internal market in the field of public procurement. The proposed regulation would also have addressed access of EU goods and services to the public procurement markets of third countries. An amended proposal was put forward in 2016. As an EU Regulation it would have been directly applicable within EU Member States, including the United Kingdom at the time.

The regulation would have enabled contracting authorities to reject high value tenders (over €5m) with more than 50% third country content, subject to European Commission approval, and allow the commission to restrict access to EU public procurement markets where third countries did not offer open access to EU companies to compete for public contracts. The UK government at the time was "strongly opposed" to restrictions on third country access to EU markets, fearing that "tit-for-tat protectionism" would result.

Significant reservations were expressed by members and committee rapporteurs in the European Parliament. The Commission published an amended proposal in 2016, which maintained the position that world procurement markets lacked a "level playing field".

An International Procurement Instrument (IPI) covering this issue was adopted by the Council of the European Union in June 2022. Regulation (EU) 2022/1031 of the European Parliament and of the Council of 23 June 2022 gave expression to the Council's IPI principles, allowing the Commission to investigate allegations of third-country restrictive or nonreciprocal activities, consult with the third country concerned, and if necessary "adopt ... an IPI measure in the form of a score adjustment or of an exclusion of tenders".

== Administration ==
Within the European Commission's operations, public procurement policy is administered by unit GROW.C.2 within the Directorate-General for Internal Market, Industry, Entrepreneurship and SMEs, located in Brussels.

== Bibliography ==
- Bovis, Christopher H. (2007). EU Public Procurement Law. Elgar European Law Series. Edward Elgar Publishing. ISBN 9781847209474.
- Burnett, Michael; Oder, Martin (2009). Competitive dialogue: a practical guide (PDF). Maastricht: European Institute of Public Administration. ISBN 9789067792141. Archived from the original (PDF) on 25 April 2020.
- Sanchez Graells, Albert (2015). Public procurement and the EU competition rules (2nd ed.). Oxford, United Kingdom: Hart Publishing. ISBN 9781782259992.
- "Applying the Teckal exemption". Thomson Reuters Public Sector Blog. 21 November 2008.
- "CIPFA article – Teckal: The basics explained". Chartered Institute of Public Finance and Accountancy. 8 June 2016.
- Sarter, Eva Katharina (Winter 2015). "The legal framework of contracting: gender equality, the provision of services and European Public Procurement Law". Wagadu: A Journal of Transnational Women's and Gender Studies. 14. SUNY Cortland: 55–83. ISSN 1545-6196. Archived from the original on 25 March 2018. Pdf.

== See also ==
- Government procurement – includes details of transposition of EU procurement law into the legal regimes of each EU member state.
- List of European Court of Justice rulings, especially sections covering the procurement procedures of entities operating in the water, energy, transport and postal services sectors, and public procurement
- E-CERTIS, an information system to identify different certificates requested in procurement procedures across the EU.
- European Single Procurement Document, an electronic self-declaration document for suppliers interested in tendering.
