= Adjustment clause =

In insurance, an adjustment clause in a contract specifies how the amount of a claim (particularly a claim against an insurance company) will be determined for the purposes of a settlement, giving consideration to objections made by the debtor or insurance company, as well as the allegations of the claimant in support of his claim.

For example:

- In fire insurance, an adjustment clause provides that in the event of loss or damage at any location mentioned in the policy, the amount of insurance in force at that location shall be prorated to the burned and unburned portions of the property. Also known as a burned and unburned clause.
- In life insurance, an age adjustment clause specifies that if the age of the insured has been understated, the amount payable upon his death shall be that amount which the premium charged would have purchased for the insured's correct age.

Adjustment of claims is not confined to claims against insurance companies. An allowance made by a creditor, particularly a storekeeper, in response to a complaint by the debtor respecting the accuracy of the account or other claim, or a reduction in the claim or account made to induce a prompt payment, is in a proper sense an adjustment.
