= Scientific school =

Scientific school (school of scientific traditions) is an established system of scientific views, as well as a scientific community adhering to these views. The formation of a scientific school occurs under the influence of a leader, whose erudition, range of interests, and working style are decisive for attracting new collaborators. Relationships within such a scientific team facilitate the exchange of information at the level of ideas (rather than final research results), which significantly increases the efficiency of creative scientific work.

== History ==
At the stage of protoscience, the schools that existed at that time could act as independent centers or institutes. Later, scientific schools came to be understood as real informal collectives of scientists.

In antiquity, schools of arts and philosophical thought arose, such as the Aristotelian Peripatetics.

In the Middle Ages, the printing press created an important technical prerequisite for the emergence of schools of thought spanning several geographical centers. This facilitated the process of learning and disseminating the ideas of different schools. Each of them acquired a propaganda tool - periodically published collections, journals, bulletins, and other scientific periodicals. Its own printed organ is a significant feature of a school of scientific thought. It is reflected in the history of science and facilitates the search for scientific results of its activities.

Michael Polanyi is considered one of the founders of Western sociology of knowledge, having explored the problems of scientific traditions, scientific schools, and issues of intrascientific communication.

Modern scientific schools are often universities. Their structural units, departments, are analogues of creative workshops, and the scientists heading them (usually professors) are the masters themselves, the "first persons" of the schools, who often subsequently lend their famous names to them. No less significant in scientific terms, schools arise in different countries around academic research centers and research institutes.

Distinguished two meanings:

1. a hierarchical and self-reproducing scientific community that has made a major contribution to world science;
2. a community occupying a certain niche in national science, reproducing itself in new generations of specialists, and distinguished by a certain methodology.

According to biochemist Garry Abelev, if in the mid-20th century a clear division of scientists into schools was visible, this rather referred to the pre-paradigm period, whereas now, when paradigms have been established,

There are fewer and fewer schools because all our knowledge is becoming more structured. Schools perhaps remain as organizational associations - laboratories, departments where, due to low staff turnover, stable groups of employees are maintained for many years. They develop a certain similarity in views, in criteria, and this, in my opinion, is more like schools. But in general, in my opinion, in immunology and virology, schools are blurring, dissolving in the general structure of knowledge of a given field.

== Characteristics ==
A school implies the presence of a scientific leader (a teacher or an idea, after his death) and followers (students). Scientific schools also may become centers of development, influencing scientific progress.

Schools are a symptom of the immaturity of a science. With the establishment of a paradigm and the transition to "normal" science, schools leave the stage. A commonality of theoretical and methodological positions of all representatives of a given science is established.

The issue of the life cycles of scientific schools is the least developed in the scientific literature. Sometimes they cease to exist simply due to lack of funding. However, when determining leading schools, their life cycle is often not taken into account, so often renowned but stagnant schools receive support, rather than emerging and highly promising scientific schools.

The degeneration of scientific schools (their decline) occurs in two main forms: bureaucratization and commercialization. Both of these forms are associated with the modernization and modification of existing results, and boil down to project management instead of scientific search, which kills creativity, and consequently the scientific school itself.

== Official status ==
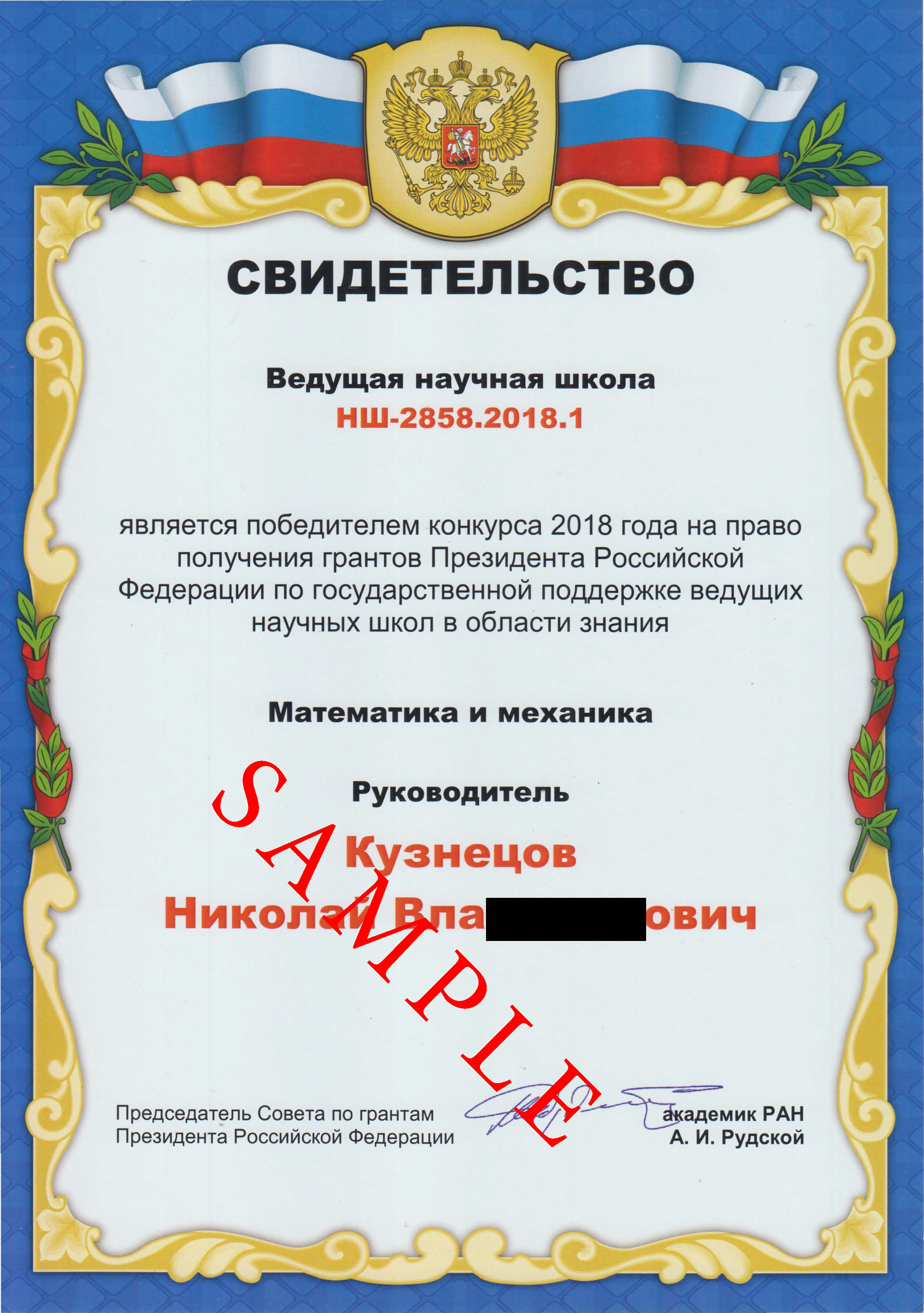
Certificate of a "Leading Scientific School" of the Russian Federation

Since 1995 to the present, in Russia, the status of "Leading Scientific School of the Russian Federation" is awarded to scientific teams (which have gained fame for their high level of research in a recognized and sufficiently broad scientific direction, stability of traditions, continuity of generations in the training of highly qualified scientific personnel) based on the results of a competitive selection by the Council for Grants of the President of the Russian Federation and the Russian Ministry of Education and Science.

In some countries, for example, Finland and Norway, a close analogue is the status of Center of Excellence (CoE).

== See also ==
- School (in science and art); School (disambiguation); Science school
- Science studies
- Cognition
- Scientific method
- Center of excellence

== Literature ==
- Polanyi M. Personal Knowledge. The University of Chicago Press, Chicago, 1962 (First published 1958)
- Polanyi M. The Tacit Dimension. New York: Doubleday & Company, inc. Garden city, 1966. 108 p.
- Gruzevich D. Yu. Scientific School as a Form of Activity // Questions of the History of Natural Science and Technology. 2003. No. 1. P. 64–93.
- Rapatsevich E. S. Pedagogy // Large Modern Encyclopedia. Minsk: Sovremennoe Slovo, 2005. P. 667–668.
- Onoprienko V. I. Scientific School as a Sociological Phenomenon // Bulletin of the National Aviation University. Philosophy. Culturology. 2009. Issue 2. P. 33–37.
- Onoprienko V. I. Scientific Schools: Science Studies Context // Science and Science of Science. 2009. No. 4. P. 123–126.
- Onoprienko V. I. Scientific Schools: Problems of Traditions and Innovations // Almanac of Theory and History of Historical Science. Issue 4. Kyiv: IIU. NASU, 2009. P. 138–152.
- Krivotruchenko V. K. Scientific Schools // Znanie. Ponimanie. Umenie|Knowledge. Understanding. Skill. 2011. No. 2 (March — April).
- Ustyuzhanina E. V., Evsyukov S. G., Petrov A. G. et al. Scientific School as a Structural Unit of Scientific Activity. Moscow: Central Economics and Mathematics Institute RAS, 2011. 73 p.
- Schools in Science. Moscow: Nauka, 1977. 523 p. (Science of Science: Problems and Research)
- Vtorov I. P. Dokuchaev school of soil science: Origins and Development // 21st Annual Conference of the IIET RAS. Vol. 2. Moscow: LENAND, 2015. P. 241–245.
- Vtorov I. P., Babenko A. B., Bokova A. I., Davydova Yu. Yu., Potapov M. B. Uvarov A. V., Kuznetsova N. A. The History of N. M. Chernova’s Scientific School of Soil Zoology at the Moscow Pedagogical State University // Chinese Annals of History of Science and Technology. 2025. Vol. 9. No. 2. Pp. 133—160.

== Links ==
- Kupershtokh N. A. Scientific Schools of Russia and Siberia: Problems of Study. Scientific Schools in the Siberian Branch of the RAS.
- Bibliography on Problems of Scientific Schools. Novosibirsk Scientific Center.
