= Conversion electron Mössbauer spectroscopy =

Mössbauer spectroscopy technique

Conversion electron Mössbauer spectroscopy (CEMS) is a Mössbauer spectroscopy technique based on conversion electron.

The CEM spectrum can be obtained either by collecting essentially all the electrons leaving the surface (integral technique), or by selecting the ones in a given energy range by means of a beta ray spectrometer (differential or depth selective CEMS).

This method allows the use of simple and inexpensive detecting equipment, mainly flow-type proportional detectors in which large counting rates can be obtained. This last characteristic makes possible the study of samples with the natural abundance of the Mössbauer isotope. The information furnished by the integral measurements can be increased by using various angles of incidence or by depositing thin layers of inert material on the sample.

== Theory ==
In the energy range used in CEMS, the incident radiation can interact with the absorber through two kinds of processes: (a) conventional interactions – photoelectric and Compton effects, and (b) nuclear resonant absorption – Mössbauer effect. Due to conventional interactions the beam is attenuated and electrons are emitted from the sample. The nuclear de-excitation following the resonant absorption takes place by emission of either a gamma ray or an internal conversion (IC) electron. In the latter case, the atom is left in an ‘excited’ state with a hole in an inner shell; the energy excess is given away with emission of Auger electrons and/or X-rays. Thus, the electrons emitted from the sample as a consequence of the Mössbauer absorptions are: (a) primary (IC or Auger) electrons originated in the de-excitations of the nuclei excited by the incident beam, and (b) secondary electrons originated by conventional interactions of photons (or resonant absorption of gamma rays) emitted after resonant absorptions.
