= European Single Procurement Document =

Electronic self-declaration document

The European Single Procurement Document (ESPD) is an electronic self-declaration document to be submitted by suppliers interested in tendering for contracts for the supply of goods, works or services to public bodies located anywhere within the European Union.

Created under the EU's 2014 Directive on Procurement and implemented, for example, by Regulation 59 of the UK's Public Contracts Regulations 2015, the ESPD is intended to simplify the process of qualification for tendering by permitting businesses to self-declare that they meet the necessary regulatory criteria or commercial capability requirements of the public authority concerned, without needing to submit proof unless subsequently selected as the appointed contractor. The supplier must state that they are able, upon request and without delay, to provide the supporting documents necessary to prove compliance.

The European Commission issued a Commission Implementing Regulation on 5 January 2016 "establishing the standard form for the European Single Procurement Document". Annex 1 of the regulation provides instructions on the use of the ESPD, for example when it can be used, exclusions due to misrepresentation, and what information will be needed. Annex 2 contains a standard format for the form which can be used until the web-based system is online. In Scotland it is a legal requirement to use the ESPD (Scotland) for all procurements with an estimated value of the OJEU threshold and above, commenced on or after 18 April 2016. The ESPD (Scotland) is slightly different from the core EU ESPD, with an additional question relating to compliance with the Employment Relations Act 1999 (Blacklists) Regulations 2010, because this is a mandatory ground for exclusion from a procurement exercise in Scotland.

For England and Wales, the Crown Commercial Service "is currently (January 2016) discussing the most suitable option for ensuring that government's guidance and standard documents on selection are aligned with the ESPD".

The Commission provided a free web service enabling buyers, bidders and other parties to complete an ESPD electronically, until this was withdrawn on 2 May 2019.

A report to the European Parliament and the European Council on the practical application of the ESPD, taking into account the technical development of databases in EU Member States, requested by 18 April 2017, was published on 17 May 2017. According to the report, 22 governments of Member States have started to use the ESPD and 6 (Austria, Belgium, Cyprus, Estonia, Lithuania, and Sweden) indicated that it is not the case, mainly where the Directive had not yet been transposed into national law.
