= Rochester Area Colleges Center for Excellence in Math and Science =

The Rochester Area Colleges Center for Excellence in Math and Science (RAC-CEMS, or RACCEMS) is an association of 19 post-secondary educational institutions located on the Nazareth College campus in Rochester, NY in west-central New York State. The RAC-CEMS focuses on the development and delivery of STEM (Science, Technology, Engineering, and Mathematics) topics in K-16 education and supporting programs designed to increase the quality and quantity of the student talent pool pursuing curricula in math, science and related technical fields.

== About the RAC-CEMS ==
The Rochester Area Colleges is a consortium of higher education institutions in the Rochester, New York metropolitan area. Founded in 1970, Rochester Area Colleges has numerous area public and private colleges as members, and provides collaborative working opportunities for colleges and their students. The purpose of the association is to support the functions of career development, placement, and experiential education in the region. In 2006, Senator Schumer called for Rochester to become a math-science teaching center of excellence and gathered together presidents of Rochester colleges to establish a national math and science teaching center. He also pushed for the Senate Appropriations Committee to approve a grant under the FY07 Labor, Health and Human Services and Education Appropriations Bill for the RAC-CEMS to be funded. In December 2007, the RAC-CEMS was awarded nearly $1,000,000 in federal money to pay for an expansion of teacher-training programs.

== Rochester Area College Consortium ==
The RACCEMS consortium consists of:

- Alfred State College
- Alfred University
- Colgate Rochester Crozer Divinity School
- Corning Community College
- Empire State College
- Finger Lakes Community College
- Hobart and William Smith Colleges
- Keuka College
- Monroe Community College
- Nazareth College
- Roberts Wesleyan College
- Rochester Institute of Technology
- Saint John Fisher College
- St. Bernard's School of Theology and Ministry
- State University of New York College at Brockport
- State University of New York College at Geneseo
- University of Rochester
- Wells College
