= List of Western Governors University people =

This list of Western Governors University people includes notable alumni and honorary-degree recipients affiliated with Western Governors University, a private online university based in Millcreek, Utah, United States.

== Notable alumni ==
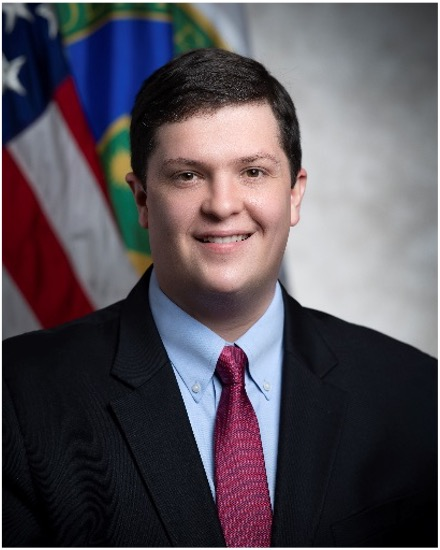
Nick Andersen

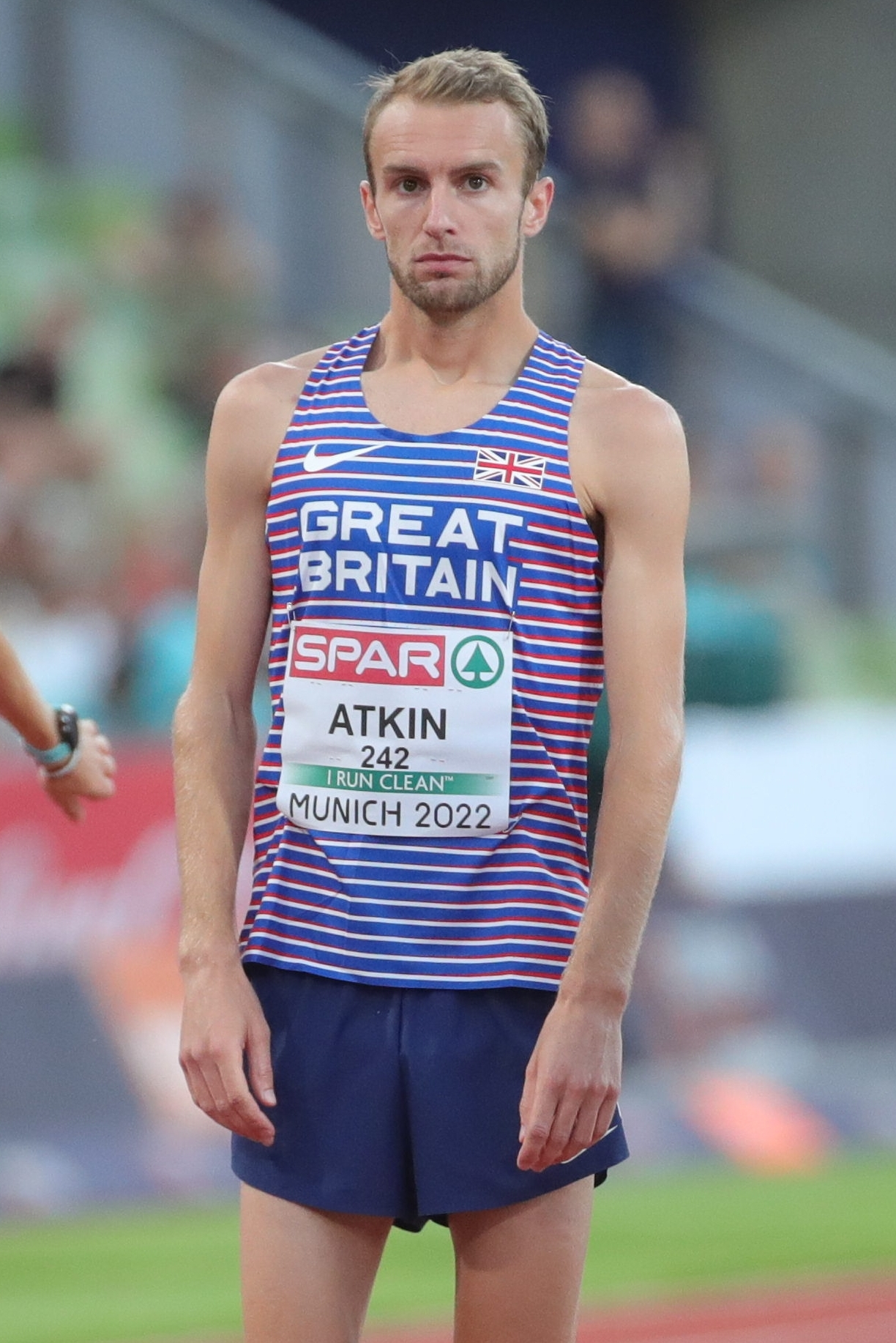
Sam Atkin

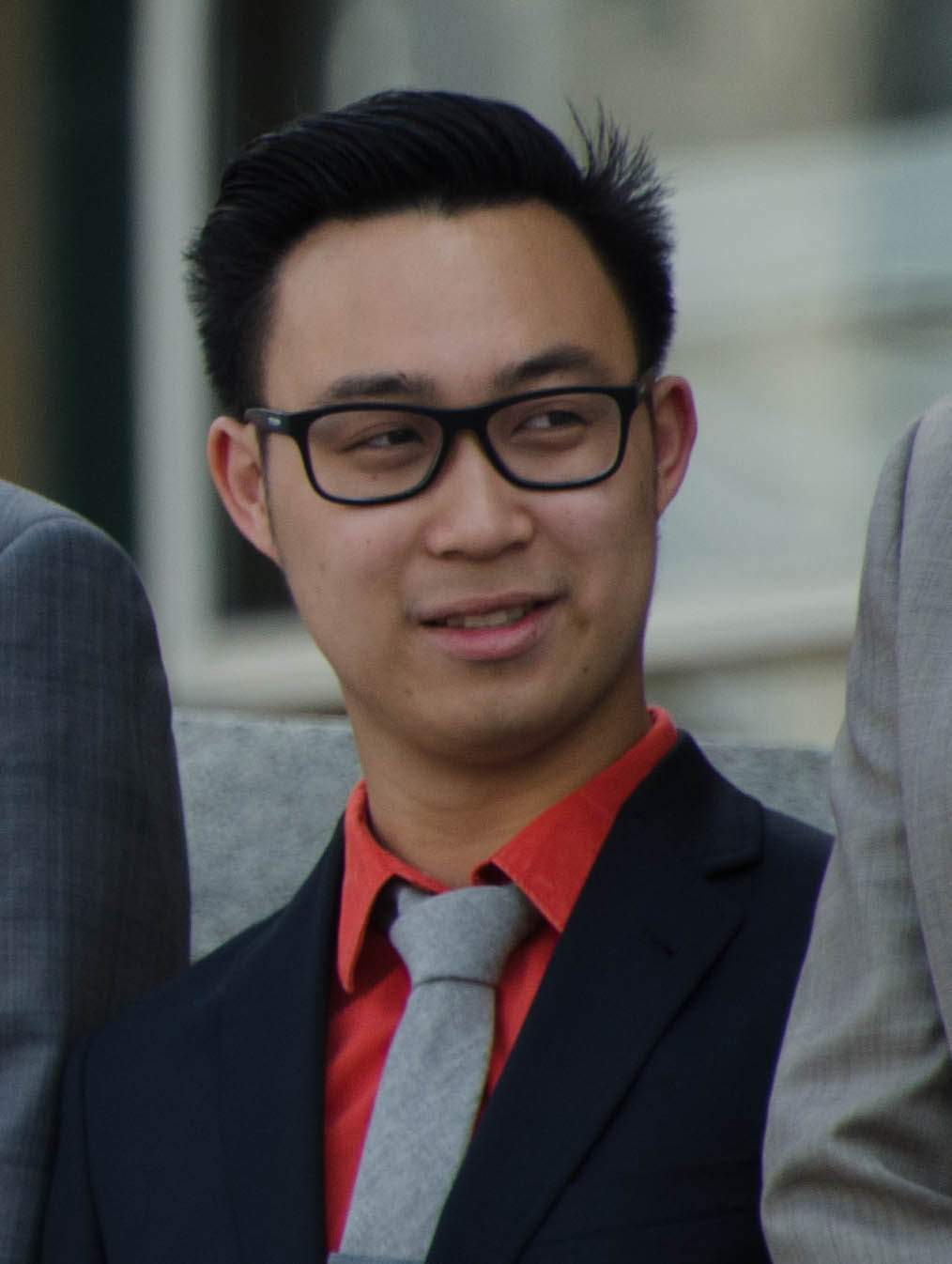
Thomas Dang

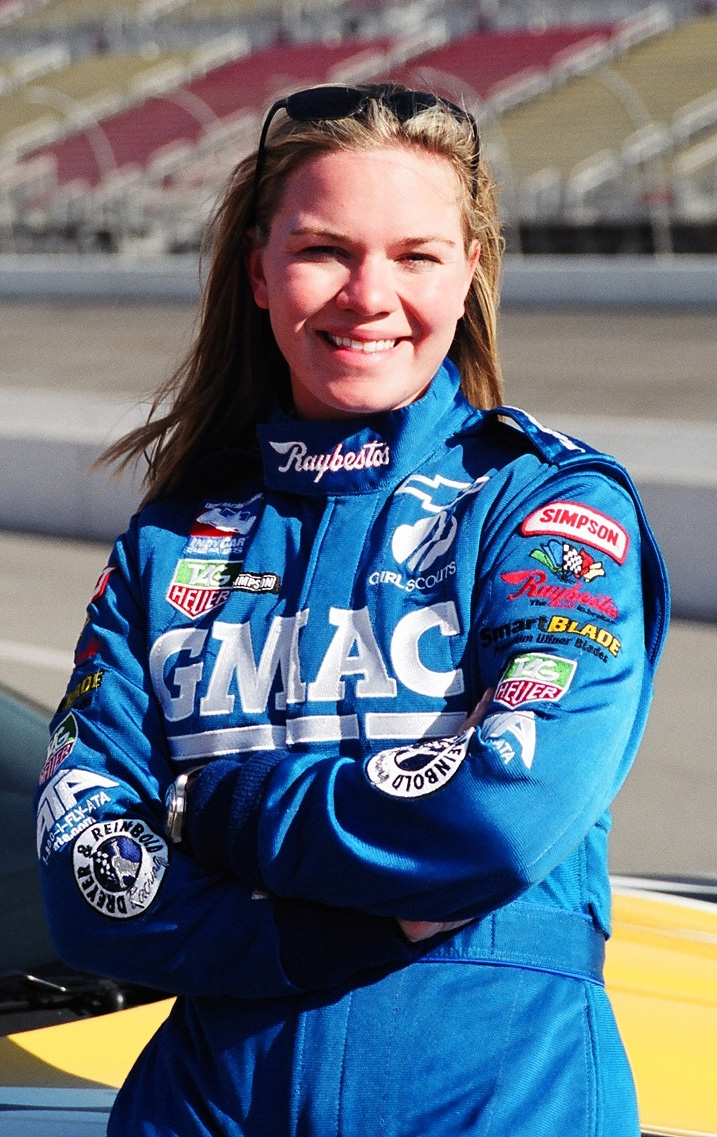
Sarah Fisher

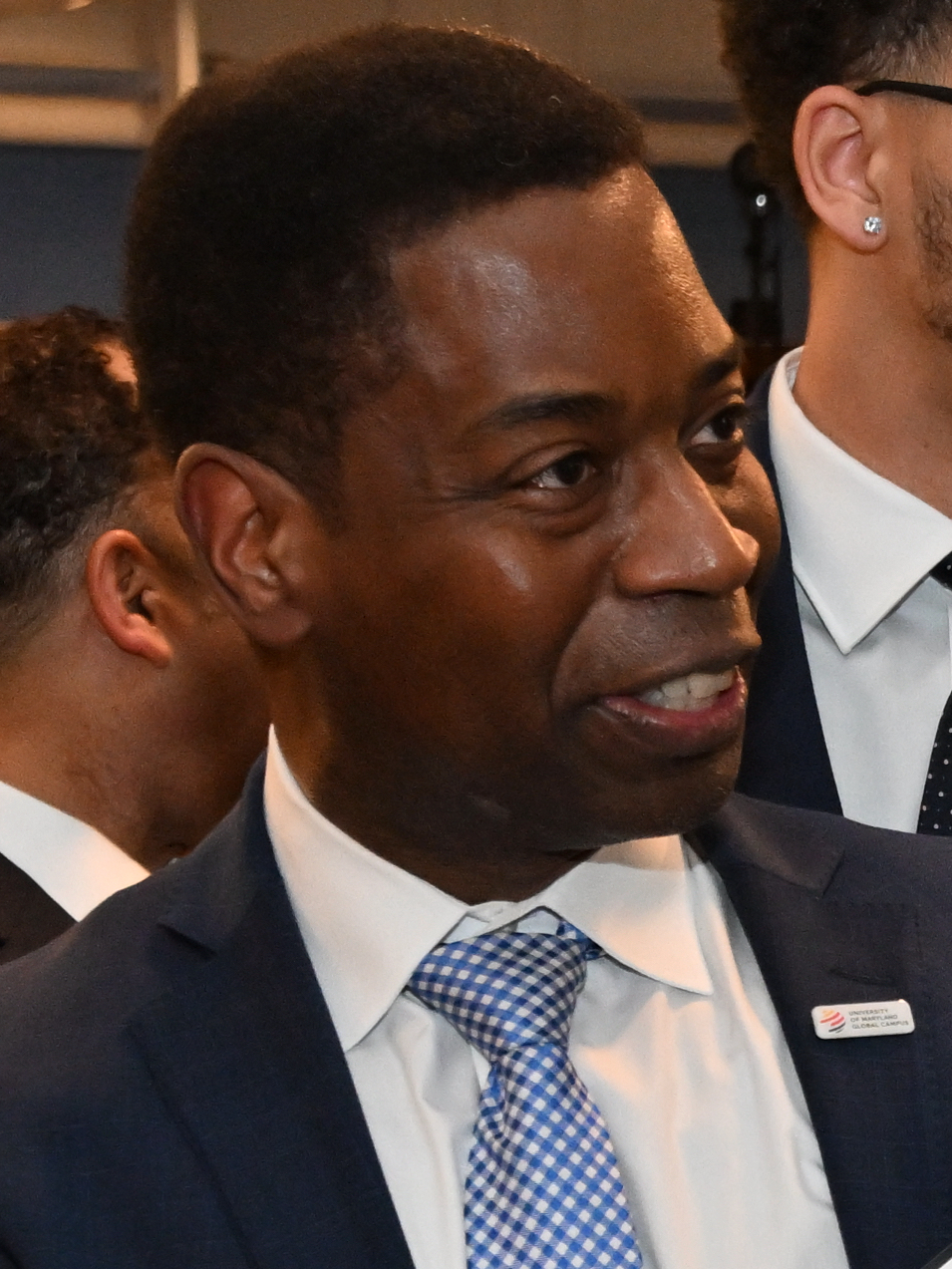
Gregory Fowler

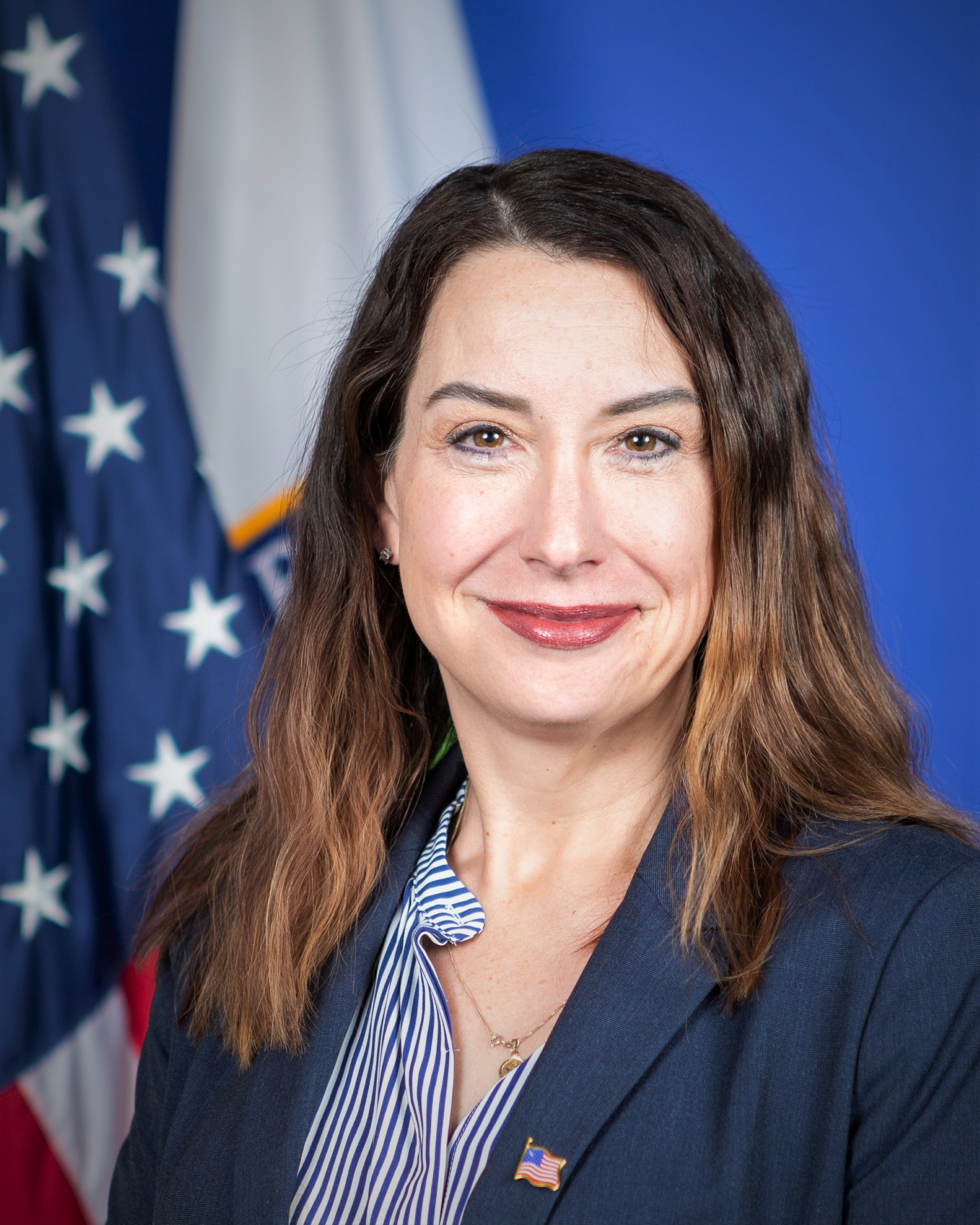
Glenna Gallo

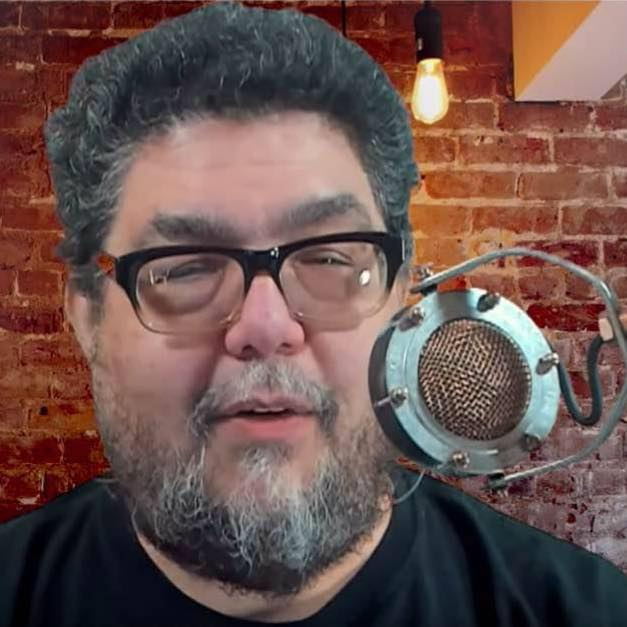
David Gewirtz

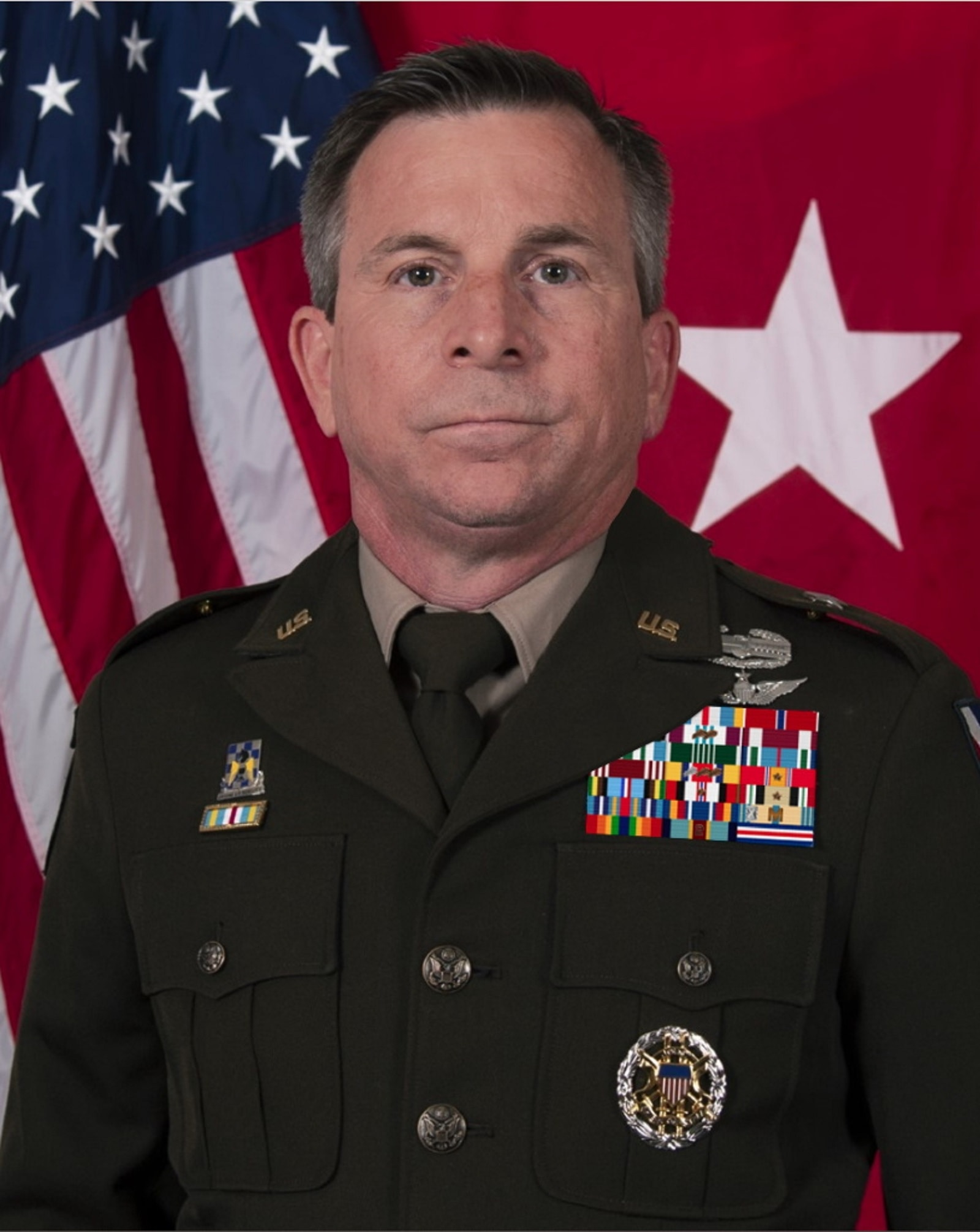
Robert E. Guidry

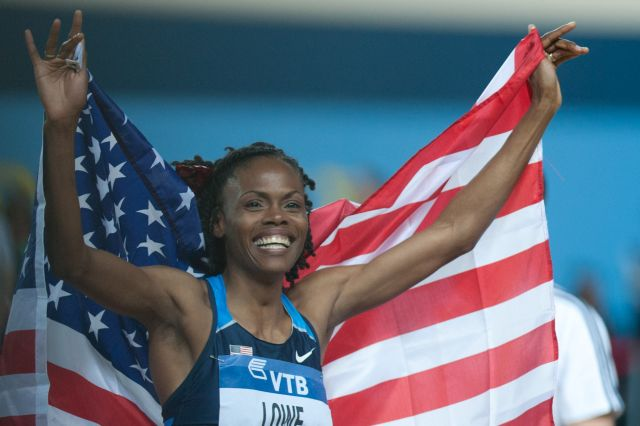
Chaunté Lowe

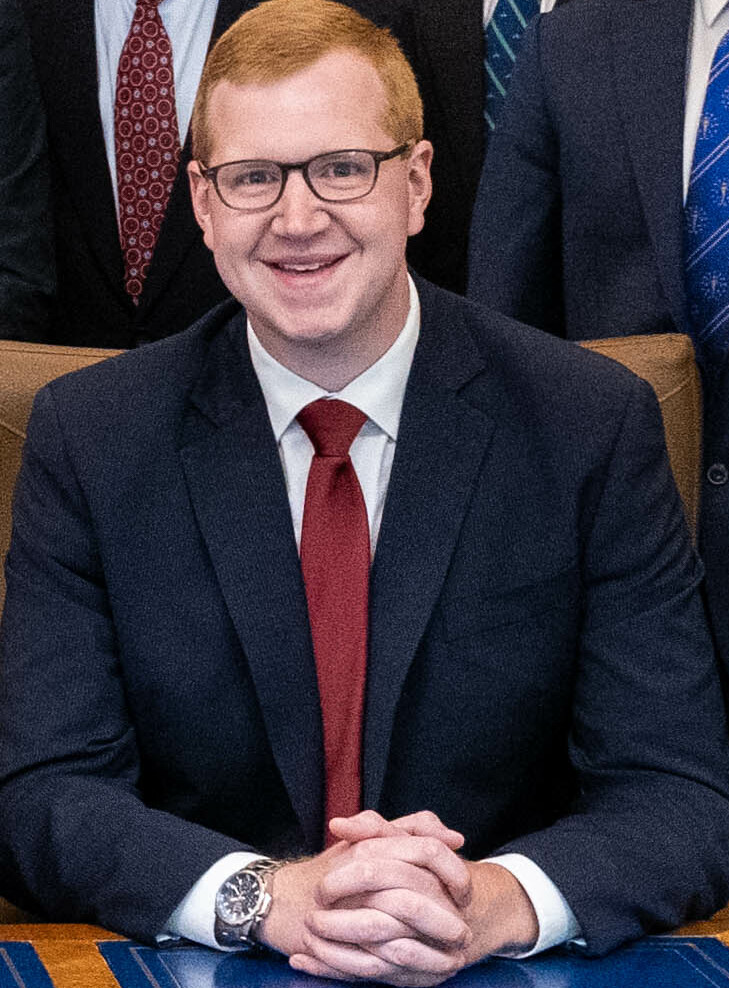
Ethan Manning

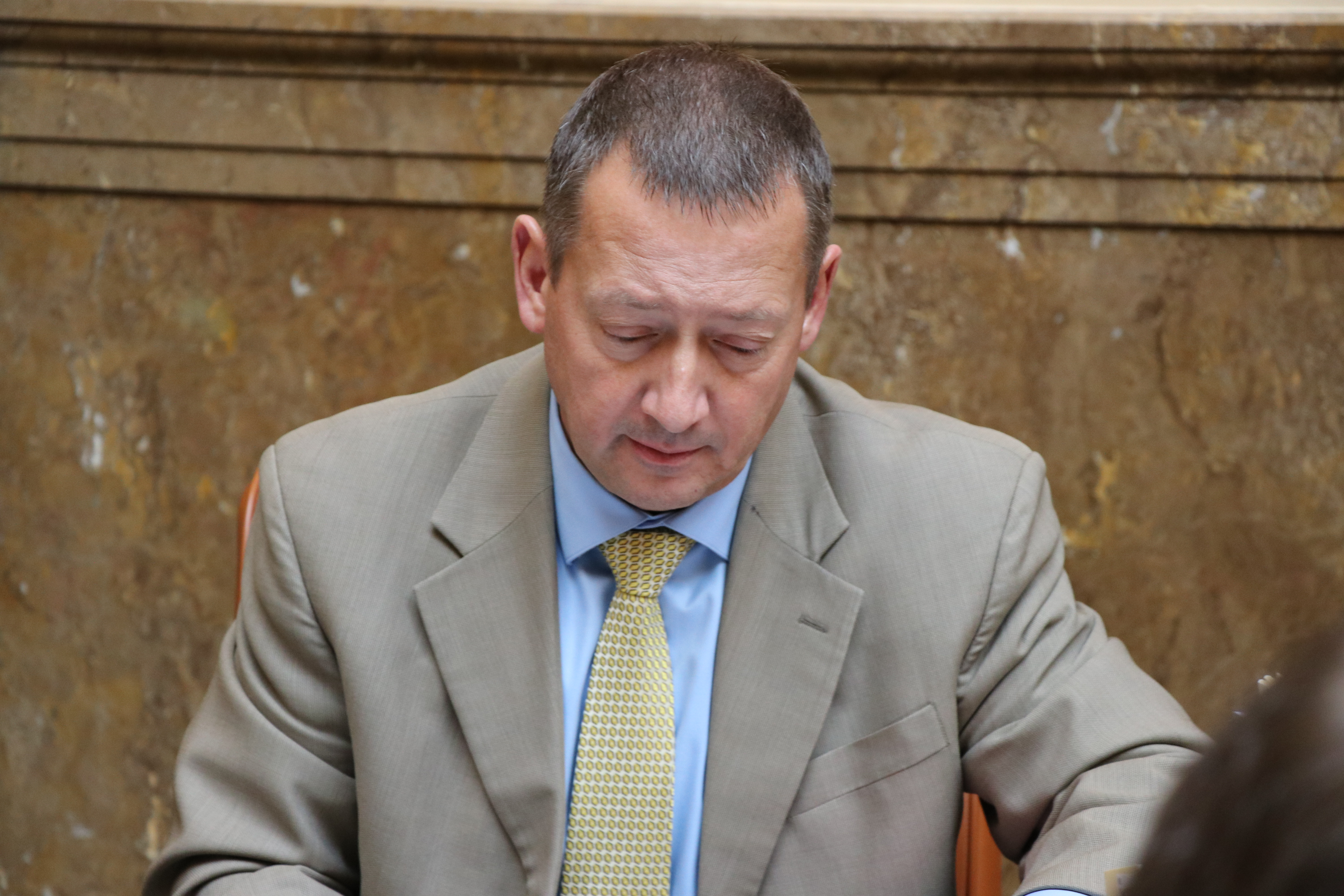
Paul Ray

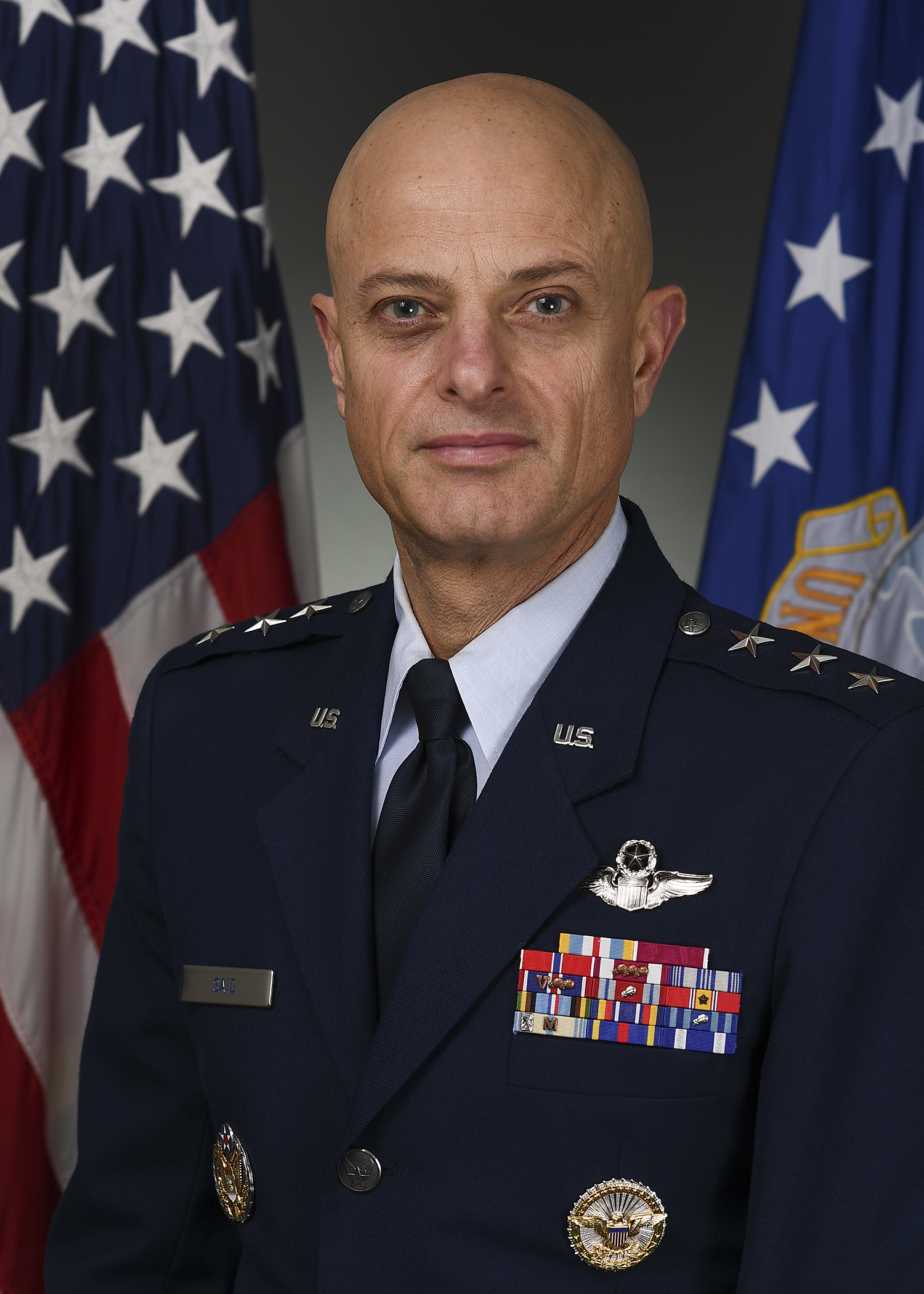
Sami D. Said

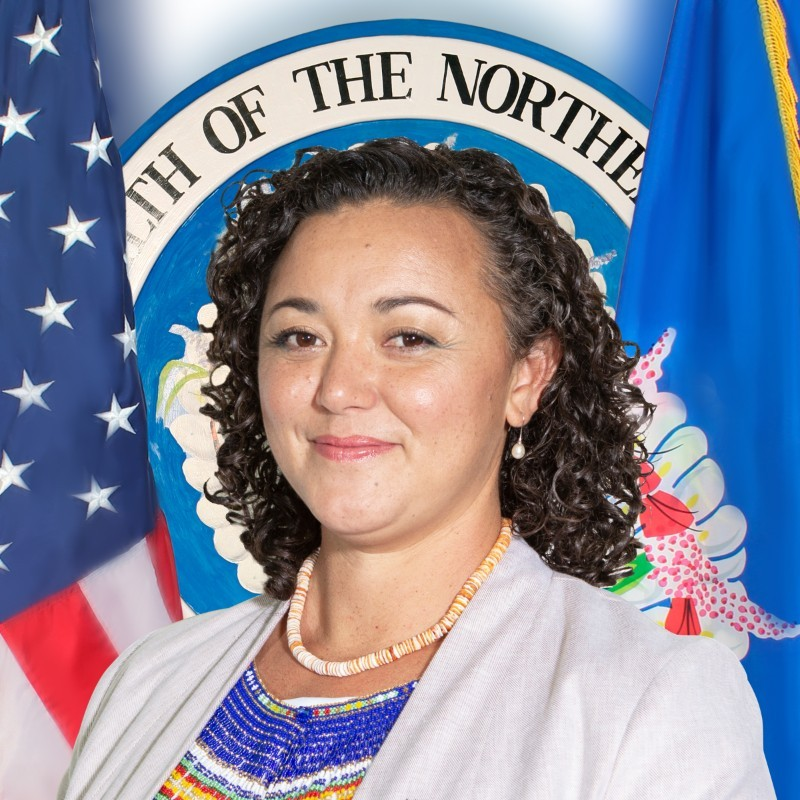
Leila Staffler

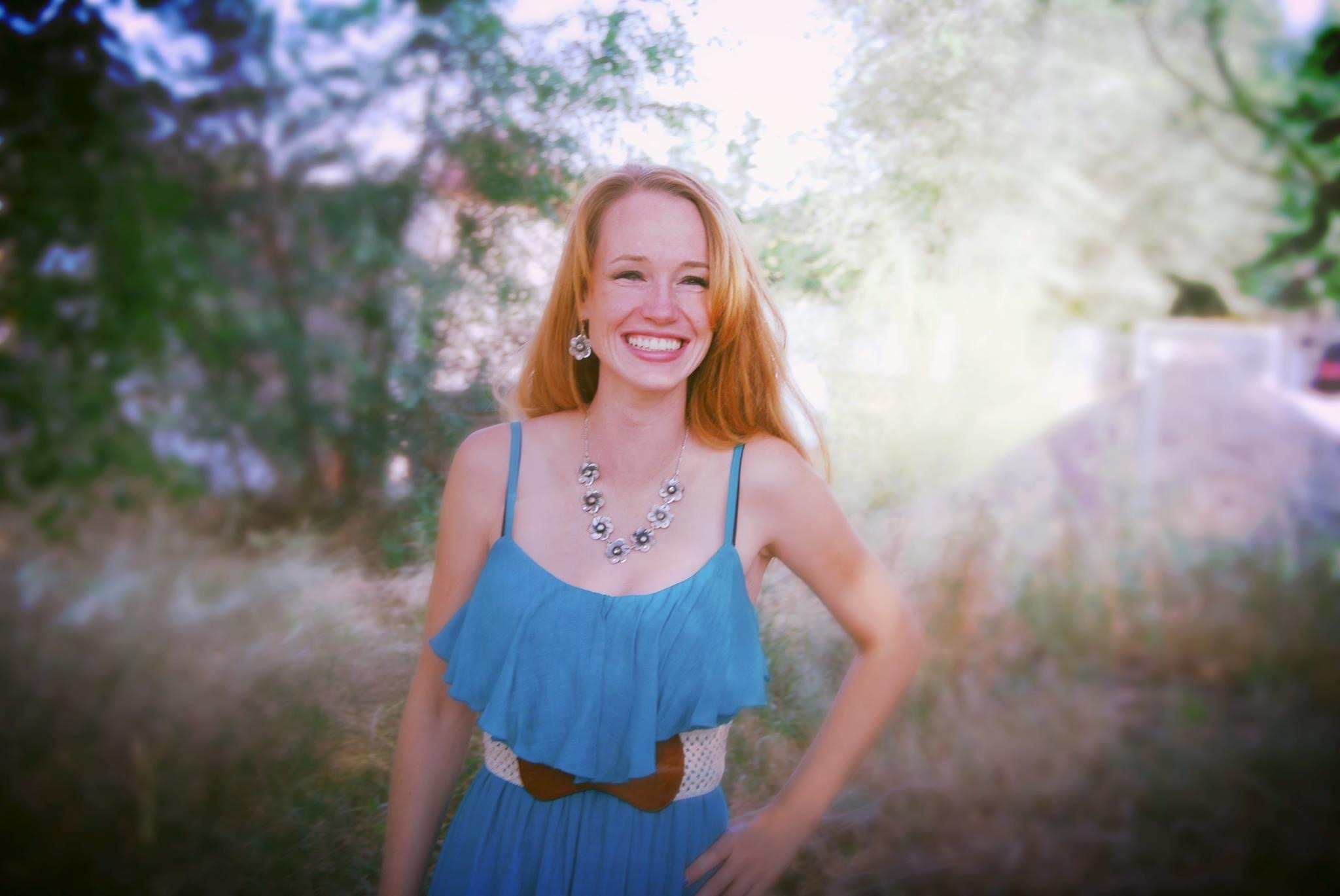
EC Stilson

Alumnus	Notability
Jordan Adams	Former professional basketball player with the WNBA
Nick Andersen	Current assistant secretary of energy, Office of Cybersecurity, Energy Security, and Emergency Response
Sam Atkin	British Olympic athlete specialising in long-distance running
Darby Bailey	Actress, voice-over artist, musician, songwriter, writer/producer, and businesswoman
Andre Barnett	2012 presidential nominee of the Reform Party of the United States
Bill Bell	Member of the West Virginia House of Delegates
Hiram Bertoch	Author; known for An Otter's Guidebook to Being Obnoxiously Happy
Michael Capps	Former member of the Kansas House of Representatives
Angie Carraway	Current member-elect of the Texas House of Representatives
Woody R. Clermont	Current county court judge, Broward County, Florida
Mike Costlow	Current member of the Missouri House of Representatives
Thomas Dang	Former member of the Legislative Assembly of Alberta
Sapan Desai	Owner of the Surgisphere Corporation
Sarah Fisher	Retired professional race-car driver who competed in the Indy Racing League (IRL) and the NASCAR West Series
Gregory Fowler	Current president of University of Maryland Global Campus
Donna Frett-Gregory	Current member of the Legislature of the Virgin Islands
Glenna Gallo	Assistant secretary for the Office of Special Education and Rehabilitative Services, United States Department of Education
David Gewirtz	Journalist, author, and U.S. policy advisor
Robert E. Guidry	Retired brigadier general in the United States Army
Heather Hadwick	Current member of the California State Assembly
Gregg Hale	Former guitar player for the British band Spiritualized
Sandy Ibanez	Current member-elect of the Texas House of Representatives
Domaine Javier	Actress, nurse, and television personality
Dominic Kanaventi	Zimbabwean film and stage actor
Connie Keogh	Current member of the Montana House of Representatives
Timothy Lang Sr.	Current member of the New Hampshire Senate
Ethan Lawson	Current member of the Indiana House of Representatives
Chaunté Lowe	Athlete and four-time Olympian
Ethan Manning	Current member of the Indiana House of Representatives
Artem Markelov	Ice dancer and U.S. junior national champion
Joel McEntire	Former member of the Washington House of Representatives
Tiffiny Mitchell	Former member of the Oregon House of Representatives
Danny Nix Jr.	Current member of the Florida House of Representatives
Julie Reyes Oda	Current member of the Hawaii House of Representatives
Paul Ray	Former member of the Utah House of Representatives
Skyler Rude	Current member of the Washington House of Representatives
Sami D. Said	Retired lieutenant general in the United States Air Force and former inspector general of the Department of the Air Force
Kryss Shane	Social-work educator, consultant, author and public speaker
Bill Sparkman	Former field representative for the United States Census Bureau
Leila Staffler	Current member of the Northern Mariana Islands House of Representatives
EC Stilson	Writer, editor, and publisher
Amy Summers	Current delegate with the West Virginia House of Delegates
Vinny Troia	Ethical hacker and cybersecurity researcher
Mary-Margaret Wilson	Current chief medical officer of UnitedHealth Group
Mai Xiong	Current member of the Michigan House of Representatives

== Honorary-degree recipients, since 2002 ==
Recipient	Year/degree
Bob Bennett	2002 honorary doctorate
Éric Benhamou	2002 honorary doctorate
Jim Geringer	2002 honorary doctorate
Eric Schmidt	2002 honorary doctorate
Mike Leavitt	2003 honorary degree
Rod Paige	2005 honorary doctorate
Roy Romer	2006 honorary degree
Michael Enzi	2007 honorary degree
Dr. Clara Lovett	2008 honorary degree
Scott McNealy	2009 honorary degree
Jamie Merisotis	2011 honorary degree
Robert Mendenhall	2017 honorary degree

== See also ==
- Education in the United States
