= Sandy Ibanez =

American politician

Member-elect of the Texas House of Representatives from the 28th district
- Assuming office January 2027
- Succeeding: Gary Gates

Personal details
- Party: Democratic

Sandy Ibanez, also known as Sandy Ibáñez, is an American politician. She is the Democratic member-elect of the Texas House of Representatives from the 28th district.

Ibanez graduated from George Bush High School in Richmond, Texas. She later studied at the University of Houston, where she obtained a Bachelor of Business Administration degree, and Western Governors University, where she obtained a Master of Business Administration degree.

Ibanez worked in the fintech industry, including as an executive. She also teaches elementary school at Fort Bend Independent School District, and is a real estate professional employed by Evermark Commercial Group.

Ibanez ran in the 2026 Texas House of Representatives election in the 28th district, which primarily corresponds with the western half of Fort Bend County; her Republican incumbent Gary Gates was running for a fourth term. She cited the state government's negative effects on schools and families as her reason for running, and named affordability, education, and healthcare among her legislative priorities. She won the Democratic primary in March 2026, defeating Kristyna Loundy 53% to 47%.

Ibanez won the general election in November 2026, defeating Gates 51% to 49%; this was a massive shift from Gates' previous victory in 2024 at 61%.

Ibanez lives in Fort Bend County. She is Tejana, and is a fluent speaker of Spanish.
