= Heeger =

Heeger is a surname. Notable people with the surname include:

- Alan J. Heeger (born 1936), American physicist
- Ash Heeger (born 1989), South African chef
- David Heeger (born 1961), American neuroscientist
- Ernst Heeger (1783–1866), Austrian amateur entomologist
- Gerald Heeger (born 1942), American academic and college administrator

== See also ==
- Heeter
