= Hexter =

Hexter is a surname. Notable people with the surname include:

- J. H. Hexter (1910–1996), American historian
- Ralph Hexter (born 1952), American academic administrator

== See also ==
- Dexter (name)
- Heeter
