= Scott Pulsipher =

President, Western Governors University

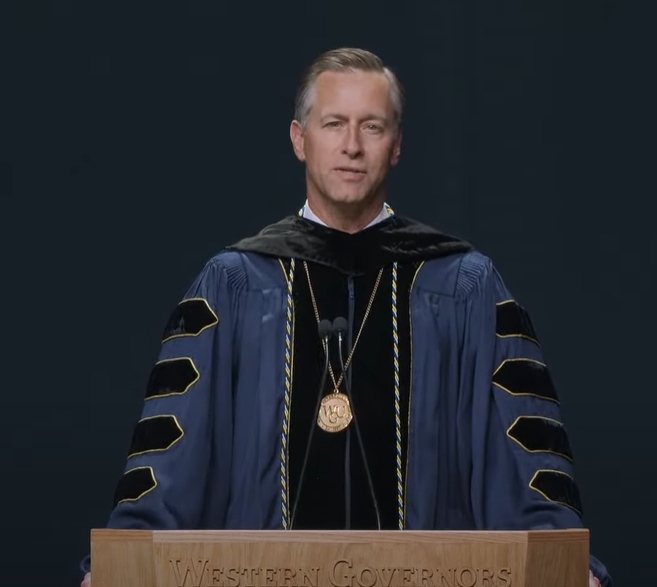
- Scott Pulsipher addresses WGU graduates.
- Born: Scott D. Pulsipher
- Education: Brigham Young University
- Occupations: University President; board member; Writer
- Years active: 2016–present
- Known for: President of Western Governors University
- Title: President of Western Governors University
- Website: www.wgu.edu/about/governance/president.html

Scott D. Pulsipher is the president of Western Governors University, the largest nonprofit university by total enrollment in the United States. He was appointed to this position in April 2016.

== Education ==
Pulsipher earned a bachelor's degree in management with a finance emphasis from Brigham Young University. He later obtained a Master of Business Administration (MBA) from Harvard Business School.

== Career ==
=== Yantra ===
After completing his bachelor's degree, and not long after business school, Pulsipher joined Yantra, a supply software company, as a VP of product management and marketing. Yantra was later acquired by Sterling Commerce (now owned by IBM), and Pulsipher remained with the company. During his tenure, revenue climbed $600 million and annual employee turnover declined from around 18 percent to under 2 percent.

=== Amazon and Needle Inc. ===
In 2009, Pulsipher left Sterling Commerce, and joined Amazon as general manager of the Amazon Webstore. While there, he helped launch Amazon's website in the U.S., U.K., and Germany. He moved onto Needle Inc. in 2013 and then to Western Governors University.

== President of Western Governors University ==
Western Governors University (WGU) is a nonprofit online, competency-based institution that allows students to move through academic programs at their own pace, and focuses on necessary career skills. In 2018, 72% of WGU graduates reported that their education was worth the cost; and in 2021, this rose to 77 percent, compared to only 37 percent nationally. In 2021, over 150,000 students enrolled in WGU. The university graduates between 45,000 and 50,000 students a year.

As the president of Western Governors University, Pulsipher has overseen significant growth and expansion of the nonprofit university. During his tenure, has overseen a plan called 10x Vision, created to scale enrollment and launch new ventures to expand access to higher education.

== Community engagement ==
In addition to his work as an educator and administrator, Scott Pulsipher has been involved in various volunteering and community service initiatives. He served on the board of trustees for the Utah Technology Council (now Silicon Slopes Commons) from 2016 to 2019, where he helped to foster support for Utah's technology ecosystem. He also served as Tech Chair and board member of the Marriott School of Marketing's advisory board at Brigham Young University from January 2010 to April 2016.

In 2019, he was named to the White House workforce-policy advisory board, a 25-member advisory board, along with Tim Cook, CEO of Apple Inc., Ginny Rometty, CEO of IBM, and other business leaders, governors, and education and labor officials.

In 2020, he was named to the National Task Force on Transfer of Credit.

Pulsipher chairs the Presidents Forum, which is a network of college and university presidents committed to the reinvention of higher education. He is also a member of the Handshake's Impact Advisory Board, trustee for the Committee for Economic Development, and on the board of the American Council on Education.

== Education policy ==
Pulsipher has spoken at different conferences and events about changes that colleges, policy makers, and employers should make to help more people find employment or advance in their careers. He regularly speaks on podcasts, including Work In Progress, MarketScale, HEDx, The Disruptive Voice, The Rant, Harvard Business School, The University Innovation Alliance, and the EdUp Experience.

Pulsipher has also come before Congress to testify on the state of education and needed changes. This includes testifying before the House Committee on Education and the Workforce about the importance of a high return on investment for a college education. WGU partly measures programs’ ROI by reviewing graduates’ median pay increase two years after graduation, the cost of each program, and how many years a student has until they reach retirement age.

== Awards ==
In 2020, EdTech Digest named Pulsipher one of the Top 100 Influencers in EdTech.
