= EC Stilson =

American writer

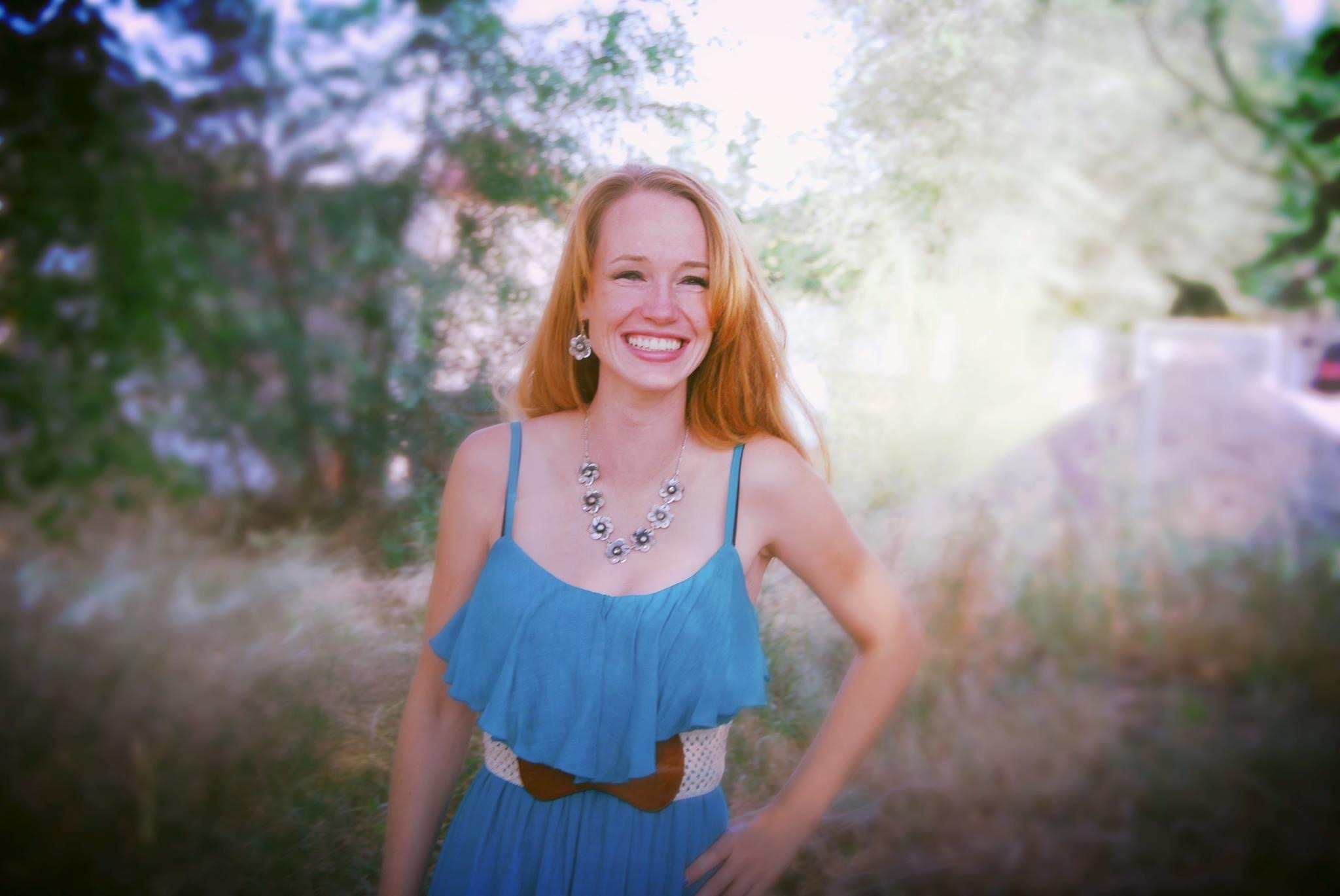
- Stilson in 2014
- Born: Elisa Stilson; February 2, 1983 (age 43); Price, Utah
- Occupations: Novelist; editor, publisher
- Spouse: Cade Hirsch Morris (divorced) Michael Magagna (m. 2015)
- Children: 4
- Parent(s): Phil Stilson, Ruby Stilson

Elisa Stilson Magagna (born February 2, 1983), known by the pen name EC Stilson, is an American writer, editor, and publisher. She has also published blog posts under the name Elisabeth Hirsch, the surname of her first husband. She is one of the founders of Wayman Publishing and Literati Publications. Stilson is also known for her memoirs, and personal appearances speaking across the United States.

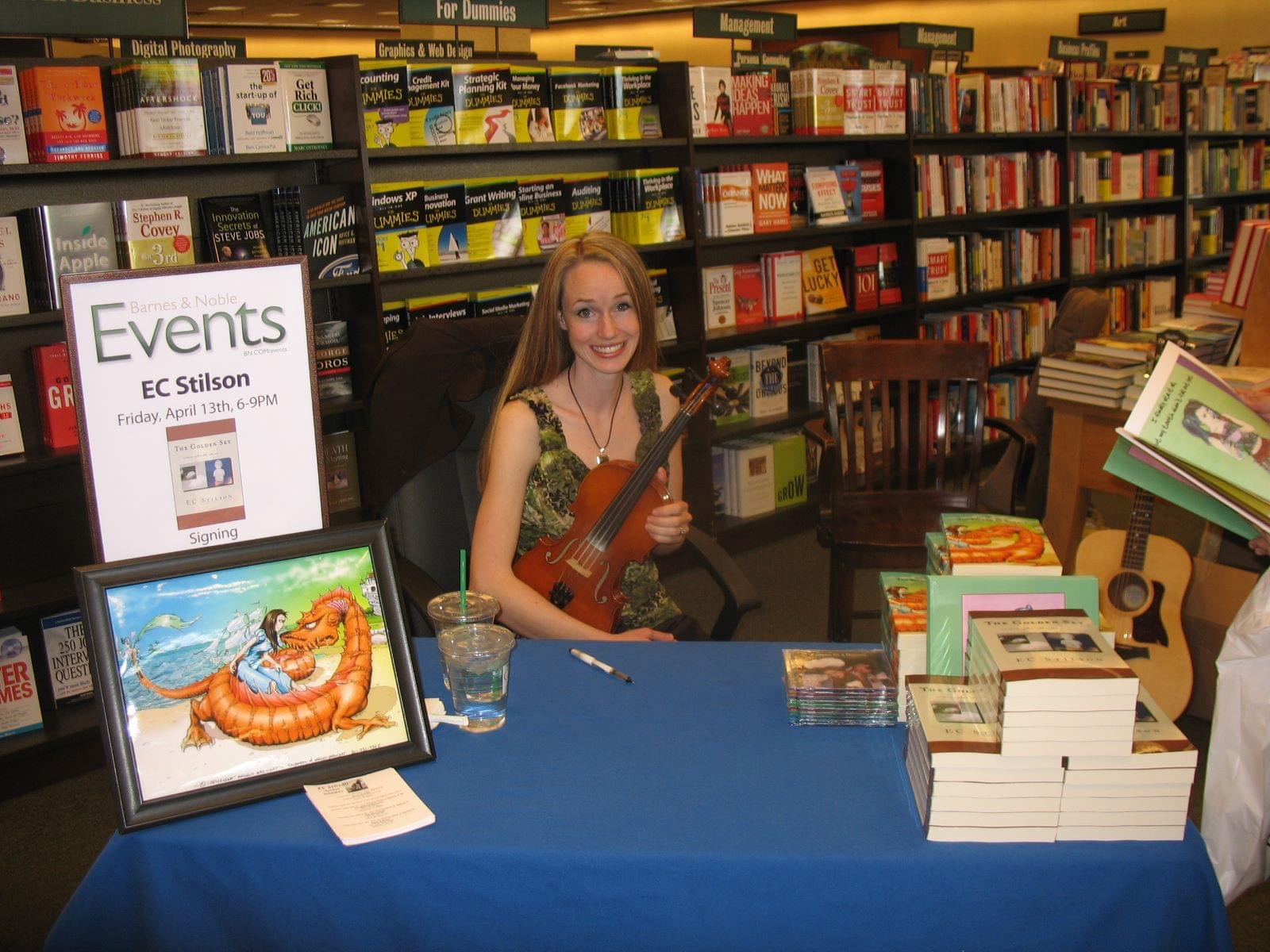

== Biography ==
Stilson attended Brighton High School. After graduating from high school two trimesters early, Stilson traveled to Hawaii and became a homeless violinist with guitar player Cade Hirsch Morris. Months later they returned to Utah, married, and had children. In 2001, her father was diagnosed with colon cancer. In 2003, her second child, a boy, died of birth defects after living 2½ months, and her marriage started failing. It was during 2001–2003 that Stilson wrote her first memoir, The Golden Sky.

In 2005, in an effort to cope with stressful situations, Stilson went back to school and received her associate degree from Western International University. In the following decade, Stilson wrote seven more novels under the pen name EC Stilson and also earned her bachelor's degree from Western Governors University.

In 2015, Stilson married Michael Magagna, former host of Utah After Hours (KWCR). The two moved to Idaho, where Stilson was diagnosed with melanoma stage 2B in 2018. In 2020, this progressed to stage 4, and Stilson was expected to live only two years.

While suffering from cancer, Stilson began blogging again; her blog, "Crazy Life of a Writing Mom," had one million views. She and her family began checking things off her bucket list together, including skydiving, visiting Italy, and even singing the "Star-Spangled Banner" at a semi-pro baseball game. She wrote two memoirs about her melanoma: Two More Years and Ring the Bell.

== Business ==
In 2011, Stilson started a blog called Crazy Life of a Writing Mom, which would be categorized under Mommyblogs. The blog was initially published under the pen name Elisabeth Hirsch, with her stated goal to "write one hilarious, embarrassing, or otherwise outrageous moment each day for 365 days straight."

In 2011, Stilson founded Wayman Publishing. Five of its books became Amazon bestsellers in 2012, many of them in large categories such as women's memoir. Wayman Publishing went out of business in the fall of 2014.

From 2011 to 2013, several of Stilson's books were published, including The Sword of Senack, How to Lose a Tooth, and three memoirs in The Golden Sky series.

== Bibliography ==
- (2011) How to Lose a Tooth, CreateSpace Independent Publishing Platform, ISBN 1466473185
- (2011) One Wing in the Fire (The Golden Sky), Wayman Publishing, Independently published, Literati Publications, ISBN 1460961978
- (2012) The Sword of Senack, Wayman Publishing, ISBN 1461180694
- (2012) Bible Girl & the Bad Boy, Wayman Publishing, ISBN 1463653654
- (2012) The Best of ECWrites (Crazy Life of a Writing Mom, Book 1), Kindle Edition, Wayman Publishing, ASIN:B008AK75X2
- (2012) Homeless in Hawaii, CreateSpace Independent Publishing, ASIN:B00F3ZMZGO
- (2013) How to Avoid Having Sex, Wayman Publishing/CreateSpace Independent Publishing Platform, ISBN 1482095262
- (2017) A Stranger's Kindness, Literati Publications/CreateSpace Independent Publishing Platform, ISBN 1622537815
- (2022) Two More Years, Evolved Publishing ISBN 1622537815
- (2023) Ring the Bell, Independently published, Literati Publishing ISBN 9798854651738

=== Additional publication credits ===
- (2011) Christmas Lites I, CreateSpace Independent Publishing Platform, ISBN 146796204X
- (2012) Christmas Lites II, CreateSpace Independent Publishing Platform, ISBN 1480275042
- (2012) Open Doors: An Anthology, Wayman Publishing, CreateSpace Independent Publishing Platform, ISBN 1477455132
- (2012) Open Doors: Fractured Fairy Tales, Wayman Publishing, CreateSpace Independent Publishing Platform, ISBN 148015718X
- (2012) My Funny Major Medical, Bauu Institute ISBN 1936955105

=== Podcast ===
- Tips to Happiness with EC Stilson, October 2, 2023 – Present, Global One Media Inc.
