= Gregory Fowler =

American academic administrator

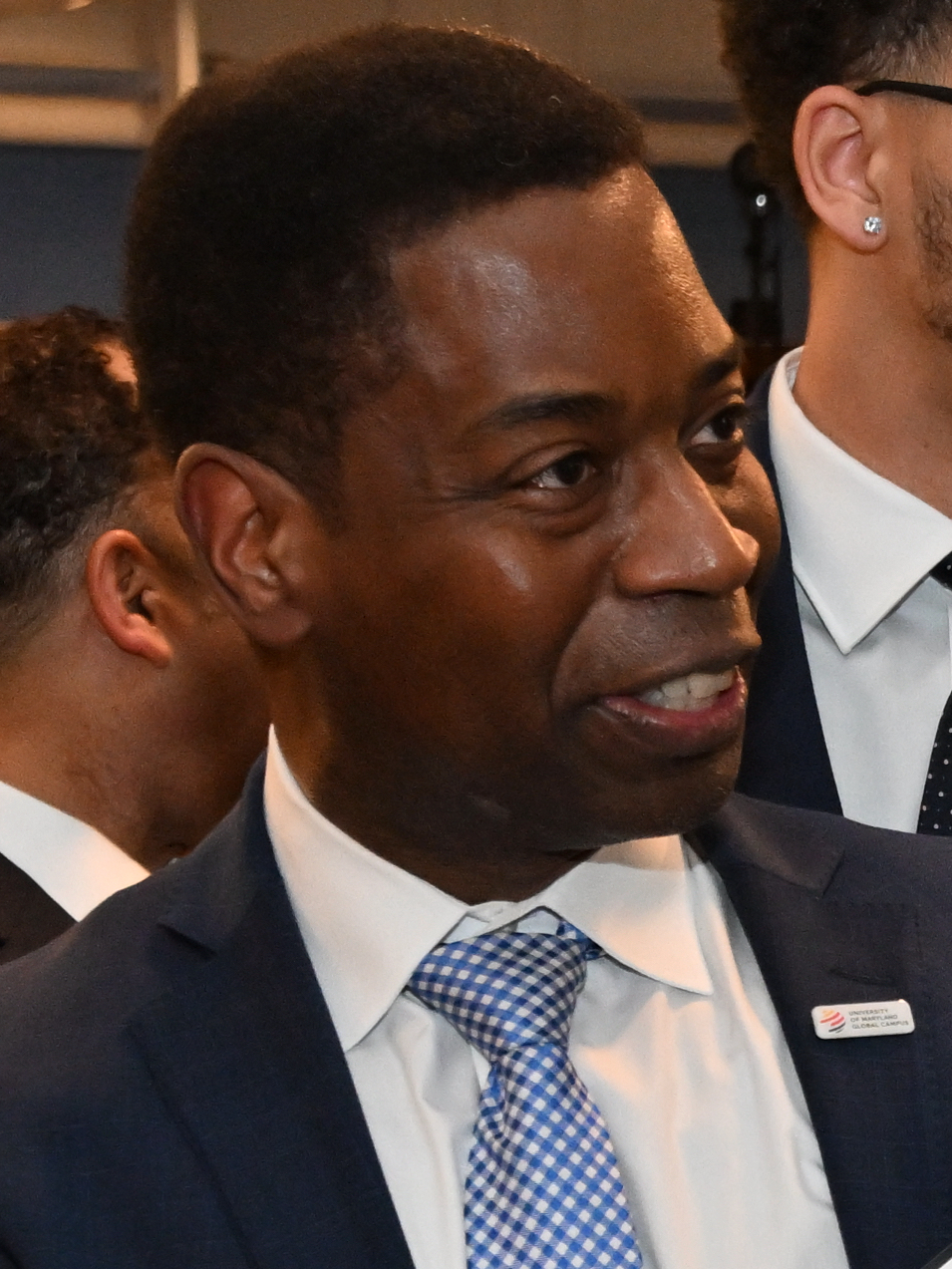

6th President of University of Maryland Global Campus
- Incumbent
- Assumed office January 4, 2021
- Preceded by: Javier Miyares

President of the Southern New Hampshire University Global Campus
- In office September 2018 – January 4, 2021

Personal details
- Education: Morehouse College (BA); George Mason University (MA); University at Buffalo (PhD); Western Governors University (MBA)
- Occupation: Academic administrator

Gregory W. Fowler is an American academic administrator serving as president of the University of Maryland Global Campus. He was previously president of Southern New Hampshire University's Global Campus.

== Early life and education ==
Fowler was raised in Albany, Georgia, with seven siblings. His mother was a secondary schoolteacher, and several other family members were ministers. After graduating from Morehouse College, Fowler was an outreach specialist and media affairs specialist at the National Endowment for the Humanities for four years. During this time, he completed a master's degree in English at George Mason University. He worked as a lecturer and assistant professor of literature and American studies at Penn State Erie, The Behrend College, while earning a Ph.D. in English and American studies, completing his dissertation on Mark Twain and Generation X at the University at Buffalo. Fowler also completed a Master of Business Administration at Western Governors University in Utah and higher education and executive leadership programs at Harvard University. He was a Charles A. Dana Scholar at Duke University and received two Fulbright awards: in 2002 to Berlin, Germany, and in 2006 to Belgium and Germany.

== Career ==
Fowler was associate provost and dean of liberal arts at Western Governors University. He served as chief academic officer and vice president for academic affairs at Hesser College in New Hampshire. For nine years, Fowler worked at Southern New Hampshire University in different roles, including chief academic officer and vice president of academic affairs. He was promoted to president of its global campus in September 2018. On January 4, 2021, Fowler succeeded Javier Miyares as president of the University of Maryland Global Campus. He is the institution's first non-interim African American president.
