= Sami D. Said =

Lieutenant general in the United States Air Force

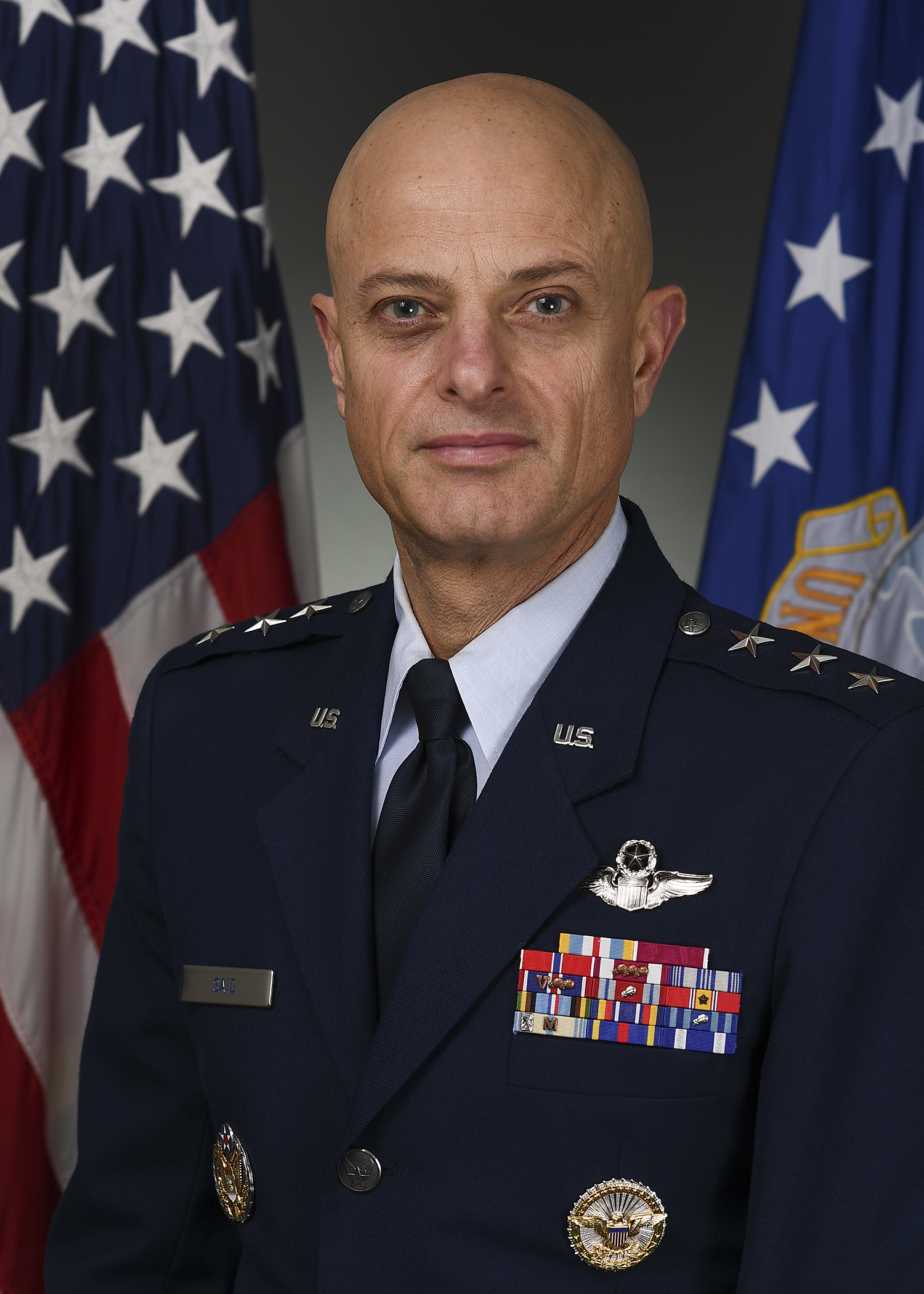
- Born: 1964 (age 61–62)
- Military career
- Allegiance: United States
- Branch: United States Air Force
- Service years: 1991–2022
- Rank: Lieutenant General
- Commands: 144th Fighter Wing; 125th Aircraft Maintenance Squadron
- Conflicts: War in Afghanistan
- Awards: Air Force Distinguished Service Medal; Defense Superior Service Medal (2); Legion of Merit; Bronze Star Medal

Sami Dia Said (born 1964) is a retired lieutenant general in the United States Air Force, who last served as the Inspector General of the Air Force. In this capacity, he reports to the Secretary of the Air Force, Chief of Staff of the Air Force, and Chief of Space Operations on matters concerning Department of the Air Force readiness, efficiency and the military discipline of active duty, Air Force Reserve and Air National Guard forces. He also provides inspection policy and oversees the inspection and evaluation system for all Department of the Air Force nuclear and conventional forces; oversees Department of the Air Force counterintelligence operations; investigates fraud, waste and abuse; oversees criminal investigations; and provides oversight of complaints resolution programs. Said is responsible for three field operating agencies: the Air Force Inspection Agency, the Office of Special Investigations, and the Department of Defense Cyber Crime Center.

Said is a command pilot with more than 2,200 hours in both the F-15 Eagle and the F-16 Fighting Falcon. Said's combat flying experience includes operations Northern Watch and Southern Watch. Said has commanded at the wing and squadron level. His staff and joint experience include assignments at Headquarters United States Air Force; the Office of the Secretary of Defense; Headquarters, International Security Assistance Force, Kabul, Afghanistan; Department of State, Washington, D.C. and U.S. Embassy, Kabul, Afghanistan. Prior to this assignment, Said was the Deputy Inspector General of the Air Force, Office of the Secretary of the Air Force, Arlington, Virginia.

Said is a 1986 graduate of the University of Alabama at Birmingham. Said also received his Master of Business Administration from the Western Governors University.

As Air Force Inspector General, Lieutenant General Sami Said determined that the military’s domestic use of reconnaissance aircraft (RC-26 planes) during the summer 2020 protests was legal and not aimed at protestors.

Said did not prosecute anyone for the U.S. military’s August 2021 drone strike in Kabul, Afghanistan, that killed 10 civilians, including an aid worker and his children.

== Retirement ==
Sami Said joined Raytheon Technologies’ Intelligence & Space business as vice president of global security in April 2022.

== Awards and decorations ==
US Air Force Command Pilot Badge
Office of the Secretary of Defense Identification Badge
Headquarters Air Force Badge

Defense Superior Service Medal with one bronze oak leaf cluster
Legion of Merit
Bronze Star Medal
Meritorious Service Medal with three oak leaf clusters
Air Force Achievement Medal
Air Force Outstanding Unit Award with "V" device and two oak leaf clusters
Superior Honor Award
Combat Readiness Medal with silver oak leaf cluster
National Defense Service Medal with one bronze service star
Armed Forces Expeditionary Medal
Global War on Terrorism Service Medal
Air Force Longevity Service Award with silver and two bronze oak leaf clusters
Armed Forces Reserve Medal with silver Hourglass device and "M" device
Air Force Training Ribbon
NATO Medal for service with ISAF

== Effective dates of promotions ==
Rank	Date
Second Lieutenant	February 14, 1991
First Lieutenant	February 28, 1993
Captain	May 20, 1995
Major	May 29, 1999
Lieutenant Colonel	May 29, 2003
Colonel	June 27, 2008
Brigadier General	January 4, 2013
Major General	March 27, 2015
Lieutenant General	January 31, 2019

Military offices
Preceded by Craig N. Gourley	Deputy Inspector General of the Department of the Air Force; 2015–2019	Succeeded by Jeff Hurlbert
Preceded by Stayce D. Harris	Inspector General of the Department of the Air Force; 2019–2022	Succeeded by Stephen L. Davis
