= David Gewirtz =

American computer scientist

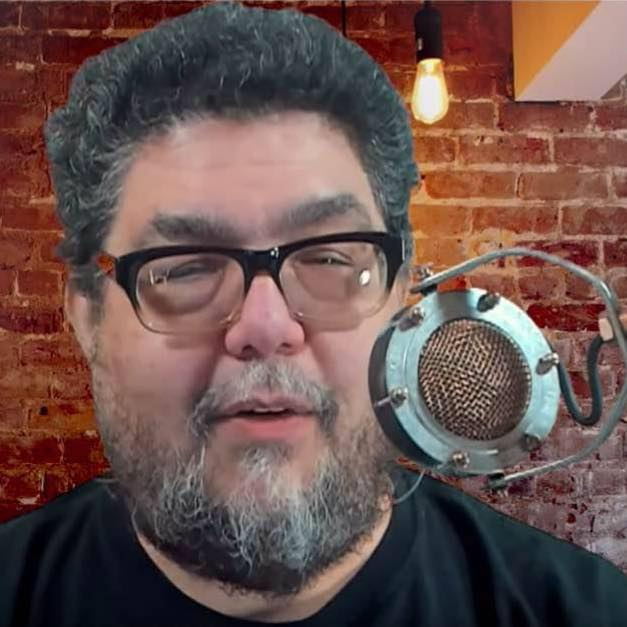
- Occupations: Journalist, Computer Scientist, Author, U.S. Policy Advisor
- Spouse: Denise Amrich
- Writing career
- Genres: Technology, Competitiveness, Politics, National Security
- Notable works: How To Save Jobs, Where Have All The E-mails Gone?, The Flexible Enterprise
- Notable awards: Sigma Xi Research Award
- Website: www.davidgewirtz.com

David Allen Gewirtz is a journalist, author, and U.S. policy advisor working in technology and national security policy. He currently serves as director of the U.S. Strategic Perspective Institute.

Gewirtz is a CNN contributor, a CBS contributing editor, and the ZDNet Government blogger. He is best known for his non-partisan investigative reporting on the Bush White House e-mail controversy, and the author of the book Where Have All The E-mails Gone? How Something as Seemingly Benign as White House E-mail Can Have Freaky National Security Consequences which explores the controversy from a technical perspective and, according to The Intelligence Daily, is "the definitive account about the circumstances that led to the loss of administration emails."

Gewirtz is the cyberwarfare advisor for the International Association for Counterterrorism & Security Professionals, a columnist for The Journal of Counterterrorism and Homeland Security, and has been a guest commentator for the Nieman Watchdog of the Nieman Foundation for Journalism at Harvard University. He is also a member of the FBI InfraGard program and is a member of the U.S. Naval Institute.

Gewirtz has been awarded the Sigma Xi Research Award in Engineering. He is the author of five books including How To Save Jobs and Where Have All The E-mails Gone?. He is also a former professor of computer science and has lectured at Princeton University, the University of California, Berkeley, UCLA, and Stanford.

== Biography ==
Gewirtz grew up in Fair Lawn, New Jersey.

=== Early career ===
In 1982, Gewirtz moved to Berkeley, California to become a product manager for Unix porting house UniSoft. In 1983, he moved on to early RISC mini-computer vendor Pyramid Technology, where he introduced a version of Unix that merged BSD 4.2 and AT&T Unix System V and managed the company's work with artificial intelligence systems. In 1986, Gewirtz was hired as director of product marketing for Living Videotext, where he worked for controversial blogging and RSS pioneer Dave Winer.

When the company merged with Symantec, he worked as an executive there for a short time before leaving in 1987 to start his first company, Hyperpress Publishing. He also held the unusual title of "Godfather" at Apple Inc., and served on the board of the Software Entrepreneurs Forum (now SVForum) in Santa Clara County, California.

In 1993, Gewirtz moved to New Jersey and founded Component Software Corporation to publish the FileFlex relational database engine, which was "the first, and at one time, the most popular commercial PC database designed for multimedia applications." It allowed developers to embed a relational database engine in Macromedia Director. Gewirtz acquired all rights to the product in September 1993, rewrote the product from the ground up using new searching, floating point, and compiler technology. and licensed the product to Macromedia (now part of Adobe Systems) for inclusion in Director.

=== Technology editor ===
Gewirtz began his editorial career in 1979 as a contributing editor for Creative Computing magazine, where he worked for hypertext inventor Ted Nelson and David H. Ahl, author of the first million-selling computer book. In the early 1980s, Creative Computing was purchased by Ziff-Davis, where, on and off over the next 20 years, Gewirtz worked as editor-in-chief for various Ziff publications.

In the early 1980s, he was a contributing editor and then software editor for S-100 Microsystems Magazine, and a technical reviewer for Osborne/McGraw-Hill. In the mid-1990s, he was editor of the CD-ROM publication The Notes Enthusiast, published by jointly by IBM and Ziff-Davis. In 1995, Gewirtz was hired as the editor-in-chief of Workspace for Lotus Notes, published by Ziff-Davis. From 1996 to 1998, he was editor-in-chief of The Insider for Lotus cc:Mail, also published by Ziff-Davis, and in 1997, became the editor-in-chief of The Notes Report, originally published by IDG and then acquired by Ziff-Davis. In 2010, Gewirtz once again became involved with the Ziff-Davis brand, joining CBS Interactive as a contributing editor and ZDNet as the ZDNet Government blogger.

=== ZATZ Publishing ===
In 1998, Gewirtz founded ZATZ Publishing, which published PalmPower Magazine, produced under license from Palm, Inc. In August 1998, he started DominoPower Magazine and in 2002 OutlookPower Magazine, which focus on IBM Lotus and Microsoft e-mail and collaboration software, respectively. In 1999, the New Jersey Technology Council presented Gewirtz an award for the ZATZ publishing strategy.

In 2003, Gewirtz started the IBM Java EE and WebSphere-related news weekly WebSpherePower Magazine, renamed PalmPower Magazine to Computing Unplugged Magazine, broadening its scope beyond Palm personal digital assistants into a consumer technology magazine with a mobile focus, and began publishing Connected Photographer Magazine.

== White House e-mail controversy ==
As his main premise, Gewirtz claims that White House e-mail is broken and needs to be fixed. He identifies five areas of concern:

=== Inadequate archiving methodology ===
He first claims the White House's e-mail archiving system is inadequate to the point of negligence. He reports, based on Congressional testimony by White House Chief Information Officer Theresa Payton, that the White House currently stores its e-mail archives in Microsoft Outlook .PST files. Based on Payton's testimony and Microsoft's guidelines for Outlook files, Gewirtz claims these files are above their safe storage capacity.

=== Email migration during time of war ===
His second claim is that the White House has given no technically sound reason for switching e-mail systems from IBM Lotus Notes to Microsoft Outlook. During Payton's testimony phase, Congressman Darrell Issa asked, "Lotus Notes no longer exists, right?" Payton replied, "It is no longer supported. Some groups may still use it, but it is no longer supported." Since Notes is still an actively supported, high-profile IBM product, Gewirtz asks why such a critical migration was done during a build-up to war.

=== Influence of the 1939 Hatch Act ===
Gewirtz also takes issue with the Hatch Act of 1939 for two reasons. First, he claims that since the Hatch Act apparently bans White House staffers from using government e-mail resources for political communication, White House aides used political party e-mail resources instead, effectively bypassing the record-keeping requirements of the Presidential Records Act. He claims in the 2,072 days between September 11, 2001 and May 15, 2007, a minimum of 103.6 million messages were likely sent by White House staffers on Republican National Committee servers.

He also claims that insecure messaging puts national security at risk. He claims that since the White House staffers must bypass government servers, their email is traveling across the Internet without necessary security. He cites numerous national security risk scenarios that could occur due to possible interception of White House email messages.

=== Poor management of portable technology ===
Finally, Gewirtz cites Congressional testimony by Susan Ralston, one-time aide to Karl Rove, who stated before Congress that Rove had lost his BlackBerry device on more than one occasion. Gewirtz claims that because BlackBerry devices can store significant data, losing these devices poses another security risk.

This concern was proven true during the week of April 21, 2008 when Rafael Quintero Curiel, lead press advance man for the Mexican delegation, was caught stealing BlackBerry devices belonging to White House staffers who were attending meetings between U.S. President George W. Bush, Canadian Prime Minister Stephen Harper, and Mexican President Felipe Calderón, who were at the 2008 North American Leaders' Summit.

In a subsequent article after the publication of the book, Gewirtz also cites additional Payton statements that show an alarming lack of security for personal computers within the White House and for portable media such as flash drives.

=== Recommendations ===
Gewirtz also makes a series of recommendations. He recommends the Hatch Act be modified to require White House workers to use secured government systems for all communication. He recommends the establishment of a professional, administration-spanning "Electronic Communications Protection Detail" reporting to the United States Secret Service. Finally, he recommends the Electronic Communications Protection Detail manage all email, archiving, and messaging security for White House staff.

== Politics ==
Gewirtz claims to have voted for both Democrats and Republicans and acknowledges voting for Ronald Reagan, George H. W. Bush, and Bill Clinton. According to Gewirtz, "At various times in my life, I've called myself a Republican and at other times, a Democrat. These days, both parties have sufficiently pissed me off that I'm pretty much an independent."

== Education ==
In the late 1970s, Gewirtz was a Radiological Defense Officer and attended the Defense Civil Preparedness Agency (DCPA) Staff College. The DCPA was originally part of the United States Department of Defense and became part of the Federal Emergency Management Agency (FEMA) in 1979. He earned his Bachelor of Science degree from Worcester Polytechnic Institute in 1982, where he graduated with distinction. He dropped out of the Ph.D. program at the University of California, Berkeley and was awarded a non-academic jure dignitatis Ph.D. by the University of Kent for accomplishments in his field. He also holds a Master's degree in education, specializing in learning and technology, from Western Governors University.

== Works ==
- HyperTalk and the External Commands (1987) ISBN 978-0945266006
- Lotus Notes 3 Revealed! (1993) ISBN 978-1559584333
- The Flexible Enterprise: How to Reinvent Your Company, Unlock Your Strengths, and Prosper in a Changing World (1996) ISBN 978-0471072461
- Where Have All The E-mails Gone? How Something as Seemingly Benign as White House E-mail Can Have Freaky National Security Consequences (2007) ISBN 978-0945266204
- How To Save Jobs: Reinventing Business, Reinvigorating Work, and Reawakening the American Dream (2010) ISBN 978-0945266013
