= Javier Miyares =

American academic administrator

5th President of University of Maryland Global Campus
- In office October 2012 – January 3, 2021
- Preceded by: Susan C. Aldridge
- Succeeded by: Gregory Fowler

Personal details
- Born: Cuba
- Education: University of Maryland, College Park (BA, MA)

Javier Miyares is a Cuban-American academic administrator. He was president of University of Maryland Global Campus (UMGC).

== Early life and education ==
Javier Miyares was born in Cuba and educated in Jesuit schools. His father was taken prisoner during the Bay of Pigs Invasion. At the age of 14 in 1961, he went to Venezuela and later Miami where he graduated from a Jesuit high school. He entered a seminary in Dominican Republic before moving to Baltimore to live with his brother. Miyares earned a bachelor's, master's, and an all but dissertation from University of Maryland, College Park.

== Career ==
Starting in 2001, Miyares served as a vice president of UMGC. Beginning in February 2012, he served as the acting president replacing Susan C. Aldridge. His appointment as president of UMGC took place in October 2012.
