= Robert E. Guidry =

American military personnel

Brigadier General Robert E. Guidry
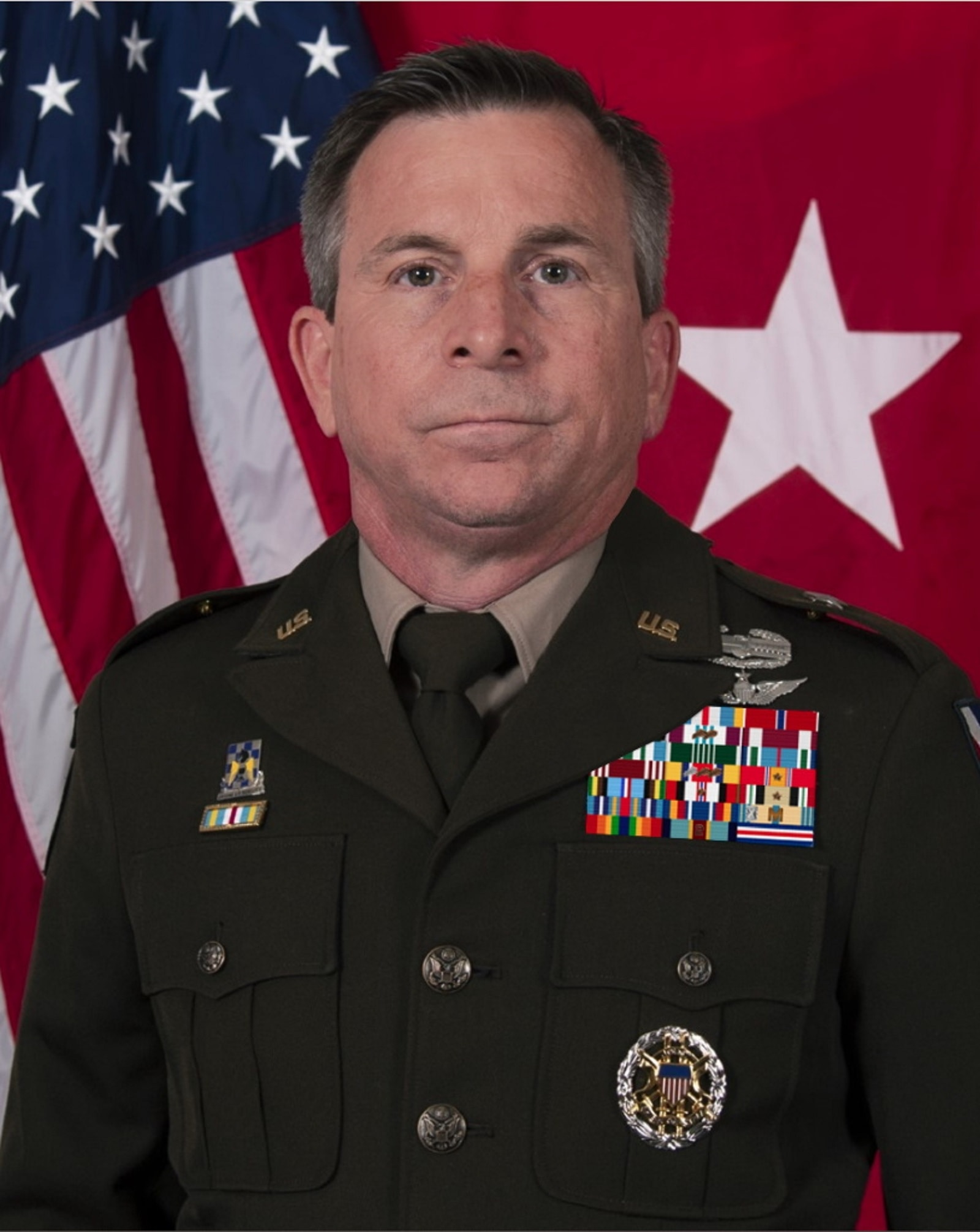
- Born: Opelousas, Louisiana, U.S.
- Allegiance: United States
- Branch: United States Army
- Service years: 1983 – February 2023
- Rank: Brigadier General
- Commands: 86th Training Division; Joint Chiefs of Staff - Army Reserve Element

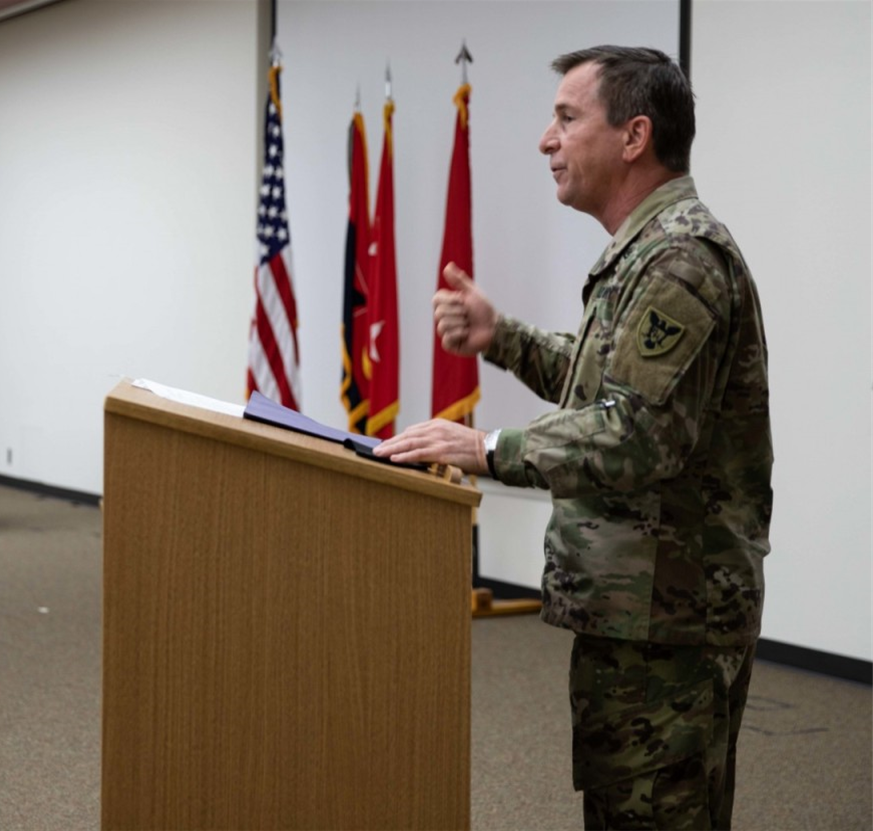
Robert E. Guidry speaks at 86th Training Division ceremony

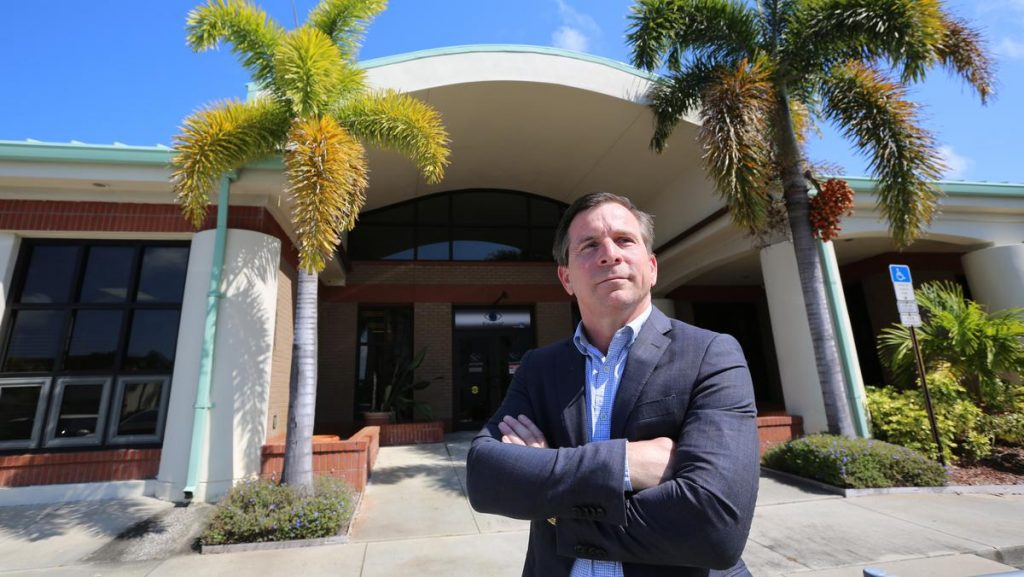
Robert Guidry stands outside his Clearwater, Florida office

Robert E. Guidry is an American tech entrepreneur, investor, and former military personnel. He is the founder, and CEO of Equitus Corporation. His military experience inspired him to create technology that could be used to inform decision making. He is the formerly a United States Army brigadier general, and was the commanding general of the 86th Training Division.

== Life and education ==
Born in Opelousas, Louisiana. He enlisted in the United States Army in 1983, and was direct commissioned into the Army Reserve in 1986.

Guidry's military schools and education include the U.S. Army Aviation Officer Basic Course, U.S. Army Maintenance Test Pilot Course, Combined Logistics Officer Advanced Course, U.S. Army Combined Arms Services Staff School, U.S. Army Command and General Staff Course, Joint Forces Staff College, the Air War College and the U.S. Army War College.

His civilian education includes a BA degree from Thomas Edison State College, an MBA degree from Western Governors University, and a Masters degree of strategic studies from the U.S. Army War College.

== Military career ==
Brigadier General Robert Guidry is the former commanding general of the 86th Training Division. In his previous role, he was the Deputy Commanding General for the 75th Innovation Command, also known as United States Army Reserve Innovation Command (USARIC) in Houston, Texas. He previously commanded the Joint Chiefs of Staff - Army Reserve Element in Suffolk, Virginia. BG Guidry has five combat deployments as a Joint Special Operations Officer with Special Operations Command Central (SOCCENT), Joint Special Operations Command (JSOC), and United States Special Operations Command (SOCOM).

BG Guidry's aviation assignments include XO, 31st Combat Aviation Group Ft Meade, MD, Platoon Leader 327th Aviation Company Ft Meade, MD, S2 1/132nd Aviation Battalion Ft Belvoir, VA, XO, Louisiana State Aviation Command New Orleans, LA, and Aviation Force Manager at National Guard Bureau, Arlington, VA. He served as the S6, 3rd Brigade 75th Division in Chicago, IL, Special Operations Advisor at Joint Staff Deputy Directorate for Special Operations, Lead Advisor on SOCOM Commander's Strategic Development Group, was mobilized to US Central Command as Forces Division Chief and Iraq OPT Chairman. His last two assignments have been Commander 3rd Brigade, Gulf Division in the 75th Training Command and Commander, Joint Chiefs of Staff Army Reserve Element.

His decorations and badges include the Defense Superior Service Medal, Bronze Star Medal, Defense Meritorious Service Medal (with 2 Oak Leaf Clusters), Joint Service Commendation Medal, Army Commendation Medal, Joint Service Achievement Medal, Army Achievement Medal, Iraq Campaign Medal, Afghan Campaign Medal, Reserve Component Achievement Medal, National Defense Service Medal (with Bronze Service Star), Global War on Terrorism Expeditionary Medal, Global War on Terrorism Service Medal, Armed Forces Reserve medal (with Silver Hourglass and M” Device), Army Service Ribbon, Reserve Components Overseas Training Ribbon (with Numeral 3), Senior Army Aviator Badge and Combat Action Badge.

== Business career ==
In his civilian role, he leads a cloud computing and analytics company in Clearwater, Florida. Robert Guidry founded Equitus Corporation in 2008. It was formerly called SC2 Corp. The corporation was built on emerging technologies to become one of the first Graph Data Fabric pioneers. In November 2022, Robert Guidry announced the expansion of his corporation into three new subsidiaries. Through the creation of Equitus International, he expanded the sale of Equitus products oversees in Dubai for the purpose of making the technology and platform licensing available to Gulf States allies and partners. Under Robert Guidry's direction, Equitus Corporation also created Equitus National Security Group (NSG) and Novus Point.

== Awards and honors ==
Guidry's decorations and medals include:

- Defense Superior Service Medal
- Bronze Star Medal
- Meritorious Service Medal
- Combat Action Badge
- Joint Chiefs of Staff Identification Badge
