= Mary-Margaret Wilson =

- Born: 1961 (age 64–65)
- Education: University of Ibadan(class of 1983); New York University Downtown Hospital(class of 2000)
- Occupation: Medical Officer
- Employer: UnitedHealth Group
- Known for: Chief Medical Officer and Executive Vice President
- Title: MD

Mary-Margaret Wilson is a Nigerian-American, board-certified internal medicine physician. In 2021, she was appointed chief medical officer of UnitedHealth Group.

== Early life and education ==
Wilson was born in Nigeria and raised by a single mother. After completing her medical degree at the University of Ibadan, she obtained her MD from the same institution before pursuing further studies at New York University Downtown Hospital, Western Governors University and the Royal College of Physicians in the UK.

== Career ==
She has practiced medicine in Europe, Africa, North and South America. Before joining UnitedHealth Group in 2008, she was an associate professor at St. Louis University in Missouri, where she taught internal and geriatric medicine. Wilson has published more than 70 articles in peer-reviewed medical journals and textbooks.

In 2021, she was appointed chief medical officer of UnitedHealth Group, where she would oversee more than 340,000 skilled medical professionals.

== Personal life ==
She identifies as an African-American LGBTQ woman and originally from Cross-Rivers State, Nigeria. Wilson is married to Moji Solar-Wilson, a Nigerian-American real estate broker.

== Accolades ==
- Top 100 most influential African-American leaders (2021)
- Top 50 most influential clinical executives by Modern Healthcare (2022 and 2024)
