= Susan C. Aldridge =

American academic administrator

2nd President of Thomas Jefferson University
- Incumbent
- Assumed office July 19, 2023
- Preceded by: Mark Tykocinski

President of Drexel University Online
- In office October 15, 2013 – July 2019
- Preceded by: Ken Hartman
- Succeeded by: Position abolished

5th President of University of Maryland University College
- In office February 1, 2006 – March 31, 2012
- Preceded by: Gerald Heeger
- Succeeded by: Javier Miyares

Personal details
- Education: Colorado Women's College (BA); University of Colorado Denver (MPA, PhD)
- Occupation: Academic administrator
- Website: drsusanaldridge.com

Academic background
- Thesis: The Medicare prospective payment theory as applied to the management of patient care outcomes (1991)
- Doctoral advisor: Robert Gage

Susan C. Aldridge is an American academic administrator, currently serving as president of Thomas Jefferson University. She was previously president of Drexel University Online. She was the president of University of Maryland University College, vice chancellor of the global campus at Troy University, and a professor of management, organizational behavior, and policy analysis at the National University of Singapore.

== Education ==
Aldridge completed a B.A. in sociology and psychology at Colorado Women's College in 1977. She then attended the University of Colorado Denver where she obtained an M.P.A. in 1987 and then a Ph.D. in public administration, graduating in 1991. During this period she worked for the Denver Regional Council of Governments, initially as a planner and then as a division director.

== Career ==
From 1991 to 1994 Aldridge was a professor of management, organizational behavior, and policy analysis at the National University of Singapore where she conducted research on health and aging policy. In 1995, she was appointed director of the Western Region at Troy University in Alabama and promoted to vice chancellor of the global campus in 2001.

She was appointed president of University of Maryland University College in 2006. She resigned in 2012.

Aldridge later became a Senior Fellow at the American Association of State Colleges and Universities. In 2013 she joined Drexel University as senior vice president for online learning and president of Drexel University Online.

She is a trustee of Thomas Jefferson University. In the summer of 2023, she became its interim president. In May 2024, she was named president.

== Professional affiliations and recognition ==
In 2007, Aldridge travelled to Chile and Brazil as part of a special delegation to promote U.S. higher education, led by former U.S. Secretary of Education Margaret Spellings. She served as both chair of the 2006 US-China Forum on Distance Education, as well as co-chair of the 2005 Department of Defense Task Force on Distance Learning Standards.

Aldridge was an elected board member of the International Academy of Business Disciplines, and a member of the NASULGC-Sloan National Commission on Online Learning. In 2008, she was appointed by the U.S. Secretary of Defense to the Air University Board of Visitors, and later in 2015, to the Marine Corps University Board of Visitors.

In 2010, Aldridge was a recipient of the Women in Technology Global Impact Award. The Daily Record named her among Maryland's Top 100 Women in 2008, and the Most Influential Marylanders in 2009, and The Washingtonian recognized her as one of Washington's 100 Most Powerful Women in both 2009 and 2011. In 2013, she was elected to the United States Distance Learning Association Hall of Fame.

== Books ==
- Wired for Success: Real-world Solutions for Transforming Higher Education. (2014, American Association of State Colleges and Universities) ISBN 0880442506
