= Hiram Bertoch =

American author

- Born: Hiram J. Bertoch; May 5, 1977 (age 49); Salt Lake City, Utah, U.S.
- Education: Cyprus High School; Western Governors University
- Occupations: Author, businessman, teacher
- Spouse: Anna Bertoch
- Writing career
- Pen name: El Guapo
- Genre: Novels
- Notable works: The Mountain Christians; An Otter's Guidebook

Hiram J. Bertoch (born May 5, 1977) is an American author, best known for writing Apollo Salvatoir: Shā-Shǔ The Dragon, a national bestseller, The Mountain Christians, which was a regional bestseller, and An Otter's Guidebook To Being Obnoxiously Happy.

== Biography ==
Bertoch began writing in 1998, mostly for textbook companies. His early works were mainly educational articles and textbook entries. He has a bachelor's degree in Earth Science, and a master's degree in Biology.

In the early 2000s Bertoch wrote a series of educational storybooks for The KidsKnowIt Network. These were later translated into Spanish and Portuguese by the Jesuit arm of The Catholic Church and distributed to millions of school children throughout São Paulo, Brazil and Central America.

In 2012 Bertoch wrote his first full novel titled The Mountain Christians, which sold approximately 15,000 copies mainly in Utah, Idaho, Wyoming, and pockets of California. The book reached regional bestseller status in the Spring of 2013, and gained Bertoch a loyal following in the United States.

During the pandemic of 2019, Bertoch wrote his first national bestseller, which was titled Apollo Salvatoir: Shā-Shǔ The Dragon. In addition to these two best sellers, Bertoch has written a number of storybooks, and novellas that have sold to smaller audiences.

Bertoch lives with his wife and seven children in Hunter, Utah. Some of which are Hiram Bertoch Jr and the twins Oliver E. Bertoch and Annalysha M. Bertoch.

== Published works ==
=== Non-fiction ===
- Numerous textbooks (1998-2015)
- An Otter's Guidebook To Being Obnoxiously Happy (2016)

=== Series ===
- The Adventures of Super Nolan
  1. Space (2002)
  2. Oceans (2002)
  3. Jungles (2002)
  4. Poles (2003)
  5. Moons (2003)
  6. Planets (2004)
  7. Deserts (2004)
  8. Plants (2004)
  9. Dinosaurs (2005)
- The Mountain Christians
  1. For The Strength of The Hills (2012)
  2. Master The Tempest Is Raging (2018)
- Apollo Salvatoir
  1. Apollo Salvatoir: Shā-Shǔ The Dragon (2022)

=== Children's books ===
- Godfather Drosselmeyer (2016)
- Malloroni And Cheese: And Other Stories (2017)
