= Gary Gates (politician) =

Texan businessman and politician

Member of the Texas House of Representatives from the 28th district
- Incumbent
- Assumed office January 29, 2020
- Preceded by: John Zerwas

Personal details
- Born: Gary Wilton Gates Jr. July 22, 1959 (age 67)
- Party: Republican
- Spouse: Melissa
- Children: 13
- Education: Rogers State University
- Occupation: Real estate
- Website: Campaign website

Gary Wilton Gates Jr. (born July 22, 1959) is a Texas businessman and a Republican member of the Texas House of Representatives for House District 28, which is located in Fort Bend County in the southwest Houston metro area.

== Texas House of Representatives ==
On January 28, 2020, Gates won the special runoff election for Texas House District 28. He defeated the Democrat, an educator, Elizabeth A. "Eliz" Markowitz of Katy, Texas, by 58% of the vote to 42%, a 16-point win that has been characterized as an "easy win". Saying the district was a bellwether, Democratic presidential candidates Joe Biden and Elizabeth Warren endorsed Markowitz; and Mike Bloomberg and Julian Castro endorsed Markowitz and block walked for her, attempting to flip the district and defeat Gates. Former U.S. Senate nominee and presidential candidate Beto O'Rourke knocked on doors and rallied canvassers. The race was Gates' seventh run for political office.

After the election, the Republicans criticized the Democrats as overplaying their hand in the Gates special election; while the Democrats pointed to unique aspects of the campaign, specifically Gates' ability to self-fund his campaign. Gates spent about $1.8 million of his own money on the campaign. Markowitz was given political donations from Forward Majority for $420,000, Democratic Legislative Campaign Committee for $170,000, and State Representative Celia Israel's Texas House Democratic Campaign Committee of $120,000.

Turnout for the special runoff election was very high and possibly historic since there were over 30,000 voters, a 20 percent turnout which is the highest in Texas since at least 1992. Gates defeated a Republican opponent, small business owner Michelle D. "Schell" Hammel of Katy, in the March 3, 2020 primary, receiving 95% of the vote. Gates faced Markowitz again in the November general election where he was reelected to a full term.

During the 2023 legislative session, Gates supported a ban on Democrats being given committee chairmanships as long as the Republicans hold the majority of seats. The rule change went into effect in the 2025 session.

== Electoral history ==
2024 Texas House of Representatives District 28 general election
Party	Candidate	Votes	%
Republican	Gary Gates (incumbent)	56,890	60.55%
Democratic	Marty Rocha	37,058	39.45%
Total votes		93,948	100%
Republican hold			

2024 Texas House of Representatives District 28 Republican primary
Party	Candidate	Votes	%
Republican	Gary Gates (incumbent)	10,612	61.07%
Republican	Dan Mathews	6,764	38.93%
Total votes		17,376	100.00%

2022 Texas House of Representatives 28th District general election
Party	Candidate	Votes	%
Republican	Gary Gates (incumbent)	40,240	61.56%
Democratic	Nelvin Adriatico	25,124	38.44%
Total votes		65,364	100.00%
Republican hold			

2022 Texas House of Representatives 28th District Republican primary
Party	Candidate	Votes	%
Republican	Gary Gates (incumbent)	6,702	75.6
Republican	Robert Boettcher	2,168	24.4
Total votes		8,870	100.00%

2020 Texas House of Representatives 28th District general election
Party	Candidate	Votes	%
Republican	Gary Gates (incumbent)	66,619	55.3
Democratic	Elizabeth Markowitz	53,908	44.7
Total votes		120,527	100.00%
Republican hold			

2020 Texas House of Representatives 28th District Republican primary
Party	Candidate	Votes	%
Republican	Gary Gates (incumbent)	19,451	95.3
Republican	Schell Hammel	963	4.7
Total votes		20,414	100.00%

2019 Texas House of Representative District 28; special election runoff
Party	Candidate	Votes	%
Republican	Gary Gates	17,484	58.1%
Democratic	Elizabeth Markowitz	12,629	41.9%
Total votes		30,113	100.0%
Republican hold			

2019 Texas House of Representative District 28; special election
Party	Candidate	Votes	%
Democratic	Elizabeth Markowitz	11,356	39.1%
Republican	Gary Gates	8,275	28.5%
Republican	Tricia Krenek	5,272	18.1%
Republican	Anna Allred	2,705	9.03%
Republican	Gary Hale	712	2.4%
Republican	Sarah Laningham	503	1.7%
Republican	Clinton Purnell	256	0.9%
Total votes		29,079	100.0%

2016 Texas Railroad Commissioner Republican primary runoff
Party	Candidate	Votes	%
Republican	Wayne Christian	192,217	51.1%
Republican	Gary Gates	184,170	48.9%
Total votes		376,387	100.00%

2016 Texas Railroad Commissioner Republican primary
Party	Candidate	Votes	%
Republican	Gary Gates	586,846	28.4%
Republican	Wayne Christian	408,056	19.7%
Republican	Ron Hale	303,847	14.7%
Republican	Lance Christian	250,523	12.1%
Republican	Weston Martinez	208,710	10.1%
Republican	Doug Jeffrey	192,999	9.3%
Republican	John Greytok	117,125	5.7%
Total votes		2,068,106	100.0%

Texas special general election, 2014: Senate District 18
Party	Candidate	Votes	%
Republican	Lois Kolkhorst	21,961	55.81
Republican	Gary Gates	13,439	34.15
Democratic	Cindy Drabek	1,893	4.81
Democratic	Christian E. Hawkins	1,280	3.25
Republican	Charles Gregory	779	1.98
Total votes		39,352	100.00
Republican hold			

Republican primary, 2006: Senate District 18
Party	Candidate	Votes	%
Republican	Glenn Hegar	19,934	54.92
Republican	Gary Gates	12,933	35.63
Republican	David Stall	3,428	9.44
Majority		7,001	19.29
Total votes		36,295	100.00

== Personal life ==
Gates lives in Richmond, Texas, a suburb of Houston southwest of the city, with his wife, Melissa, and his 13 children, of whom 11 are adopted.

Texas House of Representatives
Preceded by John Zerwas	Texas State Representative for District 28 (Fort Bend County); 2020–present	Succeeded by Incumbent
