= Gerald Heeger =

3rd President of University of Maryland University College
- In office 1999–2005
- Preceded by: T. Benjamin Massey
- Succeeded by: Susan C. Aldridge

Personal details
- Born: 1942 (age 83–84) Iowa, U.S.
- Children: 2
- Education: University of California, Berkeley (B.A.); University of Chicago (M.A., Ph.D.)

Gerald A. Heeger (born 1942) is an American academic and college administrator. He was the third president of University of Maryland University College.

== Early life and education ==
Heeger was born in 1942 in Iowa where his father owned a grocery store. He was raised in Omaha, Nebraska. In 1965, he graduated from University of California, Berkeley. He earned a master's and Ph.D. in political science from University of Chicago. He was a Fulbright scholar in India.

== Career ==
Heeger taught at University of Virginia in the department of government and foreign affairs. In 1980, he became dean of the school of continuing studies at Adelphi University and later became provost and executive vice president. He became dean of the New School for Social Research in 1987. Heeger joined New York University (NYU) in 1991. He was the dean of the New York University School of Professional Studies where he created NYU Online. In 1999, he was appointed third President of University of Maryland University College (UMUC), succeeding T. Benjamin Massey who retired the previous year. In 2005, he was succeeded by Susan C. Aldridge. Heeger left UMUC to become the founding president of Whitney International University System Ltd.

== Personal life ==
Heeger is married to Geraldine, a librarian, college English teacher and a teacher of English as a second language. They have two children.
