= Kryss Shane =

American social work educator, consultant, author and public speaker

- Born: March 15
- Education: Ohio State University, Barry University, Western Governors University, University of the Cumberlands
- Occupations: Social work educator and consultant
- Years active: 1996-present
- Known for: American LGBT+ expert, author, college professor, and public speaker
- Website: www.thisiskryss.com

Dr. Kryss Shane is an American LGBT+ expert, social work educator, consultant, author and public speaker recognized as an LGBT+ expert by ABC News, CNN, Oprah Magazine, Rolling Stone, Reader's Digest and Playboy.

Shane is the author of The Educator's Guide to LGBT+ Inclusion, which has been praised as a "straightforward" and resourceful guide, offering educators, administrators, and school support staff practical strategies to create an inclusive and supportive academic environment for LGBT+ individuals, addressing discrimination, promoting positive mental health, and advocating for social inclusion within educational institutions.

Her second book Creating an LGBT+ Inclusive Workplace: The Practical Resource Guide for Business Leaders was chosen as one of five Amazon Australia's World Pride books.

Shane was named one of the world's 13 "Pride Inclusion Advocates" by Pride Life Global Magazine.

Shane currently tours the world on the speaker's circuit while continuing to publish books. She also serves as a professor of social work and field liaison at Fordham University, Columbia University, and National Louis University.

She is a cast member on I Am Jazz and has also made appearances in Freestyle Love Supreme and I Love the '80s 3-D.

== Bibliography ==
- The Educator's Guide to LGBT+ Inclusion: A Practical Resource for K-12 Teachers, Administrators, and School Support Staff. Jessica Kingsley Publishers. 2021. ISBN 978-0-367-67812-8.
- Creating an LGBT+ Inclusive Workplace: The Practical Resource Guide for Business Leaders. Routledge. 2021. ISBN 978-1-78775-108-8.
- Creating an LGBT+ Inclusive University: A Practical Resource Guide for Faculty and Administrators. Routledge. 2022. ISBN 978-1-032-18084-7.
- The Medical Professional's Guide to LGBT+ Inclusion: Creating a Workplace Culture that Nurtures a Welcoming, Inclusive, and Affirming Environment. Productivity Press. 2023. ISBN 978-0-367-76511-8.
