= Heeter =

Heeter is a surname. Notable people with the surname include:

- Cal Heeter (born 1988), American ice hockey player
- Gene Heeter (born 1941), American football player

== See also ==
- Heeger
- Peeter
