= Texas's 28th House of Representatives district =

Texas legislative district

Texas's 28th State House of Representatives district
Representative
Gary Gates; R–Richmond
- Demographics: 39.6% White; 13.1% Black; 27.1% Hispanic
- Population (2020): 197,627

District 28 is a district in the Texas House of Representatives. It was created in the 3rd Legislature (1849–1851).

The district is wholly within Fort Bend County and accounts for nearly a quarter (24%) of the county's representation in the chamber. It encompasses Fulshear, Weston Lakes, nearly the entirety of Rosenberg, and just over half of Sugar Land. The district also includes a small portion of Katy, with a large portion of the population in unincorporated areas.
