= Western Governors University =

American online university

- Type: Private online university
- Established: 1997 (29 years ago)
- Founders: Mike Leavitt, Roy Romer
- Accreditation: NWCCU
- Endowment: $3.7 million (2025)
- President: Scott Pulsipher
- Provost: Courtney Hills McBeth
- Faculty: 2,974 (full-time) 1,220 (part-time)
- Students: 156,935 (fall 2022)
- Undergraduates: 112,807 (fall 2022)
- Postgraduates: 44,128 (fall 2022)
- Location: Millcreek, Utah, U.S.
- Campus: Online
- Colors: Navy blue and white
- Nickname: Night Owls
- Mascot: Sage the Night Owl
- Website: wgu.edu

Western Governors University (WGU) is a private online university based in Millcreek, Utah, United States. The university uses an online competency-based learning model, providing advanced education for working professionals. Degrees awarded by WGU are accredited by the Northwest Commission on Schools and Universities (NWCCU). The university was founded by nineteen U.S. governors in 1997, after the idea was formulated at a 1995 meeting of the Western Governors Association to expand education offerings to the internet.

== History ==
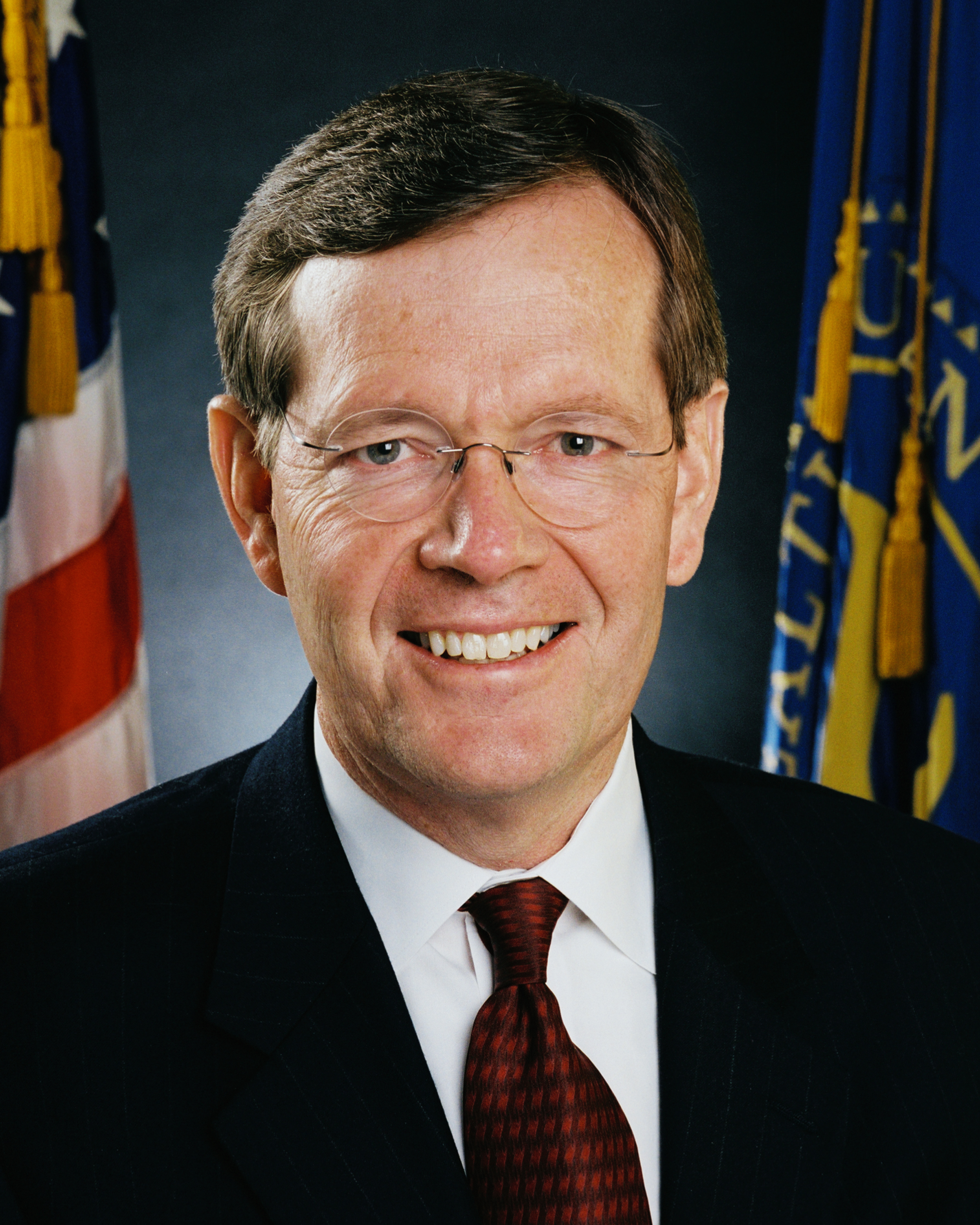
Mike Leavitt, co-founder and Governor of Utah (1993–2003)

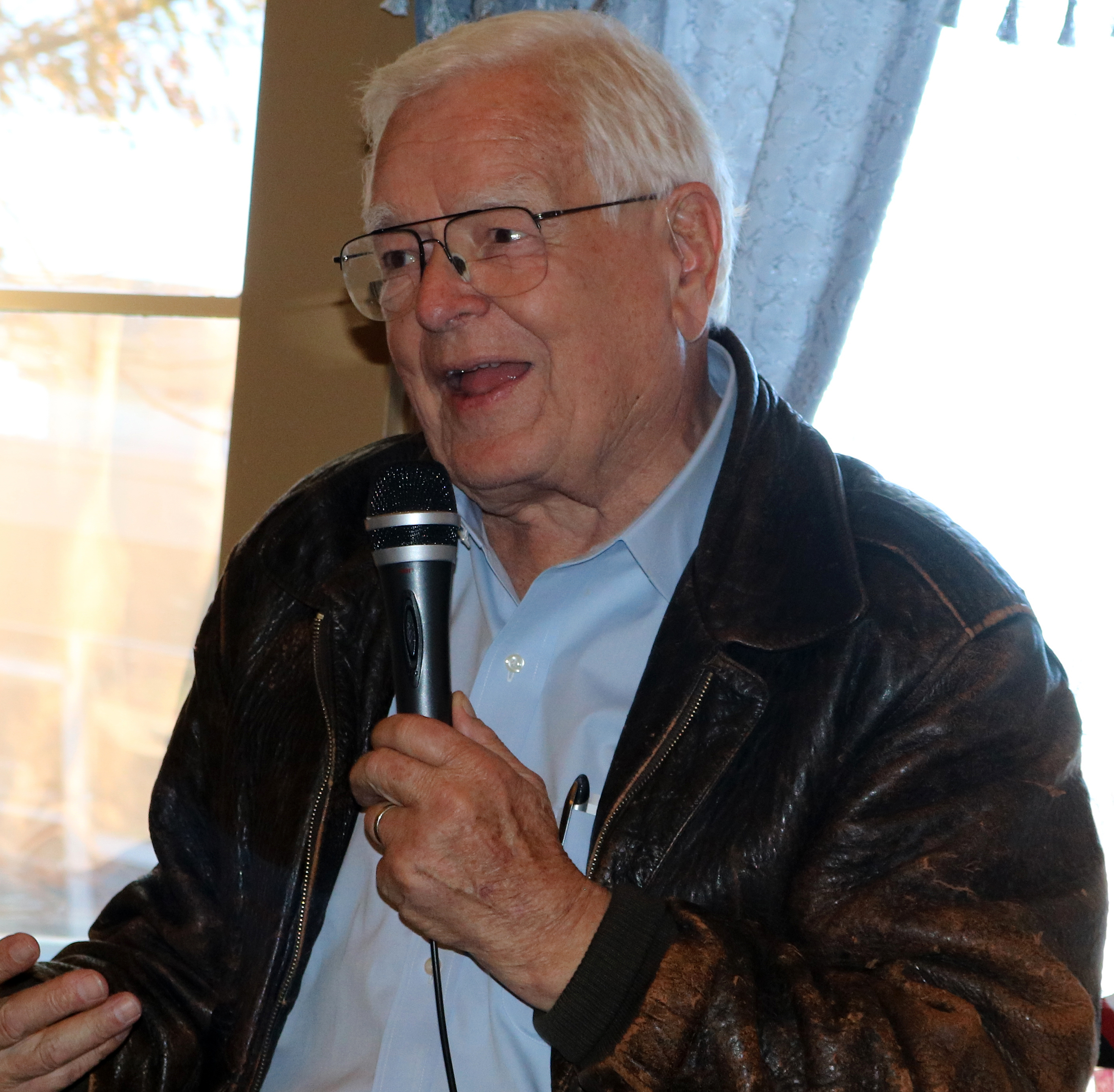
Roy Romer, co-founder and Governor of Colorado (1987–1999)

The idea for WGU was first introduced in 1995 by then-governor of Utah Mike Leavitt at a meeting of the Western Governors Association. WGU was founded in 1997 in the United States by the governors of nineteen U.S. states. The proposal was formalized later that year, and by June 1996 the governors of 19 states had each committed $100,000 to launch a new competency-based university. Although the initial funding came from state governments, the institution was established as a private, nonprofit entity. In January 1997, thirteen governors signed the articles of incorporation, officially creating Western Governors University.

In August 1999, WGU launched its first degree programs including an associate in arts in general education, three technology-focused associates in applied-arts degrees, and one Master of Arts degree in learning and technology. In December 2000, Genevieve Kirch became WGU's first graduate. Kirch earned her Master of Arts, Learning and Technology degree.

In 2001, the United States Department of Education awarded $10 million to found the Teachers College, and the first programs were offered in information technology. In 2003, the university became the first school to be accredited in four different regions by the Interregional Accrediting Committee. In 2006, the fourth college, the College of Health Professions, was founded, and the school's Teachers College became the first online teacher-preparation program to receive NCATE accreditation. In 2010, the first state-established offshoot, WGU Indiana, was founded by Mitch Daniels, governor of Indiana, and the school reached 20,000 students for the first time. In 2011, the Bill & Melinda Gates Foundation provided $4.5 million for WGU Indiana and the creation of WGU Texas and WGU Washington.

On January 8, 2013, Bill Haslam, governor of Tennessee, announced the creation of WGU Tennessee. On January 28, 2013, Governor Jay Nixon of Missouri, in his annual State of the State address, announced the founding of WGU Missouri, creating the fifth state-based subsidiary of WGU. And on June 16, 2015, Governor Brian Sandoval of Nevada launched WGU Nevada, the sixth state-based WGU. The subsidiaries of WGU share the same academic model, faculty, services, accreditation, tuition, and curricula as WGU and were established to give official state endorsement and increased name recognition to WGU in those states, as well as to qualify students of those affiliates for state-based aid. WGU does not maintain physical campuses for these institutions.

As of June 30, 2025, the university had 192,613 currently enrolled students. As of September 2025, WGU had more than 395,000 alumni, and has awarded more than 445,000 degrees. The median age of WGU students is 33.

=== Presidents ===
- E. Jeffrey Livingston, 1997–1999
- Robert Mendenhall, 1999–2016
- Scott Pulsipher, 2016–present

=== 2017 U.S. Department of Education financial aid eligibility audit ===
An audit by the Department of Education's Office of Inspector General, released on September 21, 2017, "concluded that Western Governors University did not comply with the institutional eligibility requirement that limits the percentage of regular students who may enroll in correspondence courses" and that "at least 69 of the 102 courses were not designed to offer regular and substantive interaction with an instructor and, therefore, did not meet the regulatory definition of distance education." Consequently, the audit found that most courses at the university fell short of the required standards for Title IV of the Federal Financial Aid Act as outlined in a 1992 law that defines financial aid eligibility. The U.S. Department of Education's Office of Inspector General recommended that WGU repay the federal government more than $712 million.

Liz Hill, a spokeswoman for the Department of Education, said in a statement to the Salt Lake Tribune that they were reviewing the Inspector General's report, while also saying "the innovative student-first model used by this school and others like it has garnered bipartisan support over the last decade."

In a response from WGU that was enclosed with the final audit report, WGU president Scott D. Pulsipher said "The findings in the OIG's report are based on misinterpretation and misapplication of statutory and regulatory guidance." He said "The OIG has applied an arbitrary definition and antiquated interpretation of instruction and faculty roles" that "is not aligned with law nor consistent with today's online- and technology-enabled model".

Paul Fain, the news editor for Inside Higher Ed, said the "much anticipated high-stakes audit" had begun more than four years earlier and the findings were "not a surprise to most observers", due to their reliance on a 1992 law that defines aid eligibility for distance education programs. He noted that the Inspector General had previously criticized accreditation assessments for competency-based education programs in 2015, partly due to concerns about the amount of interaction between faculty and students. He reported that "Experts said the Trump administration is unlikely to follow through on the inspector general's recommendations, which the department can reject," and that "WGU enjoys a good track record with its accreditor and broad bipartisan support in Washington, with the Obama administration having often praised the university as an innovator."

In January 2019, the U.S. Department of Education's Federal Student Aid (FSA) office issued their final decision disagreeing with the inspector general and determining that WGU was indeed eligible to participate in federal student aid. In making its final determination, FSA reviewed the Department's Office of Inspector General's (OIG) report, examined WGU's records regarding interactions between students and academic staff during the year audited, and also reviewed the favorable findings of WGU's accrediting agency regarding the institution's academic model. FSA determined that, particularly in light of a lack of clear guidance from the department at the time of the audit period, WGU's efforts to comply with the governing law and regulations were reasonable and undertaken in good faith. OIG ultimately agreed with FSA's issuance of the final audit determination.

== Governance ==
WGU is governed by its board of trustees and numerous state governors.

The university's National Advisory Board consists of leaders from private corporations and foundations which support the university. Current members include Google, Microsoft, Bill & Melinda Gates Foundation and AT&T among many others. Each state-affiliate school also has a local chancellor and advisory board from within the state.

The university has no physical campus and does not participate in intercollegiate sports.

== Academics ==
WGU online degree offerings as of 2025
| School | Bachelor's degree programs | Master's degree programs |
|---|---|---|
| School of Business | 13 options | 12 options |
| School of Education | 14 options | 15 options |
| School of Technology | 11 options | 7 options |
| Leavitt School of Health | 8 options | 16 options |

WGU is composed of four schools, each offering bachelor's and master's degree programs. As of March 2025, there are 96 bachelor's, master's, and post-baccalaureate degree programs, which include teacher endorsement and preparation programs, were offered among the four Schools. WGU offers 11 certificate programs and 23 single courses.

Students will primarily interact with three types of faculty at WGU: program mentors, course instructors, and evaluators.

Program Mentors

After being cleared for enrollment, each student is assigned a Program Mentor. The program mentor is an expert in the field who will create a personalized term plan, provide information on programs, policies, procedures and assess students' strengths and development needs to help establish a study plan. The assigned program mentor will work with the student each semester until graduation.

Course Instructors

When a student begins a course, they are assigned a primary course instructor for that course. These subject matter experts have advanced degrees such as a doctorate or other significant post-graduate work in the courses they instruct. Course instructors work with students via one-to-many or one-to-one forums. They provide instruction both proactively and re-actively, with the type and intensity of instruction varying based on a student's needs in a particular area. Additionally, they provide content expertise for students who are struggling with course material.

Evaluators

Evaluators are subject-matter experts who review assessments to determine if competency has been demonstrated. They are experts in their areas of evaluation, with doctoral degrees or other significant post-graduate work. They review submissions extensively, providing clear and comprehensive feedback to support student development. Their primary focus is on evaluating student performance, free of bias and other barriers to fair and timely evaluation because they do not personally interact with students or develop the curriculum and assessments.

Military Advanced Education & Transition and Viqtory Media have repeatedly named WGU as a military-friendly institution in their yearly reports.

=== Accreditation ===
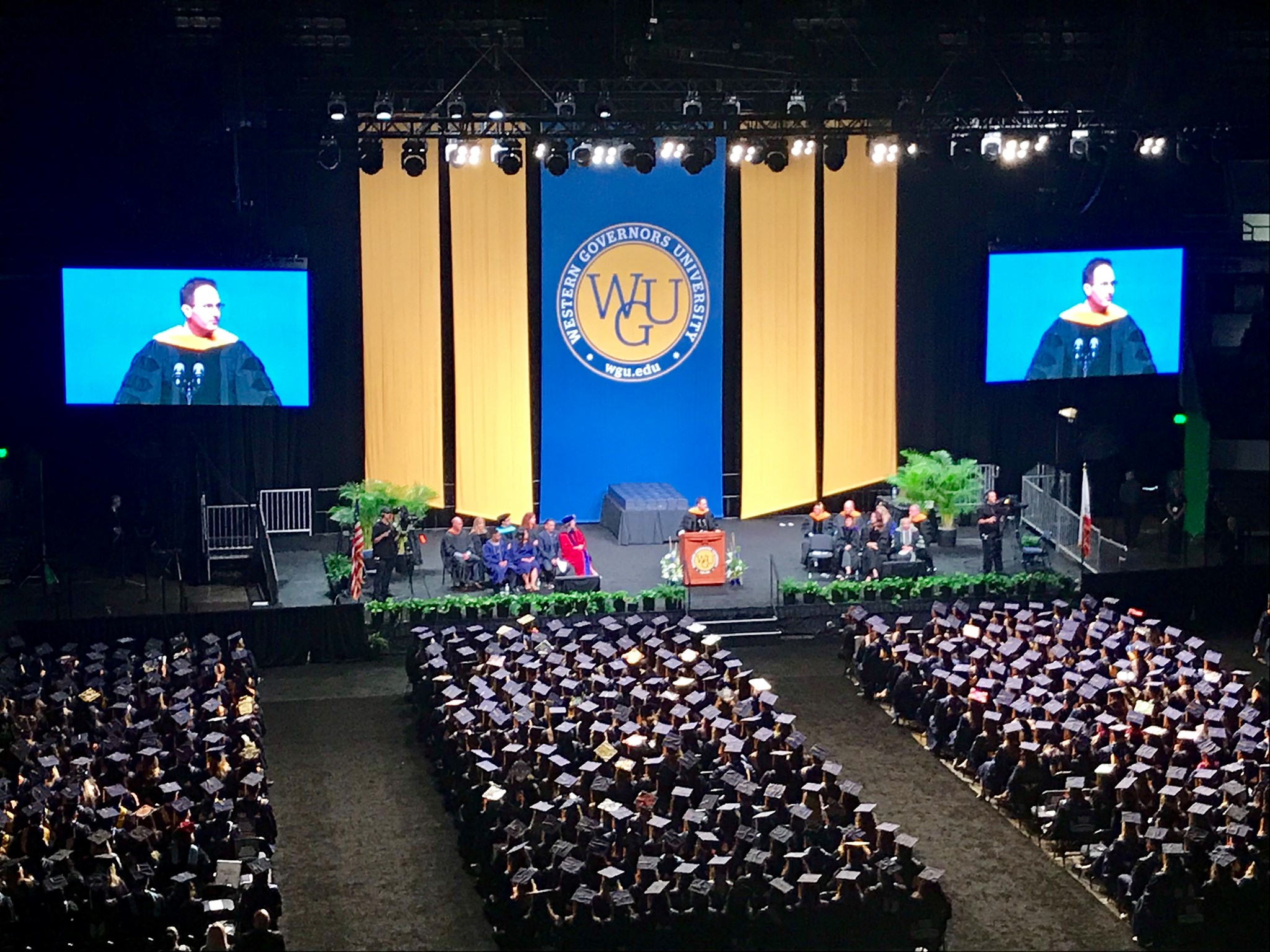
Master's Commencement Ceremony, 2019

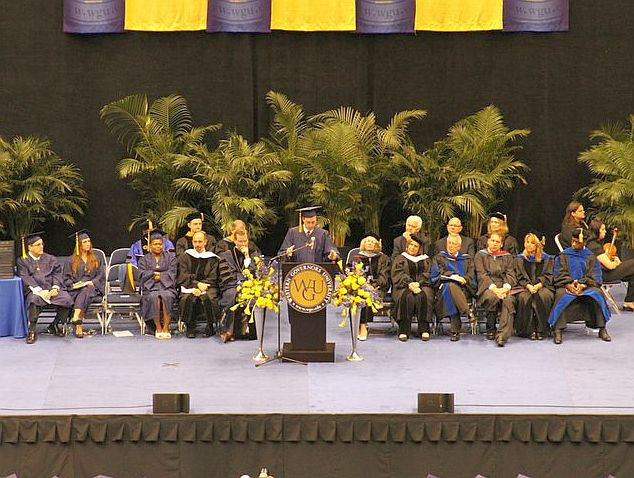
Undergraduate Commencement Ceremony, 2013

WGU is accredited by the Northwest Commission on Schools and Universities. WGU states that it was the first and only university to date to be reviewed and awarded accreditation by four differing regional accreditors.

In 2006, the WGU Teachers College became the first exclusively online school to receive accreditation from the National Council for the Accreditation of Teacher Education (NCATE). In 2018, the university's education programs became accredited by the Council for the Accreditation of Educator Preparation (CAEP), NCATE's successor.

In May 2009, WGU's nursing education programs were accredited by the Commission on Collegiate Nursing Education (CCNE). The initial accreditation, which had a five-year term, was awarded following a process that included a site visit as well as a review of WGU's nursing curriculum. In May 2014, CCNE extended WGU's accreditation through June 2024.

In 2011, WGU's B.S. in Health Informatics degree received accreditation from the Commission on Accreditation for Health Informatics and Information Management Education (CAHIIM).

In 2018, the WGU College of Business was accredited by the Accreditation Council for Business Schools and Programs (ACBSP).

In 2023, WGU's B.S. in Computer Science received accreditation from the Accreditation Board of Engineering and Technology (ABET).

=== Schools ===
WGU offers online bachelor's and master's degree programs through the following Schools:

WGU Schools
| College | Year founded | Students as of June 2025 |
|---|---|---|
| School of Business | 1999 | 62,962 |
| School of Technology | 1999 | 57,629 |
| School of Education | 2003 | 44,564 |
| Leavitt School of Health | 2006 | 27,458 |
| All Enrollment | - | 192,613 |

=== Rankings ===
WGU was listed as "Unranked" in the category "Regional University - West" in U.S. News & World Report's 2020 rankings of Schools and universities. In the category, "Most Innovative Schools", WGU was tied for 12th among western regional universities. In February 2020, the Military Friendly Schools list ranked WGU as the top school for veterans, members of the armed forces, and their dependents.

=== Research ===
In July 2018, WGU launched the Center for Applied Learning Science (CALS), a laboratory which focuses on innovation. In October 2018, Carnegie Mellon University and WGU's CALS teamed up to work on an artificial intelligence professional development project. The partnership was funded by a grant from the National Science Foundation.

=== Competency-based education ===
WGU has competency-based programs for completing course, degree and certificate requirements. Competency-based programs measure acquired skills and learning rather than time on task. Students progress through courses as soon as they can prove they have mastered the material, rather than advancing only when the semester or term ends. Competency-based programs allow students to demonstrate through multiple writing-based or test-based assessments that they have acquired the set of competencies (levels of knowledge, skill, or ability) required to pass specific course within their degree program. Additionally, WGU competencies are geared toward understanding the course material at a level equivalent to a 3.0 (on a 4.0) GPA scale.

WGU was one of the first accredited schools to use the competency-based approach. Former United States Department of Education Secretary Arne Duncan has stated, "While such programs [like WGU] are now the exception, I want them to be the norm.". Following WGU's approach, other universities have added their own competency based degree programs. These include University of Massachusetts Global (part of the University of Massachusetts system), Purdue University Global Campus (part of the Purdue University System), University of Wisconsin System. and Walden University's Tempo Learning Programs.

All aspects of learning (with the exception of demonstration teaching for teacher licensure programs and clinical experiences in the pre-licensure program for nurses) are completed entirely online. The university states that "learning resources come in a variety of forms, including textbooks, web-based tutorials, simulations, [and] online classes." The university provides all course materials and (online) textbooks through licensing agreements with major commercial providers such as Pearson and McGraw-Hill.

==== Assessments ====
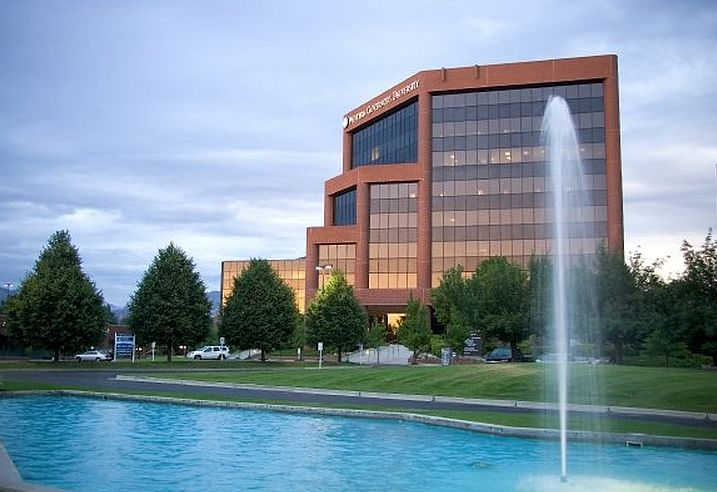
Western Governors University Administration Building in May 2013

The university assesses students using performance-based and objective assessments.

Performance-based assessments are normally completed by submitting written assignments. Submissions are checked for academic integrity using the online plagiarism checker Unicheck by comparing them to a database of other documents submitted to WGU and other universities and other resources available online. Students are graded on their level of competency by comparing the submitted work to a rubric which describes the standards that the submitted work must meet. A student can only pass a performance-based assessment by achieving a "competent" score on each rubric point.

Objective assessments usually consist of exams created by the university which contain multiple-choice, multiple-answer, true-false and/or matching questions. Exams are taken online and are monitored by an online proctoring service such as ProctorU or Examity using a university-approved webcam and screen sharing software. Some objective assessments require students to obtain a professional certification, many of which require students to attend a commercial testing center such as Pearson VUE to complete the relevant exam(s). University-created exams can only be passed by achieving a minimum overall grade that demonstrates competency in the course, while professional certification exams have their own grading methodology and passing score set by their governing body.

There are no open-book or un-proctored exams.

=== Admissions ===
WGU has a multi-step admissions process. Admissions requirements differ depending on which academic program the student chooses to attend.

==== Graduate admissions ====
To qualify for the general graduate admission requirement the applicant must have earned a bachelor's degree from an accredited institution and complete an interview with the enrollment office. Each of the four Schools also have their own specific admission requirements as well.

==== Undergraduate admissions ====
Many programs require either an associate degree from an accredited college, significant previous college credits, or in some cases a significant amount of related, verifiable work experience in the field in which a student wishes to study. The school does not require SAT or ACT scores for undergraduate admission. Undergraduate programs require the student to possess a high school diploma or GED and pass the school's Collegiate Readiness Assessment, and admission into all programs requires an interview with a WGU enrollment counselor to determine whether the competency-based approach is appropriate for the student.

=== Historical enrollment ===
| Enrollment by Year | Total Students |
|---|---|
| 2021 | 150,116 |
| 2020 | 147,866 |
| 2019 | 119,618 |
| 2018 | 110,534 |
| 2017 | 91,436 |
| 2016 | 76,722 |
| 2015 | 63,964 |
| 2014 | 53,853 |
| 2013 | 43,421 |

=== Graduation rate ===
The U.S. Department of Education College Scorecard listed the graduation rate at WGU as 54% as of 2022. The internally-tracked graduation rate for undergraduate students as reported by the university was 50%.

Ethnic composition of student body
| | Student Body | U.S. Census |
|---|---|---|
| African American | 11.8% | 13.3% |
| Asian American | 4.5% | 5.7% |
| Hispanic American(of any race) | 6.3% | 17.8% |
| Unknown | 3.1% | N/A |
| Two or more races | 2.6% | 2.6% |
| Native American | 0.6% | 0.2% |
| Non-Hispanic White | 70.6% | 61.3% |

=== Student demographics ===
WGU students are 65% female, 35% male, and have a median age of 33.

=== Faculty ===
WGU's faculty consists of program mentors (faculty members who advise and guide a student throughout the entire degree program), course instructors (subject-matter experts who advise, tutor, and guide students through specific courses), program faculty (who oversee course content), and evaluation faculty (who evaluate/grade assignments). The university has more than 2,000 faculty members, most of whom work full-time (the exception being part-time assessment evaluators).

According to the U.S. Department of Education's College Navigator, WGU's student-to-faculty ratio is 41:1.

=== Academic integrity ===
Some Western Governors University courses require students to take exams remotely with an online proctor viewing the student as they complete the examination at home or their own chosen location. Online proctors verify test-taker identity and monitor to prevent cheating using a variety of methods, including live viewing, record-and-review, and automated proctoring. Online proctoring services for WGU offers identity verification services and assessment monitoring.

Some of the courses require assignments to be completed using the Taskstream software package and the Turnitin service to check assignments for plagiarism.

=== Career placement ===
The WGU Career and Professional Development Center offers student resources, individual support, and a job board. Its mission is to assist students and alumni who are seeking career development, career experiences, and employment opportunities. These services involve assisting students and alumni to get job interviews, career planning, assistance in applying to graduate and professional schools, and internship placements. The Career and Professional Development Center offers workshops, information sessions, virtual career fairs, and advisement on future career options. Staff also counsel students and alumni regarding resumes and portfolios, interviewing tactics, cover letters, job strategies, and other potential leads for finding employment in the corporate, academic and government sectors.

=== Mascot ===
Sage the Night Owl has been the school's official mascot since 2011.

== Tuition ==
As of 2025, WGU's average yearly tuition was $8,300 for undergraduate programs and $8,856 for graduate programs. Tuition is charged at a flat rate per six-month term, regardless of the number of courses taken or credits completed. In 2020, WGU awarded 14,743 scholarships valued at just under $20 million.

Tuition for a nursing program has been stable (including resource and program fees), declining in real terms, over the period 2008–2022.

== Notable alumni ==
WGU alumni occupy prominent positions across various professional fields, particularly in government, public administration, and military leadership. The group also includes individuals with notable achievements in elite sport, including Olympians, as well as contributors to the arts, media, and cultural production. Collectively, these alumni demonstrate the university's influence across diverse sectors and the tangible civic and professional impact of its academic credentialing.

== Affiliates ==
| Affiliate | Year founded |
|---|---|
| WGU Indiana | 2010 |
| WGU Washington | 2011 |
| WGU Texas | 2011 |
| WGU Missouri | 2013 |
| WGU Tennessee | 2013 |
| WGU Nevada | 2015 |
| WGU North Carolina | 2017 |
| WGU Ohio | 2018 |
| WGU Idaho | 2021 |
| WGU Utah | 2021 |
| WGU Montana | 2021 |
| WGU Nebraska | 2022 |
| WGU Arizona | 2023 |
| WGU Colorado | 2023 |

Several states have affiliated online schools. Though state funding in some instances was used for the creation, each school is self-supporting through tuition and donations and overseen by the WGU board along with a local state chancellor and advisory board. The online campuses WGU offshoots offer the same programs and curricula as the national WGU student body receives, and accreditation is through WGU.

=== WGU Indiana ===
WGU Indiana is WGU's first satellite school, created on June 11, 2010, by executive order of then-governor Mitch Daniels. At its founding, Daniels stated "Today we mark the beginning of, in a real sense, Indiana's eighth state university". With this partnership, WGU Indiana is approved for Indiana state grants and scholarships offered through the State Student Assistance Commission of Indiana (SSACI). Students graduating from Ivy Tech, the state's community college system, can take advantage of an articulation agreement which allows them to transfer all credits, waive the application fee, and receive a 5% discount on tuition. The school is based in Indianapolis. Alison Bell was named the school's chancellor in March 2019.

=== WGU Washington ===
WGU Washington was created in April 2011, with the passing of House Bill 1822. It was signed into law by Governor Christine Gregoire. Former Washington State governor Mike Lowry was one of the founding governors of the university. A bill passed in April 2013 made students eligible for state grants like in-state schools. A transfer agreement allows students who graduate from state community Schools to receive a 5% discount. The founding Washington chancellor was former Bellevue College president Jean Floten. Floten retired in 2017. Richard Cummins, who was president of Columbia Basin College, served as chancellor for a year before retiring in April 2017. On April 26, 2018, Tonya Drake became the chancellor of WGU Washington.

=== WGU Texas ===
Governor Rick Perry of Texas announced the creation of WGU Texas in August 2011 with the signing of Executive Order RP 75. Perry's predecessor George W. Bush was a founding governor of the university. The creation was supported by Rep. Dan Branch, Republican leader of the House Education Committee and Sen. Judith Zaffirini, Democratic Chair of the Senate Education Committee. It called for the Texas Higher Education Coordinating Board, Texas Education Agency and Texas Workforce Commission to help with its founding. The school has an advisory board appointed by the governor and is based in Austin. Darrin Rankin is the current Texas chancellor.

=== WGU Missouri ===
Governor Jay Nixon first announced the creation of WGU Missouri in his annual State of the State address in January 2013. He signed Executive Order 13-04 officially starting the new school. He stated "(Missouri) has great opportunities for higher education, and I'm proud to say we've just added one more. WGU Missouri." It was created using funds from Federal Community Development Block Grants and a grant from the Bill and Melinda Gates Foundation. The school has an advisory board and its own local chancellor, Angela (Angie) Besendorfer. Students are eligible for state grants. It is based in Jefferson City.

=== WGU Tennessee ===
Governor Bill Haslam announced the creation of WGU Tennessee in January 2013. The initiative was part of his "Drive for 55" plan to bring the college graduation rate of the state up to 55%. The school was started with a grant from the Bill and Melinda Gates Foundation and $5 million in one-time state funds. Students are eligible for state financial aid. The school, based in Franklin, has a local chancellor, Kimberly K. Estep, and advisory board.

=== WGU Nevada ===
Governor Brian Sandoval created WGU Nevada by proclamation and a memorandum of understanding with WGU, launching the sixth WGU online campus on June 16, 2015. It was created with a $2 million grant from United Student Aid Funds and required no startup funding from the state. At the time of the launch, WGU had more than 900 students and more than 850 alumni in Nevada. Spencer Stewart was named chancellor of WGU Nevada.

=== WGU North Carolina ===
North Carolina Lieutenant Governor Dan Forest announced WGU North Carolina along with WGU president Scott Pulsipher, launching the seventh WGU online campus on October 5, 2017. The establishment of WGU North Carolina was authorized by the North Carolina General Assembly and the Governor in October 2015. The state appropriated $2 million and the university raised $5 million from committed contributions by Strada Education Network, Golden LEAF Foundation, and Dell Loy Hansen, a private donor. Ben Coulter was appointed chancellor of WGU North Carolina on April 19, 2021.

=== WGU Ohio ===
The Ohio General Assembly authorized the state of Ohio to partner with WGU, and the authorization was signed by Governor John Kasich on June 30, 2017. WGU Ohio is the latest satellite school to open, created on June 21, 2018. The agreement to start the satellite school was agreed upon by Scott Pulsipher, the Western Governors University president and the chancellor of the University System of Ohio John Carey. K.L. Allen was appointed WGU Ohio chancellor on May 4, 2020.
