= List of Department of Education appointments by Joe Biden =

Below is a list of nominations and appointments to the Department of Education by Joe Biden, the 46th president of the United States. As of September 9, 2024, according to tracking by The Washington Post and Partnership for Public Service, 12 nominees have been confirmed, 1 nominee is being considered by the Senate, 3 positions do not have nominees, and 1 appointment has been made that does not require Senate confirmation.

== Color key ==
Denotes appointees awaiting Senate confirmation.

Denotes appointees serving in an acting capacity.

Denotes appointees who have left office or offices which have been disbanded.

== Leadership ==
Office	Nominee	Assumed office	Left office
— Secretary of Education	Miguel Cardona	March 2, 2021 (Confirmed March 1, 2021, 64–33)	—
— Deputy Secretary of Education	Cindy Marten	May 18, 2021 (Confirmed May 11, 2021, 54–44)	—
— Under Secretary of Education	James Kvaal	September 22, 2021 (Confirmed September 14, 2021, 58–37)	—

== Office of the Secretary ==
Office	Nominee	Assumed office	Left office
— General Counsel	Lisa Brown	October 8, 2021 (Confirmed October 6, 2021 by voice vote)	—
— Assistant Secretary of Education (Civil Rights)	Catherine Lhamon	November 17, 2021 (Confirmed October 20, 2021, 51–50); *Vice President Harris cast tie-breaking vote*	—
— Assistant Secretary of Education (Legislation and Congressional Affairs)	Gwen Graham	October 8, 2021 (Confirmed October 6, 2021 by voice vote)	—
— Assistant Secretary of Education (Planning, Evaluation, and Policy Development)	Roberto Rodriguez	October 8, 2021 (Confirmed October 6, 2021 by voice vote)	—
— Inspector General of Education	Sandra Bruce	January 26, 2022 (Confirmed December 2, 2021 by voice vote)	—

== Office of the Deputy Secretary ==
Office	Nominee	Assumed office	Left office
— Assistant Secretary of Education (Special Education and Rehabilitative Services)	Glenna Gallo	May 15, 2023 (Confirmed May 10, 2023, 52–44)	—
Rehabilitation Services Administration
— Commissioner of the Rehabilitation Services Administration	Danté Quintin Allen	December 2023 (Confirmed December 6, 2023 by voice vote)	—

== Office of the Under Secretary ==
Office	Nominee	Assumed office	Left office
— Assistant Secretary of Education (Career, Technical, and Adult Education)	Amy Loyd	June 10, 2022 (Confirmed June 8, 2022, 57–42)	—
— Assistant Secretary of Education (Postsecondary Education)	Nasser Paydar	August 12, 2022 (Confirmed August 4, 2022 by voice vote)	—
Federal Student Aid
— Chief Operating Officer of Federal Student Aid	Richard Cordray	May 3, 2021	July 2024

== Withdrawn nominations ==
Office	Appointee	Announced	Withdrawn	Notes
— Assistant Secretary of Education (Communications and Outreach)	LaWanda Toney	December 15, 2021	January 3, 2024	Nomination not resent
— Director of the Institute of Education Sciences	Adam Gamoran	September 9, 2024	January 3, 2025	Nomination not resent

== See also ==
- Cabinet of Joe Biden, for the vetting process undergone by top-level roles including advice and consent by the Senate
- List of executive branch 'czars' e.g. Special Advisor to the President

== Notes ==
Confirmation votes

Confirmations by roll call vote

Confirmations by voice vote
