= Rehabilitation Services Administration =

U.S. government agency

Agency overview
- Formed: 1973
- Jurisdiction: United States Government
- Headquarters: 400 Maryland Ave., SW Washington, D.C.
- Agency executives: Danté Allen, Commissioner; Carol Doback, Deputy Commissioner
- Parent department: Education
- Parent agency: Office of Special Education and Rehabilitative Services
- Website: rsa.ed.gov

The Rehabilitation Services Administration (RSA) is a federal agency under the United States Department of Education, Office of Special Education and Rehabilitative Services, and is headquartered within the Department of Education in Washington, D.C. It was established to administer portions of the Rehabilitation Act of 1973. Its mission is to provide leadership and resources to assist state and other agencies in providing vocational rehabilitation (VR) and other services to individuals with disabilities to maximize their employment, independence and integration into the community and the competitive labor market.

RSA is charged with: administering formula and discretionary grant programs authorized by Congress; evaluating, monitoring, and reporting on the implementation of Federal policy and programs and the effectiveness of vocational rehabilitation, supported employment, and other related programs for individuals with disabilities; coordinating with other Federal agencies, State agencies, and the private sector including professional organizations, service providers, and organizations of persons with disabilities for the review of program planning, implementation, and monitoring issues.

RSA provides national leadership for, and administration of: basic state and formula grant programs—including grants to state vocational rehabilitation agencies --, rehabilitation training discretionary grant programs, Randolph–Sheppard Act vending facilities, and Helen Keller National Center (CITE) programs.

The grant programs under the RSA's purview are in various areas such as technical assistance centers, demonstration projects, training, client advocacy, and underserved populations. The largest program the RSA manages is the State Vocational Rehabilitation Services Program, which mainly assists in engage in gainful employment. If a state is unable to serve all disabled individuals, priority is given to individuals with the most significant disabilities.

== History ==
Prior to the establishment of the RSA, the passage of legislation played a key role in laying the groundwork for the federal and state partnership. The Smith-Hughes Act in 1917 helped to establish the Federal Board for Vocational Education, which would later regulate the veteran and civilian vocational rehabilitation programs. Coinciding with World War I, The Federal Board for Vocational Education oversaw a vocational rehabilitation program for disabled veterans under the Soldier's Rehabilitation Act of 1918. In 1920, the Smith-Fess Act (the Civilian Vocational Rehabilitation Act) expanded the purview of the Federal Board for Vocational Rehabilitation to oversee a civilian vocational rehabilitation program to be funded on a 50-50 matching basis with the states. Congress would need to periodically vote to extend funding because it was not permanent at this time.

The Randolph–Sheppard Act in 1936 and the Wagner-O'Day Act in 1938 helped to prioritize employment of visually impaired individuals to operate vending stands in federal buildings, and required federal agencies to buy certain products from nonprofit organizations that employed people who are blind, respectively. These acts gave way to the establishment of the National Industries for the Blind. The National Industries for the Blind employed blind Americans who made and sold products under the business name Skilcraft.

== Vocational Rehabilitation Act Amendments ==
In 1954, Public Law 565 increased the 50-50 matched funding from the federal government to 3 federal dollars for every 2 state dollars, and expanded services to those with intellectual disabilities. The Act authorized grants for research and educational training for rehabilitation counselors-to-be in universities. As the Director of the U.S. Office of Vocational Rehabilitation, Mary Switzer released funds for more than 100 university-based rehabilitation-related programs and was a strong advocate for improving quality of life for people with disabilities.

In 1965, Public Law 89-333 expanded federal funding to a 75-25 ratio. It also removed economic need as a requirement for services.

In 1972 the first versions of the Rehabilitation Act were passed by Congress, but vetoed by President Richard Nixon - once in October 1972 and then again in March 1973. President Nixon eventually signed the bill, called the Rehabilitation Act of 1973, and sponsored by Representative John Brademas, into law on September 26, 1973. One of the key pieces in the law is Section 504 of the Rehabilitation Act that says “no otherwise qualified handicapped individual in the United States shall solely on the basis of his handicap, be excluded from the participation, be denied the benefits of, or be subjected to discrimination under any program or activity receiving federal financial assistance.” This means that any organization or program that receives federal funding cannot discriminate against disabled individuals. One of the main purposes of the Act is to provide a statutory basis for the Rehabilitation Services Administration, who helps to develop and maintain federal regulations for individuals with disabilities and their families to help them find jobs and live independently. The RSA is the main agency responsible for carrying out Titles I (Vocational Rehabilitation Services), III (Professional Development and Special Projects and Demonstrations ), VI (Employment Opportunities for Individuals with Disabilities) and VII (Independent Living Services and Centers for Independent Living), as well as specified portions of Title V (Rights and Advocacy) of the Rehabilitation Act.

The Rehabilitation Act continued to evolve; in 1986, Public Law 99-506 helped it to refine and focus services offered to those with the most severe disabilities. Supported employment was also defined as a “legitimate rehabilitation outcome”. Section 504 of the Rehabilitation Act of 1973 helped to influence additional legislation like the Americans with Disabilities Act of 1990. In 1998, the Workforce Investment Act (WIA) impacted programs like the RSA, and according to RSA's website, was intended to strengthen and improve the nation's public workforce development system and help Americans with significant barriers to employment, including individuals with disabilities, into high quality jobs and careers and help employers hire and retain skilled workers. In 2014, the Workforce Innovation & Opportunity Act (WIOA) was signed into law and amended the Rehabilitation Act of 1973. Additionally, WIOA also introduced Pre-Employment Transition Services for high school youth, aged 14–21, to teach 5 cores services. These services are: Job Exploration Counseling, Counseling on Post Secondary Educational Opportunities, Self Advocacy, Workplace Readiness and Work based Learning Experiences. Title IV of WIOA amended title I of the Rehabilitation Act of 1973. Under the WIOA, the Governor of each State or Territory must submit a Unified or Combined State Plan to the U.S. Department of Labor that outlines a four-year strategy for the State's workforce development system. Each state's four-year plan is available on the RSA's website and requires many governmental agencies to work together to review and approve the states’ plans.

== Publications ==
- Annual Reports 1999-2013
- RSA Annual Review Reports on state performance 2010-2015
- RSA Emerging Practices
- Evaluation Standards and Performance Indicators for the Vocational Rehabilitation Services Program
- RSA Functional Limitations of Vocational Rehabilitation (VR) Consumers -- Final Report
- RSA Longitudinal Study of the Vocational Rehabilitation Services Program
- RSA Monitoring of the Vocational Rehabilitation Program -- Required under Section 107
- RSA VR Research in Brief
- RSA Wall Chart of State Vocational Rehabilitation Performance
- RSA Evaluation Studies
- RSA Supporting Information for the RSA-911 Data

== See also ==
- Timeline of disability rights in the United States
- Disability in the United States
- Rehabilitation counseling
