= 2020 United States census =

24th United States national census

Twenty-fourth census of the United States
- April 1, 2020
- Seal of the U.S. Census Bureau

General information
- Country: United States
- Topics: Census topics: People and population; Race and ethnicity; Families and living arrangements; Business and economy; Employment; Housing; Income and poverty
- Authority: U.S. Census Bureau
- Website: www.census.gov

Results
- Total population: 331,449,281 (▲7.4%)
- Most populous state: California (39,538,223)
- Least populous state: Wyoming (576,851)

The 2020 United States census was the 24th decennial United States census. Census Day, the reference day used for the census, was April 1, 2020. Other than a pilot study during the 2000 census, this was the first U.S. census to offer options to respond online or by phone, in addition to the paper response form used for previous censuses.

The census was taken during the COVID-19 pandemic, which affected its administration. The census recorded a resident population of 331,449,281 in the 50 states and the national capital of Washington, D.C., reflecting an increase of 7.4%, or 22,703,743, over the 2010 census. The growth rate was the second-lowest ever recorded, and the net increase was the sixth-highest in history. This was the first census where the ten most-populous states each surpassed ten million residents, and the first census where the ten most-populous cities each surpassed one million residents.

This census's data determined the electoral votes' distribution for the 2024 United States presidential election. A subsequent review by the Census Bureau found significant miscounts in several minority populations and in several states.

== Background ==
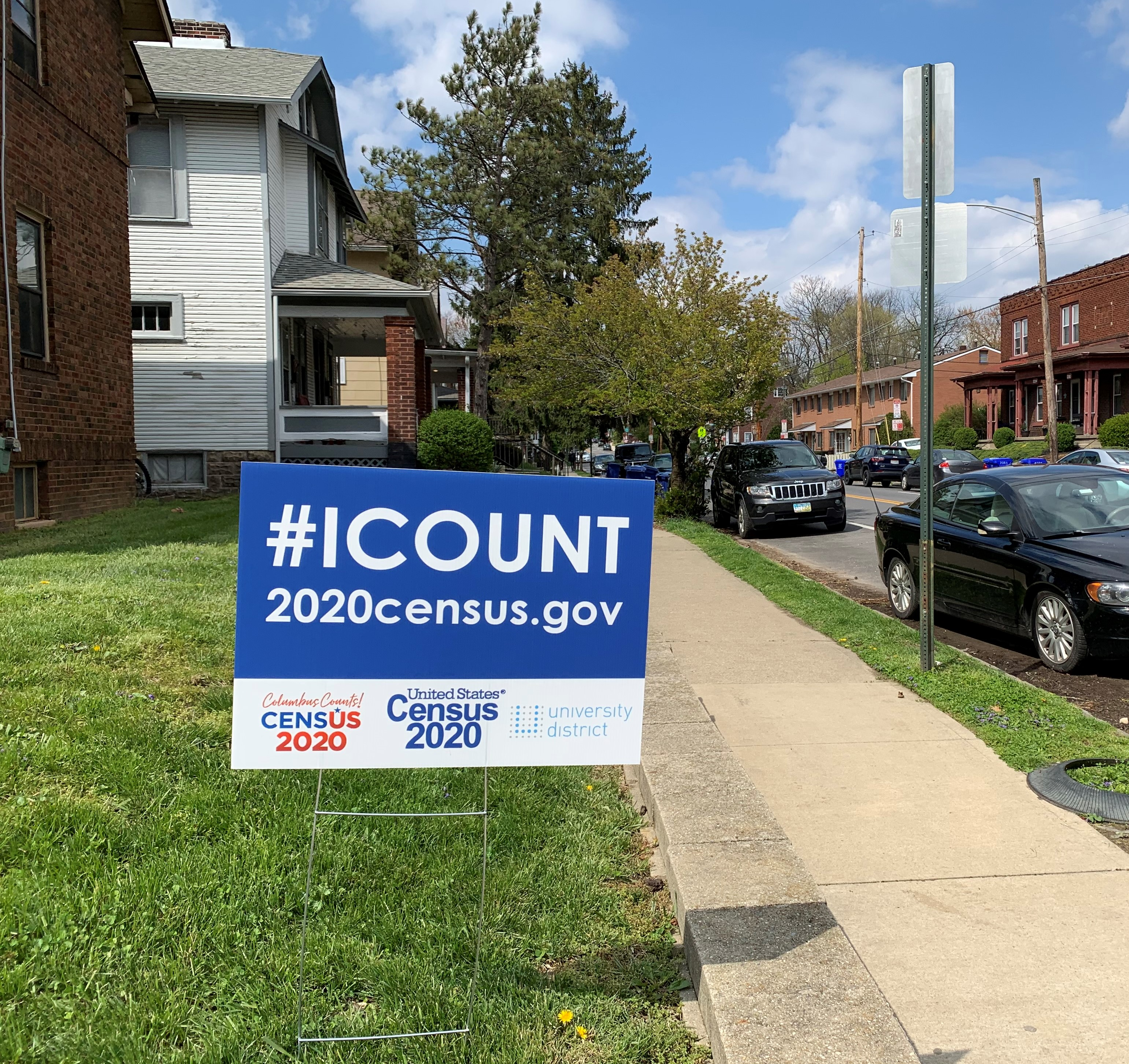
A 2020 U.S. census yard sign in Columbus, Ohio

As required by the United States Constitution, the U.S. census has been conducted every 10 years since 1790. The 2010 United States census was the previous census completed. All people in the U.S. 18 and older are legally obligated to answer census questions, and to do so truthfully (Title 13 of the United States Code). Personally identifiable information is private and the Census Bureau itself will never release it. However, the National Archives and Records Administration could release the original census returns in 2092, if the 72-year rule is not changed before then.

On census reference day, April 1, 2020, the resident United States population (50 states and Washington, D.C., excluding overseas territories and military members and civilian U.S. citizens living abroad) was projected to be 329.59 million, a 6.76% increase from the 2010 census.

== Purpose ==
=== Reapportionment ===
Allocation of U.S. congressional districts following the 2020 census

The results of the 2020 census determine the number of seats for each state in the House of Representatives, hence also the number of electors for each state in the Electoral College, for elections from 2022 to 2032.

The Census Bureau announced the apportionment figures on April 26, 2021. 13 states had changes in congressional seats:

- California, Illinois, Michigan, New York, Ohio, Pennsylvania, and West Virginia lost one seat.
- Colorado, Florida, Montana, North Carolina, and Oregon gained one seat.
- Texas gained two seats.

This represented a smaller number of seats shifting than was forecast by independent analysts.

=== Redistricting ===
State and local officials use censuses to redraw boundaries for districts such as congressional districts (redistricting), state legislative districts, and school districts.

=== Federal funding distribution ===
Dozens of federal programs use census data to help direct funding to state and local areas. Census results help determine how more than $675 billion in federal funding are allocated to states and communities each year for roads, schools, hospitals (health clinics), emergency services, and more.

== Major design changes ==
The 2020 census was the first U.S. census to offer a full internet response option and the first to extensively use technology instead of paper to manage and conduct fieldwork.

Key design changes included:

- Three response options: Internet, paper, and phone. Ultimately, every household that did not respond online was sent a paper form. Households in areas with low internet access received a paper form from the start.
- Multiple languages: In addition to English, respondents were able to complete the census in 12 other languages online or by phone; in addition, language guides, language glossaries, and language identification cards were provided in 59 non-English languages.
- In-office address canvassing: In the 2010 and earlier censuses, census workers walked every street in the United States to verify addresses on the ground. The 2020 census used satellite imagery and GPS to identify areas where housing had changed and assigned workers to verify those addresses in person.
- Digital case management: Census takers used secure iPhone 8 smartphones to receive daily assignments, navigate to interviews, communicate with supervisors, and submit timesheets. Special software was designed to optimize assignments, streamline management, flag issues immediately, and reduce unnecessary follow-up visits.
- Streamlined follow-up visits using existing data sources: The 2020 census used existing government and third-party data to identify vacant households, to predict the best time of day to visit a particular household, and to count and provide characteristics for the people in the household after multiple attempts using existing high-quality data from trusted sources.

== Questions and data uses ==
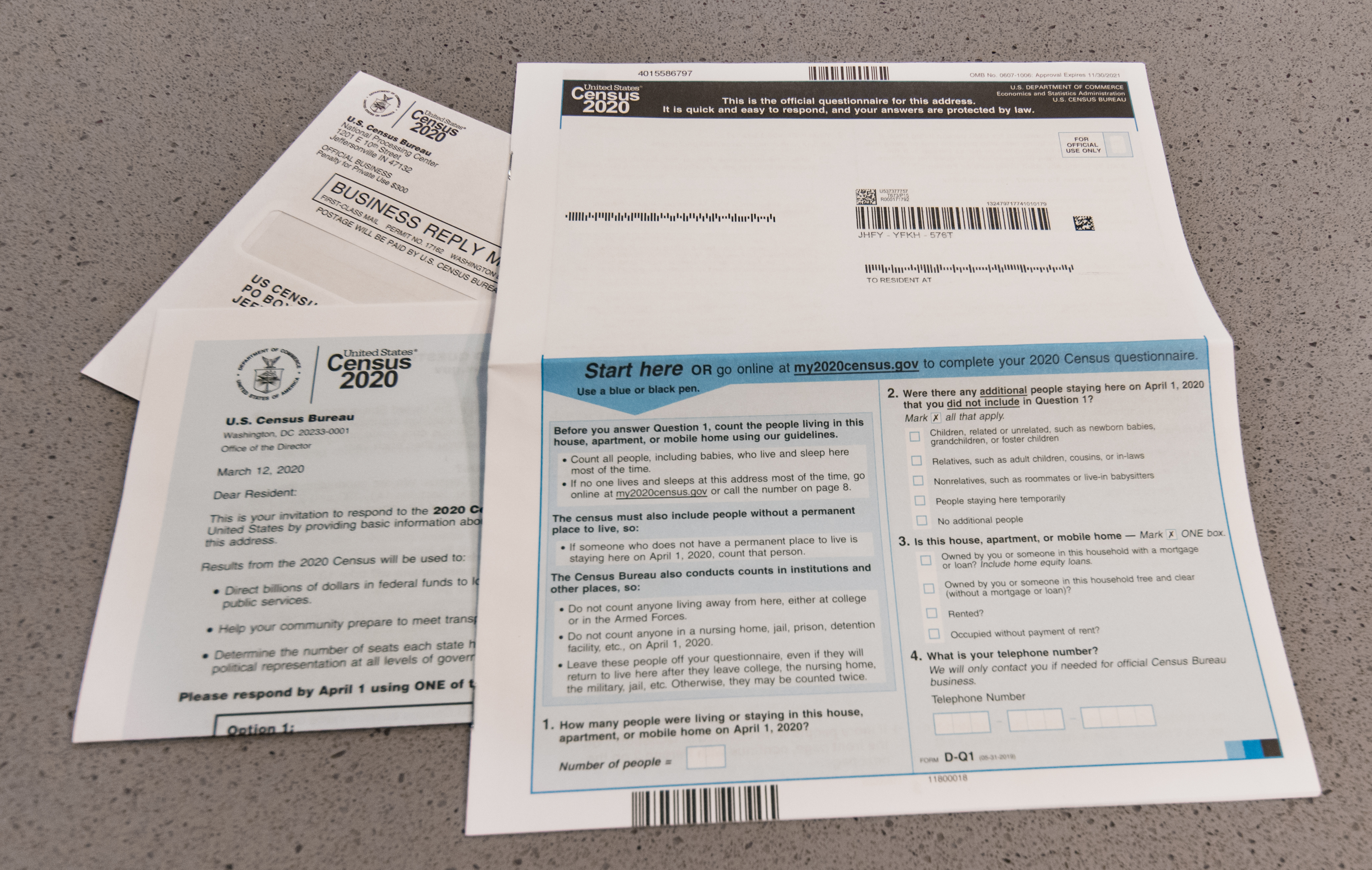
Copies of the 2020 census questionnaire

As required by the Census Act, the U.S. Census Bureau submitted a list of questions to Congress on March 29, 2018. The U.S. census will not share any participant's information with any government agency, as it is prohibited by Title 13 United States code. It has been challenged, but the Supreme Court has always prevailed in reference to Title 13 to protect the confidentiality and privacy of information provided. Based on those questions and a subsequent executive order, the 2020 census asked:

1. The number of people living or staying at the respondent's home on April 1, 2020.
  Used for the total count and to ensure everyone is counted once, only once, and in the right place according to where they live on Census Day.
2. Whether the home is owned or rented.
  Used to produce statistics about homeownership and renters for economic indicators, housing programs and informing planning decisions.
3. The sex of each person in the household.
  Used to produce statistics used to plan and fund government programs, enforce laws, regulations, and policies against discrimination.
4. The age of each person in the household.
  Used to better understand the size and characteristics of different age groups. Agencies use these data to plan and fund government programs that support specific age groups, including children and older populations.
5. The race of each person in the household.
  Used by federal agencies to monitor compliance with anti-discrimination provisions, such as those under the Voting Rights Act and the Civil Rights Act.
6. Whether a person in the household is of Hispanic, Latino, or Spanish origin.
  Used by federal agencies to monitor compliance with anti-discrimination provisions, such as those under the Voting Rights Act and the Civil Rights Act.
7. The relationship of each person in the household to each other.
  Used to plan and fund government programs that support families, including people raising children alone and other households who qualify for additional assistance.

The United States Census Bureau proposed but then withdrew plans to add a new category to classify Middle Eastern and North African peoples, over a dispute over whether this classification should be considered a white ethnicity or a separate race.

== Timeline ==
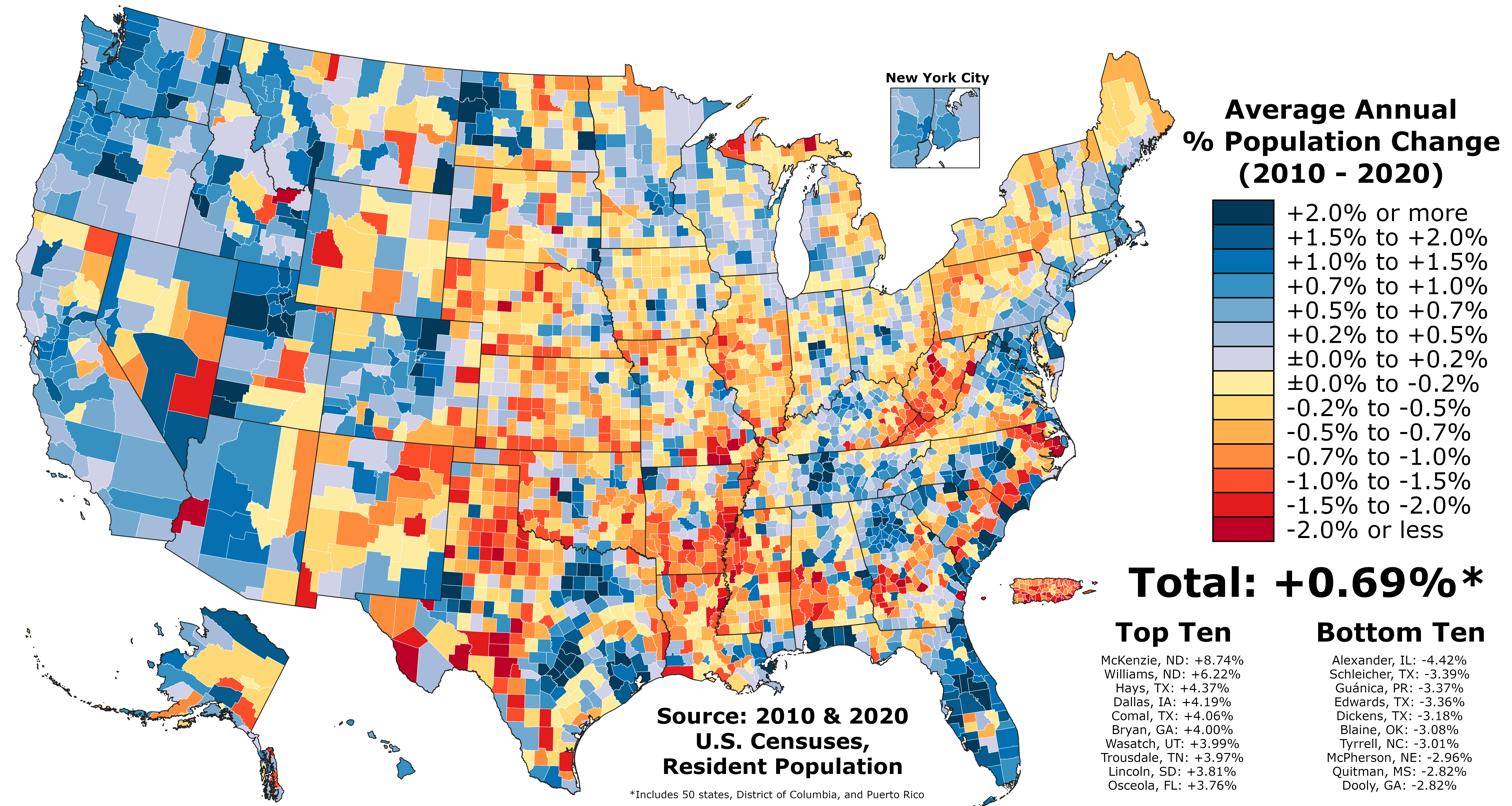
Average annual population growth rate in each county of the 50 states, Washington, D.C., and Puerto Rico between 2010 and 2020, according to the U.S. Census Bureau

- January–March 2019: The U.S. Census Bureau opens 39 area census offices.
- June–September 2019: The Census Bureau opens the remaining 209 area census offices. The offices support and manage the census takers who work all over the country to conduct the census.
- August 2019: The Census Bureau conducts the in-field address canvassing operation. Census takers visit areas that have added or lost housing in recent years to ensure the Bureau's address list is up to date. The 2020 census was the first modern census that did not verify every address, in person, on the ground. Instead, satellite imagery, U.S. Postal Service, and other current records were used to verify most addresses and to highlight areas where census workers needed to verify in-person.
- January 21, 2020: The Census Bureau begins counting the population in remote Alaska, with Toksook Bay being the first town to be enumerated.
- April 1, 2020: Census Day is observed nationwide. By this date, households received an invitation to participate in the 2020 census. There are three options for responding: online, by mail, or by phone.
- April 2020: Census takers begin following up with households around selected colleges and universities. Census takers also begin conducting quality check interviews (delayed).
- May 2020: The Census Bureau begins following up with households who have not responded (NRFU [Nonresponse Followup] delayed to August 11 – October 31). In August 2020, the 3-month NRFU enumeration period was compressed to two 1/2 months, ending October 15, 2020.
- September 23–24: People experiencing homelessness counted by officials who visited shelters, at soup kitchens and mobile food vans, and non-sheltered, outdoor locations such as tent encampments.
- October 15: Self-response data collection ends with over 99.9% of households having self-responded or been counted by census takers.
- October 16, 2020: The count ends.
- December 31, 2020: The Census Bureau delivers apportionment counts to the U.S. president. (This had been delayed to April 30, 2021).
- April 1, 2021: The Census Bureau sends redistricting counts to the states. This information is used to redraw legislative districts based on population changes. (This had been delayed to no earlier than September 30, 2021).
- April 26, 2021: Population results were released for the country as a whole and each state.
- August 12, 2021: The Census Bureau began releasing data by race, ethnicity, sex, and age, as well as population numbers for counties, cities, towns and other smaller areas.
- May 25, 2023: Demographic and housing data about local communities (DHC).
- August 31, 2023: Congressional district summary files were released.
- September 21, 2023: File A of detailed demographic and housing data was released.
- August 1, 2024: File B of detailed demographic and housing data was released.

== Response rates ==
According to the Census Bureau, 60.0% of all U.S. households had submitted their census questionnaire by May 22, 2020 –either online, by mail or by phone. Most U.S. households were mailed an invitation letter between March 12–20 to self-respond. They account for more than 95% of all U.S. households. Prior to the ongoing coronavirus pandemic, the remaining 5% of U.S. households (mostly in rural areas) were supposed to be visited by census takers in April/May, dropping off invitation letters to owners. This was delayed, but most census offices restarted work again in mid-May. By July 14, 2020, the self-response rate was 62.1% or 91,800,000 households. The self-response rate was 66.5% in 2010 and 67.4% in 2000.

In an update published October 19, 2020, the Census Bureau stated 99.98% of addresses had been accounted for, with all but one state over a 99.9% rate. Paper responses postmarked on or before October 15 would be processed, as long as they arrived at the processing center by October 22.

== Marketing and partnerships ==
As in previous censuses, the 2020 census relied on a network of trusted voices nationwide to help raise awareness, answer questions, and encourage communities to participate. Hundreds of local "complete count committees" are dedicating resources to the efforts nationwide.

VMLY&R (formerly Young & Rubicam) secured the Integrated Communications Contract for the 2020 census campaign in August 2016. As the contract's primary agency of record, VMLY&R created an integrated team for this project, Team Y&R, which includes subcontractors specializing in minority outreach, digital media, earned media and more.

In March 2019, the campaign unveiled the 2020 census tagline: "Shape your future. START HERE." The tagline was based on research that demonstrated which types of messages will reach and motivate all populations, including segments of the population who are historically hard to count.

== Implementation problems ==
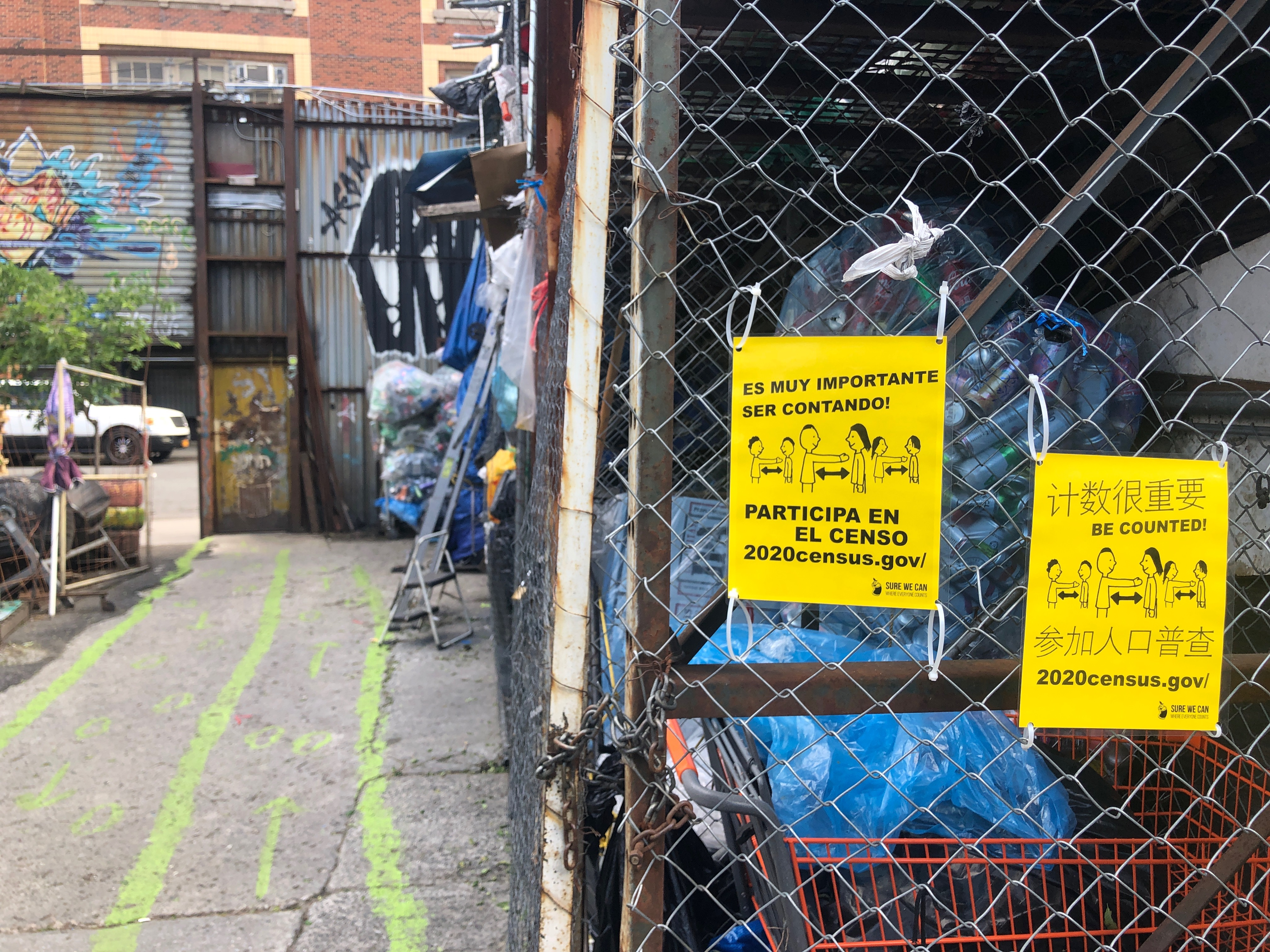
Chinese and Spanish language flyers in Brooklyn promoting the 2020 U.S. census

The printing company Cenveo won the $61 million contract in October 2017 to produce census forms and reminders but went bankrupt less than four months later. The inspector general of the U.S. Government Publishing Office said the agency failed to check the company's financial status and improperly allowed the company to lower its bid after other bids were unsealed.

The coronavirus pandemic caused delays to census field operations and counts of the homeless and people living in group quarters. As of April 1, 2020, Census Day, the Census Bureau still planned to complete the count by the end of the year.

== COVID-19 pandemic emergency ==
On March 18, 2020, the U.S. Census Bureau issued a press release by Director Steven Dillingham announcing that 2020 census field operations would be suspended for two weeks until April 1, 2020, due to the COVID-19 pandemic. On March 27, 2020, the agency announced it would temporarily suspend in-person interviews for its on-going surveys. The agency claimed that staffing adjustments at its call centers due to implementing health guidance had "led to increases in call wait times, affecting different languages at different times". According to its own documentation, the U.S. Census Bureau continued to pay 2020 census employees even though field operations were supposed to be suspended.

On March 28, 2020, the U.S. Census Bureau issued another press release announcing 2020 census field operations would be suspended for an additional two weeks, through April 15, 2020. Census Bureau officials communicated to the media that on March 27, 2020, they learned an employee had tested positive for COVID-19 at the agency's National Processing Center in Jeffersonville, Indiana, which the agency kept open during the suspension, claiming they would "transition to the minimum number of on-site staff necessary to continue operations". The agency announced on April 10, 2020, that it took steps to make "more employees available to respond to requests" at the call centers.

In a joint statement on April 13, 2020, U.S. Department of Commerce secretary Wilbur Ross and U.S. Census Bureau director Steven Dillingham announced further operational adjustments to the 2020 census due to COVID-19 health and safety concerns. In the statement, it was explained that "steps [were] being taken to reactivate field offices beginning June 1, 2020", "in-person activities, including all interaction with the public, enumeration, office work and processing activities, [would] incorporate the most current guidance to promote the health and safety of staff and the public" including "personal protective equipment (PPE) and social distancing practices". This release stated "in order to ensure the completeness and accuracy of the 2020 census, the Census Bureau is seeking statutory relief from Congress of 120 additional calendar days to deliver final apportionment counts" due to the COVID-19 emergency, and that "under this plan, the Census Bureau would extend the window for field data collection and self-response to October 31, 2020, which will allow for apportionment counts to be delivered to the president by April 30, 2021, and redistricting data to be delivered to the states no later than September 30, 2021."

On April 15, 2020, U.S. Census Bureau director Steven Dillingham wrote to Department of Commerce inspector general Peggy E. Gustafson responding to a March 12, 2020, memo sent by the Office of the Inspector General requesting information about the Census Bureau's plans to respond to the COVID-19 emergency by March 20, 2020. The inspector general's memo asked how the Bureau would address staff and enumerator safety. Dillingham's April 15 letter:

The Census Bureau is closely coordinating the acquisition of needed PPE materials for field and office staff through the Department of Commerce's Coronavirus Taskforce. Federal partners include the Department of Homeland Security and the Centers for Disease Control. We have generated and submitted estimates for equipment needs. On April 15, 2020, the Agency's internal task force met and discussed our estimates for needed equipment, potential delivery dates, and budget implications. We continue to monitor the situation and make adjustments as necessary.

To ensure the completeness and accuracy of the 2020 census, the Census Bureau is seeking statutory relief from Congress of 120 additional calendar days to deliver final apportionment counts.

Under this plan, the Census Bureau would extend the window for field data collection and self-response to October 31, 2020, which will allow for apportionment counts to be delivered to the President by April 30, 2021, and redistricting data to be delivered to the states no later than September 30, 2021.

On April 24, 2020, Dillingham and other Census Bureau officials briefed the House Committee on Oversight and Reform on the agency's response to the COVID-19 emergency. This briefing came after many requests from the committee since March 12, 2020, including a last-minute cancellation on April 20, 2020. In the briefing, Albert E. Fontenot Jr., the associate director for decennial census programs, explained that the bureau was planning a "phased start to many of our census operations" rather than beginning field operations nationwide on June 1, 2020, as previously announced and said operations would resume at different times in different areas of the country based on federal, state, and local public health guidance, as well as the availability of personal protective equipment, prioritizing reopening mail processing centers and census offices and said the bureau would notify Congress as it begins to restart operations. However, the National Processing Center and Area Census Offices had remained open.

Starting on May 4, 2020, the U.S. Census Bureau began publishing dates as it claimed to begin a "phased restart of some 2020 census field operations in select geographic areas" and said they had "ordered personal protective equipment (PPE) for all field staff, including those that work in a field office. These materials will be secured and provided to staff prior to restarting operations." Publicly published procurement data shows that an award was signed on April 28, 2020, for non-medical, reusable face masks for area census offices in a $5,001,393.60 contract awarded to Industries for the Blind and Visually Impaired, Inc. Around that time, two contracts for hand sanitizer were awarded to Travis Association for the Blind, one signed on May 9, 2020, in a $57,390.00 contract and the other signed on May 13, 2020, in a $557,251.20 contract, with both contracts listing the place of principal performance as Jeffersonville, Indiana. The agency decided that face shields were necessary to protect employees from COVID-19 exposure, but provided them only to personnel at the headquarters and national processing centers. An OSHA complaint was made from Oklahoma City on May 1, 2020, complaining that employees were not able to practice social distancing and were not provided with adequate personal protective equipment such as gloves and masks, showing the office was open prior to the Census Bureau's published office restart date of May 4, 2020.

Additional "restart" dates starting May 18 were published on May 15, 2020, for other geographic areas in eleven states. An OSHA complaint was recorded that same day from St. Louis, that desks remained close together with no physical dividers, improper sanitation practices were being used, and no remote work for high-risk employees. The published restart date for the St. Louis Area Census Office was May 11, 2020.

On May 21, 2020, procurement information for two contracts was entered into the Federal Procurement Data System. One contract was for $1,502,928.00 awarded to Industries for the Blind and Visually Impaired, Inc. for hand sanitizer, and a contract for $7,053,569.85 for four-ounce (118 ml) hand sanitizers awarded to NewView Oklahoma, Inc. both with the place of principal performance listed as Jeffersonville, Indiana.

May 22, 2020, saw two additional contracts, one was a disinfectant wipes contract for $3,137,533.00 awarded to Industries for the Blind and Visually Impaired, Inc. and the other was a contract for $2,107,000.00 awarded to NewView Oklahoma for blue nitrile gloves, both with a place of principal performance listed as Jeffersonville, Indiana.

A press release on May 22, 2020, announced May 25 "restart" dates for ten more states. An OSHA complaint was made from Concord, California, on April 3, 2020, that there were at least two confirmed cases of COVID-19 unrecorded on OSHA 300 logs and that employees were working in close quarters with no disinfection of shared equipment such as headsets, laptops, and tablets. The published restart date for the Concord, California, Area Census Office was May 25, 2020.

Offices were reopened in the areas of "American Samoa, the Commonwealth of the Northern Mariana Islands, Guam and the U.S. Virgin Islands in preparation for resuming operations for the 2020 Island Areas Censuses" on May 22, 2020.

On May 29, 2020, a press release was published announcing "restart" of operations in seven additional states and the Washington, D.C., area starting from the week of June 1. An OSHA complaint was made from Austin, Texas, on May 27, 2020, complaining that CDC guidelines were not being followed, that employees were unable to practice social distancing, and that employees experiencing flu-like symptoms and positive COVID-19 test results continued to come to work, showing the office was open prior to the Census Bureau's published office restart date of June 1, 2020.

In a June 5, 2020, press release, the U.S. Census Bureau announced additional area census offices (ACOs) would "restart" on June 8, saying that with "these additions, field activities have restarted in 247 of 248 area census offices stateside, all ACOs in Puerto Rico and the island areas, and 98.9% of the nation's update leave workload will have resumed." The June 5 press release was reissued on June 9, 2020, which included the addition of a June 11 "restart" at the Window Rock, Arizona, Area Census Office. Days later, the Navajo Nation began reinstating lockdown restrictions and curfews due to a surge in new cases.

A June 12, 2020, press release shared that the update leave (UL) operation had resumed, as well as fingerprinting of selected applicants. The agency announced that the update enumerate (UE) operation would restart on June 14 "in remote parts of northern Maine and southeast Alaska" where employees update the Census Bureau's address list and interview households for the 2020 census, claiming "all census takers have been trained on social distancing protocols, and will be issued personal protective equipment (PPE) and will follow local guidelines for their use." The June 12 press release also shared that the communications campaign had been adapted due to the pandemic and would continue through October, "the end of 2020 census data collection operations", with additional paid media planned for July, August and September, though a July 15 list of media vendors showed only plans through the end of July.

On August 3, 2020, the Census Bureau announced that field collection would end on September 30, rather than October 31 as planned in April. In a leaked internal document, Census Bureau career officials determined that starting Nonresponse Followup Operations in this Replan would put the health and safety of employees at risk, stating, "These ACOs will have to deploy staff regardless of the COVID-19 risk in those areas to open on these dates." On September 8, 2020, Mark H. Zabarsky, Principal Assistant Inspector General for Audit and Evaluation published an alert on behalf of the Department of Commerce Office of Inspector General, which stated that the number of COVID-19 related safety issues raised by hotline complaints tripled between July 1 and August 21.

== State rankings ==
Population change 2010–2020

Rank/ change		State	Population (2020)	Population (2010)	Change	% change
1	0	California	39,538,223	37,253,956	2,284,267 ▲	6.1% ▲
2	0	Texas	29,145,505	25,145,561	3,999,944 ▲	15.9% ▲
3	1	Florida	21,538,187	18,801,310	2,736,877 ▲	14.6% ▲
4	1	New York	20,201,249	19,378,102	823,147 ▲	4.3% ▲
5	1	Pennsylvania	13,002,700	12,702,379	300,321 ▲	2.4% ▲
6	1	Illinois	12,812,508	12,830,632	−18,124 ▼	−0.1%▼
7	0	Ohio	11,799,448	11,536,504	262,944 ▲	2.3% ▲
8	1	Georgia	10,711,908	9,687,653	1,024,255 ▲	10.6% ▲
9	1	North Carolina	10,439,388	9,535,483	903,905 ▲	9.5% ▲
10	2	Michigan	10,077,331	9,883,640	193,691 ▲	2.0% ▲
11	0	New Jersey	9,288,994	8,791,894	497,100 ▲	5.7% ▲
12	0	Virginia	8,631,393	8,001,024	630,369 ▲	7.9% ▲
13	0	Washington	7,705,281	6,724,540	980,741 ▲	14.6% ▲
14	2	Arizona	7,151,502	6,392,017	759,485 ▲	11.9% ▲
15	1	Massachusetts	7,029,917	6,547,629	482,288 ▲	7.4% ▲
16	1	Tennessee	6,910,840	6,346,105	564,735 ▲	8.9% ▲
17	2	Indiana	6,785,528	6,483,802	301,726 ▲	4.6% ▲
18	1	Maryland	6,177,224	5,773,552	403,672 ▲	7.0% ▲
19	1	Missouri	6,154,913	5,988,927	165,986 ▲	2.8% ▲
20	0	Wisconsin	5,893,718	5,686,986	206,732 ▲	3.6% ▲
21	1	Colorado	5,773,714	5,029,196	744,518 ▲	14.8% ▲
22	1	Minnesota	5,706,494	5,303,925	402,569 ▲	7.6% ▲
23	1	South Carolina	5,118,425	4,625,364	493,061 ▲	10.7% ▲
24	1	Alabama	5,024,279	4,779,736	244,543 ▲	5.1% ▲
25	0	Louisiana	4,657,757	4,533,372	124,385 ▲	2.7% ▲
26	0	Kentucky	4,505,836	4,339,367	166,469 ▲	3.8% ▲
27	0	Oregon	4,237,256	3,831,074	406,182 ▲	10.6% ▲
28	0	Oklahoma	3,959,353	3,751,351	208,002 ▲	5.5% ▲
29	0	Connecticut	3,605,944	3,574,097	31,847 ▲	0.9% ▲
30	4	Utah	3,271,616	2,763,885	507,731 ▲	18.4% ▲
31	1	Iowa	3,190,369	3,046,355	144,014 ▲	4.7% ▲
32	3	Nevada	3,104,614	2,700,551	404,063 ▲	15.0% ▲
33	1	Arkansas	3,011,524	2,915,918	95,606 ▲	3.3% ▲
34	3	Mississippi	2,961,279	2,967,297	−6,018 ▼	−0.2% ▼
35	2	Kansas	2,937,880	2,853,118	84,762 ▲	3.0% ▲
36	0	New Mexico	2,117,522	2,059,179	58,343 ▲	2.8% ▲
37	1	Nebraska	1,961,504	1,826,341	135,163 ▲	7.4% ▲
38	1	Idaho	1,839,106	1,567,582	271,524 ▲	17.3% ▲
39	2	West Virginia	1,793,716	1,852,994	−59,278 ▼	−3.2% ▼
40	0	Hawaii	1,455,271	1,360,301	94,970 ▲	7.0% ▲
41	1	New Hampshire	1,377,529	1,316,470	61,059 ▲	4.6% ▲
42	1	Maine	1,362,359	1,328,361	33,998 ▲	2.6% ▲
43	0	Rhode Island	1,097,379	1,052,567	44,812 ▲	4.3% ▲
44	0	Montana	1,084,225	989,415	94,810 ▲	9.6% ▲
45	0	Delaware	989,948	897,934	92,014 ▲	10.3% ▲
46	0	South Dakota	886,667	814,180	72,487 ▲	8.9% ▲
47	1	North Dakota	779,094	672,591	106,503 ▲	15.8% ▲
48	1	Alaska	733,391	710,231	23,160 ▲	3.3% ▲
—	—	District of Columbia	689,545	601,723	87,822 ▲	14.6% ▲
49	0	Vermont	643,077	625,741	17,336 ▲	2.8% ▲
50	0	Wyoming	576,851	563,626	13,225 ▲	2.4% ▲
		United States	331,449,281	308,745,538	22,703,743 ▲	7.4% ▲

== City rankings ==
City	State	Population	Land Area (mi^{2})	Density (/mi^{2})	Region
New York	New York	8,804,190	300.5	29,303.2	Northeast
Los Angeles	California	3,898,747	469.5	8,304.2	West
Chicago	Illinois	2,746,388	227.7	12,059.8	Midwest
Houston	Texas	2,304,580	640.4	3,598.4	South
Phoenix	Arizona	1,608,139	518.0	3,104.5	West
Philadelphia	Pennsylvania	1,603,797	134.4	11,936.9	Northeast
San Antonio	Texas	1,434,625	498.8	2,875.9	South
San Diego	California	1,386,932	325.9	4,255.9	West
Dallas	Texas	1,304,379	339.6	3,841.1	South
San Jose	California	1,013,240	178.3	5,684.1	West

== Citizenship question debate ==
The U.S. decennial census is used to determine federal funds, grants, and support to states. The Census Bureau had included a citizenship question until 1950 when it was removed, though it continued to include a question asking about place of birth. In a January 2018 memo, an initial evaluation by Census Bureau officials advised against such a question, saying that compiling citizenship data from existing administrative records is more accurate and far less expensive; however, Wilbur Ross, secretary of the United States Department of Commerce which oversees the Census Bureau, decided the administrative approach alone would not be sufficient. The Census Bureau announced in March 2018 its plan to add a question related to citizenship for the 2020 census: "Is this person a citizen of the United States?" For the 2020 census, Ross told Congress the citizenship numbers were necessary to enforce the Voting Rights Act's protection against voting discrimination. Ross was accused by Democrats in Congress of lying that the citizenship question was requested by the Justice Department and approved by him.

Upon the bureau's announcement, several state and city officials criticized the decision, reiterating the concern about discouraging participation from immigrants, resulting in undercounting, and questioning the motives of Secretary Ross in adding the question. Three simultaneous separate federal lawsuits came out of this discovery, occurring at the district courts of New York, Maryland, and California. During the controversy over the census question, the Census Bureau ran a test census in June 2019 on about 480,000 households to determine what effects adding the census question would have on participation, and to prepare the bureau, its staffing, and its counting measurements, to handle the potential lack of responses due to the citizenship question.

During these trials, documents released in May 2019 showed that the late Thomas B. Hofeller, an architect of Republican gerrymandering, had found that adding the census question could help to gerrymander maps that "would be advantageous to Republicans and non-Hispanic whites". Hofeller later wrote the DOJ letter which justified the policy by claiming it was needed to enforce the 1965 Voting Rights Act. Following this discovery, the United States House Committee on Oversight and Reform issued subpoenas for the Department of Justice to provide materials related to the census question and to question both Commerce secretary Wilbur Ross and United States Attorney General William Barr, seeking action to judge if they are in contempt. The Trump administration on June 12, 2019, asserted executive privilege over portions of the requested documents. As a result, the House committee subsequently voted along party lines to hold both Ross and Barr in contempt that day. The full House voted to hold Ross and Barr in contempt on July 17, 2019, in a 230–198 vote along party lines.

=== New York District Court and subsequent Supreme Court case ===
A lawsuit, led by New York state's attorney general Barbara Underwood and joined by seventeen other states, fifteen cities and other civil rights groups, was filed in the United States District Court for the Southern District of New York. During the discovery phase of the trial, new information came to light that Ross had had previous discussions with Steve Bannon before March 2018 with the intent to add the citizenship question, contradicting statements he had made to Congress in March. This led district judge Jesse M. Furman in September 2018 to ask that Ross clear a day in his schedule to give a deposition to the court related to the addition of the census question prior to the planned start of the trial in November.

The Trump administration filed a writ of mandamus to the United States Supreme Court, requesting that they postpone the trial, and also to defer any involvement with Ross until the start of the trial. The Supreme Court issued an order that allowed the trial United States Census Bureau v. State of New York to go forward, but agreed to postpone Ross's deposition until after the start of the trial. The Supreme Court also agreed to treat the writ of mandamus as a writ of petition, and granted certiorari to review the question raised by the government of whether a district court can request deposition of a high-ranking executive branch official on a matter related to a trial before evidence has been presented.

Judge Furman ruled in January 2019 that the addition of the citizenship question to the census was unlawful, saying "the decision to add a citizenship question to the 2020 census – even if it did not violate the Constitution itself – was unlawful for a multitude of independent reasons and must be set aside." The Justice Department filed a petition for writ of certiorari before judgment to have the case directly heard by the Supreme Court and bypass the normal appeal which would have been heard by the Second Circuit, given the pending deadline of June 2019 to publish the census forms. The Supreme Court accepted the petition related to Furman's ruling on February 15, 2019, a separate matter from the question of Ross's deposition, and the case's oral arguments were heard on April 23, 2019.

The Supreme Court issued its decision on June 27, 2019, rejecting the Trump administration's stated rationale for including the question. While the Court majority agreed that the question was allowable under the Enumeration Act, they also agreed with the ability of the District Court to ask Commerce for further explanation for the question under the Administrative Procedure Act (APA). They also agreed that the answers Commerce had provided at the time appeared to be "contrived" and pretextual, leaving open the possibility that Commerce could offer a better rationale. The case was remanded back to the District Court, to allow Commerce to provide a better explanation for the rationale of the question to the District Court, who would deem if that was sufficient before allowing the question on the census. The question would be allowed on the census only if these steps can be completed before the self-imposed form printing deadline. On July 7, the DOJ announced that it was replacing its entire legal team dealing with that question, but on July 9, Furman rejected the DOJ action, saying reasons must be given for the withdrawal of each attorney and that the administration had been insisting for months the question needed to be settled by July 1.

The American Civil Liberties Union (ACLU) has taken steps to introduce the Hofeller evidence into the New York case but it will not be heard until late 2019 after the census forms are to be published.

=== California District Court case ===
The second suit over the census question came in the United States District Court for the Northern District of California under Judge Richard Seeborg, raised by the state of California and several cities within it. In March 2019, Seeborg similarly found as Furman had in New York that the addition of the census question was unconstitutional and issued an injunction to block its use. The government appealed to the Ninth Circuit before the Supreme Court remanded the case.

=== Maryland District Court case ===
A similar question related to the intent of the question was raised by several immigrants-rights groups in the United States District Court for the District of Maryland. The case was overseen by Judge George J. Hazel in the District of Maryland. Hazel had found for the pro-immigration groups in April 2019, ruling that the addition of an immigration question to the census was unconstitutional. The government issued its appeal to the Fourth Circuit Court of Appeals.

The new Hofeller evidence was presented to Hazel as the case was being heard on appeal during June 2019 at the Fourth Circuit. Hazel said the new evidence "raises a substantial issue". On June 25, 2019, the Fourth Circuit remanded the case back to Hazel's District Court with the newly provided evidence, and to review if the additional evidence showed discriminatory intent. Should Hazel find such intent, it would be possible for him to place an injunction on the addition of the census question during a new discovery phase, regardless of the Supreme Court decision in Department of Commerce v. New York. This action would effectively render the question moot since the census forms would need to be published at this point without the citizenship question to meet the mailing deadlines.

=== Subsequent actions ===
President Trump, after the Supreme Court decision in Department of Commerce was announced, stated his intent to find a way to delay the census as long as possible so the judicial matter could be resolved. On July 2, 2019, the Department of Justice (DOJ) announced that the citizenship question would not be included in the census, and the Commerce Department began printing census forms without a citizenship question. However, the next day, Trump insisted his administration was "absolutely moving forward" with the citizenship question, and the Justice Department confirmed in court that it had been instructed to find a legal way to include it in the census.

In response to an order from Judge Hazel, the Justice Department affirmed on July 5, 2019, that it will be seeking a route to add the citizenship question to the census, though at the time did not know which route it would take. Hazel had ordered this response as, if the department was intending to add the question, he could begin determining a schedule in coordination with Judge Furman in the New York court for further proceedings and discovery in both the New York and the Maryland lawsuits. On July 7, the DOJ announced its intention to replace its entire legal team on the case, but Furman allowed the DOJ to dismiss only two of its eleven attorneys, writing in the July 9 rejection that the DOJ had "provide[d] no reasons, let alone 'satisfactory reasons', for the substitution of counsel". Furman pointed out that the case had already run past the DOJ's own previously requested deadline of July 1 and replacing counsel would cause further delays.

Separate from the events in the courts, Trump has said he also considered using an executive order to place the citizenship question on the census. However, on July 11 he issued Executive Order 13880 directing the Department of Commerce to obtain citizenship data from other federal agencies rather than via the census. He added that "we are not backing down in our effort to determine the citizenship status of the United States population" and that data from other federal agencies would be "far more accurate" than a census question. A spokesperson for the Department of Justice said that although the DOJ had agreed with Ross's plan to include the question, "Today's executive order represents an alternative path to collecting the best citizenship data now available, which is vital for informed policymaking and numerous other reasons. Accordingly, the department will promptly inform the courts that the government will not include a citizenship question on the 2020 decennial census." Besides federal agencies, the Department of Commerce is obtaining citizenship data from state records.

Joe Biden, on his first day of his presidency on January 20, 2021, issued an executive order that revoked both Trump's July 11 executive order and Trump's July 21 memo, as to have the census follow the standard practice of including the counts of undocumented immigrants within the final numbers. The order did not rescind a directive for the Census Bureau to use government records to produce block-level citizenship data.

== Apportionment challenges ==
=== Alabama lawsuit ===
While the census question was in litigation, the state of Alabama and one of its congressional representatives, Mo Brooks, filed a lawsuit against the Department of Commerce and the Census Bureau in May 2018 in the United States District Court for the Northern District of Alabama, asserting that the framers of the Constitution never intended for illegal immigrants to be included in the census count or apportionment base. The state believed it would lose a congressional seat to other states that have had increased numbers of immigrants in the last decade. The Mexican American Legal Defense and Educational Fund sought to intervene on behalf of Latino voters, as well as the city of San Jose, California, and Santa Clara County, California, and King County, Washington, arguing that eliminating of illegal immigrants would affect federal funding for their cities and counties. The motion was granted by the end of 2018.

As the census question case continued, the Census Bureau spoke of other means to obtain immigration data, and Barr, referencing the Alabama suit, said that "for example, there is a current dispute over whether illegal aliens can be included for apportionment purposes. Depending on the resolution of that dispute, this data may be relevant to those considerations. We will be studying this issue." Spurred by Barr's comments that the government would not defend itself in the case, a coalition of fifteen states and other groups also moved to intervene, which was granted by September 2019.

=== July 2020 memo ===
On July 21, 2020, President Trump signed a memo to the Department of Commerce, "Memorandum on Excluding Illegal Aliens from the Apportionment Base Following the 2020 Census" with instructions not to include illegal immigrants in the census totals for purposes of apportionment. The memo said the Constitution does not define which "persons" must be included in the apportionment base, and past censuses have excluded some legal immigrants in the country temporarily, justifying the change. Law and census experts said this was an invalid interpretation as past case law has supported inclusion of "whole persons" including illegal immigrants, and the ACLU immediately said they planned to file a lawsuit against the administration over the memo. Common Cause, the city of Atlanta, and other groups and individuals filed the first suit seeking an injunction to prevent the government from executing on the memo a week after it was signed in the United States District Court for the District of Columbia.

On September 10, 2020, a three-judge panel of the United States District Court for the Southern District of New York unanimously rejected the order, ruling that it was so obviously illegal a lawsuit challenging it was unnecessary. Eight days later, the Trump administration filed notice that it would appeal the decision directly to the Supreme Court, bypassing the circuit court appeals process. The Supreme Court accepted the petition on October 16, 2020, and scheduled expedited oral arguments in the case on November 30, 2020. The Court ruled in a per curiam decision on December 18, 2020, that the case was premature due to lack of standing and ripeness but did not rule on any of the constitutional challenges at the time. The decision vacated the District Court's ruling and remanded the case to the District Court to be dismissed.

=== Early completion of count ===
The Trump administration sought to complete the census count earlier than originally scheduled. In September 2020, federal district court judge Lucy Koh issued a preliminary injunction against the plan to end counting on September 30 rather than the scheduled October 31, saying the Commerce Department "never articulated a satisfactory explanation". She also blocked a plan to deliver the count results to the White House by December 31, rather than the original April 2021 delivery date when Trump might be out of office. On the next business day, Commerce Secretary Wilbur Ross announced the count would end October 5, as the administration appealed Koh's decision to the ninth circuit. Koh ordered the government to produce documents to show the Commerce Department's reasoning. The appeals court upheld Koh's ruling, and the Census Bureau announced on October 2 that the count would continue until October 31. Also on October 2, Koh threatened to hold Ross in contempt for repeated violations of her order.

The ninth circuit decision was appealed to the Supreme Court. On October 13, in a 7–1 ruling, the court issued an unsigned order granting the request to end the count early. Justice Sonia Sotomayor was the lone dissenter, saying that "meeting the deadline at the expense of the accuracy of the census is not a cost worth paying, especially when the Government has failed to show why it could not bear the lesser cost of expending more resources to meet the deadline or continuing its prior efforts to seek an extension from Congress." The count ultimately ended at 5:59 a.m. Eastern Time on October 16, 2020.

== Biden changes ==
As one of his first acts in office, President Joe Biden signed Executive Order 13986 on January 20, 2021, to discontinue citizenship tabulations at the city-block level using 2020 census data with administrative records. He also revoked a Trump directive that would have excluded those in the country illegally from the figures used for apportioning congressional seats among the states.

== Differential privacy ==
Researchers widely criticized the Census Bureau for intentionally making block-level data inaccurate by using differential privacy. In order to purportedly prevent identification of individuals' age, gender, race, household relationships, or homeownership, "disclosure avoidance noise" was added to the data, shifting individuals between blocks, towns, or other units. This can result in substantial discrepancies in minority populations and the sizes of small places. For example, Monowi, Nebraska, known for being the country's smallest incorporated municipality, was incorrectly reported to have two residents instead of one. Redistricting data would also be corrupted, making equal-size districts and majority-minority districts more difficult.

== Accuracy ==
On March 10, 2022, the Census Bureau released estimates of total overcount and undercount by demographic characteristic. The results found that the total Hispanic population had likely been undercounted by 4.99%, the Black population by 3.3% and Some other race by 4.34%. Asians were estimated to have been overcounted by 2.62%, Non-Hispanic Whites by 1.64%, and Pacific Islanders by 1.28%. Native Americans were estimated to have been undercounted by 0.91%; however, those living on reservations were undercounted by 5.64%, while those living elsewhere were overcounted by 3.06%.

Additional data released on May 19, 2022, found that six states (Arkansas, Florida, Illinois, Mississippi, Tennessee, and Texas) had significant undercounts and eight states (Delaware, Hawaii, Massachusetts, Minnesota, New York, Ohio, Rhode Island, and Utah) had significant overcounts of their populations.

== See also ==
- Race and ethnicity in the United States census
