= American Manufacturing and Packaging =

US non-profit corporation in Tennessee

American Manufacturing and Packaging, Inc.
- Company type: Non-profit corporation
- Industry: Food processing
- Founded: 1992 (as ARC Diversified), 2009 (as AMP)
- Headquarters: Cookeville, Tennessee
- Products: Bakery mix, frozen biscuits, vegetable oil, frozen breakfast sandwiches, co-packing, private labeling
- Website: http://www.arcdiversified.com/

American Manufacturing & Packaging (AMP), previously ARC Diversified, was a 501(c)(3) non-profit corporation located in Cookeville, Tennessee, mainly concerned with hiring and training the severely disabled in the manufacturing of food products. The company employed over 100 severely disabled people to manufacture and co-pack several private label brands and its own brands - Millstone Traditions, Granny Bunt and Beachhouse Seafood. On average, their brand portfolio reached more than four million people around the world daily. AMP was the first non-profit agency in the country to operate a USDA approved (PL No. 47-011-02) facility for the production of manufactured goods sold to the feeding programs of the US Government and private industry. AMP utilized the manufacture of food items to create opportunities for severely disabled in the development of work skills, vocational services and a better quality of life. It ceased operation in late 2011 following accusations of fraud and lying about the ingredients in a product.

== Background ==
The company operates under the Javits-Wagner-O'Day Act 41 U.S.C. § 46, a U.S. federal law mandating that all federal agencies purchase specified supplies and services from non-profit organizations employing blind persons or others with severe disabilities, named after Senator Jacob K. Javits, who led efforts to expand the Wagner-O'Day Act of 1938. Senator Javits led the efforts to expand the older law, which applied only to blind persons, and covered supplies but not services. The effort succeeded in spite of objections raised by organizations representing the blind, as expressed for example in Resolution 68-04 passed in 1968 by the American Council of the Blind.

The federal agency charged with administering the program is currently known as the Committee for Purchase from People Who Are Blind or Severely Disabled. The agency decides which commodities and services the government should purchase under the JWOD Act. The program it oversees, known for over three decades as the JWOD Program, was renamed "AbilityOne" by Congress in 2006.

AMP is the first non-profit agency in the country to operate a USDA-approved facility for the production of manufactured goods sold to the feeding programs of the US Government and private industry. They manufacture over 125 different varieties of dry mixes, dairy blends and oil products for federal customers such as the Department of Agriculture and the Department of Defense. AMP also produces for the private sector and participated in the reinvented federal procurement Prime Vendor program by delivering to full-line food distributors who are contracted to deliver to federal installations.

== History ==
AMP first began in 1992 as ARC-Diversified, the first non-profit corporation in the United States to operate as a USDA-approved manufacturer of goods sold to government and private feeding programs. While running as ARC-Diversified, the company managed to be recognized for their ventures by the USDA in 2004 as the Jarvis-Wagner-O'Day Contractor of the Year. ARC-Diversified helped the severely disabled through the development of work skills and a better quality of life.

However, in July 2006 the company filed for bankruptcy shortly after two directors resigned. Attempting to raise the price of cooking oil for sale to government organizations, USDA officials contested that the attempt to raise the bid was the result of inflated executive compensation totaling more than $1 million. Negotiations between ARC and the USDA stalled production and led to credit problems and layoffs. After the bankruptcy was filed, ARC closed its doors. The former executives settled the judgment in March 2008, agreeing that the judgment was based upon liability for "errors, omissions, negligence and breaches of duty" in connection with their positions with ARC, and not based upon actual fraud.

The company was resurrected as American Manufacturing and Packaging in 2008 through the help of a group of investors, rehiring many of the employees that were laid-off during the bankruptcy. As of November 2009, AMP has gained back many of its former customers and has been working to stabilize production, operate transparently, and continue to supply jobs to individuals with severe disabilities.

As of June 2011, officials with American Manufacturing and Packaging confirmed that a number of employees were temporarily furloughed. "Production operations continue with reduced staffing," the press release goes on to say. "The company is working to resume full production in the near future." Information as to how many employees have been furloughed, how long the furlough is expected to last and the reasons behind the furlough were not made public.

According to public files with the Excluded Parties List System, the USDA Farm Services Agency has suspended AMP's contract "pending completion of investigation or legal proceedings pursuant to FAR 9.407-2, GPO Instructions 110.11A or 39 CFR 601.113 and based on an indictment for, or adequate evidence of, the commission of fraud, antitrust violations, embezzlement, theft, forgery, bribery, false statements or other offenses indicating a lack of business integrity or adequate evidence of any other cause of a serious and compelling nature." The EPLS is a website provided by the GSA (General Services Administration) for the purpose of efficiently and conveniently spreading information on parties that are excluded from receiving federal contracts, certain subcontracts, and certain federal financial and non-financial assistance and benefits.

== Products ==
=== Dry mixes ===
- Drink
- Bakery mix
- Biscuit
- Brownie
- Cake mix
  - Gingerbread
  - White cake
  - Yellow cake
- Devil's food
- Cookie mix
  - Chocolate
  - Oatmeal
  - Sugar cookie
- Non-fat dry milk
- Pancake mix
- Waffle mix
- Whole egg crystals

=== Frozen food ===
- Frozen pucked biscuits
- Frozen biscuit
- Frozen breakfast sandwiches
- Frozen cake
- Frozen par-baked biscuits

=== Other ===
- Biodegradable packaging
- Bottled water
- Vitamin supplements
- Vegetable oil

== Former certifications ==
- ANSI/ISO/ASQ Q9001-2000 Certified
- USDA Total Quality Systems Audit Certified
- USDA Agriculture "Dairy Plants Surveyed and Approved for USDA Grading Service" Plant Number 47-1102
- Orthodox Union Kosher
- United States Food and Drug Administration Registration Number 16459898298
- Tennessee Department of Agriculture, Regulatory Services, Food and Dairy Establishment Number 33015
- American Institute of Baking Superior rating 2008
