= Federal Bureau of Prisons Program Statement =

Policy documents for Federal Bureau of Prisons

Federal Bureau of Prisons Program Statements are the policy documents of the Federal Bureau of Prisons (FBOP). They are promulgated by the FBOP director and FBOP staff are expected to adhere to them.

There are eight series of program statements dealing with various subjects. The Program Statements represent the internal policies of the Federal Bureau of Prisons, and often quote the United States Code and Code of Federal Regulations and provide the FBOP's interpretations of these laws and regulations and procedures for implementing them.

== Series ==
Category/Description	Series	Examples
General Administration and Management	1000	Policy development, forms and records management, public information, external organization and community relations, legal activities including the Freedom of Information and Privacy Acts, and safety and occupational health/environment
Financial Management and Budgeting	2000	Budget development and execution, accounting, financial management, travel, employee and inmate pay and payroll, and financial audits
Personnel/Staff Management	3000	Staff ethics, recruitment and hiring, security and background investigations of prospective and current employees, affirmative action and upward mobility
Support Services and Logistics	4000	Acquisitions (procurement), facilities maintenance and operations, inmate trust fund operations, and food services
Inmate and Custody Management	5000	Telephone, correspondence, and visiting procedures; inmate personal property; admission and orientation; inmate programs; inmate discipline; parole hearings; state sentences; and inmate release management
Medical, Dental, and Health	6000	Inmate health care services; psychiatric services; dental services; health care provider employment, qualifications, credentials, and practice agreements; and drug and alcohol surveillance and testing
Community Corrections and Correctional Contract Services	7000	Community corrections management and contracting; community corrections centers referrals and placements; pretrial inmates; private sector secure correctional facilities contracting and oversight; and community drug treatment services
Industries, Education, and Vocational Training (UNICOR)	8000	Federal Prison Industries management and organization; marketing and sales; customer service; product development and quality controls; and inmate employment
