= Javits–Wagner–O'Day Act =

1971 act of the United States Congress

Wagner-O'Day Act
- Other short titles: Javits-Wagner-O'Day Act (post-1971) · JWOD
- Long title: An Act to create a Committee on Purchases of Blind-made Products, and for other purposes.
- Acronyms (colloquial): JWOD
- Enacted by: the 75th United States Congress
- Effective: June 25, 1938

Citations
- Public law: Public Law 75-739
- Statutes at Large: 52 Stat. 1196

Legislative history
- Introduced in the House as H.R. 10609 by Rep. Caroline Love Goodwin O'Day (D‑NY AL) on May 10, 1938; Committee consideration by House Committee on Labor; Passed the House on June 13, 1938 (Voice vote); Passed the Senate on June 14, 1938 (Voice vote); Signed into law by President Franklin D. Roosevelt on June 25, 1938

Major amendments
- Javits-Wagner-O'Day Act of 1971 (Public Law 92-28)

The Javits–Wagner–O'Day Act 41 U.S.C. § 46 et seq. is a U.S. federal law requiring that all federal agencies purchase specified supplies and services from nonprofit agencies employing persons who are blind or have other significant disabilities. The Act was passed by the 92nd United States Congress in 1971 as a significant amendment to a prior act in 1938.

== History ==
The act is named after its sponsor, Senator Jacob K. Javits, and the Wagner–O'Day Act, passed by the 75th United States Congress in 1938, which had been named after Senator Robert F. Wagner and Congresswoman Caroline O'Day.

Javits led the efforts to expand the older law, which was called the Wagner–O'Day Act, and which mandated that federal agencies purchase products from workshops for the blind meeting specific qualifications. The effort for expansion succeeded in spite of objections raised by organizations representing the blind, as expressed for example in Resolution 68-04 passed in 1968 by the American Council of the Blind.

== Program administration ==
Committee for Purchase From People Who Are Blind or Severely Disabled (U.S. AbilityOne Commission)
- Seals of the Committee for Purchase From People Who Are Blind or Severely Disabled and the U.S. AbilityOne Commission

- AbilityOne logo

Agency overview
- Formed: 1971
- Preceding agency: Committee on Purchases of Blind Made Products
- Jurisdiction: United States
- Agency executive: Jeffrey A. Koses, Chairperson
- Website: www.abilityone.gov

The federal agency charged with administering the program is formally known as the Committee for Purchase from People Who Are Blind or Severely Disabled, currently operating as the U.S. AbilityOne Commission (AbilityOne being the trade name of the program), which replaced the prior Committee on Purchases of Blind Made Products established by the 1938 act. The agency decides which commodities and services the government should purchase under the Javits Wagner O'Day Act. The program it oversees, known for over three decades as the Javits Wagner O'Day Program, was renamed "AbilityOne" by Congress in 2006. The Committee is composed of fifteen Presidentially-appointed members, eleven of whom represent governmental agencies (Department of Agriculture, Air Force, Army, Commerce, Defense, Education, Justice, United States Department of Labor, Navy and Veterans Affairs, and the General Services Administration). The remaining four members are private citizens knowledgeable about the employment problems of people who are blind or have other severe disabilities, including those employed by nonprofit agencies affiliated with the AbilityOne Program.

Older logo, from the Javits-Wagner-O'Day Program

The Committee has designated two national nonprofit associations (NPAs) to assist with the program implementation and execution: the National Industries for the Blind (NIB) and SourceAmerica (formerly known as National Industries for the Severely Handicapped, or NISH). More than 600 NPAs associated with either NIB or SourceAmerica produce products and services under the AbilityOne Program. The core criteria for NPA eligibility is that 75% of total direct labor hours must be performed by people who are blind or have other significant disabilities. The AbilityOne Program is the largest employment resource for people who are blind or have other significant disabilities, helping to employ more than 40,000 people.

=== Procurement list ===
Under JWOD, AbilityOne is required to maintain a "procurement list" of goods and services which are able and willing to be provided by NPAs providing employment for blind or severely disabled persons. When an item is placed on that list (which requires AbilityOne to determine that an item can be procured from an NPA and the effect of doing so on contracts with existing contractors), with the exception of similar items provided by Federal Prison Industries (which has first priority over all other suppliers), government agencies must procure the good or service from the NPA designated at the price set by AbilityOne. The only exception is if the NPA cannot provide the good or service in the quantity and time frame required by the agency, and the quantity and/or time frame cannot be adjusted by the agency due to its needs, then the NPA or Committee can grant an exception and the agency can then procure the good or service through other contracting channels.

The procurement list also includes any variants to an existing item (such as an item of a different color or size), items which are replacements for items already on the list, and items which are "similar to" existing items. An item can be removed from the list only if 1) the government no longer requires the good or service or 2) no NPA is able or willing to provide the good or service.

A similar law, the Randolph–Sheppard Act of 1936, mandates that blind people be given precedence over other entities for the operation of vending facilities on Federal property, and is not covered by JWOD or AbilityOne.

== Federal investigations ==
The Javits-Wagner-O'Day Act is itself a product of Franklin D. Roosevelt's New Deal policies from 1933-1938. The Wagner O'Day act was signed into law on June 25, 1938, and required that all government agencies prioritize the purchasing of products to suppliers that employ individuals who are blind. The Javits–Wagner–O'Day Act expanded the law, requiring specified supplies and services come from nonprofit agencies employing persons who are blind or have other severe disabilities. The Act was passed by the 92nd United States Congress in 1971.

Federal investigations surrounding the AbilityOne program, and its central non-profit agency SourceAmerica, mirror the problems highlighted by Roosevelt's failed National Industrial Recovery Act. The NIRA tossed away antitrust laws and suppressed competition by creating monopolies. These policies continued even after the NIRA was declared unconstitutional in 1935.

== See also ==
- Randolph–Sheppard Act of 1936, mandating that blind people be given precedence over the operation of vending facilities on Federal property
- ARC Diversified
- Title 41 of the United States Code
- Travis Association for the Blind
- Skilcraft
