= Federal Prison Industries =

United States government corporation

Federal Prison Industries, Inc.
- Trade name: UNICOR
- Type: State-owned enterprise
- Industry: Penal labor
- Founded: June 23, 1934; 92 years ago
- Headquarters: Washington, D.C., U.S.
- Key people: David D. Spears, Chairman; Donald R. Elliott, Vice Chairman
- Revenue: $531,453,000 (2019)
- Net income: $61,166,000 (2019)
- Owner: Federal Bureau of Prisons
- Number of employees: 10,896 (2016)
- Website: www.unicor.gov

Federal Prison Industries, Inc. (FPI), doing business as UNICOR (stylized in all lowercase) since 1977, is a corporation wholly owned by the United States government. It was created in 1934 as a prison labor program within the Federal Bureau of Prisons.

Under US federal law, all physically abled inmates who are not a security risk or have a health exception are required to work, either for UNICOR or at some other prison job. As of 2021, inmates earned between $0.23 to $1.15 per hour.

As a "mandatory source" for federal departments (having priority over all other sources, including JWOD sources from blind or severely disabled persons), FPI receives priority in any purchases of its products.

== History ==
A statute in May 1930 provided for the employment of prisoners, the creation of a corporation for the purpose was authorized by a statute in June 1934, and the Federal Prison Industries was created by executive order 6917 on 11 December 1934 by Franklin D. Roosevelt. It officially began operations on 1 January 1935 as a wholly-owned corporation of the US Government.

Its mandate according to the UNICOR.gov website is to, "protect society and reduce crime by preparing inmates with job training and practical work skills for reentry success."

In 1977, the trade name UNICOR was adopted.

In 1983, UNICOR contracted Booz-Allen & Hamilton Inc. to conduct a study to figure out the marketing needs of UNICOR and set up a marketing department. This was done to explore untapped markets and seek new products that UNICOR could produce.

By the mid-1980s, UNICOR had included 47 prisons with a total amount of 32,000 inmates.

In 2017, UNICOR had $483.8 million in net sales. In 2024. UNICOR celebrated its 90th anniversary.

== Activities ==
Under current law, all physically able inmates who are not a security risk or have a health exception are required to work, either for UNICOR or at some other prison job. Inmates typically earn between US$0.23 and US$1.15 per hour, and all inmates with court-ordered financial obligations must use at least 50% of this UNICOR income to satisfy those debts.

Deductions are then taken for taxes, victim restitution, program costs and court-imposed legal obligations. In fiscal year 2016, FPI's business were organized, managed, and internally reported as six operation segments based upon products and services. These segments are Agribusiness, Clothing and Textiles, Electronics, Office Furniture, Recycling, and Services.

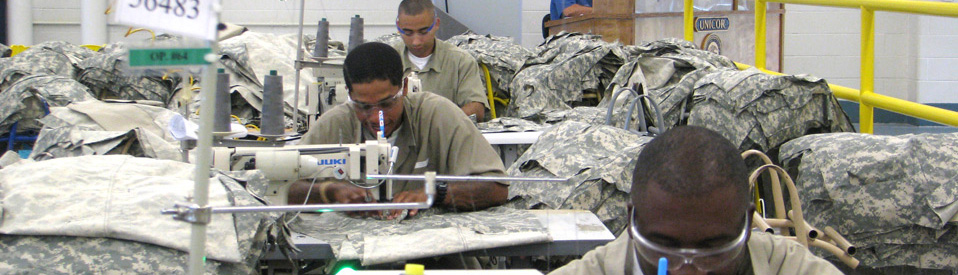
Prison labor in a UNICOR program producing uniforms.

UNICOR currently produces the Interceptor body armor vest, primarily for foreign sales and international customers.

As of November 2025, UNICOR had 76 Active and 77 Available UNICOR locations. The active locations included fields such as: textiles, agribusiness, recycling, optics, furniture, and electronics.

== Criticism ==
One report detailed an FPI operation at a California prison in which inmates de-manufactured computer cathode-type monitors. Industry standard practice for this mandates a mechanical crushing machine to minimize danger from flying glass, with an isolated air system to avoid releasing lead, barium, and phosphor compounds to the workplace atmosphere. At the FPI facility prisoners de-manufactured CRTs with hammers. FPI initiated corrective action to address this finding, and claims to currently meet or exceed industry standards in its recycling operations.

Combat helmets produced by FPI at one factory were at the center of a US Department of Justice lawsuit and $3 million settlement paid by ArmorSource, the prime contractor. The U.S. Attorney's Offices declined to criminally prosecute or file any civil action against FPI staff. The helmets were produced for ArmorSource between 2008 and 2009 and failed to meet standards. The recall of both helmets cost FPI $19 million. With Defense Contract Management Agency audit staff, FPI identified opportunities to improve its Quality Management System in areas including improved management staff oversight, proper control of quality procedures, training, and implementation of corrective action. FPI implemented new procedures to address these areas.

== Leadership ==
FPI is governed by a six-man Board of Directors, all of whom are appointed by POTUS and who are supposed to represent, "Industry, Retailers and Consumers, Agriculture, the Secretary of Defense, and the Attorney General." The members of the Board serve without compensation. The following is a list of the leadership of FPI as of January 2026:

- William K. Marshall III, FPI Commissioner and Director of the Federal Bureau of Prisons
- Todd A. Plimpton, Chief Executive Officer & Corporate Secretary
- David D. Spears, Chairman of the Board of Directors
- Donald R. Elliott, Vice Chair of the Board
- Jolene Ann Lauria, member of the Board of Directors
- Lee Lofthus, member of the Board of Directors
- Monty Wilkinson, member of the Board of Directors
- By law there should be a sixth member of the board, but it is currently vacant.

== See also ==
- Penal labor in the United States
- California Prison Industry Authority
- Chain gang
- Convict leasing
- Incarceration in the United States
- Labor camp
- Title 28 of the Code of Federal Regulations
- Skilcraft
