= James J. Gallagher =

American educator (1926–2014)

Director of the Office of Special Education Programs
- In office 1967–?
- Preceded by: Position established
- Succeeded by: Judy A. Schrag

Personal details
- Born: June 11, 1926 Pittsburgh, Pennsylvania, US
- Died: January 17, 2014 (aged 87) Chapel Hill, North Carolina, US
- Education: University of Pittsburgh; Pennsylvania State University
- Occupation: Educator

Military service
- Allegiance: United States
- Branch/service: United States Navy
- Battles/wars: World War II

James J. Gallagher (June 11, 1926 – January 17, 2014) was an American educator specializing in special and gifted education.

== Early life and education ==
Gallagher was born on June 11, 1926, in Pittsburgh, to special educator Anna Mae. He served in World War II stateside, as a member of the United States Navy. He studied biology at the University of Pittsburgh, then psychology at Pennsylvania State University. In 1949, he married Gertrude "Rani" Cunningham.

== Career ==
Originally a psychologist for a children's hospital in Dayton, Ohio, Gallagher began his career in the mid-20th century, teaching students of average intelligence.He also taught at universities such as the University of Illinois Urbana-Champaign, Michigan State University, and the Graham Institute of the University of North Carolina at Chapel Hill, from 1970.

Gallagher served as assistant to the United States Commissioner of Education from 1967 to 1970, under Harold Howe and James E. Allen Jr. He worked in the Department of Health, Education, and Welfare, as well as serving as the first director of the Office of Special Education Programs. His efforts whilst in government contributed to the passing of the Individuals with Disabilities Education Act of 1975. He was creditied with creating the Individualized Education Program, as well as helping Sidney P. Marland Jr. with the Marland report, which gave extra education requirements to gifted children. He helped found the North Carolina School of Science and Mathematics in 1980.

Gallagher died on January 17, 2014, aged 87, in Chapel Hill, North Carolina, which was announced by the UNC in February.
