= SourceAmerica =

U.S. nonprofit organization

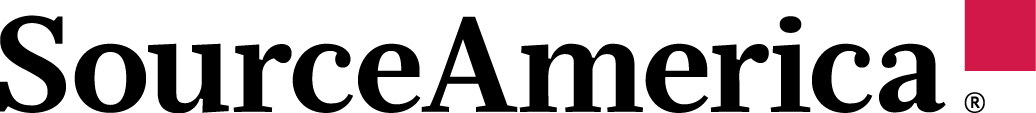
- Founded: June 26, 1974; 52 years ago
- Type: Central Nonprofit
- Legal status: 501(c)(3) nonprofit organization
- Headquarters: Vienna, Virginia
- Location: United States
- Key people: Steve Soroka (CEO)
- Employees: 400+
- Website: www.sourceamerica.org

SourceAmerica (formerly NISH) is a U.S. nonprofit agency, located in Vienna, Virginia, that creates employment opportunities for people with disabilities through its national network of affiliated nonprofit agencies.

== History ==
SourceAmerica is one of two U.S. central nonprofits—the other being National Industries for the Blind—designated in the Javits–Wagner–O'Day Act to support nonprofit agencies participating in the AbilityOne Program. Both central nonprofits work to provide employment opportunities for people who are blind or have other significant disabilities by providing them opportunities to produce goods and services under federal contracts.

Historically, its largest customer was the U.S. Department of Defense, and affiliated nonprofits manufacture military uniforms, gear for Special Forces, chemical protective suits, military recruit bags, and other items. Its agencies also sew American flags that the Veterans Administration sends to military families when a veteran passes.

SourceAmerica was incorporated on June 26, 1974, as National Industries for the Severely Handicapped (NISH). The organization changed its name to SourceAmerica on July 1, 2013.

On July 31, 2015, CNN reported that SourceAmerica was being investigated by authorities for illegal operations, financial fraud, mismanagement, operating in violation of the law, steering of contracts, and possibly obstruction of justice.

On September 4, 2015, federal agents raided the corporate offices of Goodwill Industries in Memphis, Tennessee, in an apparent escalation of the investigation of the AbilityOne Program. Goodwill Industries has received more than $22 million in AbilityOne contracts since 2010, and in 2017 SourceAmerica had two Goodwill executives on its board of directors.

On November 16, 2015, WikiLeaks released over 30 hours of recordings of SourceAmerica's former attorney Jean Robinson. "That's the way they play the game. We are dealing with the mafia here, the old SourceAmerica mafia," Robinson states.

Following the accusations made in 2015, SourceAmerica surveyed its nonprofit agencies. Using certifications by the individual nonprofit agencies, audits conducted by the U.S. AbilityOne Commission and data from on-site reviews conducted by SourceAmerica, results showed 96 percent of the nonprofit agencies in their network met or exceeded the 75 percent ratio.

On October 28, 2015, the Court of Federal Claims ruled in favor of SourceAmerica in a bid protest brought by NTI. The judge's ruling indicated that SourceAmerica complied with the law and the NTI's allegations in the case were not true.

On May 18, 2016, Senator John McCain introduced language into the National Defense Authorization Act for 2017 to discontinue Department of Defense contracting with the AbilityOne program and SourceAmerica until they can be reformed. The bill states in part: "The Secretary of Defense shall not contract with the AbilityOne nonprofit agency ... until such time that the Inspector General for the Department of Defense certifies to Congress ... the internal controls and financial management systems of the AbilityOne non-profit agency ... are sufficient to protect the Department of Defense against waste, fraud, and abuse."

This Senate language was modified during the FY 17 NDAA House-Senate Conference Committee. The final language, Section 898 of S. 2943, signed into law on December 23, 2016, created the Panel on Department of Defense and AbilityOne Contracting Oversight, Accountability, and Integrity.

== Services and programs ==
SourceAmerica consists of a network of hundreds of organizations that create employment opportunities and choices for people with disabilities. Through that network, SourceAmerica provides employment opportunities to more than 100,000 people with disabilities.

Headquartered in Vienna, Virginia, SourceAmerica provides its nonprofit agency network with business development, contract management, legislative and regulatory assistance, communications and public relations materials, information technology support, engineering and technical assistance, and extensive professional training needed for successful nonprofit management.

The agency hosts an annual Grassroots Advocacy Conference to empower people with disabilities to speak up for themselves on Capitol Hill. Since 1998, it has invited members of its network to Washington each June to meet with lawmakers about disability employment issues.

Every year, the SourceAmerica Design Challenge teams high school and college students with people with disabilities to invent engineering solutions. Students meet with a nonprofit agency or business that employs people with disabilities to create processes, devices or programs that improve the workplace.

SourceAmerica Pathway to Careers is a customized employment program designed to pair applicants with employers. Pathway's staff uses the participant's profile to match applicants with employers in the community.

At both the Special Olympics 2018 USA Games and the Special Olympics 50th anniversary celebrations in Chicago, SourceAmerica hosted a job fair for athletes. The Journey of Employment job fair included vendors such as Amazon, Walmart, Kaiser Permanente, Brooks, Boeing and more. Athletes visited a series of stations to assess, polish and present their skills to prospective employers that recognize the potential of Special Olympics athletes on the job.

SourceAmerica and its network of nonprofit agencies also contract with commercial entities to provide products and services. In addition to companies such as Starbucks, Inter-American Development Bank, PetSafe and Grainger, small entrepreneurial ventures such as Blush & Whimsy and Luna Innovations Incorporated have found business solutions with nonprofit agencies in the network.

== Governance ==
SourceAmerica is governed by a board of directors. Each of the six founding organizations has a permanent seat on the board: Goodwill Industries International, National Easter Seals Society, United Cerebral Palsy, The Arc, Network of Jewish Human Service Agencies and ACCSES.

== See also ==
- Javits–Wagner–O'Day Act
