= Office of Special Education and Rehabilitative Services =

US education office

Agency overview
- Formed: October 17, 1979
- Preceding agency: Bureau of Education for the Handicapped
- Headquarters: 400 Maryland Avenue, SW; Washington, D.C.
- Agency executive: Glenna Gallo, Assistant Secretary
- Parent department: United States Department of Education
- Child agencies: Office of Special Education Programs; Rehabilitation Services Administration
- Key document: 20 U.S.C. § 3417
- Website: www.ed.gov/osers

The Office of Special Education and Rehabilitative Services (OSERS) is a program of the United States Department of Education. OSERS' official mission is "to provide leadership to achieve full integration and participation in society of people with disabilities by ensuring equal opportunity and access to, and excellence in, education, employment and community living."

== History ==
In 1979, Congress passed legislation that split the Department of Health, Education, and Welfare in two parts — creating the Department of Education and the Department of Health and Human Services. The Bureau of Education for the Handicapped (BEH) — established in 1967 by Title VI of the Elementary and Secondary Education Act — then became the core of the new Office of Special Education and Rehabilitative Services. Dr. Edwin W. Martin, Jr., then Deputy Commissioner of Education, and director of BEH was nominated by President Carter to be the first Assistant Secretary for OSERS. He was confirmed unanimously by the Senate. The Rehabilitation Services Administration and the National Institute of Disability and Rehabilitation Research were the other components of OSERS.

== Divisions ==
OSERS is composed of the Office of the Assistant Secretary for Special Education and Rehabilitative Services and two program components:

- Office of Special Education Programs (OSEP)
- Rehabilitation Services Administration.

Until 2014, OSERS also contained the National Institute on Disability and Rehabilitation Research. The Workforce Innovation and Opportunity Act changed its name to the National Institute on Disability, Independent Living, and Rehabilitation Research and relocated it to the Administration for Community Living, within the Department of Health and Human Services.

== Leadership and activities ==
As of May 15, 2023, Glenna Gallo is the Assistant Secretary for Special Education and Rehabilitative Services.

Primary laws and statutes authorizing OSERS' programs and activities include:

- Individuals with Disabilities Education Act amendments of 1997. (IDEA)
- Rehabilitation Act of 1973. (Rehab Act)
- The Education of the Deaf Act. (EDA)
- Act to Promote Education of the Blind of March 3, 1879.
- The Helen Keller National Center Act. (HKNC)
- The Assistive Technology Act of 2004. (AT Act)
- The Randolph–Sheppard Act. (Vending Facilities For The Blind)

== See also ==
- Title 34 of the Code of Federal Regulations
