= Office of Special Education Programs =

United States Department of Education
- Seal of the US Department of Education

Department overview
- Formed: October 17, 1979
- Preceding agencies: United States Department of Health, Education, and Welfare; United States Office of Education
- Jurisdiction: Federal government of the United States
- Employees: 5,000 (2007)
- Annual budget: US$32 billion (2009); US$56 billion (est. 2010); US$71 billion (est. 2011); ARRA Funding: US$102 billion (2009); US$51 billion (est. 2010); US$23 billion (est. 2011)
- Department executives: Arne Duncan, Secretary; Anthony W. Miller, Deputy Secretary
- Child Department: Click here
- Website: www.ed.gov

Office of Special Education Programs (OSEP), formerly the Bureau of the Education of the Handicapped (BEH) is part of the U.S. Department of Education. OSEP provides leadership and support for professionals working with children with disabilities. Another critical role of OSEP is to protect the educational rights of children with disabilities from age three through twenty-one. OSEP is supervised by the Office of the Deputy Secretary of Education through the Office of Special Education and Rehabilitative Services (OSERS).

== Mission ==
The Office of Special Education Programs (OSEP) is a unit within the U.S Department of Education. Originally created as the Bureau of the Education of the Handicapped in 1967, its purpose is to strengthen and coordinate activities on behalf of students with disabilities. OSEP activities are authorized through the Individuals with Disabilities Education Act (IDEA). Its current mission is to improve results for infants, toddlers, children and youth with disabilities ages birth through 21 by providing leadership and financial support to assist states and local districts. OSEP programs are intended to ensure that the rights of infants, toddlers, children, and youth with disabilities and their parents are protected.

== Responsibilities ==
The Office of Special Education Programs (OSEP) provides leadership and support to assist states and local districts to provide a free and appropriate public education (FAPE) in the Least Restrictive Environment (LRE) to children with disabilities. OSEP administers the Individuals with Disabilities Education Act (IDEA) which provides for the education of children with disabilities in the United States, pre-kindergarten through high school graduation or age 21. Among its responsibilities OSEP aims to:

- Create and disseminate federal policy information regarding early intervention, preschool, elementary and secondary school for students with disabilities;
- Provide state-administered program grants and competitive grants for discretionary programs;
- Fund research and support innovative practice in the education of children with disabilities;
- Promote the training of educational professionals, parents and volunteers;
- Monitor and report on the implementation of federal policy and programs for children with disabilities; and
- Coordinate the review of OSEP activities by stakeholders including: other federal agencies, state agencies, the private sector, parent and professional organizations and organizations of persons with disabilities.

== Organization ==
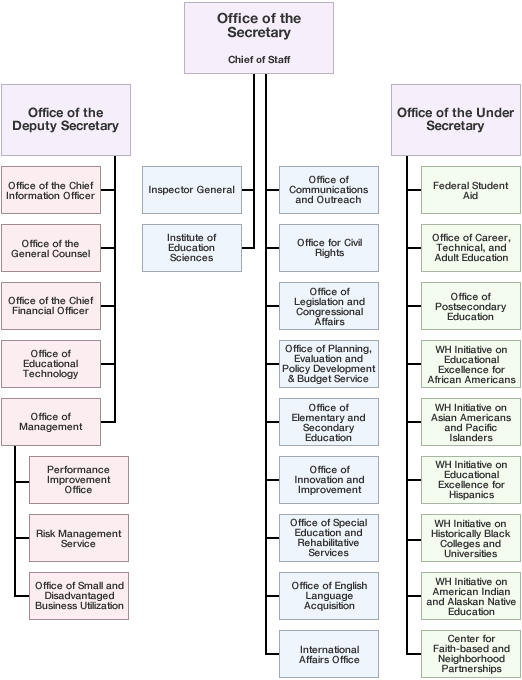
Department of Education structure

OSEP is under the auspices of the Office of the Deputy Secretary of Education through the Office of Special Education and Rehabilitative Services (OSERS). OSEP consists of the Office of the Director, Program Support Services Group, Monitoring and State Improvement Planning Division and Research to Practice Division. The Early Childhood Team, Elementary and Middle School Team, Secondary/Transition/Postsecondary Team and National Initiatives Team make up the Research to Practice Division.

=== List of directors ===
- 1967: James J. Gallagher
- 1990: Judy A. Schrag
- 1993: Tom Hehir
- 1999: Barbara Gantwerk
- 2002: Stephanie Smith Lee
- 2006: Alexa Posny
- 2010: Melody Musgrove
- 2021: Valerie C. Williams

== See also ==
- Special Education
- No Child Left Behind
- Educational attainment in the United States
- Education in the United States
- Secretary of Education
- School Improvement Grant
