= Travis Association for the Blind =

Coordinates: 30.2129642°N 97.7410068°W

Austin Lighthouse for the Blind (Travis Association for the Blind)
- Type: Non-profit
- Industry: Distribution; Manufacturing; Training; E-commerce
- Founded: 1934, incorporated: 1935-03-12 in Austin, Texas, United States
- Headquarters: 4512 S. Pleasant Valley Road Austin, Texas 78744
- Number of locations: 4
- Key people: James Meehan (President and CEO); Pete Carrera (Chief Operating Officer); |Meg Morreale (Chief Financial Officer)}}
- Number of employees: ▲400 (2022)
- Website: austinlighthouse.org

Travis Association for the Blind, also known as the Austin Lighthouse for the Blind, is a 501(c)(3) non-profit organization employing over 400 Texans of which approximately 200 are legally blind in four facilities in southeast Austin, Texas, as well as a facility in Taylor, Texas. Travis Association for the Blind warehouses, distributes, manufactures, and repairs a wide variety of merchandise for local, state, and federal government as well as private industry.

The mission of the Austin Lighthouse is to enhance the opportunities for the economic and personal independence of people who are blind or visually impaired by creating, sustaining, and improving employment. The Austin Lighthouse’s mission ensures long-term employment and training opportunities through AbilityOne and Texas State-Use strategic sourcing programs, as well as supporting the local community with job training and skill attainment. TAB is a National Industries for the Blind (NIB) associated agency.

== History ==
Henry Louis Hilgartner was considered the "founding father" of the Travis County Association for the Blind. he received his M.D. degree at the University of Maryland in 1889. He did advanced study in Baltimore, New York, and Vienna before he moved to Austin, Texas, in July 1891. In 1893 he was appointed oculist for the Texas School for the Blind. After receiving his bachelor of science degree from the University of Texas in 1896, he became surgeon of the Texas Eye, Ear, Nose, and Throat Hospital (later Texas Sanitarium). During World War I Hilgartner served as eye, ear, nose, and throat surgeon and examiner for the United States School of Military Aeronautics.

Commonly known as the Austin Lighthouse, the [Travis County] Association for the Blind was founded in 1934 eventually shortening its name to Travis Association for the Blind.

At its start, the organization employed blind people to produce woven mats and canning peaches. During World War II the United States government took advantage of the newly legislated Wagner-O'Day Act of 1938 and began purchasing mops produced at the Austin Lighthouse. In 1971, under the leadership of United States Senator Jacob Javits of New York the act was amended to include all individuals with severe disabilities, becoming the Javits–Wagner–O'Day Act (JWOD). Over the years, the Austin Lighthouse has manufactured a number of different sewing products, bottled and packaged 200+ different skin care products, and warehoused/distributed items for the military and state government customers.

Major League Baseball player "Prince" Oana worked for Travis Association for the Blind during seven years in the late 1950s and early 1960s because of cataracts in both eyes.

Today, the Austin Lighthouse is composed of three main divisions; distribution, manufacturing, and training/education. The distribution division has approximately 800,000 sqft of warehouse space, receiving, sorting, identifying, laundering, repairing, labeling, packaging, and distributing items for the U.S. Army, Marine Corps, Air Force, Navy, and Coast Guard. In the manufacturing division, a variety of skincare products are produced, as well as textiles, notebook binders, award plaques, and others. The Training and Education Services division provides skill-enhancing training, adaptive equipment, and employment searching services to blind and visually impaired customers.

== Products ==
In a partnership with Gojo Industries, TAB packages and redistributes skincare products, including Purell Instant hand Sanitizer and Micrell antibacterial hand soap under the Skilcraft trade name.

TAB also manufactures and distributes the following products:

- Military uniform trousers and rigger belts
- Award plaques
- Key cases
- Soap dispensers
- Smartshield sunscreen
- CorrectPac cleaning products
- Cooling towels
- PURELL disinfecting sprays
- Shelf-stable food commodities

== Services ==
The Austin Lighthouse's Distribution Services department currently has two federal contracts. One is with the Air Force and Marine Corps providing Third Party Logistics (AF/MC3PL) support. In it, the Austin Lighthouse provides supply chain services to the U.S. Armed Forces through a contract with Defense Logistics Agency Troop Support, formerly Defense Supply Center Philadelphia. In the other large distribution services contract, Austin Lighthouse provides distribution, laundry, and repair services for the United States Army through the Regional Logistics Support Center (RLSC). The RLSC facilities are located in south Austin and Taylor, Texas.

In October 2022, Travis Association for the Blind established a Certification Testing Center for students and professionals to take certification examinations. It is the first independently-owned certified Pearson VUE testing center with adaptive technology software permanently installed. The Certification Testing Center was established with funding and support of the Microsoft Corporation.

The Austin Lighthouse established SHOPAUSTIN.ORG, an office supply ecommerce website offering office supplies and business accessories online, in October 2022. The Austin Lighthouse operates the site as an Ability One authorized distributor and manufacturing agency. All revenues generated from the website sales help provide employment, training, and services to the blind and visually impaired community.20
