= Bakery mix =

Pre-mixed baking product

Bakery mix is an add water only pre-mixed baking product consisting of flour, dry milk, shortening, salt, and baking powder (a leavening agent). A bakery mix can be used to make a wide variety of baked goods from pizza dough to dumplings to pretzels. The typical flavor profile of bakery mix differs from that of pancake mix. Bakery mixes do not require refrigeration.

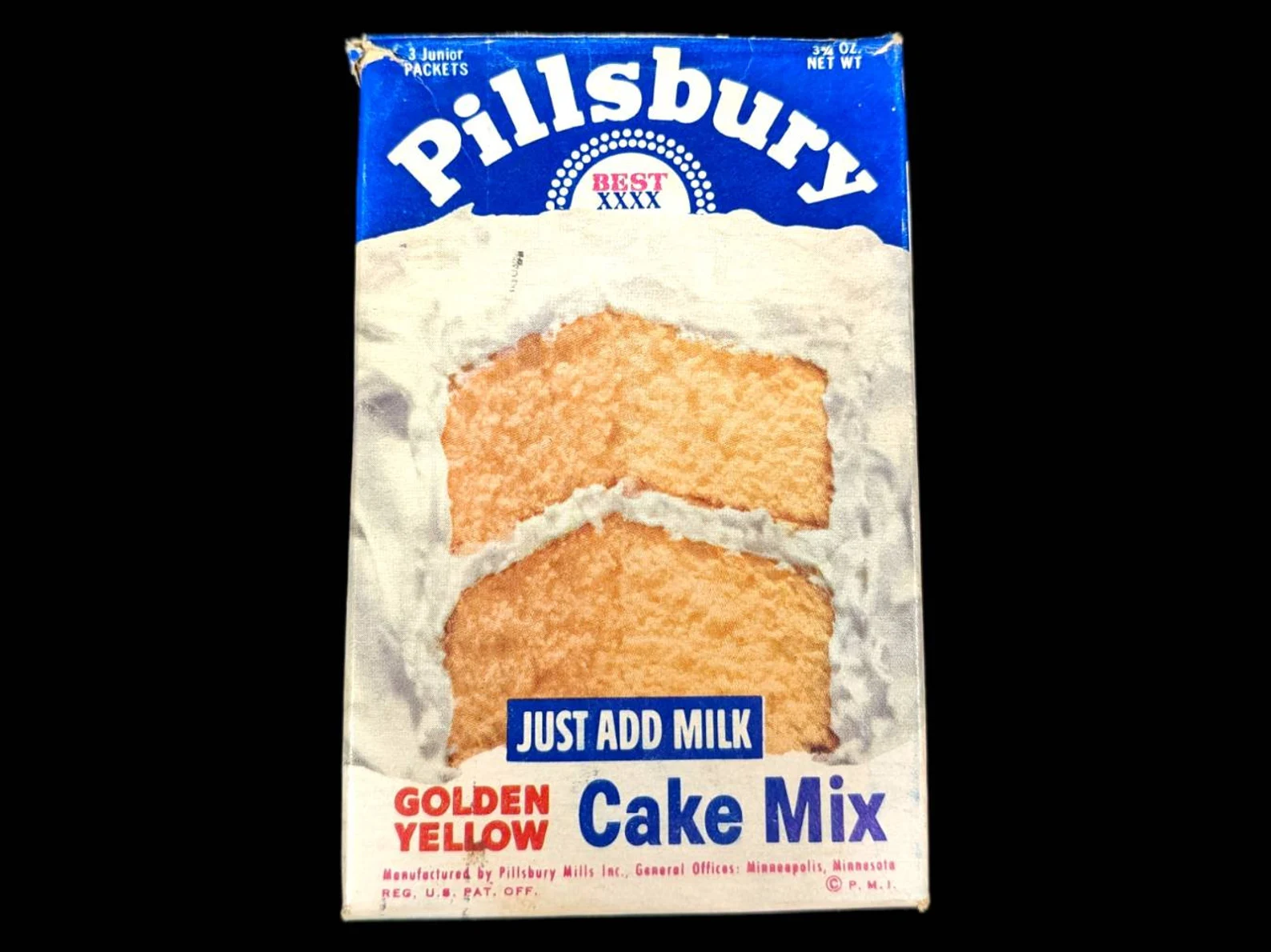
1950s box of Pillsbury's Golden Yellow cake mix

== History ==
Chris Rutt and Charles Underwood of the Pearl Milling Company, developed Aunt Jemima, the first "ready mix." The baking mix was designed for people to just add water to create a mixture that could create pancakes.

Carl Smith, a sales executive at General Mills, got the idea of selling a pre-mixed blend of flour, salt, baking powder, and lard to create biscuits from a chef on a train in 1930. After Smith pitched the idea for a biscuit mix to sell, head chemist of General Mills, Charlie Kress, created Bisquick. Bisquick entered the market in 1931. In the 1940s, Bisquick began using "a world of baking in a box," and printed recipes for other baked goods such as dumplings, muffins, and coffee cake.

In 1933, Pittsburgh molasses company, P. Duff and Sons, patented the first cake mix after blending dehydrated molasses with dehydrated flour, sugar, eggs, and other ingredients. P. Duff and Sons created the cake mix to move surplus molasses, requiring 100 pounds of molasses for every 100 pounds of wheat flour.

After World War Two, flour companies such as General Mills, and Pillsbury, began selling cake mixes due to the surplus of flour. By the 1950s, there were hundreds of cake mix companies. In 1948, Pillsbury introduced the first chocolate cake mix.

== Use of eggs ==
The Duff company patented a baking mixture requiring fresh eggs in 1935 with writing in the patent application, “The housewife and the purchasing public in general seem to prefer fresh eggs and hence the use of dried or powdered eggs is somewhat of a handicap from a psychological standpoint."

Other companies would continue to use powdered eggs in their bakery mixes, and it's not until sales flattened between 1956 and 1960 that major food companies would revise their formula to incorporate fresh eggs. Ernest Dichter, an analyst for General Mills, interviewed women that used the cake mixes and reported that the simplicity of the mixes made women feel too self indulgent because there wasn't enough work involved.

While some say that the difference caused by using fresh eggs was purely psychological, others argued that the inclusion of fresh eggs simply created better products. The cake mix with dried eggs frequently tasted of eggs, stuck to the pan and had poorer texture.
