= Glenna Gallo =

American educator

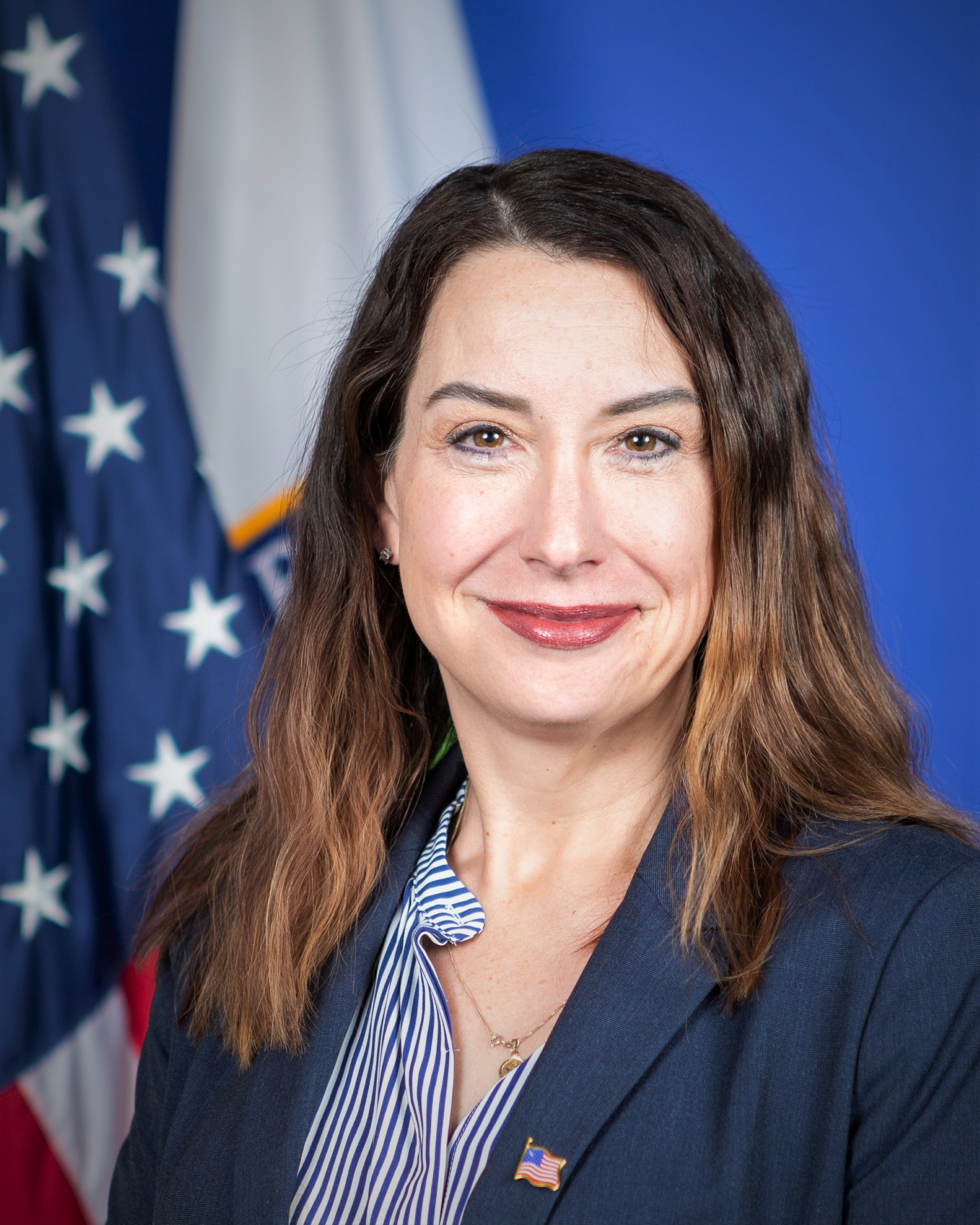

Assistant Secretary of Education for Special Education and Rehabilitative Services
- In office May 15, 2023 – January 20, 2025
- President: Joe Biden
- Preceded by: Johnny Collett

Personal details
- Education: University of Nevada, Las Vegas (BS); Utah State University (MS); Western Governors University (MBA)

Glenna Laureen Wright-Gallo is an American educator who served as assistant secretary of education for special education and rehabilitative services in the Biden administration from 2023 to 2025.

== Education ==
Gallo earned a Bachelor of Science in special education and teaching from the University of Nevada, Las Vegas, a Master of Science and special education and teaching from Utah State University, and a Master of Business Administration from Western Governors University.

== Career ==
From 1997 to 2005, Gallo worked as a special education teacher in the Jordan School District. She joined the Utah State Board of Education in 2005, serving as an education specialist until 2008 and state/federal compliance officer from 2008 to 2010. From 2010 to 2017, she served as Utah director of special education.

Since 2017, she has served as assistant superintendent in the Washington State Office of Superintendent of Public Instruction. As assistant superintendent, Gallo has appeared frequently as a special education specialist on NPR.

=== Nomination to Department of Education ===
On November 12, 2021, President Joe Biden nominated Gallo to be an assistant secretary of education. Her nomination was sent to the Senate on December 2, 2021. Gallo's nomination was favorably reported by the United States Senate Committee on Health, Education, Labor and Pensions on February 10, 2022. On May 4, 2023, Senate Majority Leader Chuck Schumer filed for cloture on Gallo's nomination. The Senate confirmed Gallo in a 52-44 vote on May 10, 2023. Gallo started at the position on May 15, 2023.
