= Randolph–Sheppard Act =

1936 United States federal law

The Randolph–Sheppard Act, 20 U.S.C. § 107 et seq., is a federal law which mandates a priority to blind persons to operate vending facilities on Federal property.

== History ==
The Act became law after it was enacted by the United States Congress and signed by President Franklin D. Roosevelt on June 20, 1936. The Act's primary sponsor was Representative Jennings Randolph (D-WV). Senator Morris Sheppard (D-TX) was the bill's major sponsor in the United States Senate. The Act was amended and updated significantly in 1974, with then Senator Jennings Randolph pushing the legislation through Congress almost singlehandedly. Among the people and organizations working to amend the Act were Durward McDaniel, National Representative of the American Council of the Blind, Irving Schloss, with the American Foundation for the Blind, and John Nagle, with the National Federation of the Blind. The 1974 amendments became law on December 7, 1974.

With his Special Counsel on the Senate Labor and Public Welfare Committee, Robert Humphreys, Esq., Senator Randolph developed numerous innovations in the Randolph-Sheppard program by expanding opportunities for blind vendors; entitling blind vendors and their State licensing agencies to income from vending machines on all Federal property; providing full due process to aggrieved blind vendors which enables them to resolve disputes with State agencies through hearings, arbitrations, and Federal court appeals; the creation of elected committees of blind vendors in each state with a Randolph-Sheppard program which are responsible for representing all the blind vendors in a state; creating a priority (rather than the mere preference that existed prior to 1974) for the operation of blind vending facilities on all Federal property. It was hoped and expected at the time the 1974 amendments became law that the blind vending facility program could double in size within five years. That hope was optimistic, and a number of impediments to the program's progress have emerged over the years. Senator Randolph was the Chairman of the Subcommittee on the Handicapped of the Senate Labor and Public Welfare Committee, and was responsible for the enactment of other important legislation to improve the lives of people with disabilities, including the Rehabilitation Act of 1973, and the Education of All Handicapped Children Act.

== Operation and management of the Randolph-Sheppard Program ==
The Randolph-Sheppard program operates in nearly every State through State licensing agencies as directed in the Code of Federal Regulations. National management and support are provided under the law by the Rehabilitation Services Administration in the Department of Education. There are some 2,500 blind vendors operating throughout the United States, managing businesses that run the gamut of food service and vending, from snack bars, gift shops, cafeterias, and highway rest stop vending operations, to major food service operations through military dining contracts. The gross national revenue from such operations now exceeds $800 million annually.
