= Skilcraft =

Brand of products largely made by disabled individuals

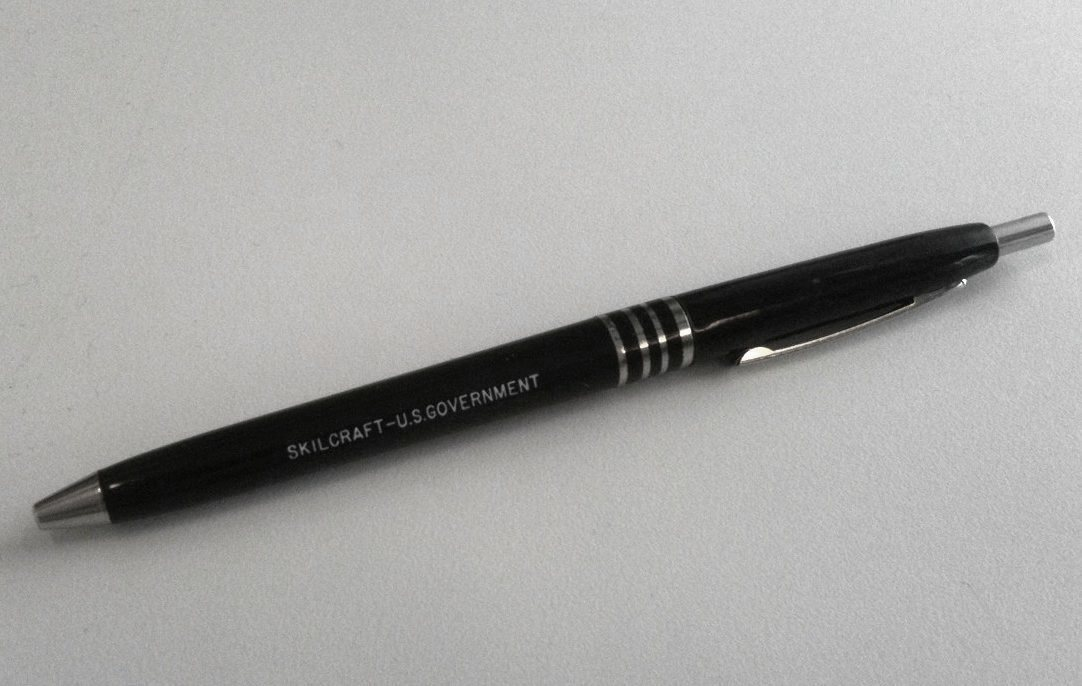
Skilcraft pen marked "U.S. Government"

Skilcraft, often stylized as SKILCRAFT, is the registered trade name of the National Industries for the Blind (NIB). Products made by Skilcraft are created largely by visually impaired or severely disabled individuals. Products bearing the Skilcraft brand are commonly used in United States federal government institutions such as the United States Armed Forces and the United States Postal Service. They are also commonly sold in U.S. military base exchanges and commissaries.

== History ==
In 1938, President Franklin D. Roosevelt signed the Wagner-O'Day Act which directed the government to purchase products manufactured by blind Americans. Robert Irwin, who was the executive director of the American Foundation for the Blind, and Peter Salmon, the assistant director for the Industrial Home for the Blind, promoted the bill in Washington, D.C. This act gave non-profit organizations for the blind the ability to sell to the federal government. It also provided the creation of a committee, known as the Committee on Purchases of Blind-Made Products, which had providentially appointed members representing various federal departments and private citizens.

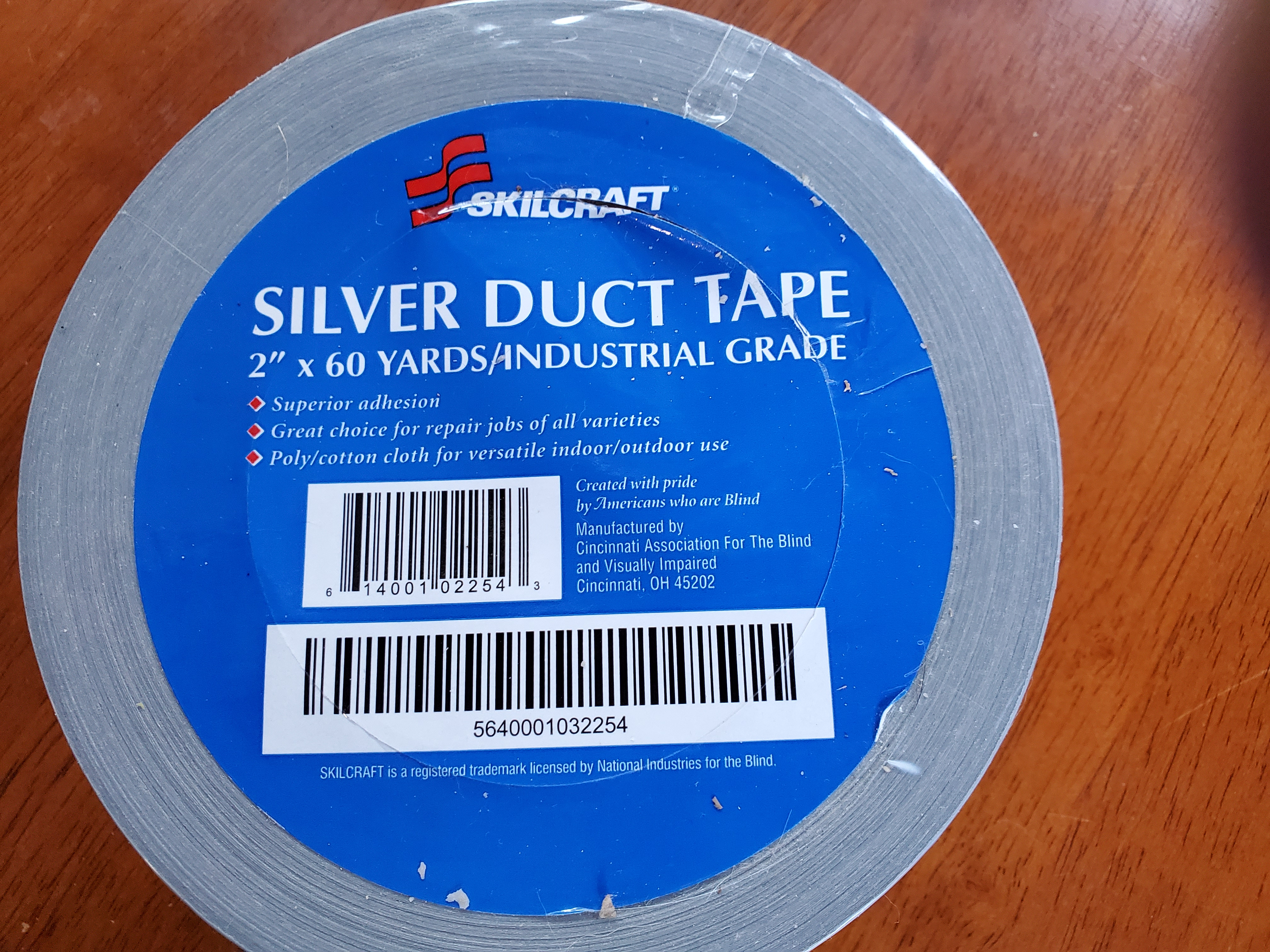
Skilcraft duct tape. The fine print at the bottom of label reads "Skilcraft is a registered trademark licensed by National Industries for the Blind".

The National Industries for the Blind (NIB) incorporated as a nonprofit organization on August 10, 1938, and was created as a result of the Javits-Wagner-O'Day Act (JWOD). NIB helps coordinate orders and allocate orders to different workshops for the blind. The first president of NIB was Chester C. Kleber, who held that position until 1960.

After World War II, the Committee on Purchases of Blind-Made Products decided that NIB should sell in commercial markets. In 1952, NIB created the brand name Skilcraft, which created a uniform label and emphasized the quality of the product. The brand name also allowed the company to be better able to expand into the commercial marketplace.

By 1960, NIB had 62 affiliated workshops. In 1970, black blind workers went on strike at a Skilcraft plant in Greensboro, North Carolina, citing poor working conditions, discrimination and low wages.

In 1971, Senator Jacob Javits introduced legislation extending the act to "individuals with other severe disabilities". The JWOD also gave workshops for the blind a "five-year priority on service contracts". JWOD also created a committee, the Committee for Purchase from People who are Blind or Severely Disabled.The committee would be made of 15 members appointed by the president, with each individual representing different federal agencies. The committee also had a budget, as described by JWOD.

The Committee for Purchase designated NIB and National Industries for the Severely Handicapped (NISH) to be the two central, non-profit organizations which coordinate government acquisitions from hundreds of independent organizations for people who are blind or severely disabled.

By 1998, there were 85 agencies who were associated with NIB.

== Skilcraft products ==
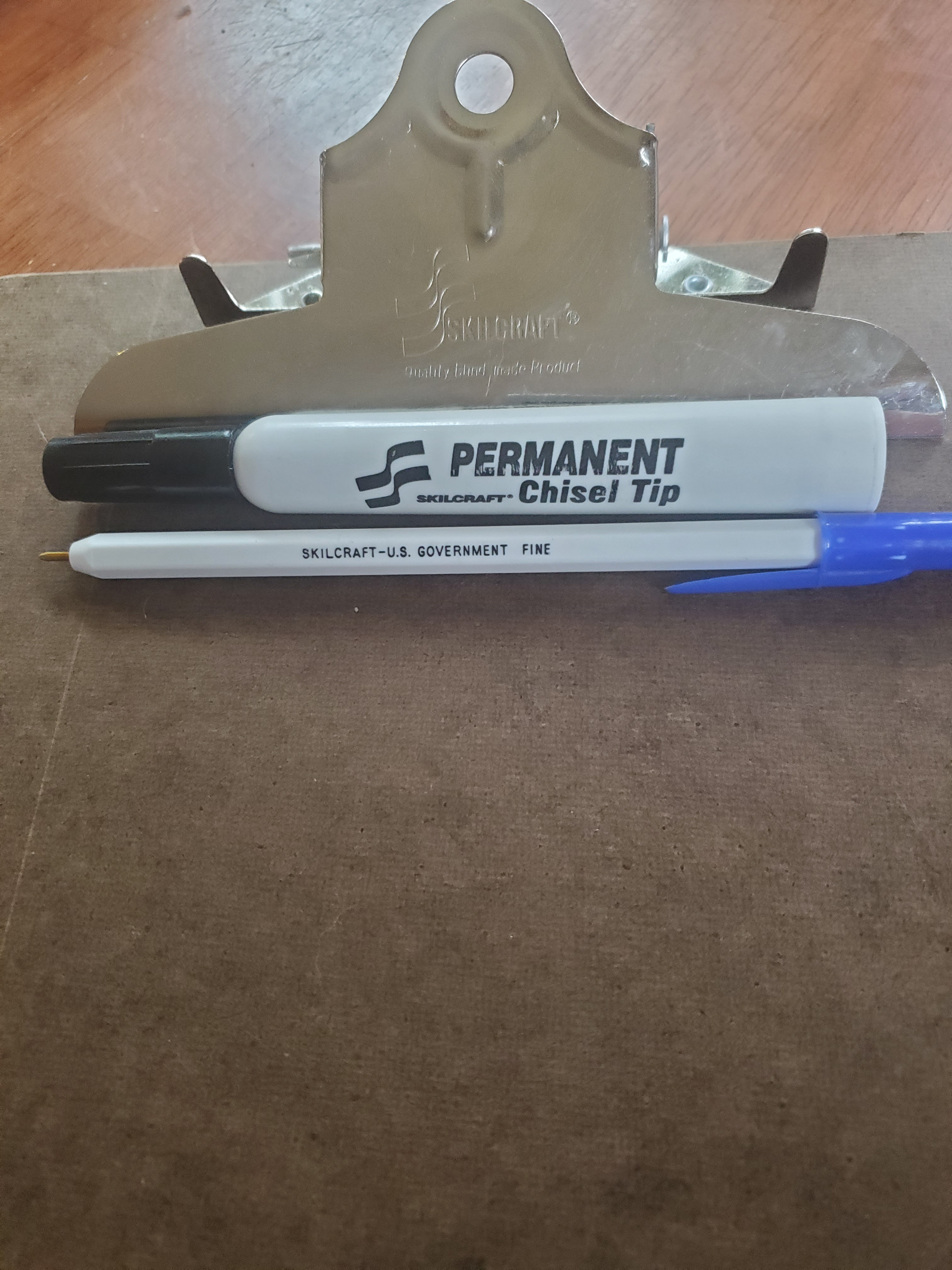
Government-issue pen, marker and clipboard made by Skilcraft

The first products manufactured under the program were mops and brooms for cleaning government offices. The federal government awarded around $220,000 in contracts to 36 workshops to manufacture the mops and brooms. By 1939, NIB expanded to sell pillowcases, sanitary swabs, and fiber door mats.

Later, pens and office supplies were introduced. NIB supplied the government with 70 million ballpoint pens a year by 1969. These pens have requirements, including the ability to "write continuously for a mile and in temperatures up to 160 degrees and down to 40 degrees below zero." The ballpoint pen contract helped create jobs for 125 new workers with disabilities. By 2014, sales of the pens reached around five million dollars, with 60% of purchases from the U.S. military.

In 1990, there were 400 different items added to the list of items manufactured. In 2015, Skilcraft introduced a new line of products which included screwdrivers and socket wrenches.

As of 2013, the Skilcraft brand encompassed more than 3,500 products including office supplies, janitorial equipment, uniforms, and hospital supplies. Skilcraft also provided services, such as call centers, on a contract basis to government agencies.

== Employing the blind ==
Nearly 70% of blind individuals in the United States who are of working age are unemployed. Being able to work allows the blind to be both self-supporting and able to support others. The Skilcraft trade helps employ more than 5,000 blind Americans working for local agencies in 44 states. Affiliates who make the Skilcraft brand, such as Lighthouse for the Blind are able to pay their employees between $8 and $12 an hour, provide health insurance and 401(k) options.

== See also ==
- Javits–Wagner–O'Day Act
