= Holyoke, Massachusetts =

City in Massachusetts, United States

- City
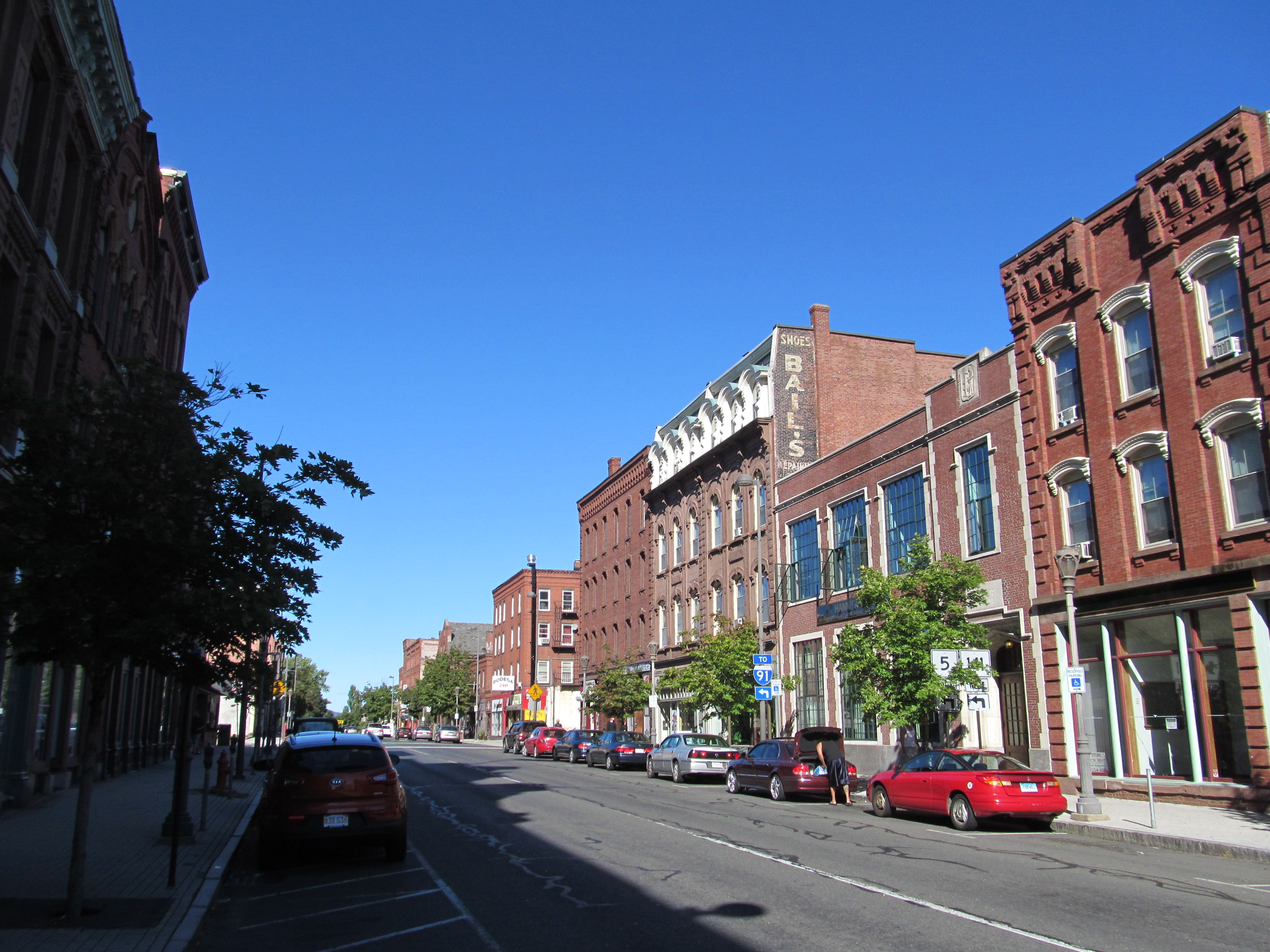
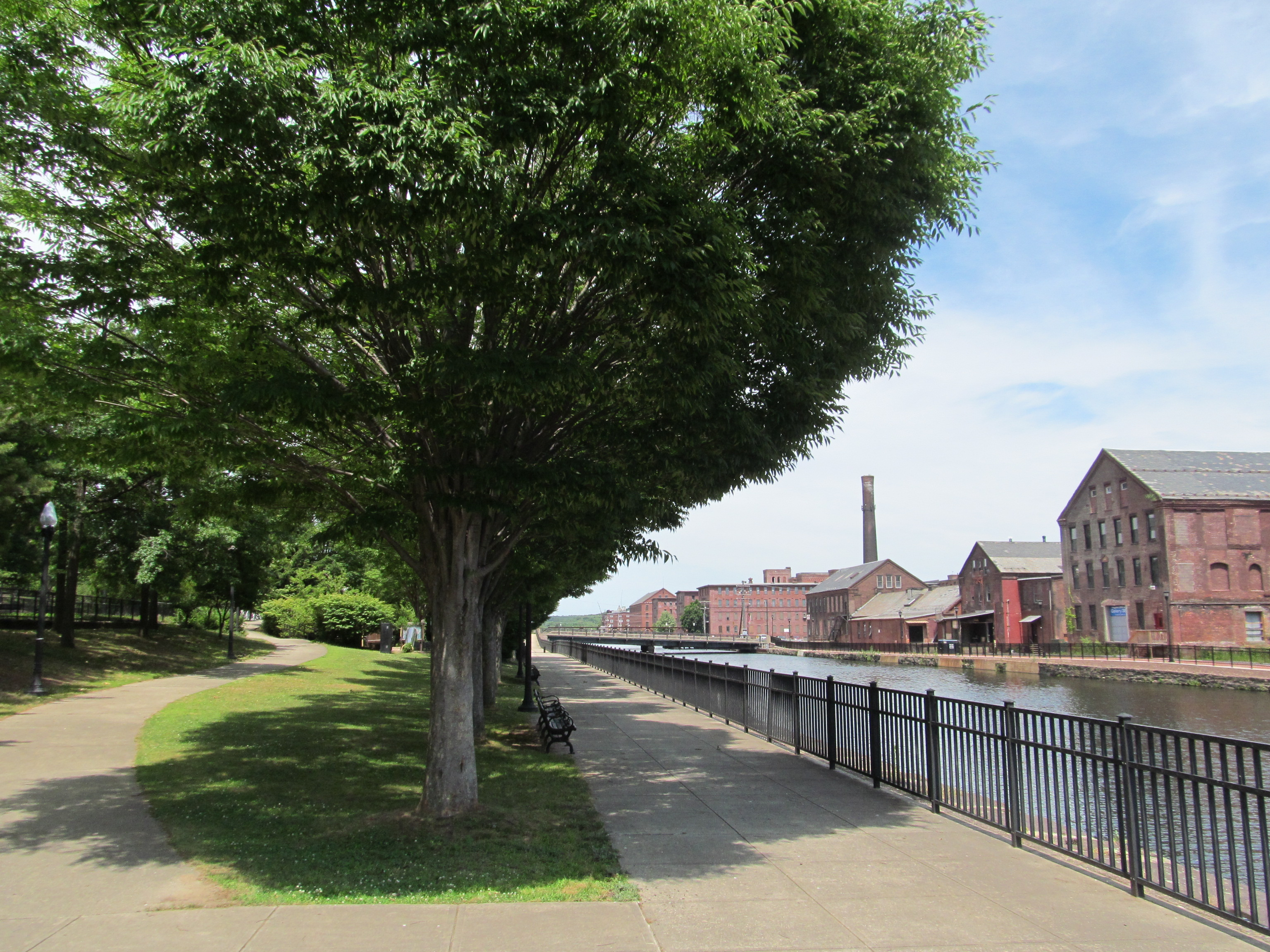
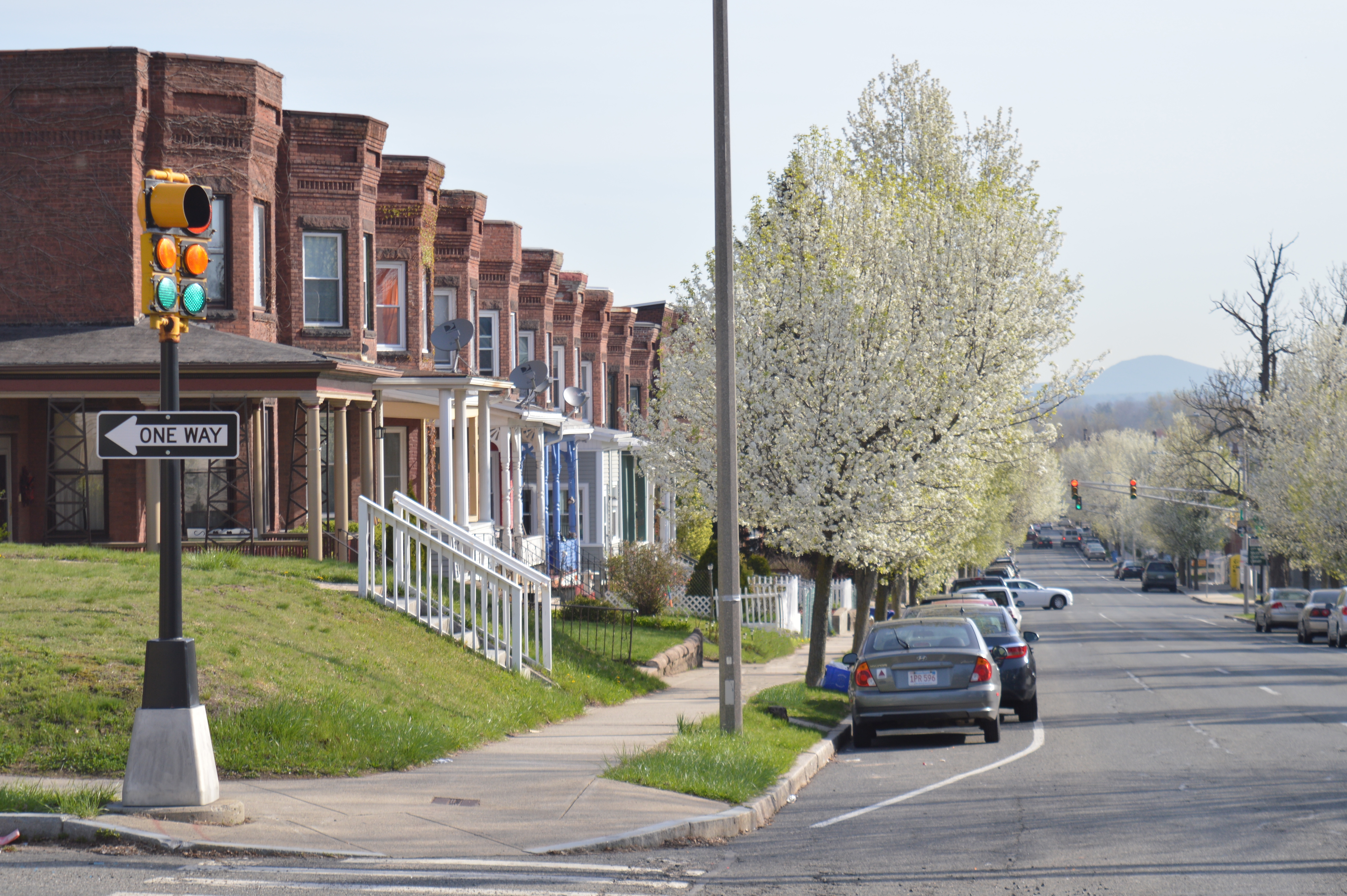
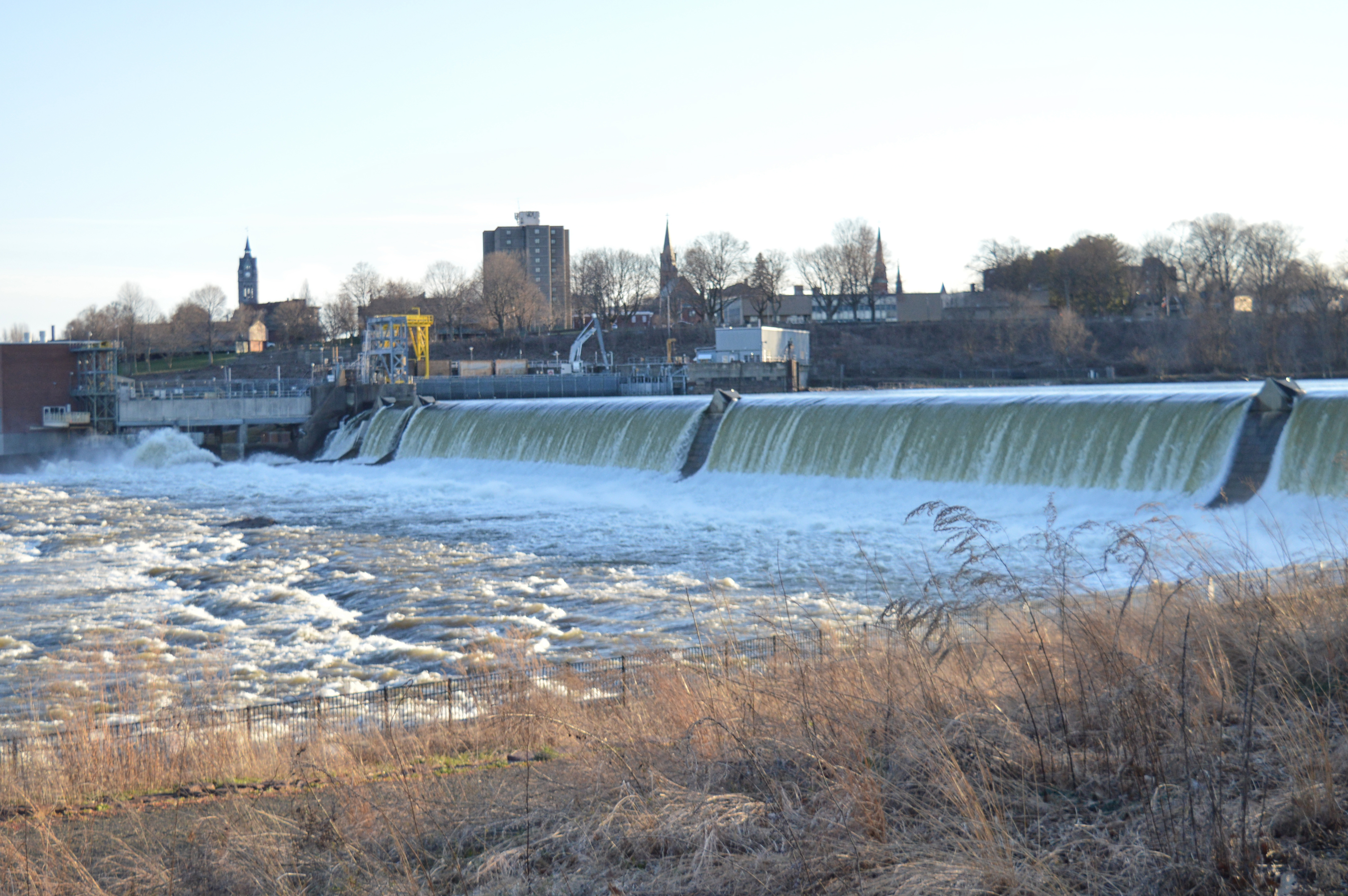
- Skyline of Holyoke with Mount Tom Range in the background North High Street Historic District Heritage State Park and the Canalwalk Beech Street Holyoke Dam

- Flag Seal Wordmark
- Nicknames: The Paper City; Birthplace of Volleyball; The Venice of America
- Motto(s): Industria et Copia (Latin) "Industry and Abundance"
- Location in Hampden County in Massachusetts

- Location in the United States Holyoke, Massachusetts (the United States)
- Coordinates: 42°12′26″N 72°36′27″W
- Country: United States
- State: Massachusetts
- County: Hampden
- Settled: 1655
- Incorporated (parish) (Note: Holyoke's boundaries, those of Smith's Ferry being an exception, were first defined as the 3rd parish of West Springfield; identified on maps as "Ireland" ot "3rd Parish" or referred to as "Ireland Parish," for the number of Irish families who had settled there.): July 7, 1786
- Incorporated (town): March 14, 1850
- Incorporated (city): April 7, 1873
- Founder: George C. Ewing; Boston Associates
- Named for: Elizur Holyoke

Government
  - Type: Mayor-council city
  - Mayor: Joshua A. Garcia

Area
  - Total: 22.80 sq mi (59.05 km^{2})
  - Land: 21.17 sq mi (54.83 km^{2})
  - Water: 1.63 sq mi (4.23 km^{2})
- Elevation: 200 ft (61 m)
- Highest elevation (Mount Tom): 1,201 ft (366 m)

Population (2020)
  - Total: 38,238
  - Density: 1,806.3/sq mi (697.43/km^{2})
- Demonym(s): Holyoker; Holyokian (rare)
- Time zone: UTC−5 (Eastern)
  - Summer (DST): UTC−4 (Eastern)
- ZIP Codes: 01040, 01041 (P.O.)
- Area code: 413
- FIPS code: 25-30840
- GNIS feature ID: 0617679
- Website: www.holyoke.org

Holyoke (/ˈhoʊljoʊk/) is a city in Hampden County, Massachusetts, United States, that lies between the western bank of the Connecticut River and the Mount Tom Range. As of the 2020 census, the city had a population of 38,238. Located 8 miles (13 km) north of Springfield, Holyoke is part of the Springfield Metropolitan Area, one of the two distinct metropolitan areas in Massachusetts.

Holyoke is among the early planned industrial cities in the United States. Built in tandem with the Holyoke Dam to utilize the water power of Hadley Falls, it is one of a handful of cities in New England built on the grid plan. During the late 19th century the city produced an estimated 80% of the writing paper used in the United States and was home to the largest paper mill architectural firm in the country, as well as the largest paper, silk, and alpaca wool mills in the world. Although a considerably smaller number of businesses in Holyoke work in the paper industry today, it is still commonly referred to as "The Paper City." Today the city contains a number of specialty manufacturing companies, as well as the Massachusetts Green High Performance Computing Center, an intercollegiate research facility that opened in 2012. Holyoke is also home to the Volleyball Hall of Fame and known as the "Birthplace of Volleyball" since the internationally-played Olympic sport was invented and first played at the local YMCA chapter by William G. Morgan in 1895.

While managing the Holyoke Testing Flume in the 1880s, hydraulic engineer Clemens Herschel invented the Venturi meter to determine the water use of individual mills in the Holyoke Canal System. The device, the first accurate means of measuring large-scale flows, is now widely used in a number of engineering applications, including waterworks and carburetors, as well as aviation instrumentation. Powered by the municipally-owned canals, Holyoke has among the lowest electricity costs in the Commonwealth, and as of 2016, between 85% and 90% of the city's energy was carbon neutral, with administrative goals in place to reach 100% in the future.

Pronunciation

The "L"-less or Elided Version ("Ho-yoke"): Long-time residents and locals in the Connecticut River Valley drop or weaken the middle "l" sound, pronouncing it HO-yoke or HOL-yoke.

== History ==
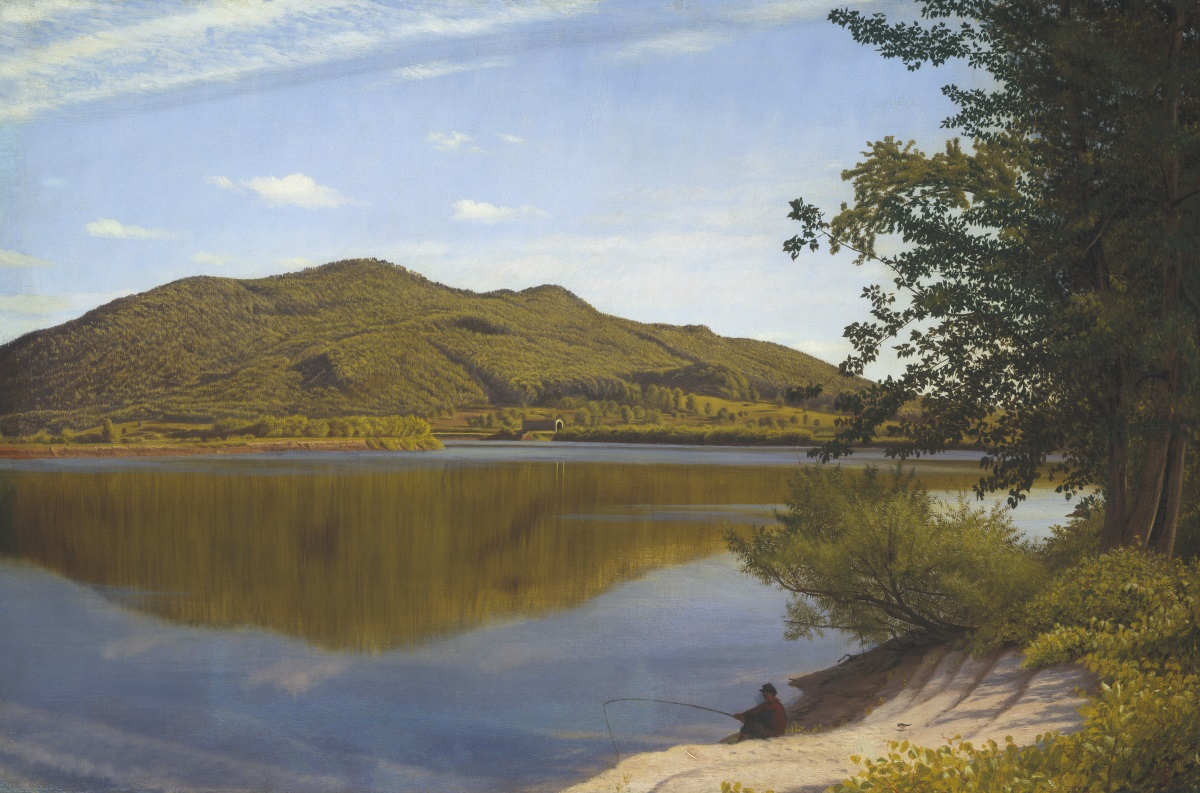
Mount Tom, c. 1865, by Thomas Charles Farrer, oil on canvas, as seen at the National Gallery of Art

The Indigenous people of Holyoke and South Hadley Falls were the Algonquian peoples. Though records are incomplete, the area was settled by the Pocomtuc, sometimes referred to as the Agawam or Nonotuck.

English colonists arrived in the Connecticut River Valley in 1633, when traders from the Plymouth Plantation established a post at Windsor, Connecticut. In 1636, Massachusetts Bay Colony assistant treasurer and Puritan iconoclast William Pynchon led a group of settlers from Roxbury, Massachusetts to the Valley to establish Springfield on land scouts had found to be advantageous for farming and trading. The settlement was built north of the Connecticut River's first major falls, Enfield Falls, where seagoing vessels had to transfer cargo into smaller shallops to continue northward on the river. Its proximity to the banks of the river made Springfield quickly become a successful settlement on the Bay Path to Boston, as well as the Massachusetts Path to Albany. Originally, the settlement spanned both sides of the river but was partitioned in 1774 with the land on the western bank becoming West Springfield, Massachusetts. The area, previously allotted to landowners on the east side of the river in Springfield, was settled by colonists by 1655 and included what is now Holyoke. Holyoke as a geographic entity was initially incorporated as the 3rd parish of West Springfield on July 7, 1786 and was called "Ireland" or "Ireland Parish." The area's first post office, "Ireland," was established June 3, 1822, with Martin Chapin as first postmaster; it was discontinued in 1883. Another, "Ireland Depot," was established February 26, 1847, with John M. Chapin as first postmaster, and assumed the town name upon Holyoke's incorporation. Though the name Hampden was considered, the area was subsequently named for earlier Springfield settler William Pynchon's son-in-law, Elizur Holyoke, who had first explored the area in the 1650s. Following land acquisitions and development by the Hadley Falls Company, the town of Holyoke was officially incorporated on March 14, 1850. The first official town meeting took place a week later, on March 22, 1850.

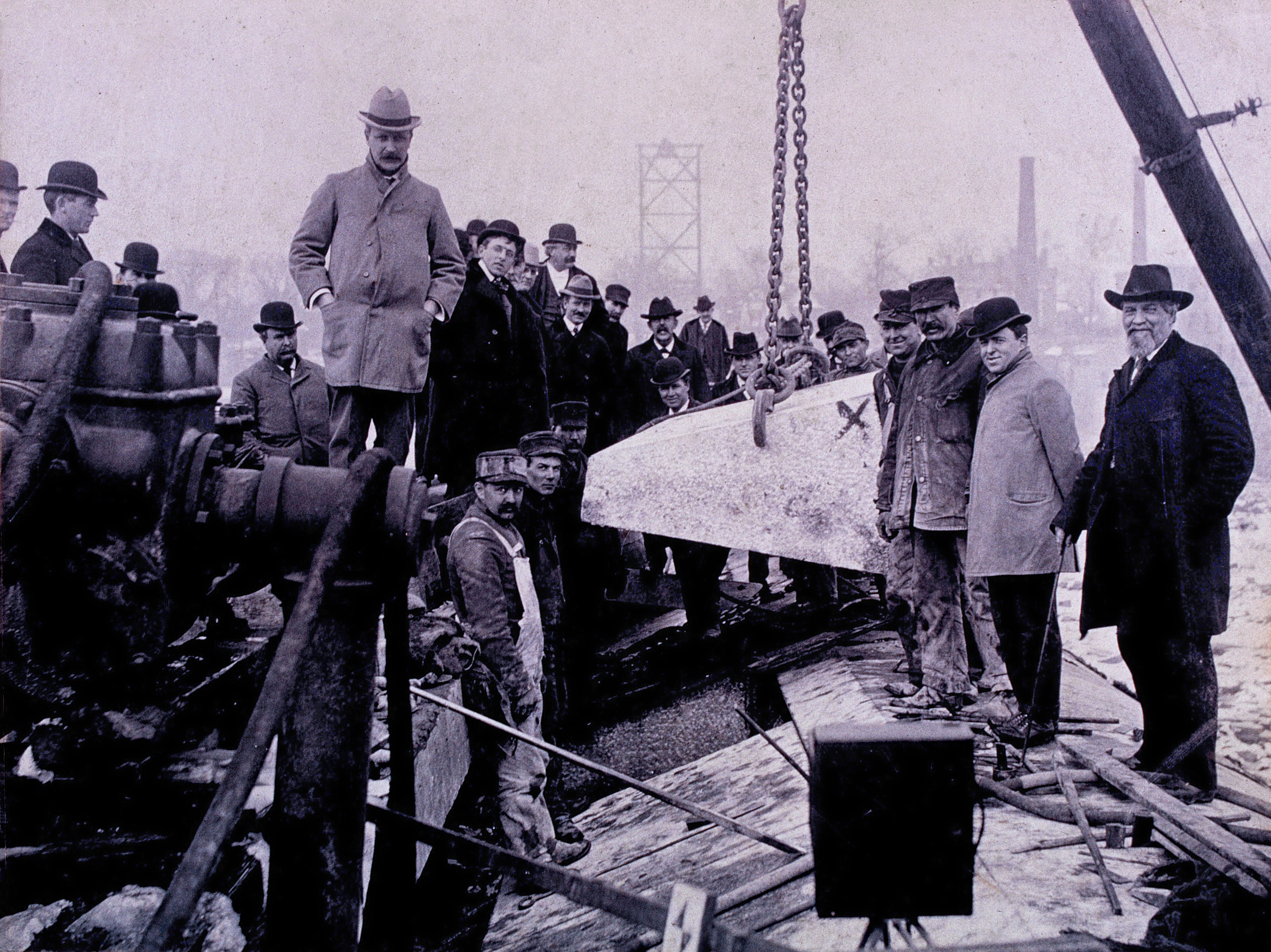
The last stone is laid at the Holyoke Dam, 3 p.m., January 5, 1900.

Part of Northampton, known as Smith's Ferry, was separated from the rest of the town by the creation of Easthampton in 1809. The shortest path to downtown Northampton was on a road near the Connecticut River oxbow, which was subject to frequent flooding. The neighborhood became the northern part of Holyoke in 1909.

Holyoke had few inhabitants until the construction of the dam and the Holyoke Canal System in 1849 and the subsequent construction of water-powered mills, particularly paper mills, the first and last to operate in the city being those of the Parsons Paper Company. At one point, over 25 paper mills were in operation in the city. The Holyoke Machine Company, manufacturer of the Hercules water turbine, was among many industrial developments of the era.

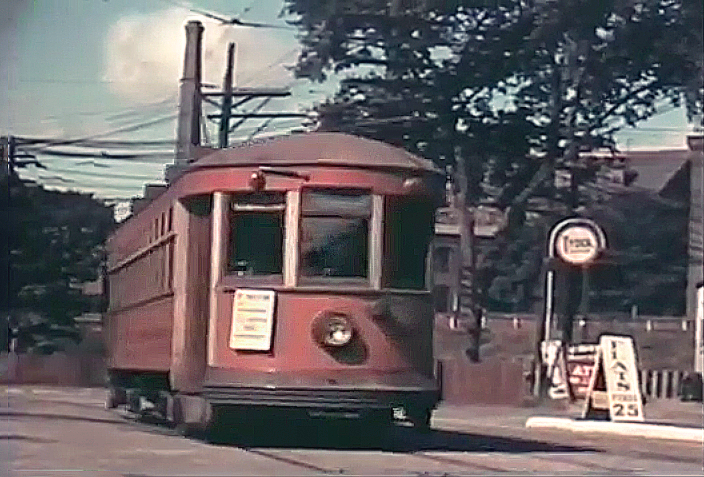
A Wason streetcar operated by the Holyoke Street Railway interurban system, shortly before its dismantlement in 1937. The railway was first in the nation to use thermite welding for its tracks.

Holyoke's population rose from just under 5,000 in 1860 to over 60,000 in 1920. The staggering growth caused the municipality to be officially incorporated as a city on April 7, 1873, only 23 years after its initial incorporation as the "Town of Holyoke." Later that year, the city elected its first mayor, William B. C. Pearsons, who, a quarter-century earlier, had established himself among the first lawyers in the city and had been the first editorial writer of the area newspaper of record, the Hampden Freeman, best known as the Holyoke Transcript-Telegram.

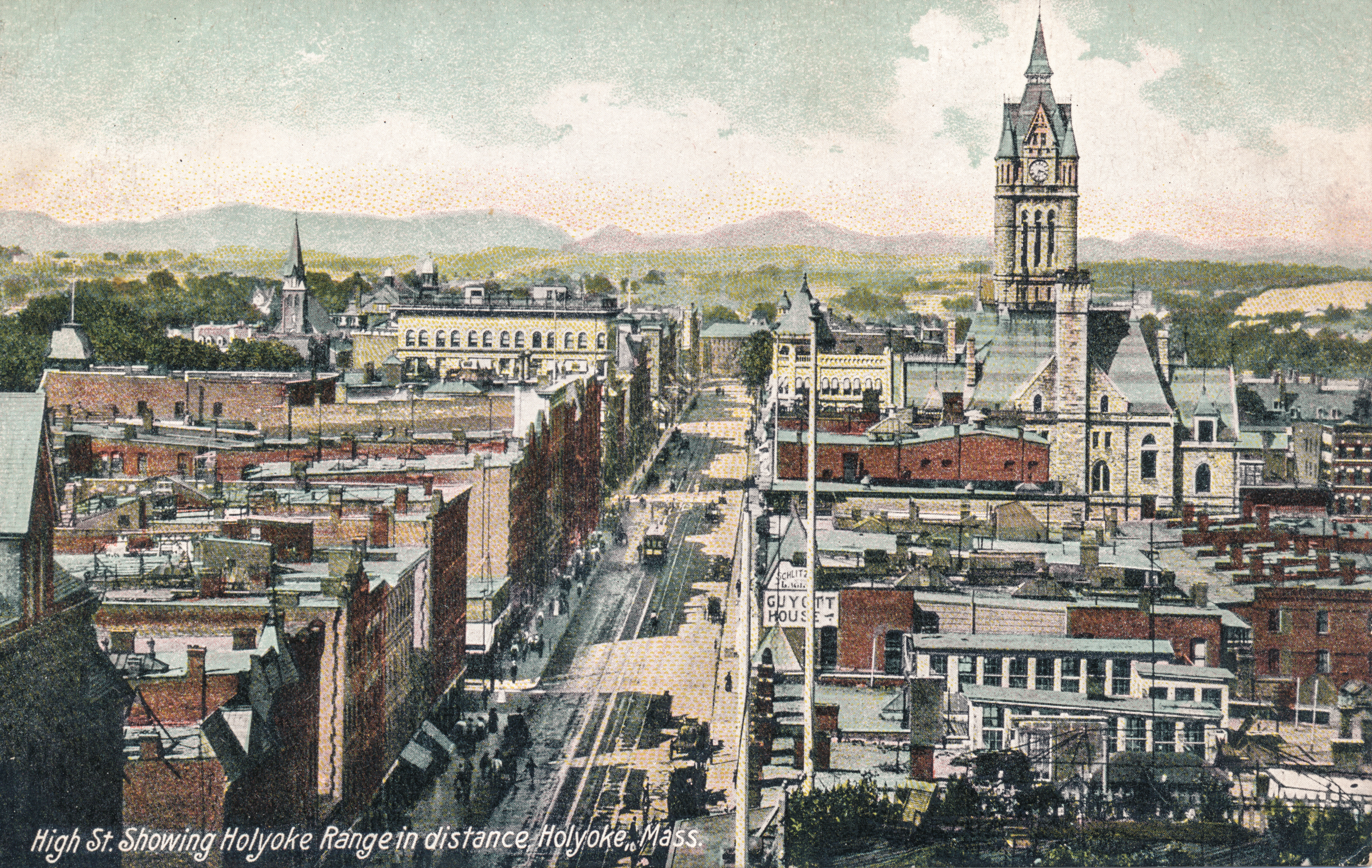
High Street, c. 1920

By 1885, Holyoke was the largest single producer of paper of any city in the United States, producing around 190 tons per day, more than double the next-largest producer, Philadelphia, producing 69 tons per day despite having a population nearly 40 times its size. Before 1900 Holyoke would produce 320 tons per day, predominantly of writing paper. In 1888, Holyoke's paper industry spurred the foundation of the American Pad & Paper Company (AMPAD), which as of 2007 was one of the largest suppliers of office products in the world. Holyoke was also previously the location of the headquarters of the American Writing Paper Company, a trust company established in 1899 with the merging of 23 rag paper mills, 13 of which were located in Holyoke. At one point the company was the largest producer of fine papers in the world, but leadership lacking technical knowledge of the industry led the company to fold by 1963. The availability of water power enabled Holyoke to support its own electric utility company and maintain it independently of America's major regional utilities. The city was thus a rare unaffected area in the Northeast blackout of 1965, for example.

In addition to developments in the paper and textile industries, a number of industrial inventions would arise out of the city in the late 19th and early 20th centuries. The first and most prominent hydraulic testing lab in the United States, the Holyoke Testing Flume performed 3,176 tests to establish turbine efficiency from 1870 to 1932. Among the flume's resulting developments were Clemens Herschel's Venturi meter in 1888, the first accurate way to measure large-scale flows, as well as the Hercules turbine by John B. McCormick in 1899, the first mixed flow turbine. Other pioneering developments included the first use of Hans Goldschmidt's exothermic welding process in the Americas in 1904, by George E. Pellissier and the Holyoke Street Railway. In electronics, the world's first commercial toll line, between the city's Hotel Jess and a location in Springfield, entered service on June 15, 1878. The city was also home to Thaddeus Cahill's New England Electric Music Company which, on March 16, 1906, demonstrated the Telharmonium, the world's first electromechanical instrument, a predecessor of the synthesizer.

== Geography ==
Media related to Maps of Holyoke, Massachusetts at Wikimedia Commons

Neighborhoods of Holyoke, Massachusetts

Holyoke is located at 42°12′11″N 72°37′26″W (42.203191, −72.623969). According to the United States Census Bureau, the city has a total area of 22.8 square miles (59 km^{2}), of which 21.3 square miles (55 km^{2}) is land and 1.5 square miles (3.9 km^{2}) (6.70%) is water. The city is bordered by Southampton and Westfield to the west, Easthampton to the north, Hadley, South Hadley and Chicopee as river borders to the east, and West Springfield to the south.

Holyoke is the location of East Mountain, the Mount Tom Range, and Mount Tom, at 1,202 feet (366 m) the highest traprock peak on the Metacomet Ridge, a linear mountain range that extends from Long Island Sound to the Vermont border. The most densely populated area, lying between the Mount Tom Range and the Connecticut River, is characterized by a series of terraces separated by wooded ravines, known as dingles, which drain to the river. Mount Tom is characterized by its high cliffs, sweeping vistas, and microclimate ecosystems. The 110-mile (180 km) Metacomet-Monadnock Trail traverses the Mount Tom Range and East Mountain. Fossilized dinosaur tracks and specimens can be found at the foot of the mountains because of their unique geology. A species of dinosaur, Podokesaurus holyokensis, whose fossils were first discovered across the river in South Hadley, was given its name for the area, and the city has in recent years passed measures to try to protect fossils in parks from theft or vandalism.

=== Neighborhoods ===
The city of Holyoke contains 15 distinct neighborhoods. Some, like Springdale and Oakdale, were conceived by individual developers as streetcar suburbs for mill workers in the 19th century, whereas others like Rock Valley and Elmwood were villages within West Springfield that predate the city. Additionally a number of names such as Ewingville and Elmwood Heights have been used historically but have become defunct as separate entities. In alphabetical order, Holyoke's neighborhoods are:

- Churchill – features Wistariahurst and the Holyoke Senior Center.
- Downtown – features City Hall and the Volleyball Hall of Fame.
- Elmwood – the city's oldest neighborhood; predating Holyoke, it was originally known as "Baptist Village"
- The Flats – features the Holyoke Canal System and many prominent structures built by the Hadley Falls Company in the mid-19th century, as well as the Holyoke Innovation District
- Highlands
- Highland Park
- Homestead Avenue – features the Ashley Reservoir, Holyoke Community College.
- Ingleside – features the Holyoke Mall and Nuestras Raices.
- Jarvis Avenue
- Oakdale – features Forestdale Cemetery, Rohan Park, and the Holyoke Medical Center.
- Rock Valley
- Smith's Ferry – features the Dinosaur Footprints Reservation. Annexed from Northampton in 1909.
- South Holyoke – features the Puerto Rican-Afro Caribbean Cultural Center and the Holyoke Turner Hall
- Springdale – features Springdale Park, the city's largest flagship park designed by the Olmsted Brothers
- Whiting Farms

=== Architecture ===
Media related to Buildings in Holyoke, Massachusetts at Wikimedia Commons

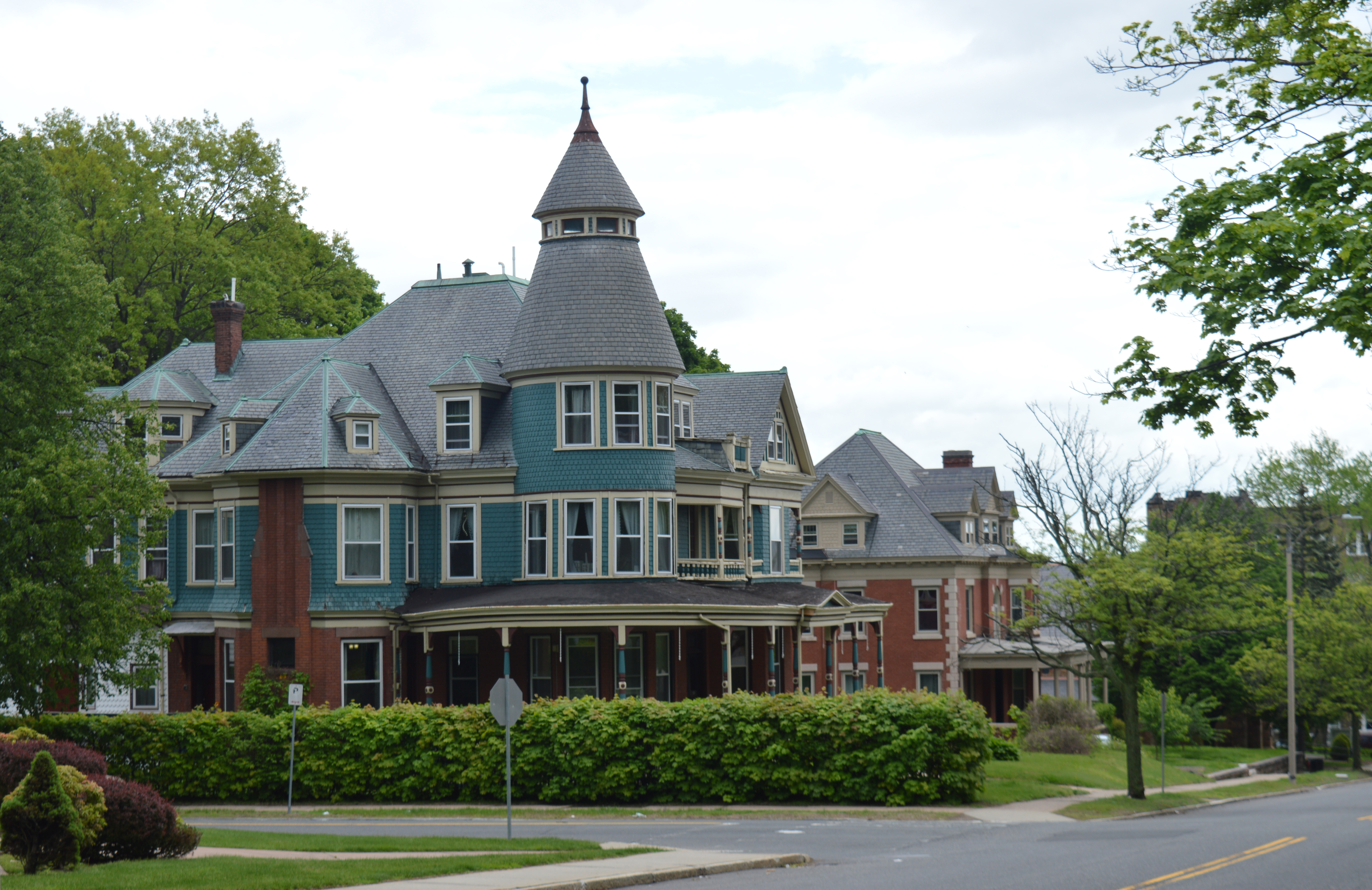
The Casper Ranger House, a rare example of a building designed by its namesake contractor, whose construction work encompassed many of Holyoke's neighborhoods as well as prominent buildings on Mount Holyoke College's campus.

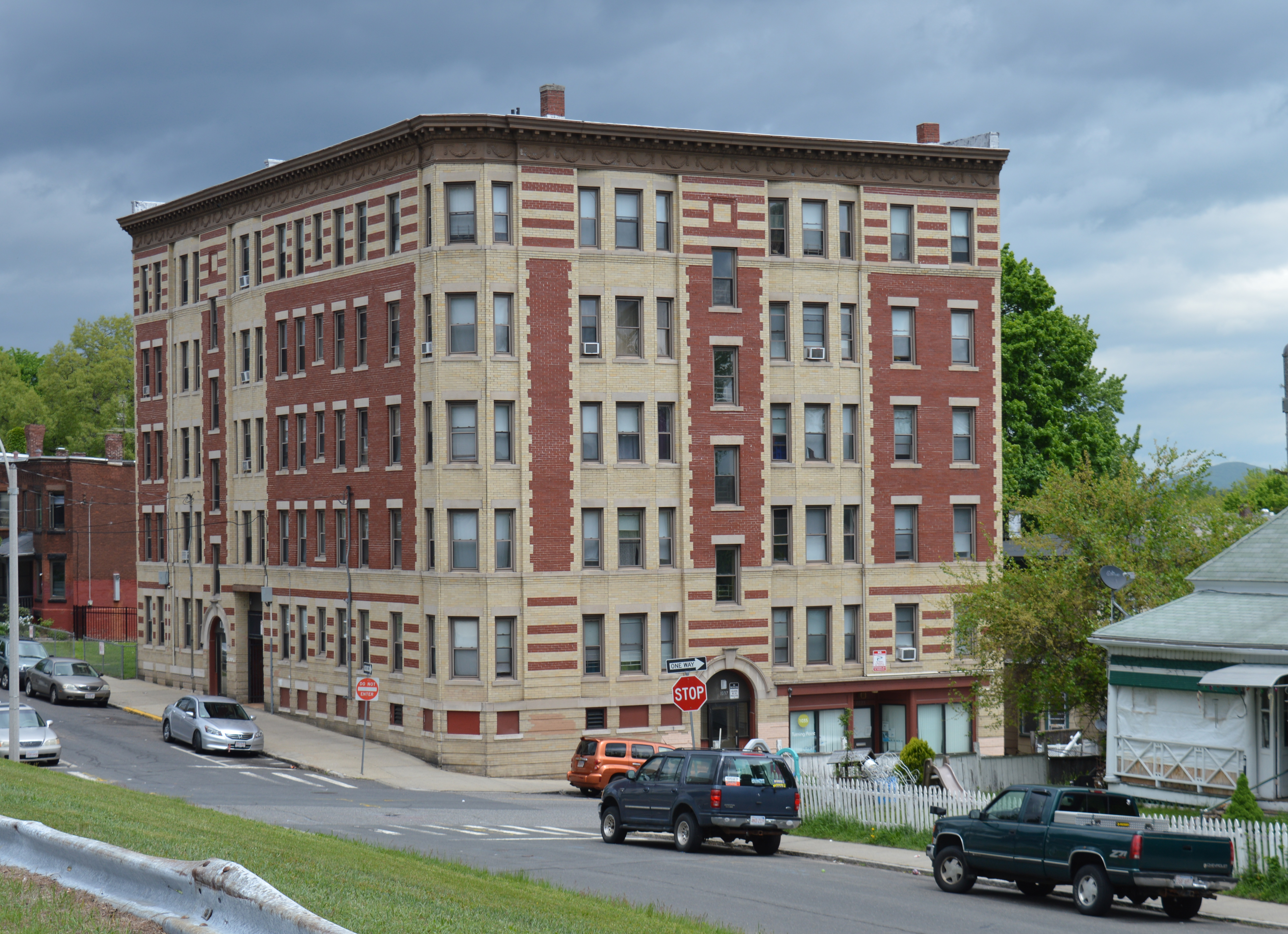
Gauthier Block, one of several Italianate brick tenements designed by architect Oscar Beauchemin

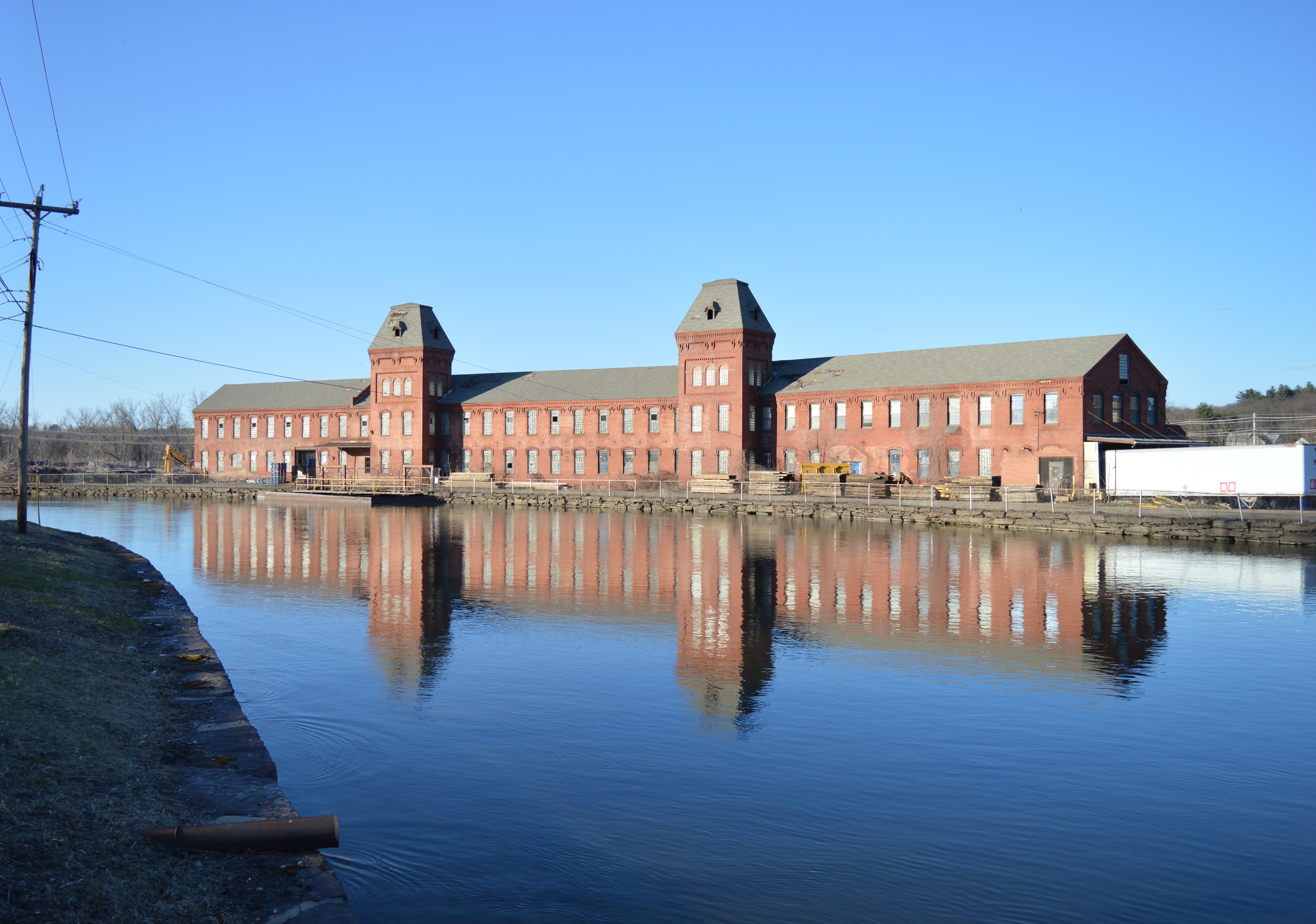
The Albion Paper Mill, designed by internationally renowned mill architect David H. Tower, c. 1869, an example of Second Empire industrial architecture in the city

Holyoke's industrial development in the late 19th and early 20th centuries led to a massive demand for new housing as the population grew by more than 1000% from the years from 1850 to 1890. Initially, the demand was filled by company housing, including such examples as the Hadley Falls Company Housing District, whose structures were built in 1847–1848. Gradually, the Holyoke Water Power Company began building housing on its land holdings to sell to working families, and by the end of the 19th century more private developments had begun to appear. Holyoke's architecture can be characterized by a mixture of Italianate, Gothic Revival, Queen Anne and Second Empire, with some Tudor Revival examples throughout its neighborhoods. The city is also home to at least two examples of works by national architects, the Holyoke City Hall designed in the Gothic Revival style by Charles B. Atwood, and the now-defunct Connecticut River Railroad Station designed by eminent architect H. H. Richardson. Philadelphia rowhouses are also a common feature among residential streets in downtown area.

Throughout its history, Holyoke has been home to a number of architects who shaped its unique urban landscape. The most prominent included George P. B. Alderman, who designed industrial buildings as well as the Holyoke Post Office, apartment blocks, and many of the city's iconic Victorian estates. Alderman started his independent practice after being an apprentice to James A. Clough of Clough & Reid, who is best known as the architect of the former iconic Mount Tom Summit Houses as well as the Holyoke Public Library. The work of architect Oscar Beauchemin shaped both the Main Street landscape of Springdale and many large multi-colored brick tenements built in mixed density housing can be attributed to him, often with Renaissance Revival architectural motifs.

Holyoke's own millwright engineers and architects David and Ashley Tower, doing business as D. H. & A. B. Tower, would go on to design more than 100 mills in the latter half of the 19th century. In many respects, they made Holyoke synonymous with its present-day handle "The Paper City." Holyoke's paper mills from the period were largely the work of the brothers, who designed mills on five continents and among the first of Kimberly-Clark and Crane Currency. In sum they would design 16 factories and mills in Holyoke and, including minor design roles, performed engineering work in some capacity on 25 of the city's in total.

=== Planned industrial community ===
The town seal used from 1850 to 1874; it contains a beehive, in heraldry symbolizing industriousness and cooperation.

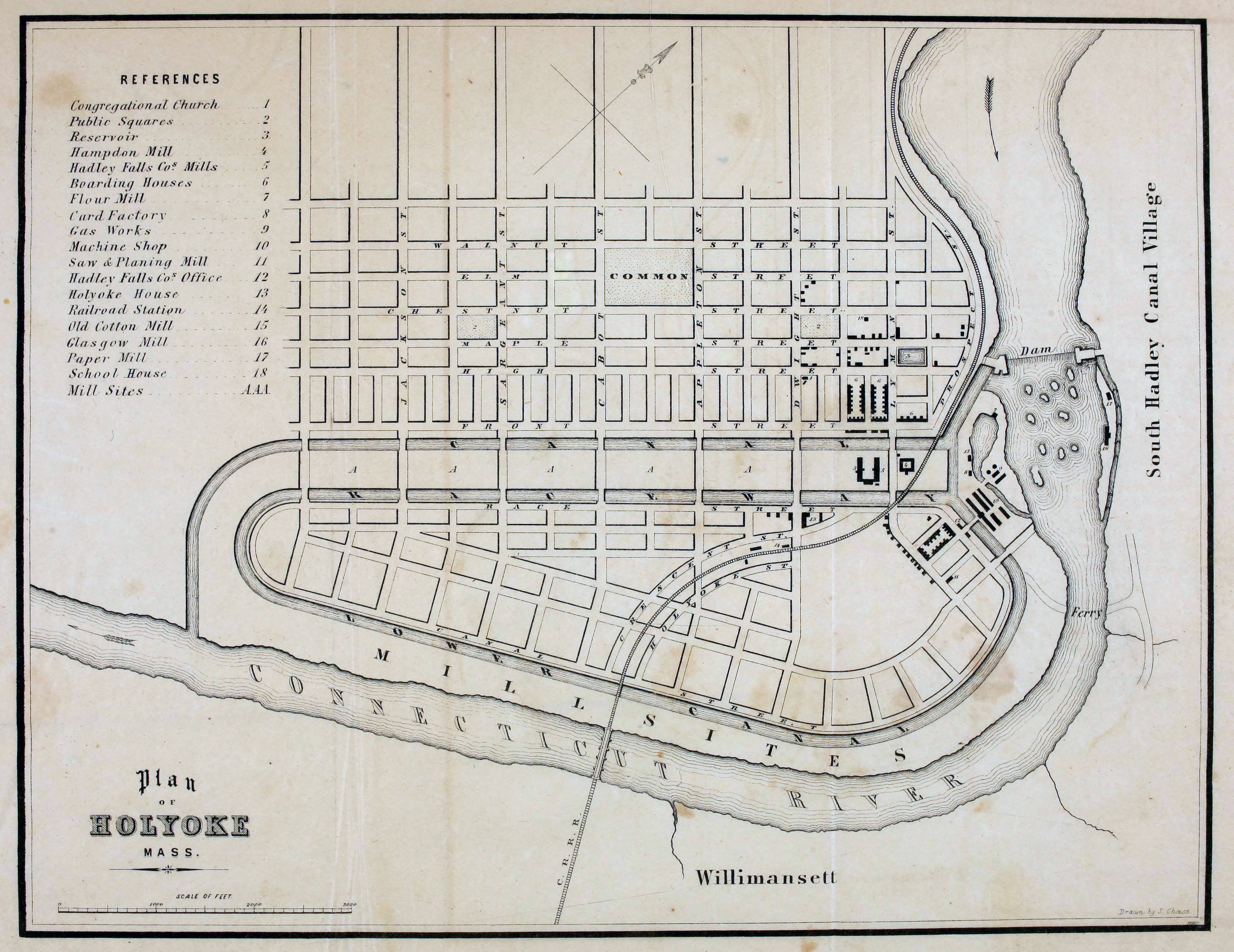
Early plan of Holyoke, its canal system and roads, drafted by the Hadley Falls Company in 1853 and designed by Philander Anderson and assistant Samuel Chase

As one of the first planned industrial communities in the United States, downtown Holyoke features rectilinear street grids—a novelty in New England. The street hierarchy was seen as a tool for economic development tool, as it lends well to high-rise buildings, and the surrounding canals could be landscaped for recreation. Whereas New York's Commissioner's Plan of 1811 lays out a system of numbered streets and avenues, engineer Philander Anderson laid out the names of routes in Holyoke's grid system alternating between tree species for North to South streets (Sycamore, Locust, Linden, Oak, Beech, Pine, Walnut, Elm, Chestnut, Maple), and the names of the Hadley Falls Company founders (Lyman, Dwight, Appleton, Cabot, Sargeant, Jackson), as well as several Massachusetts counties (Hampden, Suffolk, Essex, Hampshire, Franklin) for thoroughfares running east to west. The city's advantageous location on the Connecticut River—the largest river in New England—beside Hadley Falls, the river's steepest drop (60 feet), attracted the Boston Associates, who had successfully developed Lowell, Massachusetts' textile industry. From the late 19th century until the mid-20th century, Holyoke was the world's biggest paper manufacturer. The elaborate Holyoke Canal System, built to power paper and textile mills, distinguishes it from other Connecticut River cities. A series of railways running parallel to the canals also provided easy access to freight, a number of which remain operational today under the Pioneer Valley Railroad.

== Demographics ==
Historical population
Year	Pop.	±%
1850	3,245	—
1860	4,997	+54.0%
1870	10,733	+114.8%
1880	21,915	+104.2%
1890	35,637	+62.6%
1900	45,712	+28.3%
1910	57,730	+26.3%
1920	60,203	+4.3%
1930	56,537	−6.1%
1940	53,750	−4.9%
1950	54,661	+1.7%
1960	52,689	−3.6%
1970	50,112	−4.9%
1980	44,678	−10.8%
1990	43,704	−2.2%
2000	39,838	−8.8%
2010	39,880	+0.1%
2020	38,247	−4.1%
2024	37,838	−1.1%
Source: U.S. Decennial Census

=== 2020 census ===
As of the 2020 census, Holyoke had a population of 38,238. The median age was 39.0 years. 22.3% of residents were under the age of 18 and 18.0% of residents were 65 years of age or older. For every 100 females there were 88.9 males, and for every 100 females age 18 and over there were 84.1 males age 18 and over.

97.0% of residents lived in urban areas, while 3.0% lived in rural areas.

There were 15,504 households in Holyoke, of which 29.3% had children under the age of 18 living in them. Of all households, 28.8% were married-couple households, 20.8% were households with a male householder and no spouse or partner present, and 40.5% were households with a female householder and no spouse or partner present. About 33.9% of all households were made up of individuals and 13.8% had someone living alone who was 65 years of age or older.

There were 16,874 housing units, of which 8.1% were vacant. The homeowner vacancy rate was 1.2% and the rental vacancy rate was 4.7%.

Racial composition as of the 2020 census
Race	Number	Percent
White	19,984	52.3%
Black or African American	1,640	4.3%
American Indian and Alaska Native	262	0.7%
Asian	418	1.1%
Native Hawaiian and Other Pacific Islander	36	0.1%
Some other race	9,903	25.9%
Two or more races	5,995	15.7%
Hispanic or Latino (of any race)	19,597	51.3%

=== 2017 estimates ===
The racial makeup in 2017 was 84.9% white (33.0% non-Hispanic white), 21.8% black, 0.4% Native American, 1.6% Asian (0.4% Cambodian, 0.4% Indian, 0.3% Chinese, 0.3% Korean, 0.1% Pakistani), 0.1% Pacific Islander, 6.6% some other race, and 4.6% from mixed race. Hispanics and Latinos of any race were 51.2% of the population (40.7% Puerto Rican, 7.3% Dominican, 6.4% Venezuelan, 1.8% Mexican, 1.5% Colombian, 1.9% Cuban, 0.3% Salvadoran, 0.2% Argentine, 0.1% Honduran, 0.1% Guatemalan). The ten largest ancestry groups in the city were Irish (13.4%), Polish (8.3%), French (7.2%), German (4.4%), Italian (3.8%), English (3.6%), French-Canadian (3.3%), American (2.8%), Scottish (1.0%), and sub-Saharan African (0.9%). Immigrants accounted for 28.8% of the population. The ten most common countries of origin for immigrants in the city were the Dominican Republic, Poland, Germany, China, El Salvador, the United Kingdom, Colombia, Kenya, and Mexico.

=== 2010 census ===
There were 15,361 households in 2010, of which 34.9% had children under the age of 18 living with them, 30.5% were headed by married couples living together, 24.9% had a female householder with no husband present, and 39.3% were non-families. Of all households, 32.0% were made up of individuals, and 12.3% were someone living alone who was 65 years of age or older. The average household size was 2.51, and the average family size was 3.16.

In the city, 26.4% of the population were under the age of 18, 10.2% were from 18 to 24, 25.5% were from 25 to 44, 23.8% were from 45 to 64, and 14.2% were 65 years of age or older. The median age was 35.0 years. For every 100 females, there were 88.3 males. For every 100 females age 18 and over, there were 83.4 males.

The city reached a peak rank as the 82nd largest city in the United States by 1900, comparable to the standing of Buffalo (83rd) or Scottsdale (85th) among cities in 2018. Holyoke reached its peak population before the end of World War I, with an estimated 62,300 residents reported in 1913 by the school superintendent at the time and 65,286 for 1916 by the World Book. Following a period of de-industrialization after the war and into the end of the 20th century, the population briefly stabilized during the first decade of the 21st century before continuing to decline during the 2010s.

=== Employment and income ===
For the period 2013–2017, the estimated median annual income for a household in the city was $37,954, and the median income for a family was $46,940. Male full-time workers had a median income of $46,888 versus $41,406 for females. The per capita income for the city was $22,625. About 24.7% of families and 28.6% of the population were below the poverty line, including 45.6% of those under age 18 and 19.8% of those age 65 or over.

As of 2017, the city had the most recipients of Supplemental Nutrition Assistance per capita of any in Massachusetts, with 37% of residents receiving such benefits. Of all ZIP codes in the Commonwealth, including those of Boston, Holyoke had the third highest total households receiving such assistance, with the highest per capita of any of the state's 351 municipalities, representing 54% of all households. A 2020 study by the Urban Institute found Holyoke to be the least socio-economically inclusive city in New England for minorities, despite them representing the largest group demographically. The report found between 2010 and 2015 the racial educational attainment gap narrowed by 30%, but homeownership declined slightly, and the proportion of working poor marginally increased.

=== Ethnicity and immigration ===
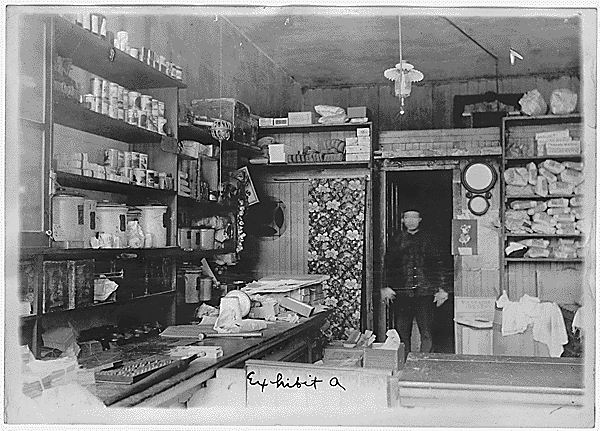
A High Street laundry shop owned and operated by Mr. Lee Wong Hing, a Chinese American merchant, c. 1904; populations of foreign-born nationals residing in Holyoke during the Second Industrial Revolution

Throughout its history Holyoke has undergone fluctuations in different foreign-born demographics. In the 1890 census, Holyoke had the third-most foreign-born residents, per capita, of any city in the United States, with 47% of residents born in another country, whicj was exceeded only by Fall River, Massachusetts and Duluth, Minnesota. Later waves of immigration led to significant growth and cultural influence of communities of Germans, Italians, Jews, Poles, and Scots into the first half of the 20th century and of Puerto Ricans, Greeks, Colombians, and Dominicans in the subsequent decades.

Historically, a city of working-class immigrants, the first wave of millworkers was predominantly Irish. Irish immigrants began settling in the region before the construction of the dam and industrialization that followed, granting the area the name "Ireland" or "Ireland Parish." While colonists had claimed lands by 1655, it was only in the following decade that homesteads would appear. Traditional accounts refer to John Riley as the first permanent settler of Holyoke, but while Riley owned 28 acres along "Riley's Brook" (Tannery Brook in modern-day Ingleside), his daughters Mary and Margaret, and their Irish Protestant husbands, Joseph Ely and William MacCranny, first resided there beginning in 1667. By the time West Springfield was partitioned in 1707, a number of Irish families had moved to the Parish. With the emergence of Holyoke's industrial base, a new wave of Irish Catholic immigration occurred and by 1855 a third of residents were of Irish heritage. Holyoke's Irish roots are celebrated today in its annual St. Patrick's Day Parade.

In the 1850s, mill owners began to recruit French Canadians, regarded as docile and less likely to create labor unions because of their agrarian backgrounds and the anti-unionism promoted by Québecois clergy at the time. Many Québecois workers were first recruited by Nicholas Proulx (anglicized as Prew) who hailed from Saint-Ours, Quebec and arrived in Holyoke in 1856. He and his sons would import a number of line workers for Lyman Mills, including his son John J. Prew, who founded Springdale and became the first French member of the city council, then the board of aldermen. By 1900, one in three residents were French or French Canadian descent, and when the city reached its peak population of 62,300 in 1913, the number had become one in four, and the city contained the 7th largest French or French Canadian immigrant population in the country and exceeding Chicago's at the time. By 1980, reflecting economic and cultural changes, that was only 10% of the population, a similar figure to those who identified as French or French Canadian in the 2010 census.

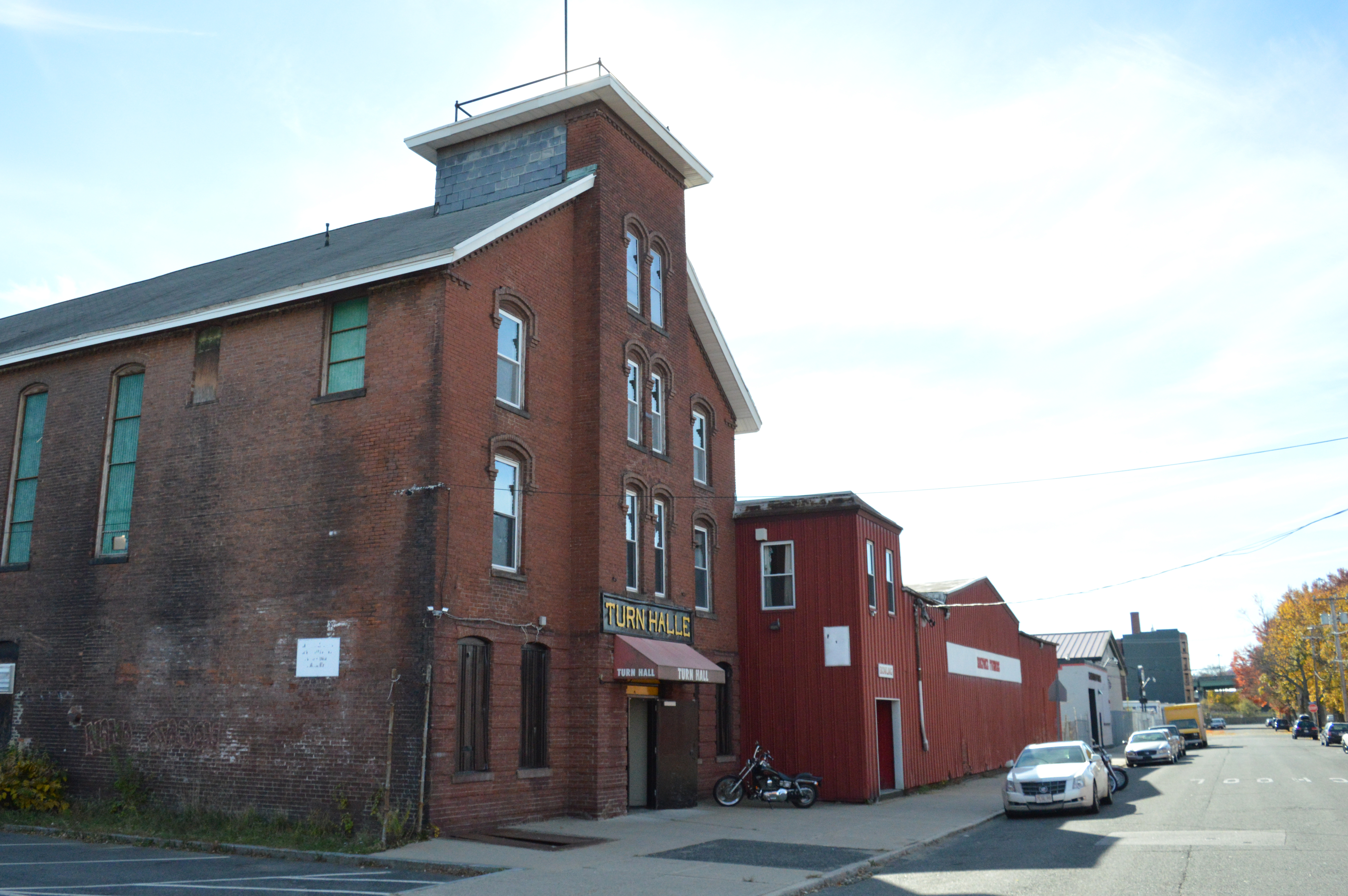
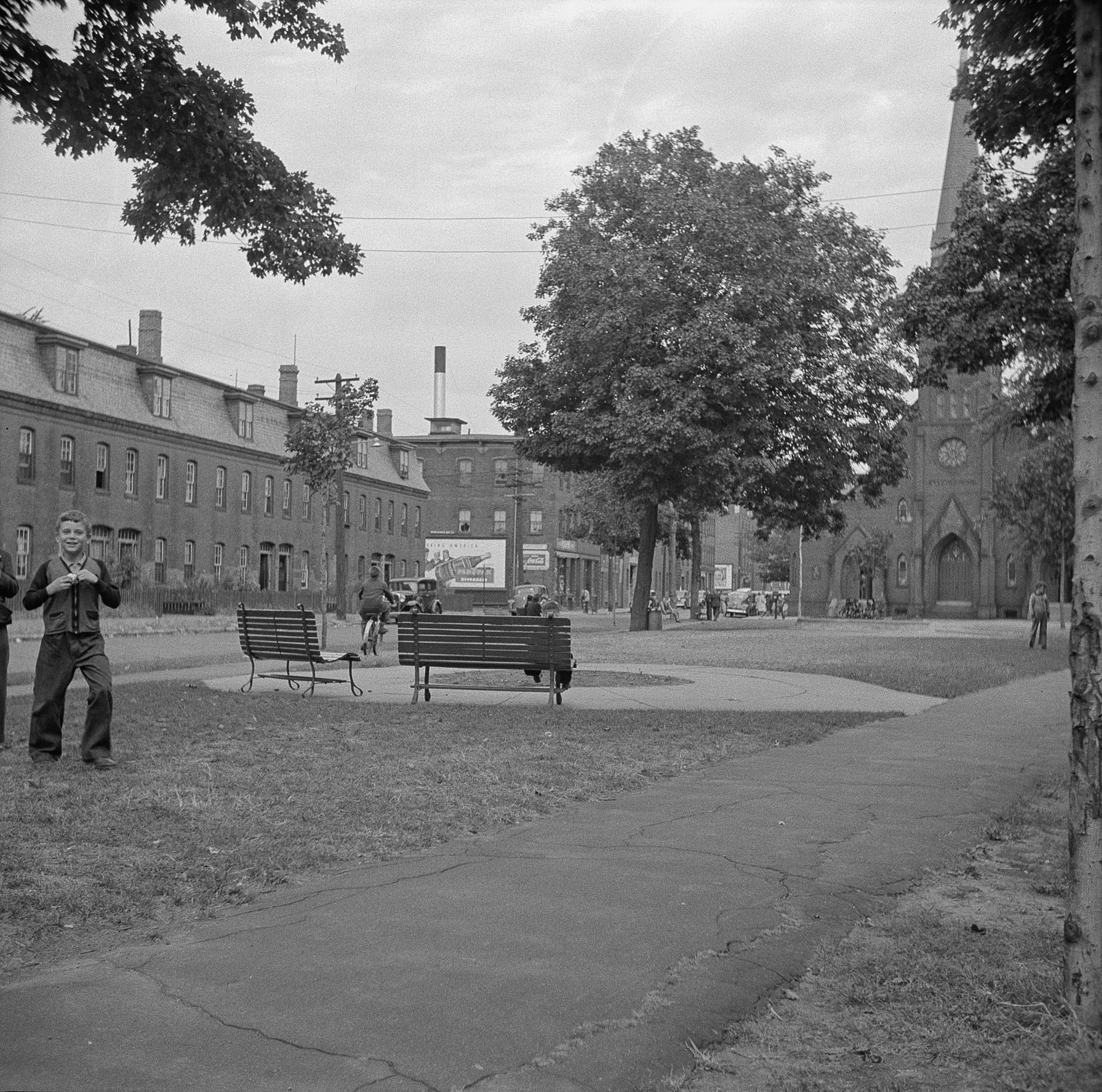
The Holyoke Turner Hall (2018), a vestige of the former Germania Mills einwandererkolonie (lit. immigrant colony); the former Germania Park with worker housing and Lutheran Church (1941), now Bonin Field

Beginning at the end of World War II, an influx of Puerto Ricans and other Latino groups began to migrate to the Northeast United States, driven largely by the Farm Labor Program initiated by the US Department of Labor. Not unlike the Bracero program, the agency recruited Puerto Rican laborers in the following decades to work on agricultural land in the continental United States. In the case of Holyoke, many worked on valley tobacco farms, and arrived in the city in search of better job opportunities at the mills as previous generations had. The first permanent Puerto Rican resident was said to have been Domingo Perez; a landlord who later became among the first to be appointed in city government, he was reported to have arrived in Holyoke around 1955. By 1970 the number of Puerto Rican residents numbered around 5,000; however, by then, many faced a city economy in free fall. Holyoke's mills had closed because of the changing economic landscape of early globalization and deindustrialization; from 1955 to 1970, one of every two industrial jobs vanished. Despite economic and social difficulties the population grew significantly during the 1980s, and from 1990 to 2016, the buying power of the Latino community at-large increased by nearly 300%. Today, Latinos form the city's largest minority group, with the largest Puerto Rican population per capita of any American city outside Puerto Rico proper, at 44.7%. The entire Latino population of Holyoke, as of the 2010 census, was 19,313, or 48.4% of the city's population of 39,880.

=== Religion ===
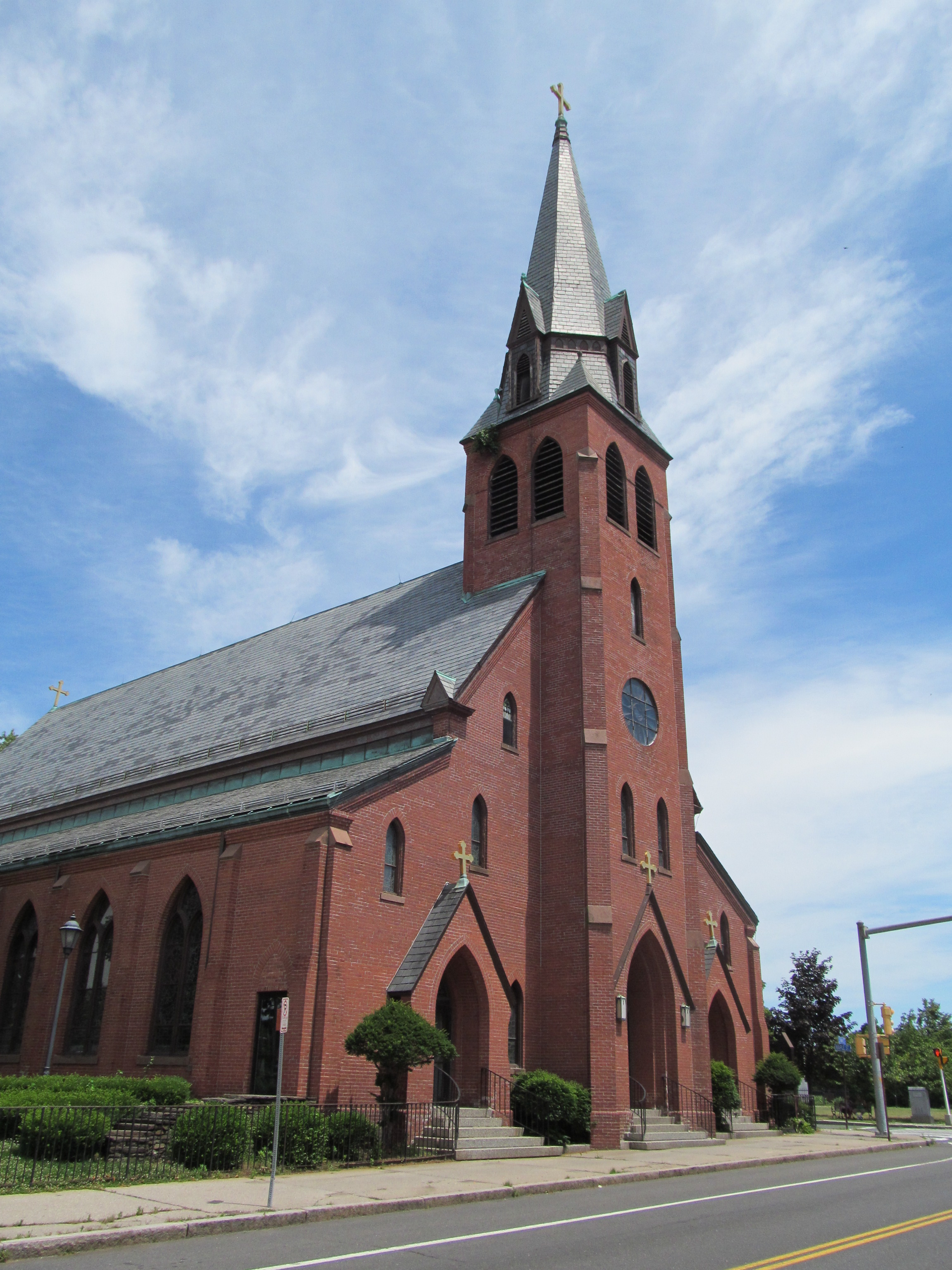
Mater Dolorosa Parish

Holyoke is home to houses of worship for numerous denominations of Christianity and Judaism. One of the city's oldest monikers was Baptist Village as the first congregation established there was the First Baptist Church of Holyoke, which first erected a meetinghouse in 1792, traces its origins to five baptisms on the shores of the Connecticut in 1725, and continues as a congregation today.

As of 2010 an estimated 60% of Holyoke was religious, with the largest demographic being Christians, more specifically Roman Catholics, who comprised 49% of the city's population. In 2011, two Catholic parishes, Holy Cross and Mater Dolorosa were merged into Our Lady of the Cross Parish. A number of other Catholic parishes, including Our Lady of Guadalupe, St. Jerome's, Blessed Sacrament and Immaculate Conception Parish also reside in the city.

In addition to its parishes, the city has a number of convents of sisters including the Sisters of Providence of Holyoke in Ingleside, the Sisters of St. Joseph of Springfield who maintain group homes there, and the Sisters of St. Francis of Assisi in Highland Park.

Protestant congregations have played a significant role in Holyoke's civic life since its founding, including the First Congregational Church of Holyoke, founded in 1850, the First Lutheran Church of Holyoke, founded in 1867, and the United Methodist Church of Holyoke, South Hadley, and Granby, which meets in South Hadley, which was founded in 1810.

A Greek Orthodox church, Holy Trinity Greek Orthodox Church, has also existed in the city since its founding in 1917.

Holyoke is also home to a significant Jewish population. As one of 35 municipalities in Massachusetts with more than 100 Jewish residents, Holyoke is home to an estimated 1,300 residents observing the faith and two synagogues, Congregation Sons of Zion, a Conservative congregation, and Congregation Rodphey Sholom, practicing Orthodoxy. Both congregations originated in the 19th century, with Rodphey Sholom founded in 1903 but tracing its heritage to the Paper City Lodge of the Order Brith Abraham, founded in 1899, and Sons of Zion being founded in 1901. Today both congregations hold joint services during certain holidays.

== Economy ==
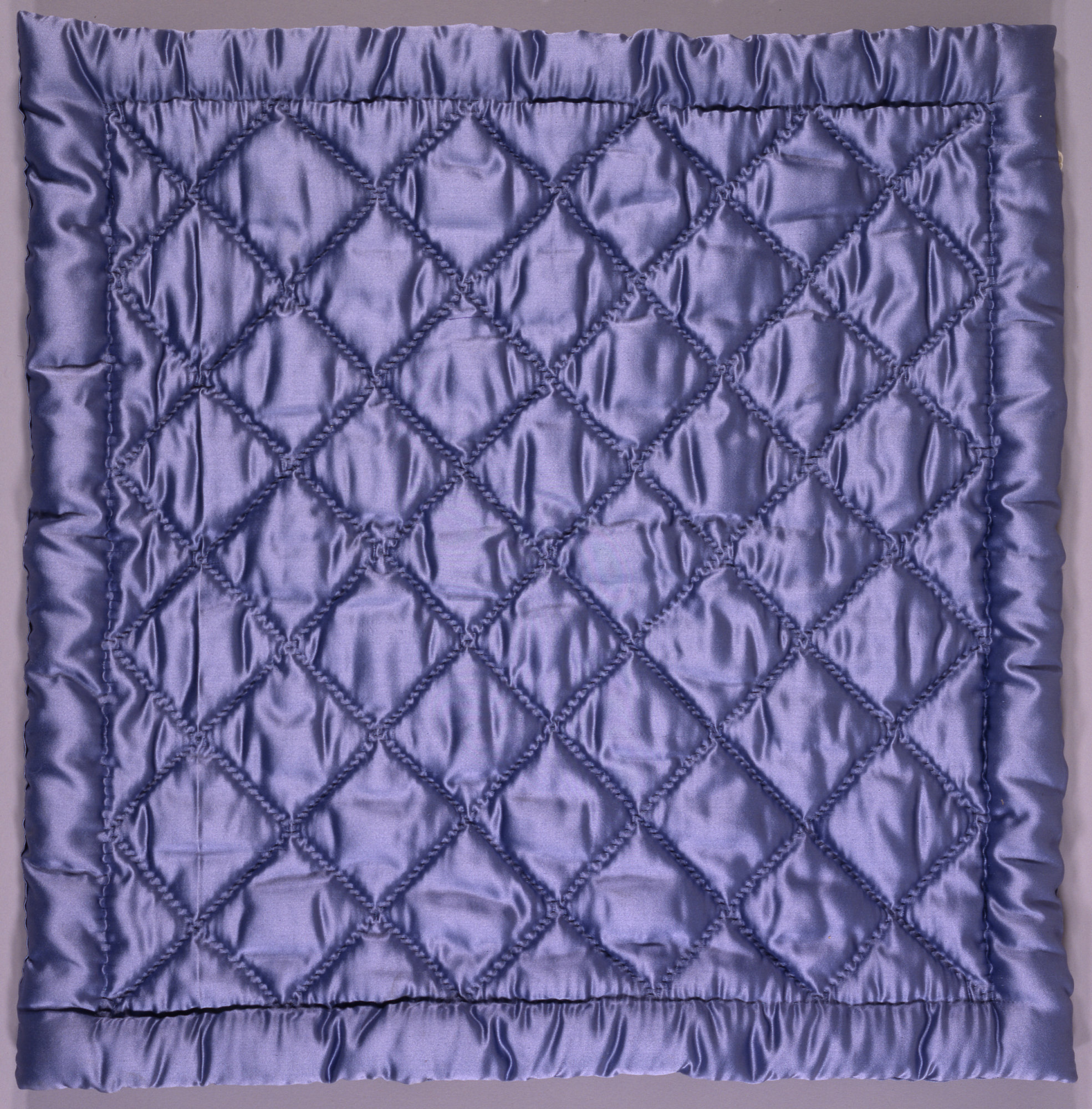
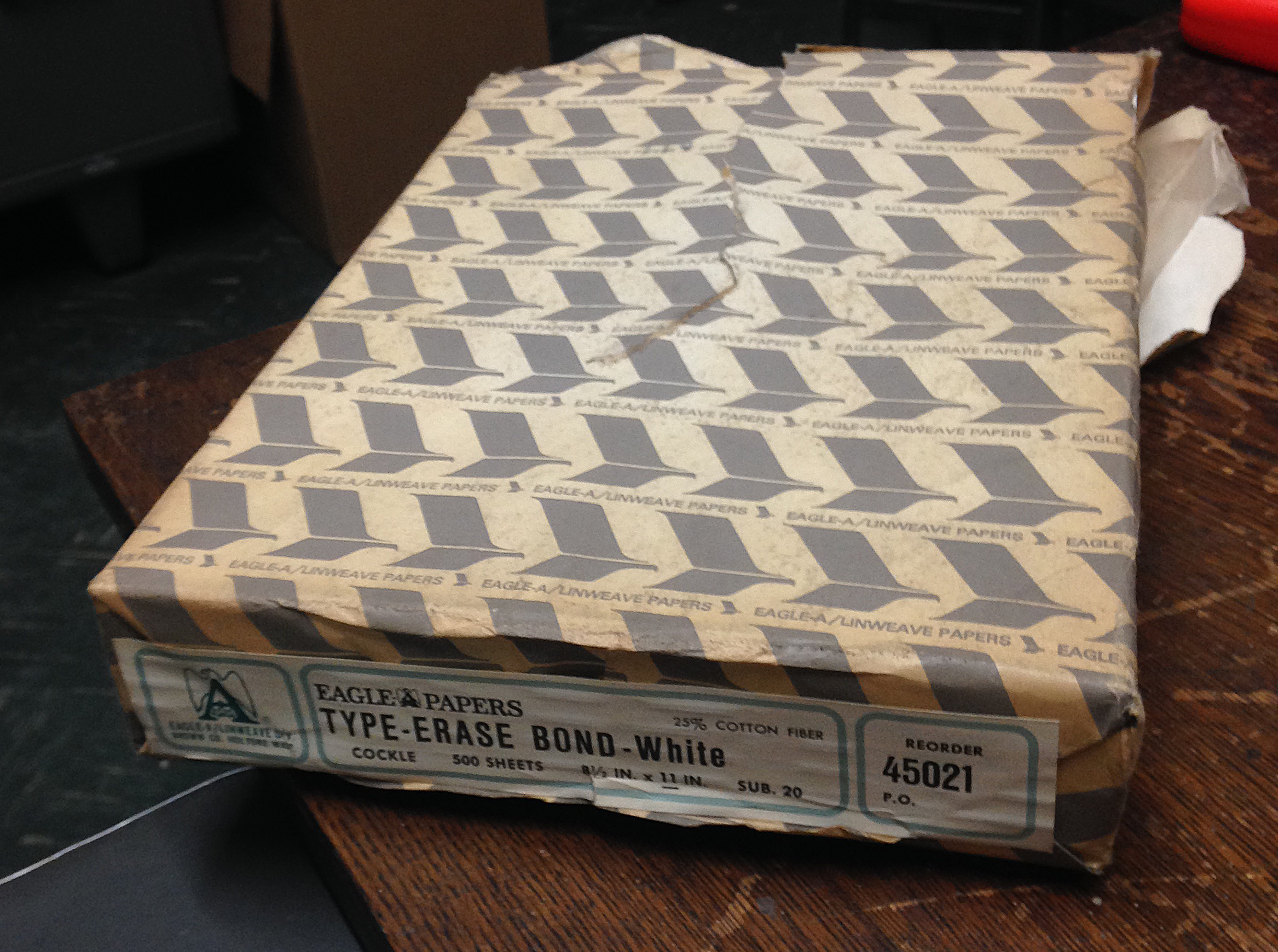
From top to bottom: A sample of "Skinner's Satins" silk in the Smithsonian, produced by William Skinner and Sons, c. 1950. A ream of Holyoke "Eagle A" paper made by the American Writing Paper Company, and subsequently the Brown Company; c. 1970.

=== Manufacturing ===
Known by its moniker, the "Paper City," Holyoke had its economic base being developed almost entirely around the paper industry for the better part of the late 19th and early 20th centuries. At one time, the city was reportedly the largest producer of stationery, writing, and archival goods in the world. While writing paper production has left the city, Holyoke is still home to a number of specialty paper manufacturers and converters, including companies like Eureka Lab Book, Hampden Paper, Hazen Paper, United Paper Box, and University Products. Several international companies also maintain manufacturing facilities in the area, including a power transmission factory for U.S. Tsubaki in Springdale, and a Sonoco cardboard recycling plant in South Holyoke. Some former mills have in the past been used as incubators for new manufacturing businesses as well; from 1973 until 1983, when it relocated to a newly constructed factory in Deerfield, Yankee Candle's first factory was located in one such building in the canal district.

Today the City of Holyoke has one of three foreign-trade zones in the Commonwealth, the other two being the Port of New Bedford and the Massachusetts Port Authority of Boston. Though the number of service-based jobs overtook Holyoke manufacturing jobs in 1972, the city is still home to an array of manufacturing concerns outside of the paper and textile industries, including several producing industrial machinery and components. Until 2017, its oldest manufacturer was the Holyoke Machine Company, which was incorporated in 1863, served large mills and factories with specialty roll parts and service, and manufactured a number of different products. At one time, the company produced the "Holyoke Hercules" model of water turbine, which served the city's industries on the canal system, and its shops previously cast bronze doors for the U.S. Capitol Building. Today the city is still home to a number of firms specializing in such equipment as medical devices, industrial vacuums, solid waste containers, plastics and rubber manufacturing, bookbinding agents and archival supplies.

In recent years, the city has also seen a handful of food manufacturing firms because of its proximity to large metropolitan areas like New York City and Boston. In 1996 the Paper City Brewing Company opened out of one of the former Farr Alpaca Company's facilities, following a period of financial difficulties in 2017, the brewery closed temporarily, with plans in place to reopen in the future. Another notable firm, Dan's Power Plant, produces nut-based cheese substitutes known as "Fauxmaggio," as a vegan alternative, selling many of their products in upscale markets in New York, Connecticut, and Massachusetts.

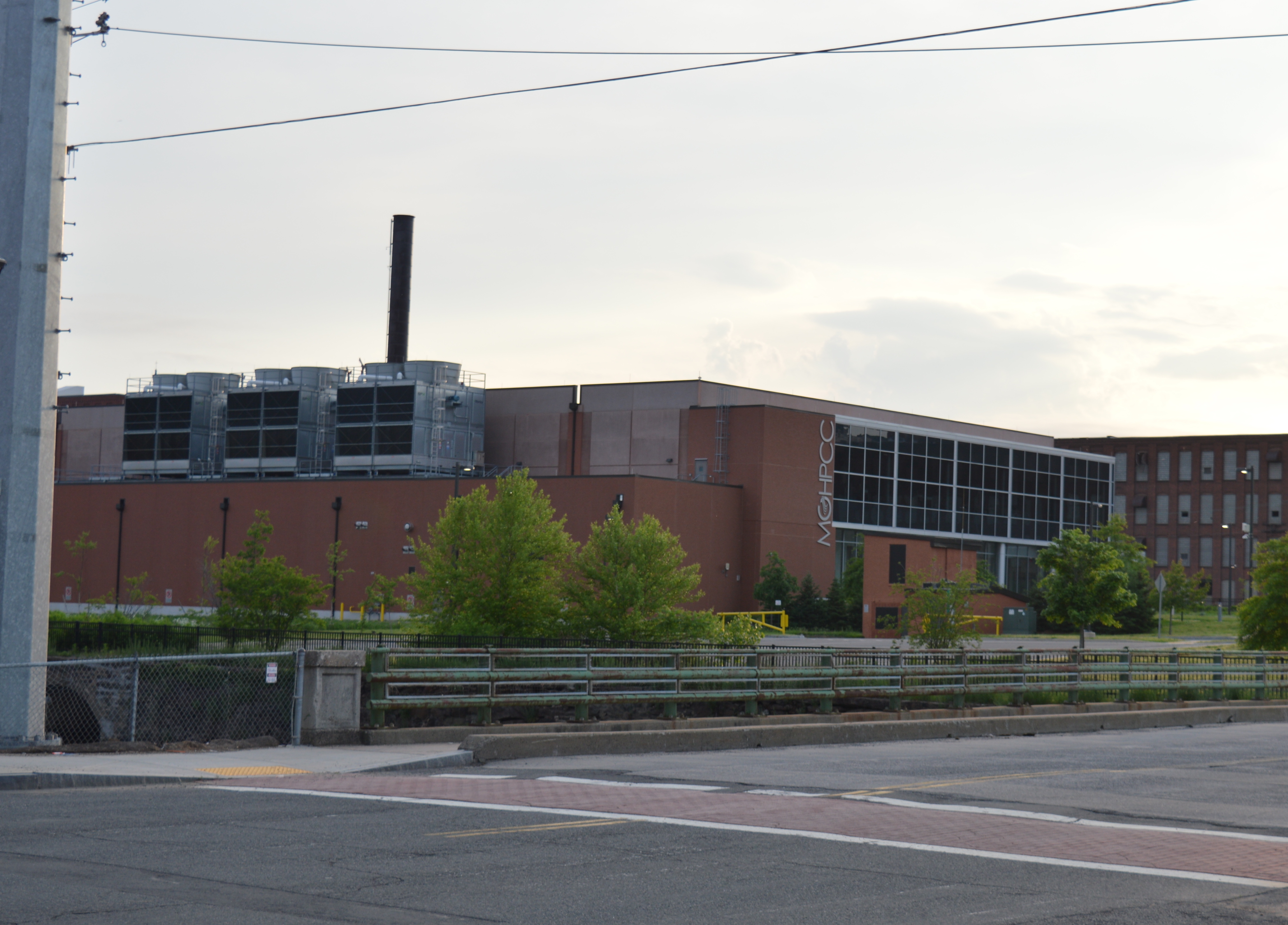
Main campus of the Massachusetts Green High Performance Computing Center, the newest building constructed to draw power from the Holyoke Canal System

=== Technology ===
In recent years there have been successful efforts to attract high-tech jobs to Holyoke and diversify its economic base. For example, a coalition of universities and tech companies have built the Massachusetts Green High Performance Computing Center, an energy-efficient, high-performance computing center in Holyoke that opened in 2012. Partners in the project include Cisco Systems, Harvard University, the Massachusetts Institute of Technology (MIT,) the University of Massachusetts, Boston University, Northeastern University, EMC Corporation, and Accenture PLC. The data center has been built in Holyoke partly because of hydropower accessibility and the city's extensive fiber network. In 2015, the editors of Popular Mechanics ranked Holyoke as 6th on a list of 14 cities considered to be best for startups in the United States and cited those factors. ISO New England, one of the United States' eight electricity regional transmission organizations, is based in Holyoke, utilizing the city's central location for easy access to metropolitan areas in New England and New York.

=== Services ===
The retail sector has been a major employer since the construction of the Holyoke Mall, the third largest shopping mall in New England, in 1979. Retail has provided the city with a large and steady tax base, contributing over $7 million in taxes annually.

The city also features the corporate headquarters of PeoplesBank, the largest bank in Western Massachusetts, as well as the local Holyoke Credit Union, which was originally started as a credit union for the students of a former parochial school.

=== Urban agriculture ===
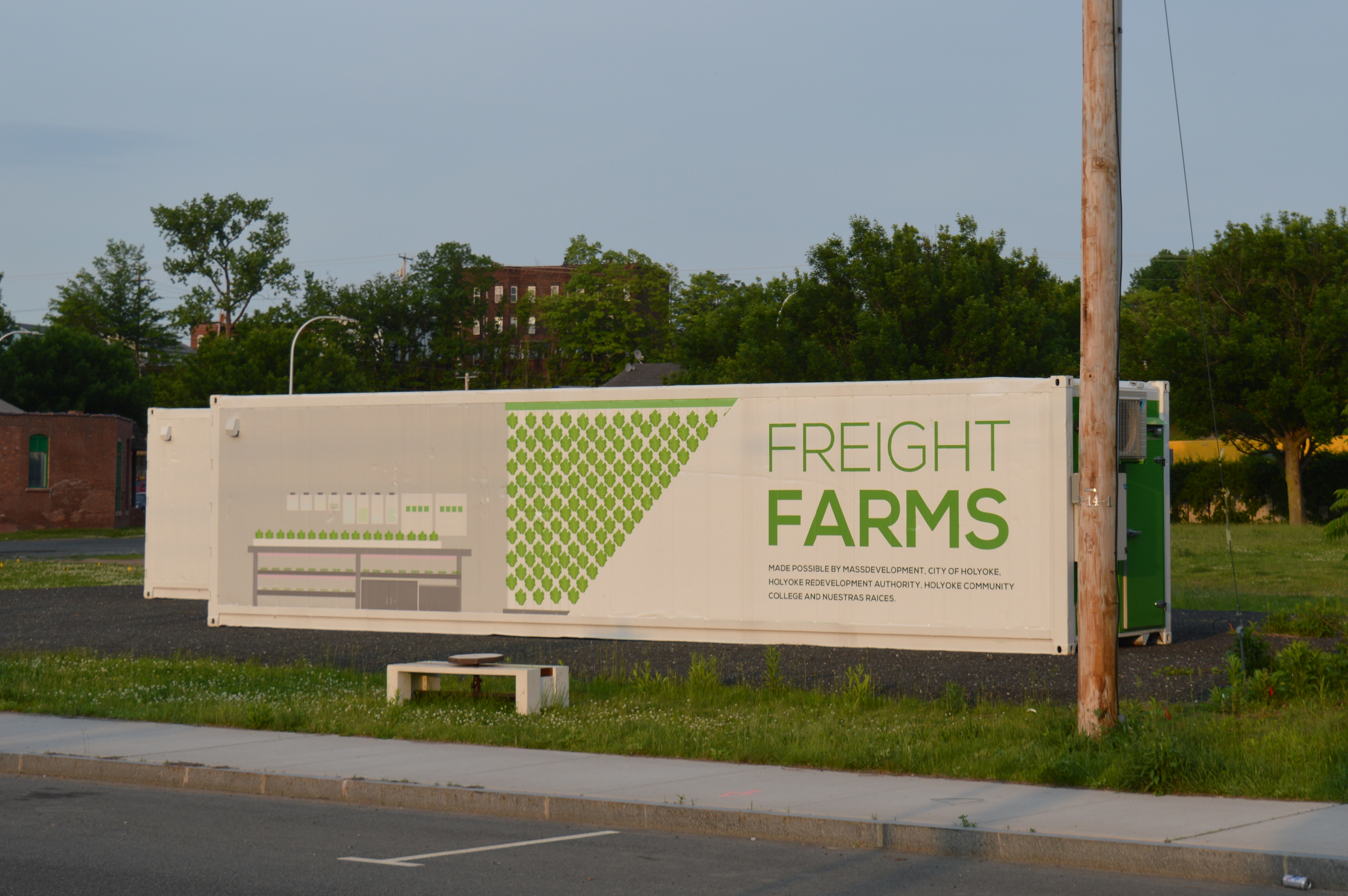
Converted shipping containers used for training in hydroponic agriculture, a collaborative project between Holyoke Community College, Nuestras Raices, and MassDevelopment

Despite a reputation as an industrial city, agriculture has played a continuing role in the Holyoke's livelihood throughout its history. On July 24, 1917, it became the first city in Western Massachusetts to open a modern farmers market, a novelty at the time, bringing producers directly to consumers. The current farmers market, which began in 1979, is regularly held outside city hall on Thursdays from 10 to 2 from May to October. As late as the 1950s, the city maintained a poor farm while, in contrast, during the late 19th century a number of wealthy manufacturers raised thoroughbred Jersey cattle. This trend began in 1881, when the city went from a population of zero to fifty head of registered Jerseys, the largest herd in the Connecticut Valley being that of William Whiting. This prize-winning herd, then 75 head, was lost, however, to an incendiary fire that destroyed Whiting Farm's stock barn in 1919. Conventional dairy and cattle farming remained extant through most of the 20th century, with the last conventional livestock farm closing in 1982.

Nevertheless smaller market agriculture operations, which began in the 20th century, endure today. Among Holyoke's most notable contemporary agricultural organizations is Nuestras Raices. Established in 1992 by members of the La Finquita community garden of South Holyoke, the nonprofit organization has worked with state and federal agencies to help new farmers build skills and expertise, particularly in the Puerto Rican community, through microloans, direct marketing, and land leasing.

Holyoke also has a prominent example of ecosystem garden permaculture—the Holyoke Edible Food Forest Garden, established in 2004 by Eric Toensmeier and Jonathan Bates. In the following decade, the two designed and developed their tenth of an acre backyard into a year-round food producing garden with over 100 perennial plant species, which sustain limited wildlife populations, and have remediated soil on the site. Their permaculture garden has been featured in The New York Times, as well as lectures at Harvard and Yale University. A detailed account of the design and management of this space and the principles behind it can be found in the book by the two, "Paradise Lot," released in 2013 by Chelsea Green Publishing.

Soon after medical marijuana was legalized in Massachusetts, Mayor Alex Morse began promoting the city as a growth and distribution center for the new industry because of its low energy costs and proximity to several metropolitan markets. Since the legalization of recreational weed in Massachusetts in 2016, the city has been approached by several cultivation businesses hoping to establish themselves in former mills. In 2018, the first cannabis cultivation operation, a $10 million investment, opened in the city, with plans to open a dispensary in the future.

== Education ==
The city's educational needs are served by Holyoke Public Schools, including Holyoke High School, and a number of private institutions. The school system is currently in receivership and managed by Dr. Stephen Zrike, a receiver appointed by the Massachusetts Department of Elementary and Secondary Education; as superintendent, the receiver presides over school curriculum and practices. The city's private schools include First Lutheran School and Mater Dolorosa Catholic School.

The city is also home to Holyoke Community College, the first community college in the state, which was initially created by the city's school board. Today, the two-year college selectively allows high school seniors to enroll in its coursework for transferable college credit, and has the highest percentage of student graduates completing associate degrees and certificate programs among the state's community colleges. With the aid of state and federal education grants the college opened the HCC MGM Culinary Arts Institute in cooperation with MGM Springfield in April 2018.

In 2016, Bard College established the first of its microcolleges in Holyoke, its other being in Brooklyn. Bard Microcollege Holyoke operates in partnership with local nonprofit The Care Center, which provides educational and career opportunities to pregnant and parenting teens. Associates of arts degrees are granted to a small class of young mothers who have completed The Care Center's own educational programs in addition to those by Bard.

=== Library ===
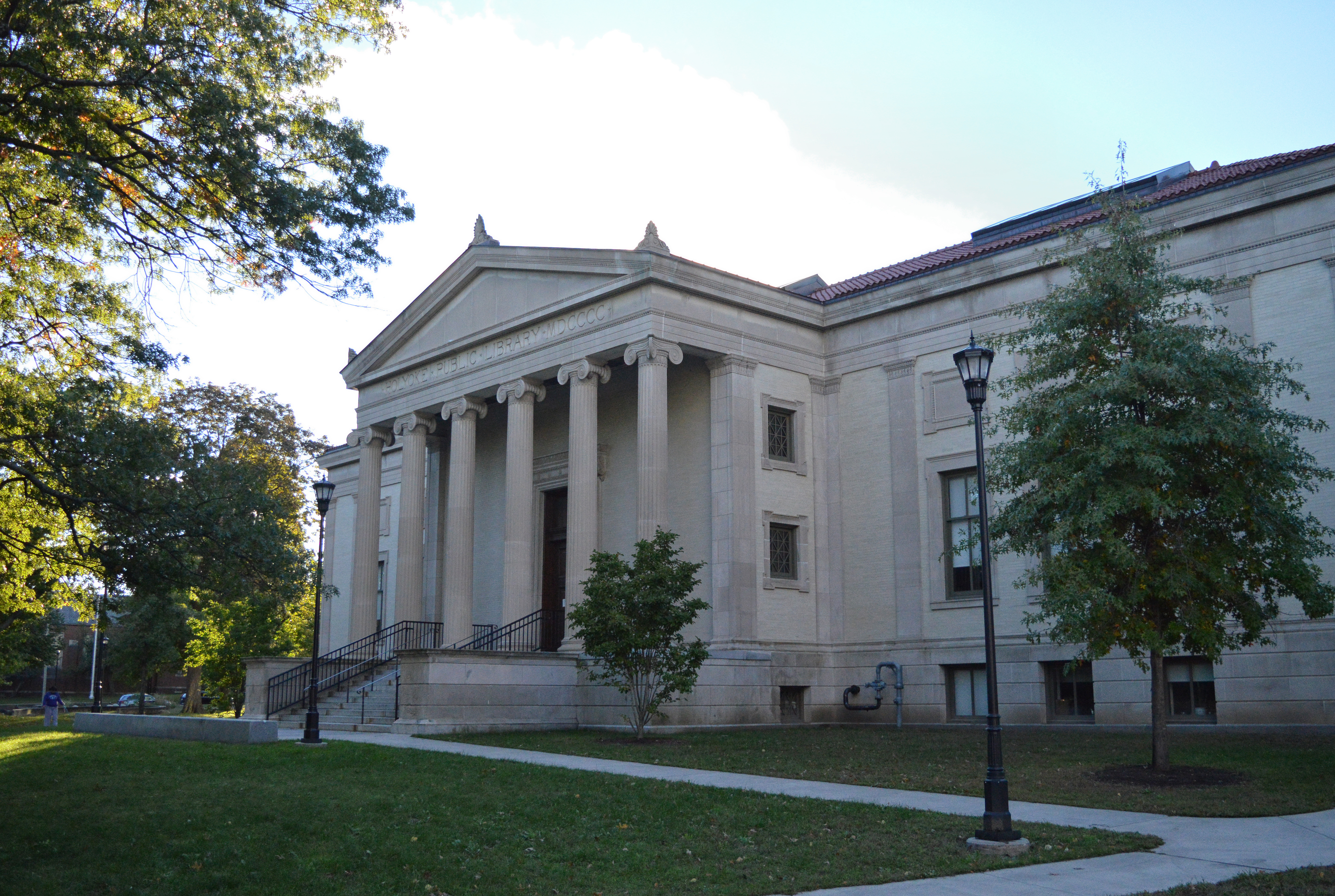
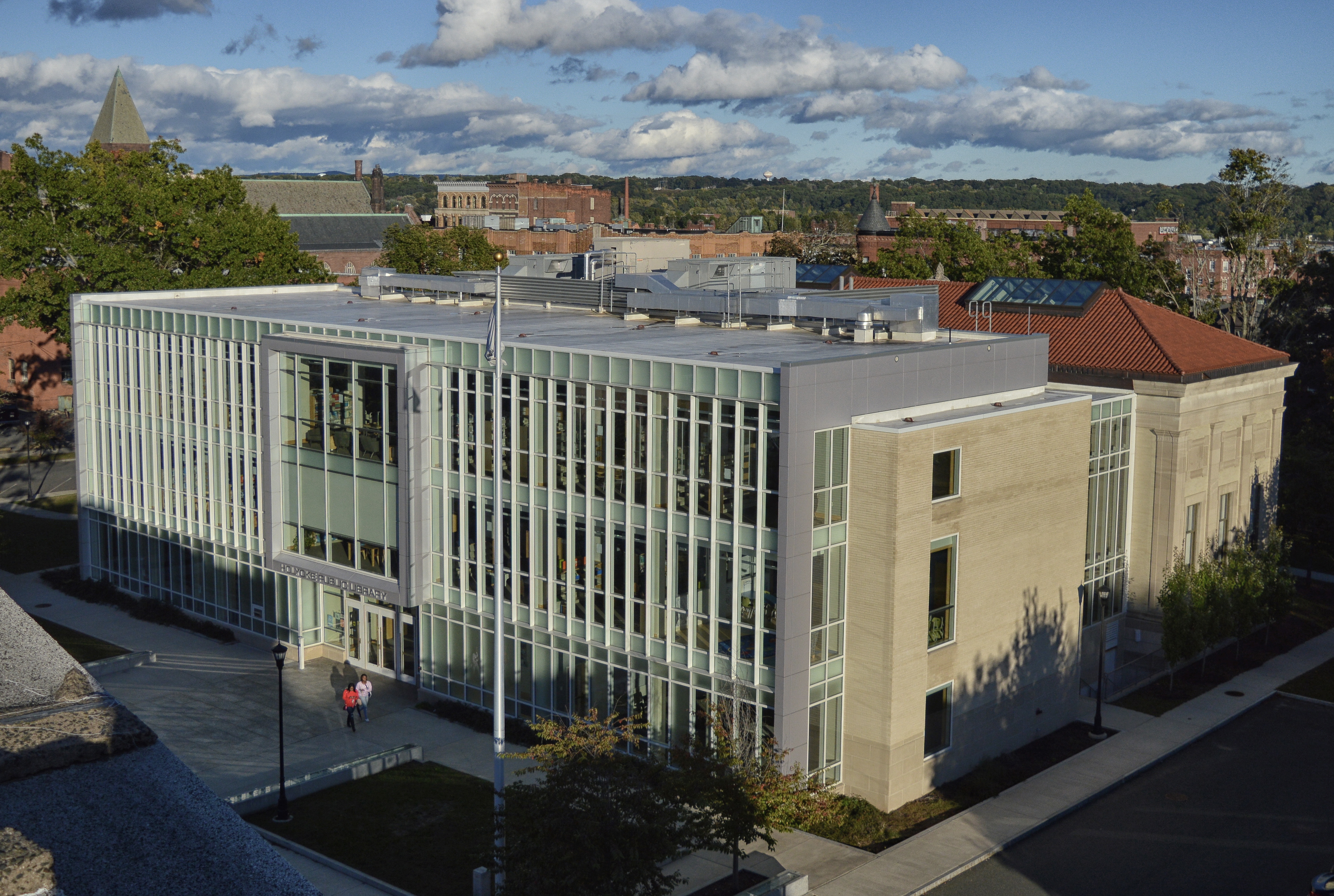
The front facade Holyoke Public Library completed in 1902, as seen from Maple Street, and the 2013 expansion

Holyoke Public Library, found at 335 Maple Street, is one of the very few examples of neoclassical architecture in the city of Holyoke, designed by prominent local architect James A. Clough. It sits on Library Park, which was donated by the Holyoke Water Power Company in 1887. The library established in 1870 was originally a room in the old Appleton Street School, and by 1876 moved to a central room on the main floor of City Hall. It remained there until its collections had outgrown this space and a modern facility was required.

Holyoke's citizens were charged to raise money to construct the library building and provide additional books. Under the leadership of Henry Chase, $95,000 was raised. William Whiting and William Skinner, each gave $10,000. Clough, the architect who designed the building, gave his services gratis because his daughter was a faithful patron of the library. It opened officially in 1902.

At the dedication ceremony, William Whiting, library president at the time, referred to the library as the "people's college" and added, "A library is as much a part of the intellectual life of a community as its schools, and should be supported generously as part of our educational system. Within these walls you will find authors devoted to literature, arts and science, and they are free to any who will ask. We can say to the citizens of Holyoke you have only to ask her and you will find knowledge to make your life useful and happy."

== Culture ==
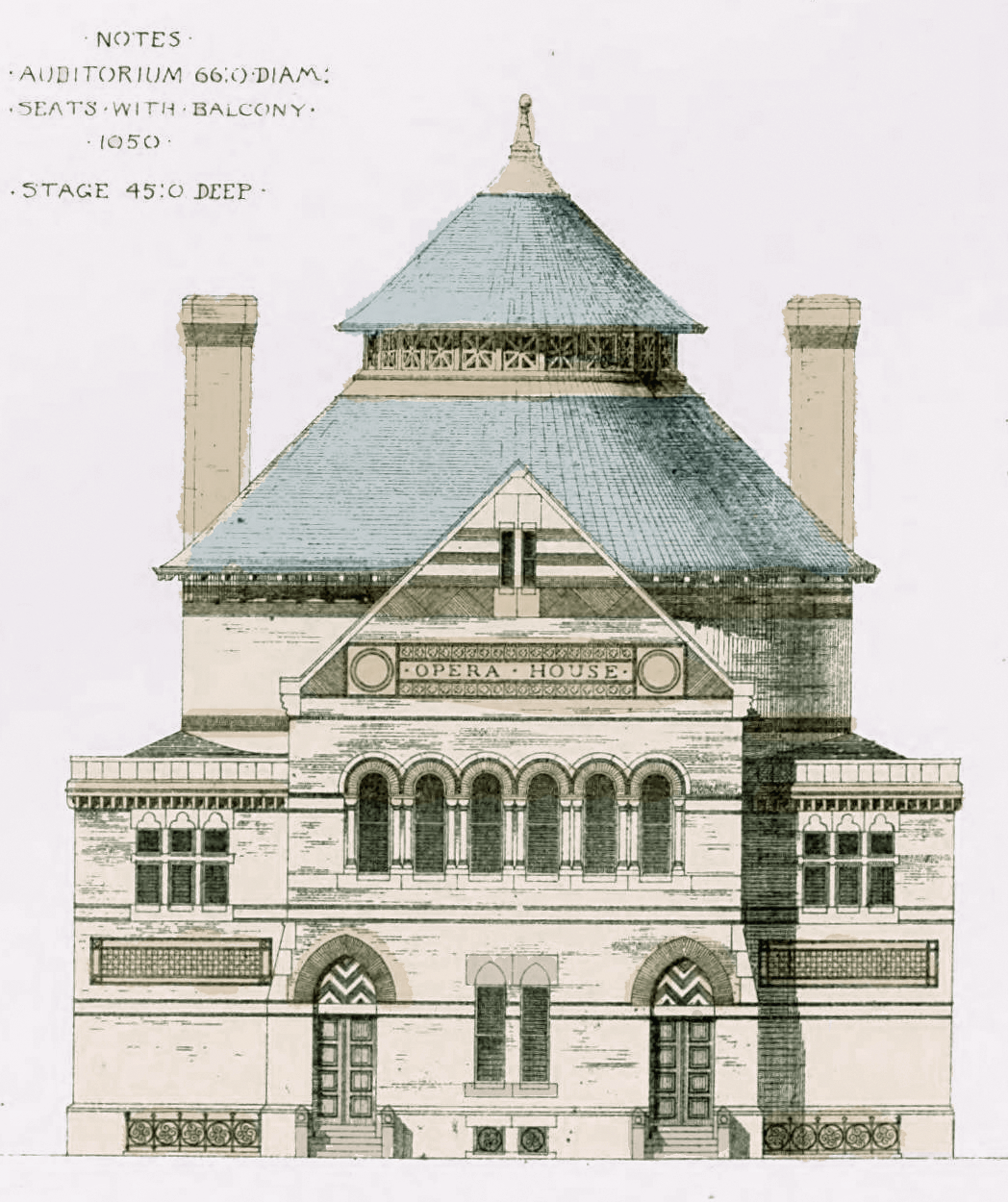
The Holyoke Opera House, built in 1878 by founder of Whiting Paper and then-Mayor William Whiting, it hosted numerous Vaudeville acts, as well as international music acts like the Royal Hungarian Court Orchestra, and the silent films of Lyman H. Howe. Later converted to a full-time movie theater, the structure burned down in 1967.

A number of artists have been associated with the city since its founding, including Irish-American sculptor Jerome Connor, who moved to the city at the age of 14, and became best known for his sculptures in Washington, D.C. including Nuns of the Battlefield, one of only two such memorials in the capital to honor the role of women in the American Civil War.

On May 2, 1885, Clark W. Bryan, a publisher and stakeholder in The Republican, launched Good Housekeeping magazine, originally described as "not to be a bi-monthly cookbook" but "a family journal conducted in the interests of the higher life of the household." The magazine was subsequently published in Springfield after March 1887 and moved to New York after its acquisition in 1911 by the Hearst Corporation. In literature, Holyoke was the hometown of John Clellon Holmes, whose novel Go is considered to be the first published novel depicting the Beat Generation, predating works of his contemporaries Jack Kerouac and Allen Ginsberg. Though not as well known as Holmes, the critically acclaimed novelist Raymond Kennedy set a number of his works in a fictional Holyoke, referred to as "Ireland Parish." Several acclaimed photographers originate from Holyoke, including Ray D'Addario, chief photographer of the Nuremberg trials, William Wegman, known nationally for his compositions of costumed weimaraners, and Mitch Epstein, whose photo essay Family Business received the United Kingdom's Kraszna-Krausz Photography Book Award in 2004. The 2003 book covered the final days of his father's furniture and real estate businesses in the city, mirroring its deindustrialization and decline. Similarly, the city's struggles with race, inequity, and deindustrialization were chronicled in Pulitzer Prize winner Tracy Kidder's 1989 book, Among Schoolchildren, after Kidder spent a year following a fifth-grade class at Marcella Kelly Elementary.

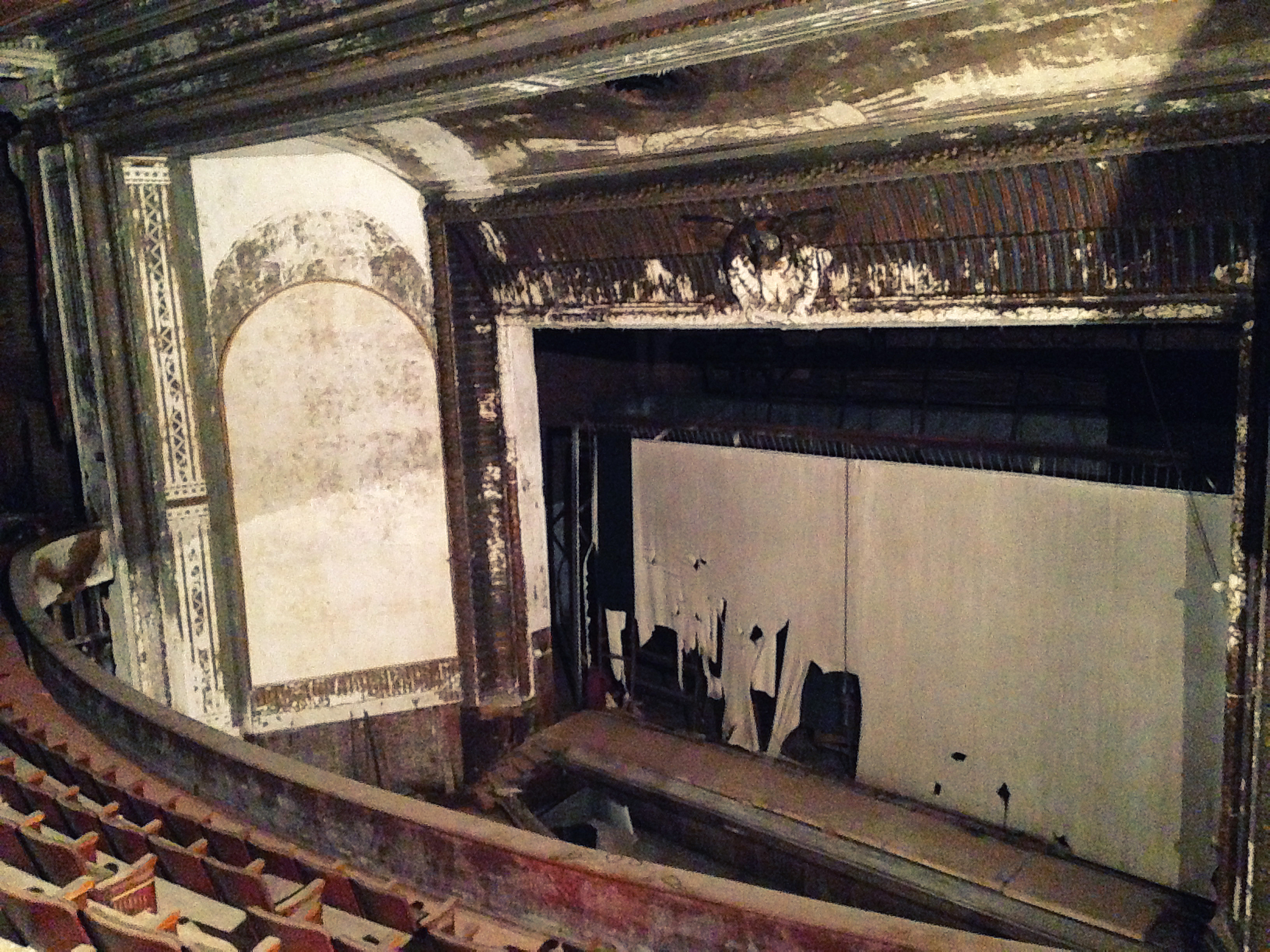
The stage of the Victory Theater, closed since 1979. An ongoing attempt to revive the theater is being overseen by the Massachusetts International Festival of the Arts (MIFA).

During the height of its industrial prowess, Holyoke was a regular stop on vaudeville circuits, with its most famous actress, Eva Tanguay, known as "The Girl Who Made Vaudeville Famous." Tanguay moved to Holyoke at a young age, spending her childhood in the city where she began performing songs at an amateur show at the local Parsons Hall in the 1880s. Tanguay was soon discovered by a Pennsylvania touring company and went on to become the first American popular musician to achieve mass-media celebrity. During her career, her name was known from coast-to-coast, and she would earn more than such celebrities as Enrico Caruso and Harry Houdini. Edward Bernays, the "father of public relations" went on to describe her celebrity as "our first symbol of emergence from the Victorian age." Tanguay's was just one of many acts associated with the city's history, it was in Holyoke that vaudevillian Sophie Tucker was found by the Theatrical Syndicate's Marc Klaw who introduced her to Broadway's Ziegfeld Follies in 1909.

Even as Vaudeville declined in the 1920s, the city remained a regular stop for actors and musicians alike. Among other acts, Bing Crosby and The Marx Brothers were known to have played shows in the city at its Victory Theater. Performers from the B. F. Keith Circuit would regularly tour Mountain Park's own playhouse, which also hosted the Valley Players with whom the actor Hal Holbrook most famously launched his career. Perhaps the most prominent venue after the 1920s, the Valley Arena Gardens hosted a wide variety of musical acts including the likes of Count Basie, Duke Ellington, The Dorsey Brothers, The Glenn Miller Orchestra, Frances Langford, Cab Calloway, and Sarah Vaughn among many others still known in American popular culture today. Holyoke City Hall during this period also regularly served as a venue for notable music acts as well, including several by the New York Philharmonic Orchestra annually from 1912–1925 under the direction Josef Stránský and subsequently Willem Mengelberg, and at least one performance by the Boston Symphony Orchestra in 1926. Those concerts were organized by the Chamber of Commerce, Holyoke Music Club, and Mount Holyoke College, which also brought a number of internationally renowned artists to Holyoke High School as well, including violinist Efrem Zimbalist, baritone Reinald Werrenrath, Berlin State Opera contralto Margarethe Arndt-Ober, and pianist-composers Ethel Leginska and Percy Grainger.

Of venues that once defined Holyoke's stage history, few remain; for the last decade an effort has been underway to restore the Victory Theater by the Massachusetts International Festival of the Arts. The efforts have included the introduction of the Victory Players in 2018, an international music residency program that plays contemporary classical music to support the funding of future theater programming. Today, Holyoke's venues include Gateway City Arts, a converted paper factory now serving as a regular music venue, as well as the site of the former Mountain Park, now used for some large outdoor concerts, and the Holyoke Turner Hall, which features smaller shows. The city has its own symphony as well; the Holyoke Civic Symphony, originally a project of the Holyoke Community College, has been playing popular and classical works since 1967, and is based out of the college's Leslie Phillips Theater.

=== Museums ===
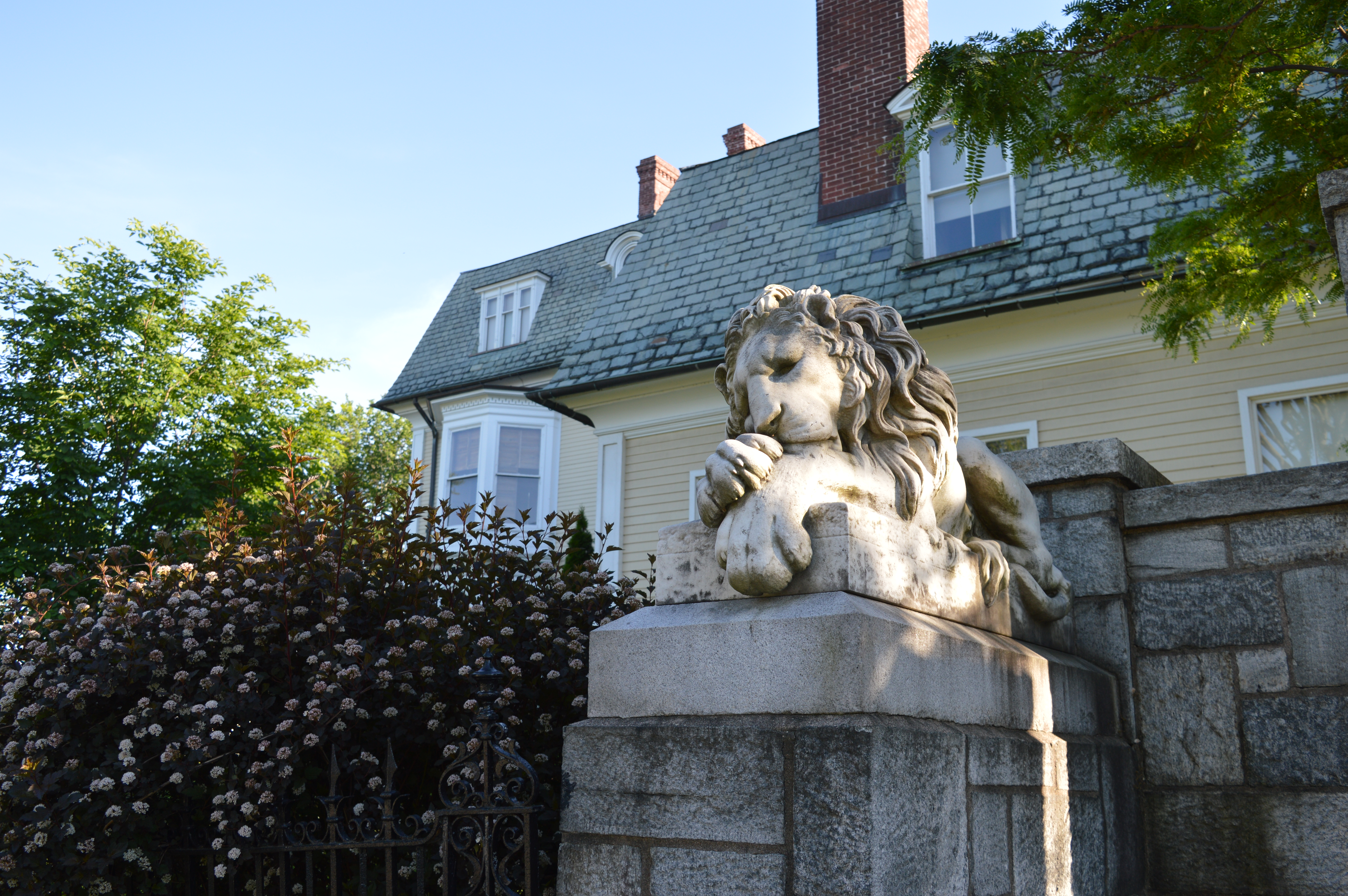
The Sleeping Lion at the gates of Wistariahurst Museum

In addition to the Volleyball Hall of Fame the city is also home to Wistariahurst. Named for the flowered vines that adorn its gardens, the estate was home to the Skinner Family, which produced sewing silk and satins and became the largest producer of the latter in the world. The museum is home to a wide variety of contemporary and historic gallery events and contains numerous archival collections for research. Though no longer in the museum collections, Wistariahurst was once home to the eminent Belle Skinner Collection of Musical Instruments, curated by its namesake Belle Skinner. Several decades after her death, the collection became a substantial part of the Yale University Collection of Musical Instruments. (Note: A complete catalog of this collection may be found in Skinner, William; Thompson, Elizabeth (1933). The Belle Skinner Collection of Old Musical Instruments, Holyoke, Massachusetts. Philadelphia: Beck Engraving Company. OCLC 64299108.)

The Children's Museum at Holyoke, started by the Junior League of Holyoke in 1984, features a number of hands-on exhibits, including a water table, Lite-Brite wall, and a variety of displays including 2,000 collector Pez dispensers.

=== Annual events ===
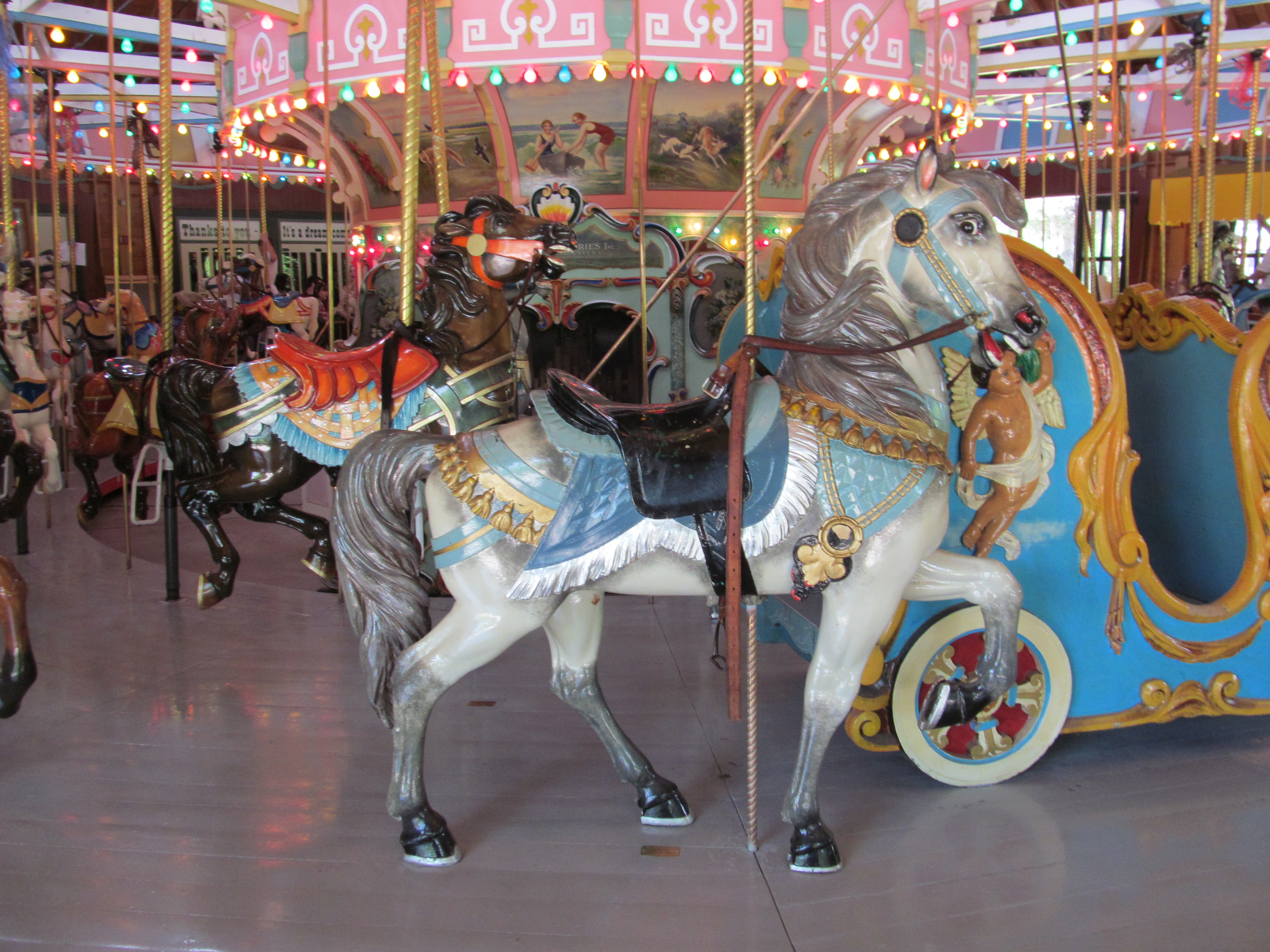
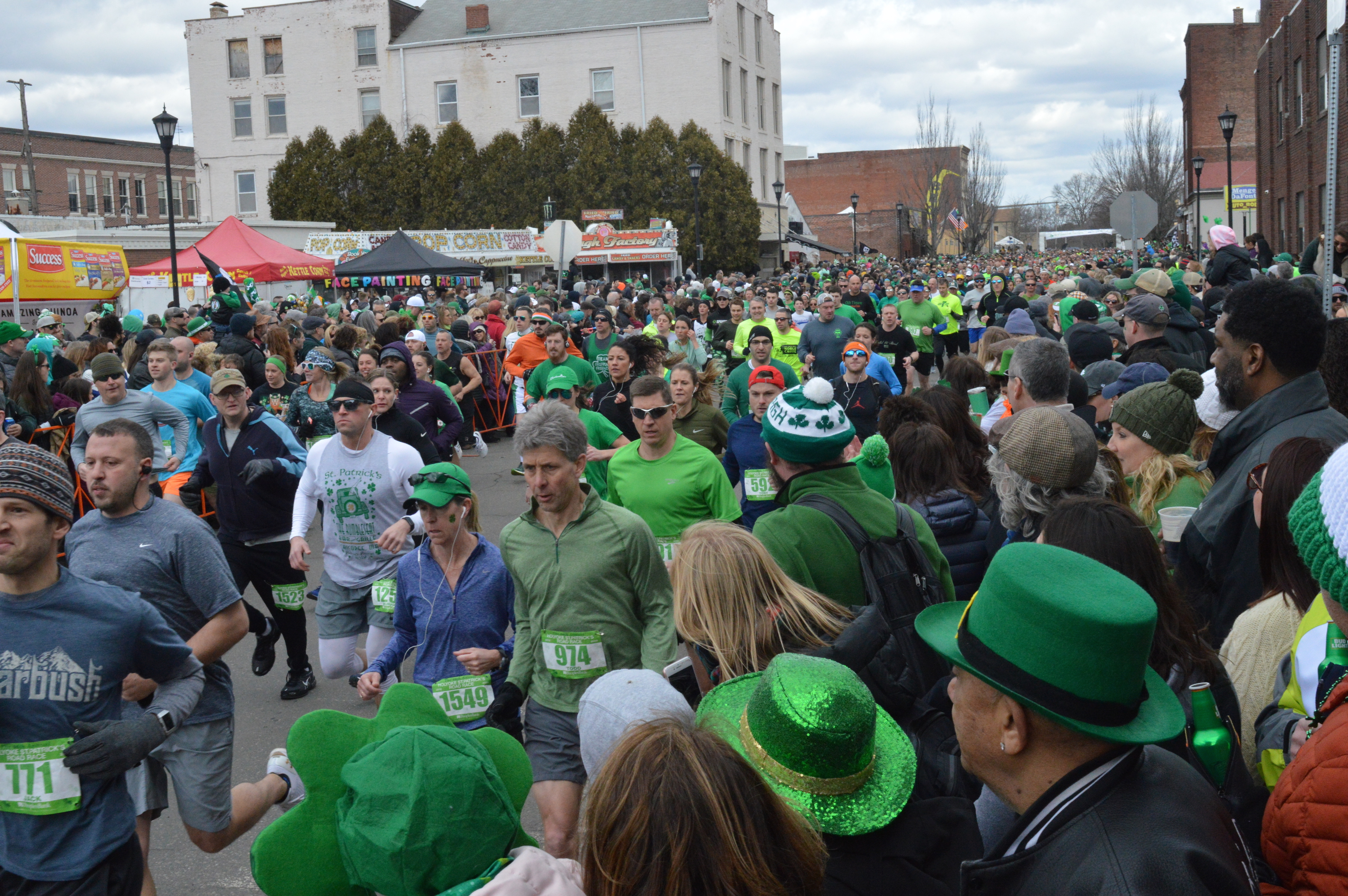
The Holyoke Merry-Go-Round, moved to Heritage Park from Mountain Park in 1993, is featured in the annual First Night Jr. and Celebrate Holyoke festivities. Runners leave the starting line in the annual St. Patrick's Day Road Race 10K.

Holyoke is home to the second-largest St. Patrick's Day parade in the United States, surpassed only by the New York City parade. Held annually since 1952 on the Sunday following St. Patrick's Day, the parade draws hundreds of thousands of people from across New England and the Eastern seaboard of United States. In recent years the Holyoke Saint Patrick's Day Parade typically attracts 350,000 to 450,000 people each year. Featured in the parade every year since the first in 1952 is the Holyoke Caledonian Pipe Band, founded in 1910, it is the oldest pipe band continuously operating in the United States.

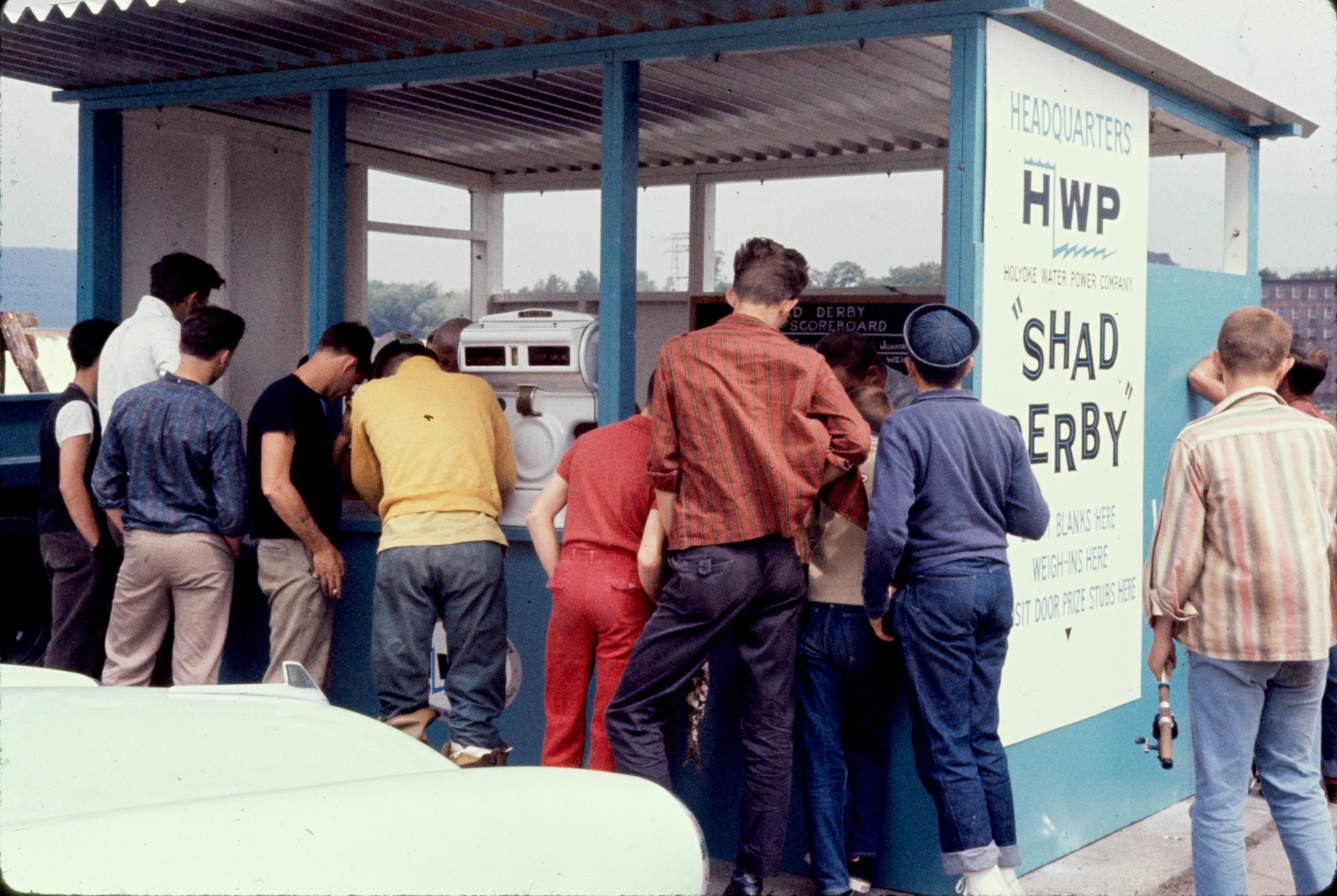
Participants crowd the weighing station for the annual Holyoke Shad Derby, c. 1965.

Since 1962, the city has held an annual Shad Derby every year in May with rare exception. The contest, begun under the Holyoke Water Power Company, is now run by the municipal energy department Holyoke Gas & Electric. Though not weighed in time to enter Derby records, the section of the Connecticut south of the Holyoke Dam at Hadley Falls holds the world record for the largest American shad caught, which weighed 11 pounds, 4 ounces when it was hooked in 1986. Thanks to conservation measures, the river is known for a thriving American shad population, which has fluctuated between 226,000 and 778,000 fish since 2000.

Every June since it was first introduced by MayorAlex Morse, an LGBT activist, in 2012, the city has held a rainbow flag-raising ceremony in recognition of Gay Pride Month with the event often featuring speakers, music, and a moment of silence for victims of discrimination and persecution.

The Puerto Rican community of Holyoke holds an annual Puerto Rican Day parade on the third weekend of July as part of an Annual Hispanic Family Festival held by La Familia Hispana, inc. Every year the parade grows in popularity, attracting Puerto Ricans from across the northeast.

In the last week of August, the city hosts "Celebrate Holyoke" at Holyoke Heritage State Park. Launched in 1986 to celebrate the opening of the then-new state park, it features live music, food, and open house events for businesses in the downtown and canal district. In its first year alone the event featured a laser show, and had as many as 60 thousand attendants over the course of four days; financial difficulties, however, led to its cancellation in 1995. The event was revived in 2015, and has continued as a two-day event since.

Since 2016, every September the neighborhood association of South Holyoke has hosted El Sabor de South Holyoke (Taste of South Holyoke) a festival featuring local Puerto Rican cuisine, live music, and other events, including honoring local organizations for their contributions to the community.

Every November, the International Volleyball Hall of Fame presents awards to its next class of inductees, as the best players of that year are named. The Hall presents three additional awards annually: the Court of Honor Award for contributions of teams or organizations to volleyball, the William G. Morgan Award for outstanding support or promotion of the sport, and Mintonette Medallion of Merit Award in recognition of significant individual achievement, including coaches, referees, scorekeepers and other notable contributors to the sport.

=== Points of interest ===
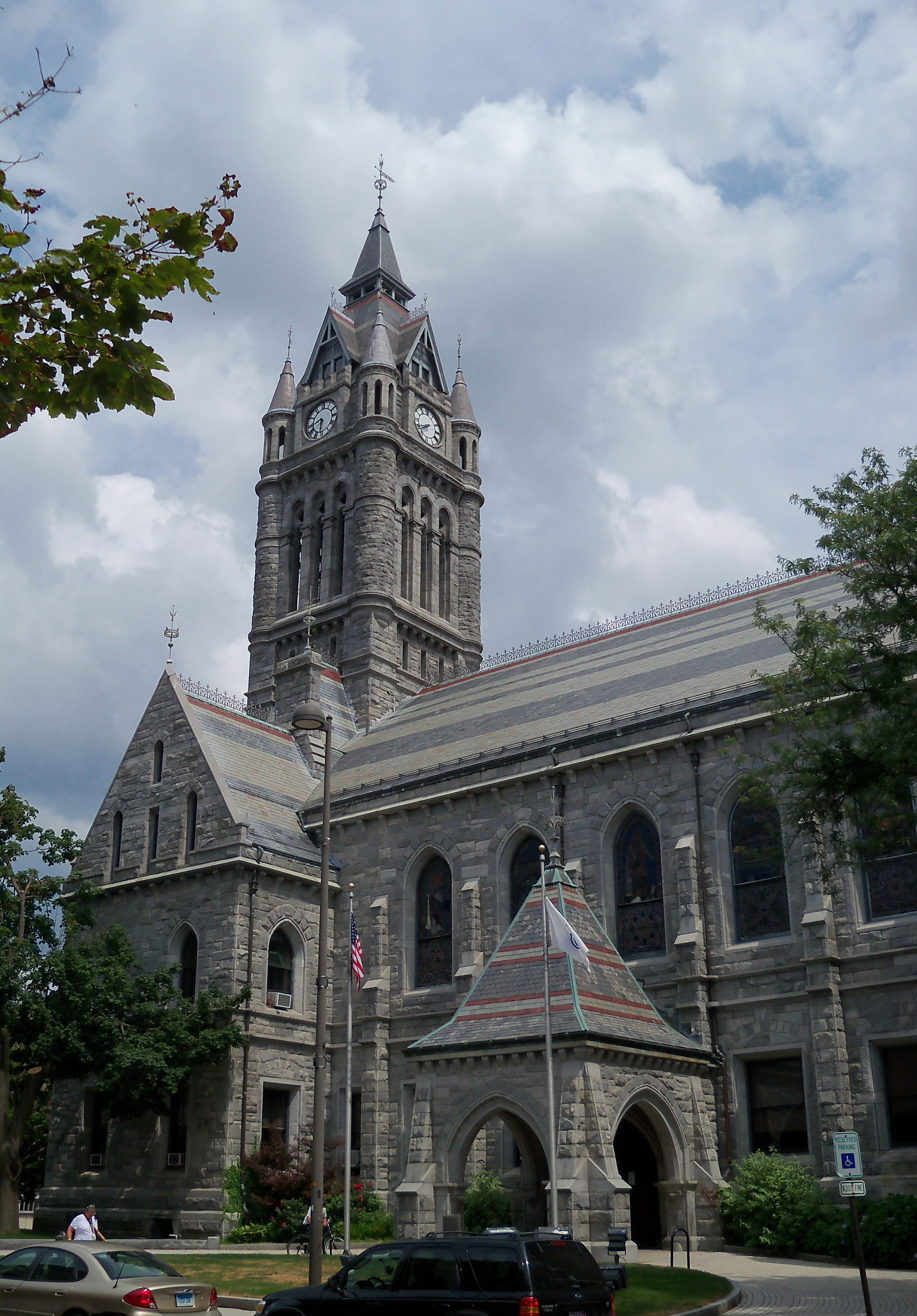
Holyoke City Hall

- Dinosaur Footprints Reservation, preserved dinosaur footprints along the Connecticut River
- East Mountain
- Gateway City Arts, a co-working space for artists and creatives
- Holyoke Canal System
- Holyoke Heritage State Park
- Holyoke Mall at Ingleside
- Holyoke Merry-Go-Round
- Mackenzie Stadium, home of the Valley Blue Sox of the New England Collegiate Baseball League
- Metacomet-Monadnock Trail
- Mount Tom of the Mount Tom Range
- Robert E. Barrett Fishway, lift system to allow fish to swim upstream of the Holyoke Dam
- Scott Tower
- Holyoke U.S. Post Office, Captain Alezue Holyoke's Exploring Party on the Connecticut River, an oil on canvas mural, painted by Ross Moffett and installed in 1936.
- Victory Theater
- Wistariahurst Museum

== Sports ==
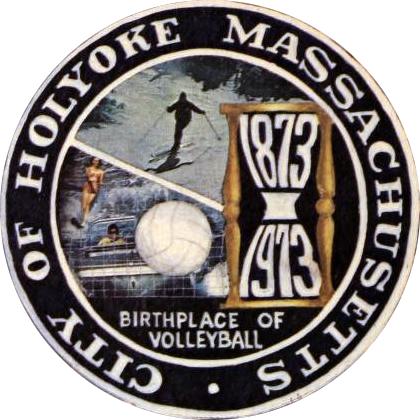
The obverse side of the city's centennial seal, prominently featuring volleyball, as well as water-skiing on the Connecticut River, and the former Mount Tom Ski Area, all sports associated with the city's history and culture

=== Birthplace of volleyball ===
On February 9, 1895, William G. Morgan invented volleyball, originally known as "mintonette" for its similarity to badminton, at the Holyoke YMCA. Though the original YMCA building in which the sport was first played was lost to fire in 1943, the Greater Holyoke YMCA remains an active chapter. Today the Volleyball Hall of Fame resides at Holyoke Heritage State Park and inducts a new class of athletes, coaches, and contributors every October. The city's legacy in the creation of the sport is also honored by two volleyball clubs in the Netherlands, which borrow its name: Belfeldse Volleybalclub Holyoke, of Belfeld, and Volleybalvereniging Holyoke of Enter.

=== Baseball ===
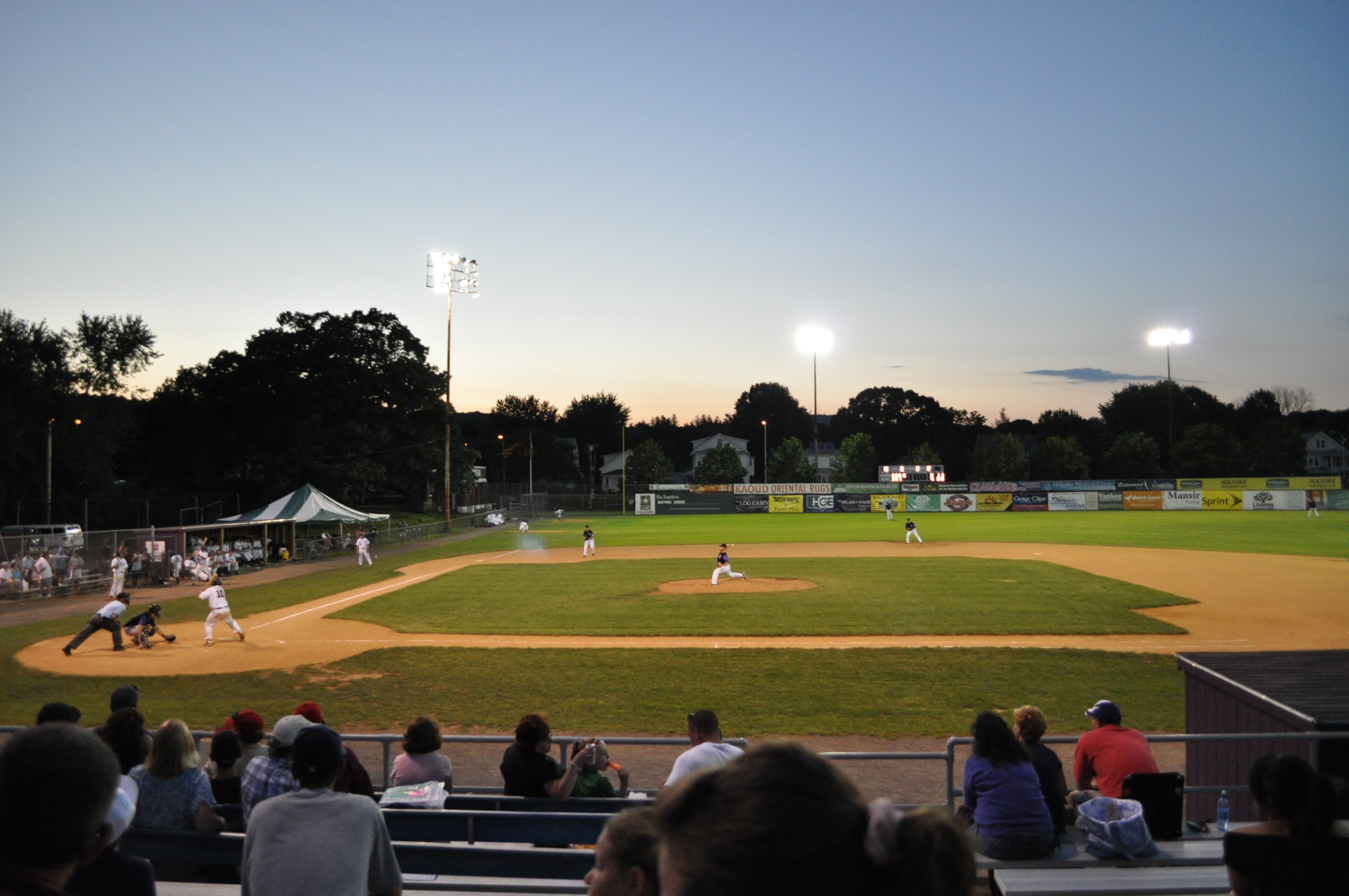
Mackenzie Stadium during a Blue Sox game, seen from the grandstand

The Valley Blue Sox, a member of the New England Collegiate Baseball League, play their home games at Mackenzie Stadium. Previously the Concord Quarry Dogs from 2001 until 2006, the collegiate summer baseball franchise moved to Holyoke in 2007, winning their first NECBL Championship in 2017.

Holyoke has been home to a handful of minor league and collegiate baseball teams, among the first was the Holyoke Paperweights of the Connecticut League from 1903 to 1911. The Holyoke Millers, a Double-A team, moved to the city following a single season in Pittsfield as the Berkshire Brewers. Early planning proved difficult for the team, as it often had to coordinate with the athletic departments of Holyoke High School and Holyoke Catholic High School for use of the field at the time. The Millers would leave for New Hampshire after their 1982 season, when the franchise changed its affiliation from the Milwaukee Brewers to the California Angels; that franchise is now the Harrisburg Senators.

While unsuccessful attempts were made to attract a new team in the years that followed, Holyoke would not host another until 2004. Following their departure from Middletown, Connecticut, the Holyoke Giants, an NECBL team, made Mackenzie Stadium their home until 2007, subsequently becoming the North Shore Navigators of Lynn.

=== Boxing ===
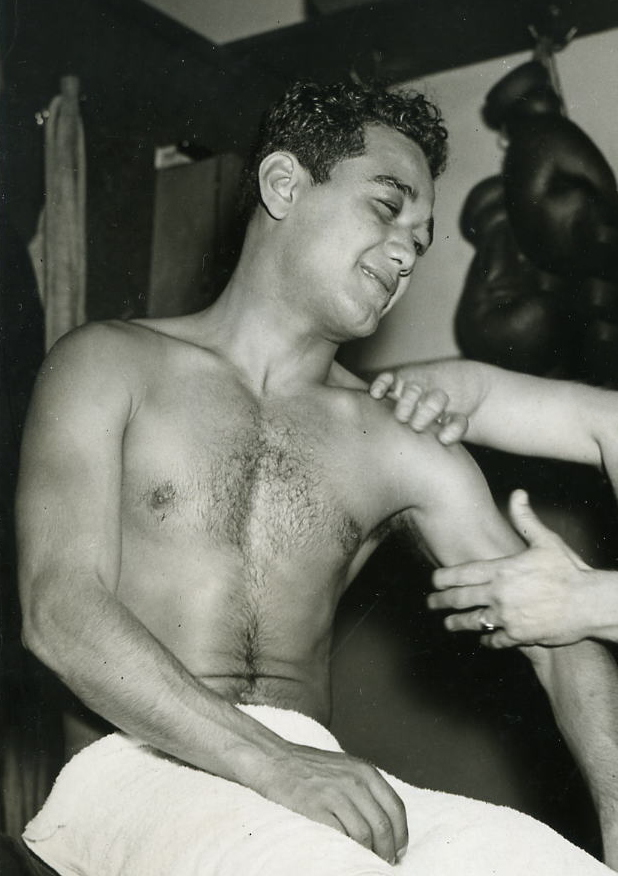
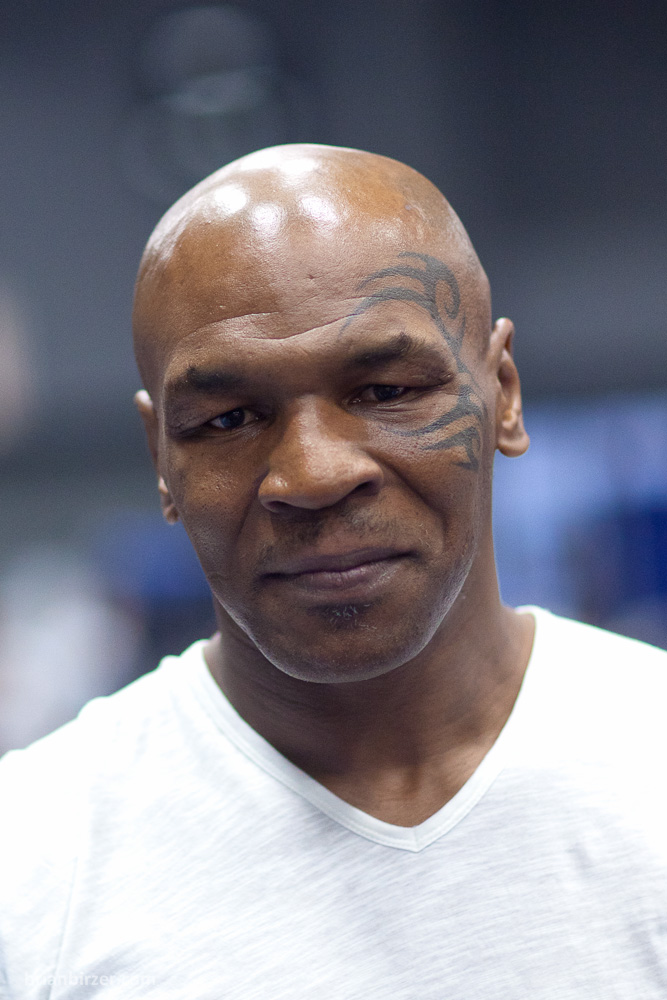
Left to right: Sixto Escobar, whose mainland debut was at Holyoke's Valley Arena, May 7, 1934. Mike Tyson's amateur career included the city's 1983 Golden Gloves title.

Holyoke has a rich history in the world of boxing. It was in Holyoke that bantamweight Sixto Escobar, the first Puerto Rican to become a world champion, fought and won his first match in the United States, on May 7, 1934, against bantamweight contender and Canadian flyweight champion Bobby Leitham. Most notably, Rocky Marciano's professional debut took place at the Valley Arena Gardens on St. Patrick's Day, March 17, 1947; the venue also served as the ring for many other well-known fighters including Beau Jack, Fritzie Zivic, and Tony DeMarco. Prior to his professional career, one of Mike Tyson's earliest fights was at the Holyoke Boys and Girls Club on February 12, 1983. As the eighth ranked amateur super-heavyweight in the country at the age of 16, Tyson won the fight handily with a knock-out, and gained the Western Massachusetts Golden Gloves title. The Golden Gloves tournament was held in Holyoke from 1958 until 2005, when it was relocated to Vernon, Connecticut. Following an eight-year departure, it returned briefly to the city, and is held in Springfield today. Though other materials would be used following their bankruptcy, in the early 20th century Skinner's Silk manufactured the satins for Everlast's iconic boxing trunks.

=== Golf ===
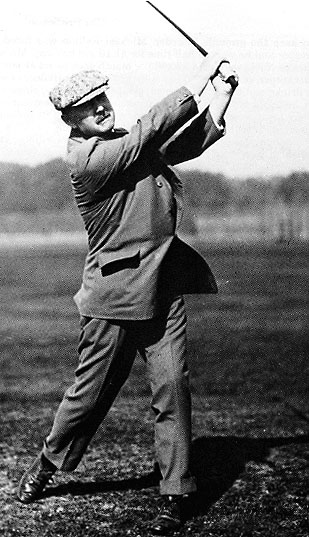
Donald Ross, famed golf course architect who lived in Holyoke for several years, initially with financial backing of local businessman J. L. Wyckoff

Holyoke has two private golf courses in Smith's Ferry, on opposite sides of Mount Tom, the nine-hole Holyoke Country Club and the 18-hole Wyckoff Country Club, the latter of which was originally designed by noted golf course architect Donald Ross. With the construction of Interstate 91 in the 1960s, the course required a redesign. From 1966 to 1967 much of the landscape was reshaped by golf architect Al Zikorus; today, five holes and seven greens remain of Ross's original designs.

The Wyckoff course opened in 1899 as the Mount Tom Golf Club and was described as rocky and unrefined in its early years. In 1910, Joseph L. Wyckoff, partner of stationery maker White & Wyckoff and the club's eventual namesake, was playing a round with then-president of the Boston Athletic Association Edward E. Babb. Wyckoff remarked the course at the time was "an apology for a [golf] course" and that he wished to find a man who "really knew about the laying out a golf course." Babb, a member of Oakley Country Club, said that he knew such a person and introduced Wyckoff to Ross later that year. Wyckoff brought Ross back to the course, where he suggested key changes, but was unable to prepare plans as he had just signed a two-year contract as professional for the Essex Golf & Country Club. Upon completion of the contract, he returned to Holyoke in 1914, where he was put up in a house built for him by Wyckoff, who was a member of the executive committee of the Massachusetts Golf Association and saw himself as a patron of Ross, offering him financial backing to pursue a broader career in golf course architecture. It is unknown how long Ross lived in the city, as he had summer homes and travelled often though a Boston Herald article placed him there in 1919. He would work with the club for many years abd complete a full redesign of the course by 1922, which remained unchanged until the construction of Interstate 91 in 1965.

== Parks and recreation ==
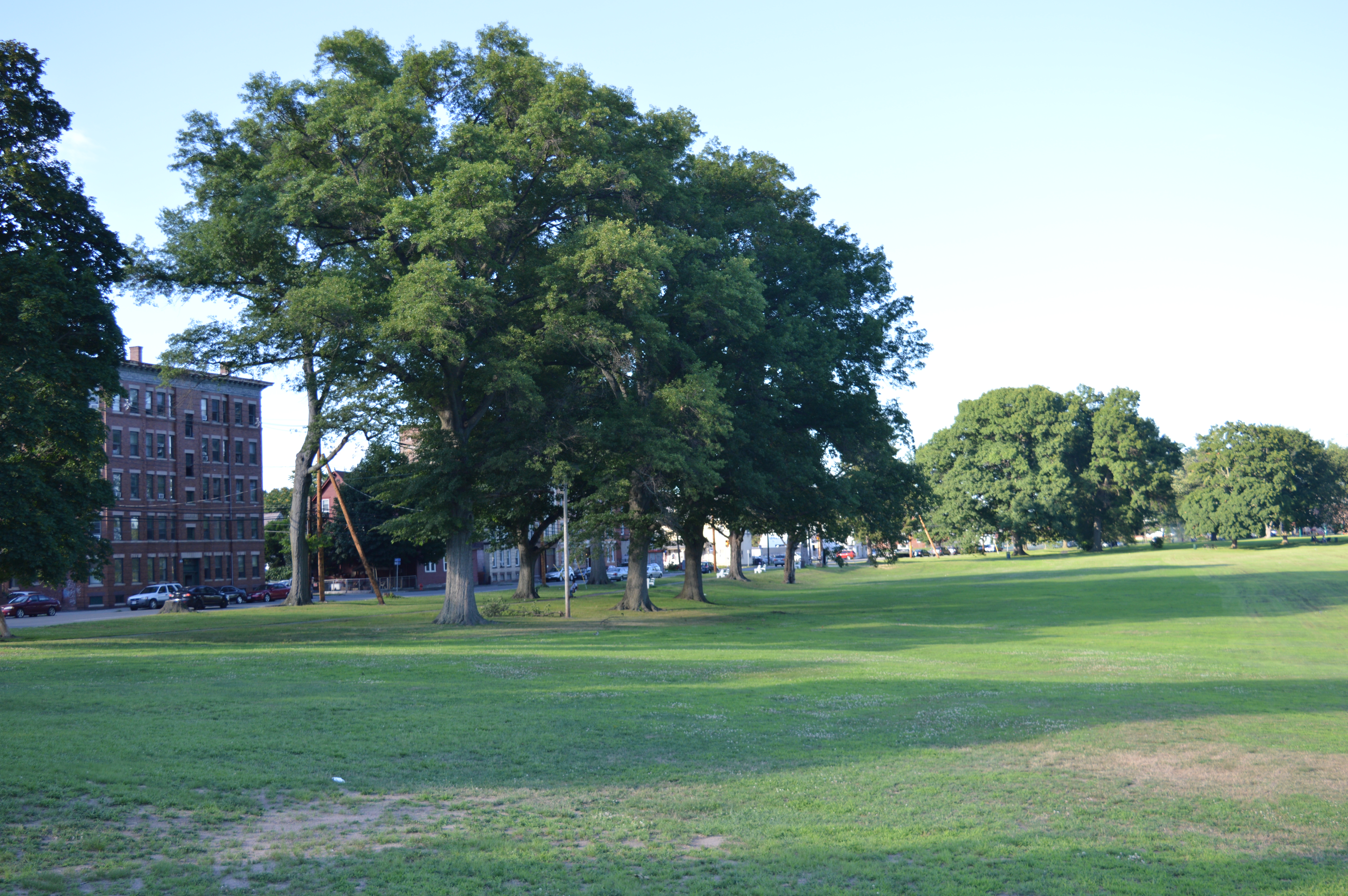

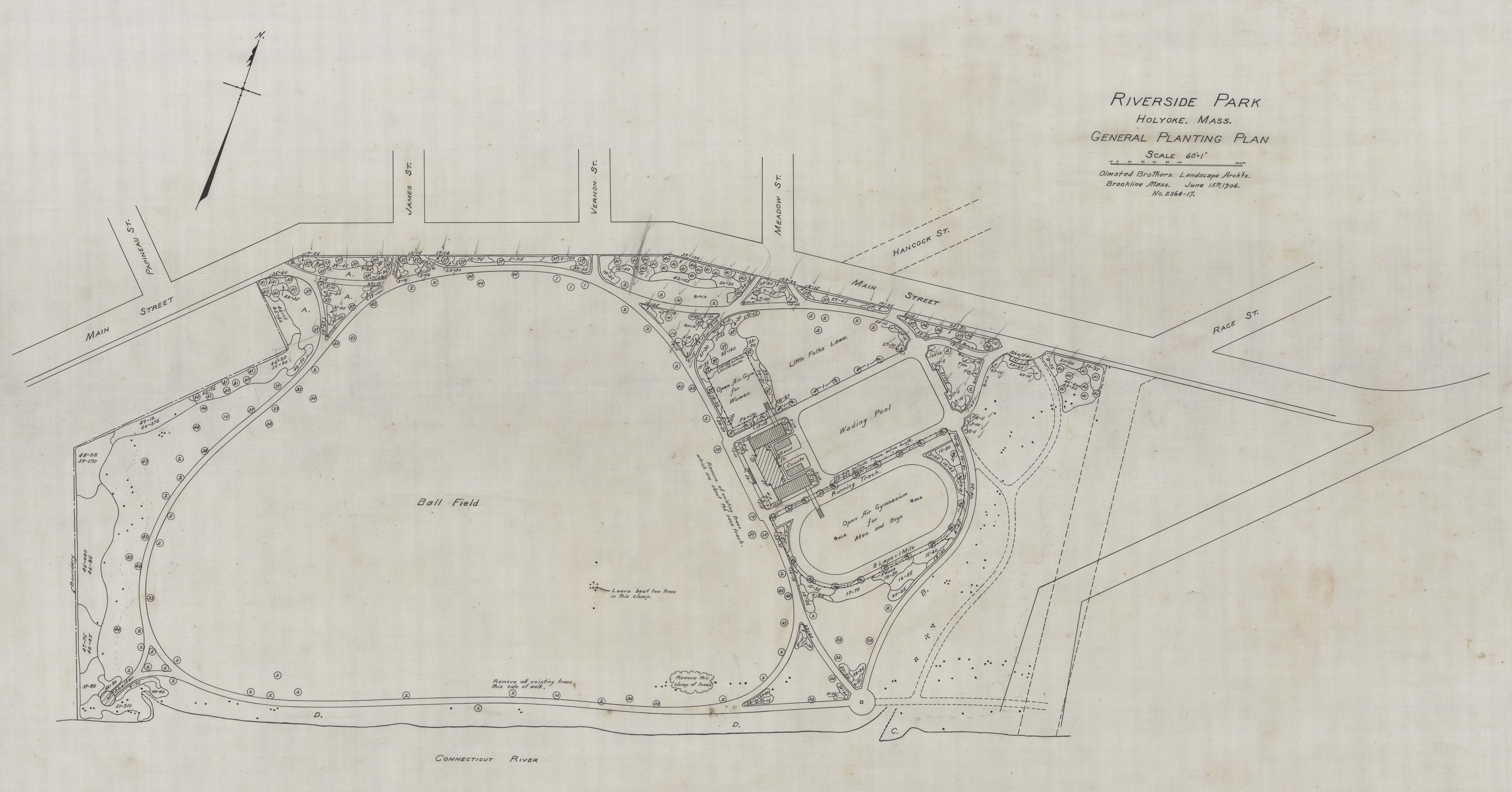
Top to bottom: Springdale Park and its original vegetation plan by the Olmsted Brothers

Holyoke is home to a wide array of municipal, state, and private land trust parks, including several designed by the Olmsted Brothers. The largest of them is Springdale Park, designed by the brothers in 1905–1906, and today the site of the annual Western Massachusetts Puerto Rican Parade and Festival. The park is one of three of the city's flagship parks, the other two being Pulaski Park, also an Olmsted design, and the Roberts Sports Complex, former site of Elmwood Park, which abuts Mackenzie Stadium. In total the city department of parks and recreation maintains 47 listed municipal facilities comprising nearly 250 acres, and including several baseball diamonds, playgrounds, a skatepark, basketball courts, tennis courts, a municipal pool, and a dog park. The Holyoke Water Works also maintains land holdings for the preservation of its watershed, some of which are open to the public, including Ashley Reservoir and Whiting Street Reservoir, which allow hiking but bar certain activities such as fishing, dog walking, and swimming. The same area, which transects the Metacomet Ridge, also contains a portion of the New England National Scenic Trail, managed by the National Park Service.

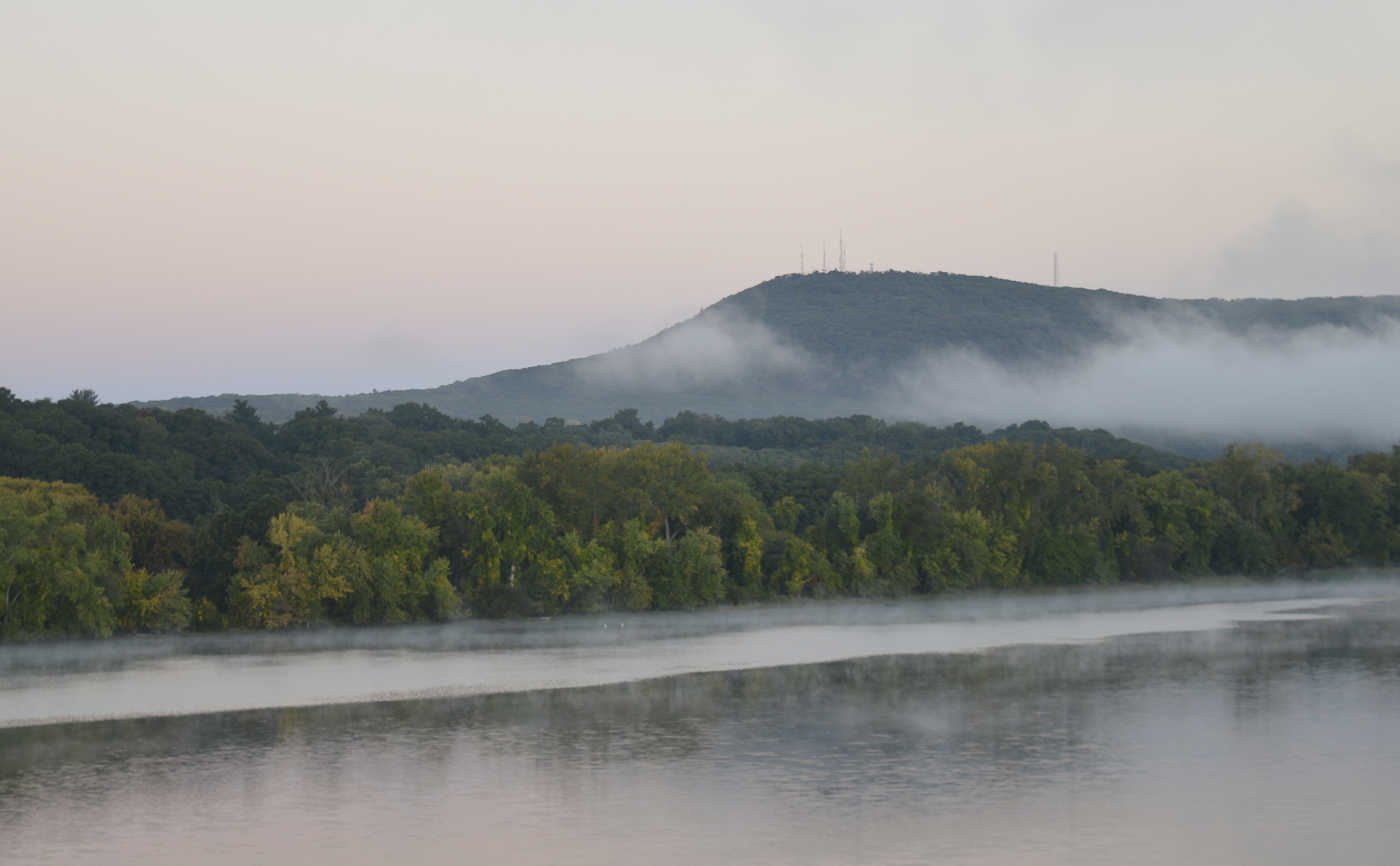
Mount Tom rising above a cloud of fog

There are two state parks in Holyoke maintained by the Commonwealth's Department of Conservation and Recreation, the largest being the Mount Tom State Reservation, as well as the urban Holyoke Heritage State Park, which was built on the site of the former Skinner Silk Mill, adjacent to City Hall.

The Trustees of Reservations maintain a number of parks in the city, including the Dinosaur Footprints Reservation, Land of Providence, and Little Tom Mountain. The latter, once part of the Mount Tom Ski Area, has remained closed since the ski resort shuttered in 1998, and was subsequently purchased in part by the Trustees, along with the U.S. Fish & Wildlife Service, Holyoke Boys & Girls Club. In recent years there has been discussion of reopening the property as a nature camp, or potentially as a special permit skiing area, not unlike Mount Snow, but while some have still used the remaining ski slopes in recent years, the area has been subject to vandalism and remains closed with no plans for reopening agreed on by its landholders.

== Government and politics ==
County-level state agency heads
Clerk of Courts:	Laura S. Gentile (D)
District Attorney:	Anthony Gulluni (D)
Register of Deeds:	Cheryl Coakley-Rivera (D)
Register of Probate:	Suzanne Seguin (I)
County Sheriff:	Nicholas Cocchi (D)
State government
State Representative(s):	Patricia Duffy (D)
State Senator(s):	John Velis (D)
Governor's Councilor(s):	Tara Jacobs (D)
Federal government
U.S. Representative(s):	Richard Neal (D-1st District),
U.S. Senators:	Elizabeth Warren (D), Ed Markey (D)

Holyoke has a strong mayor–council government in which the executive historically has broad powers to appoint officials or commissions directly to perform the same function and to present an initial budget before the city council. Taken into consideration with the authority of the city council, the office, however, has been described by the Massachusetts state government as having limited executive powers. For example, the mayor retains appointment of the chief of police directly, including terms of their contract, as well as the three members of the fire commission, without council approval. The fire commission, however, has exclusive authority to appoint or suspend the chief and other officers. Other municipal positions such as treasurer or city clerk are elected directly, unless said officeholder is appointed by the mayor in an acting capacity. In 2015 voters passed a resolution raising mayoral terms from two to four years. In 2021, Joshua A. Garcia was elected, and assumed the remainder of the term of Terence Murphy on November 15, 2021, who had assumed the office in an acting capacity.

Holyoke's legislative body is its City Council, which features seven ward representatives and six councilors at large. Historic records refer to the city council as the "Board of Aldermen" until its name changed in 1992; however, the title also reflected a separate body. From 1874 until 1896, the City Council was bicameral; the Board of Aldermen consisted of seven at-large members, and a Common Council of 21 presided with three representatives per ward. From the ratification of the 1896 charter until the 1950s, the common council was eliminated and the Board comprised 21 members with 14 at-large, subsequently changed to eight at-large and seven ward members. In 2015 the city voted to reduce the number of councilors from 15 to 13, removing two at-large seats and creating a majority of ward-based seats. The City Council passes the city's final budget, holds hearings, creates departments and commissions, and amends zoning laws.

The city government comprises 33 offices, departments, and agencies, including utilities that are municipally owned and operated: Holyoke Gas and Electric and the Holyoke Water Works.

In the Massachusetts House of Representatives, Holyoke is represented by Patricia Duffy of the 5th Hampden District, which is conterminous with the city's boundaries. The city's state senator is John Velis, of the 2nd Hampshire and Hampden District. It is part of the Eighth Massachusetts Governor's Council district, represented by Tara Jacobs. In the United States Congress the city is represented by Richard Neal of the state's 1st district, and senators Elizabeth Warren and Edward Markey.

Politically, the city's largest block of voters are those belonging to no political party, but the city has long supported candidates from the Democratic Party by a wide margin. In the 2012 elections, voters supported President Barack Obama over Mitt Romney by a margin of 76–22%, and Elizabeth Warren over incumbent Senator Scott Brown 70–30%. Holyoke elected an openly gay mayor, Alex Morse, in the 2011 municipal election. Republicans have made gains in recent years, however, following the national trend of Hispanic Americans shifting to the right.

Voter registration and party enrollment as of February 2, 2025
Party	Number of voters	Percentage
Democratic	9,099	29.65%
Republican	2,006	5.94%
Unenrolled	19,428	63.31%
Other	339	1.10%
Total	30,689	100%

=== Public safety ===
Holyoke maintains a full-service law enforcement agency, the Holyoke Police Department, established in the 1850s. As of August 2024 the department employed 88 sworn employees.

After the collapse of Holyoke's industrial base in the 1970s, the city began to see civil unrest, which gained notoriety both in state and national coverage; a wave of crime set in and the population declined nearly 20% from 1970 to 1990. Since then, crime has gradually declined, with an increased state police presence, and greater state socio-economic support programs. Since 2011, state and federal authorities have worked with the Holyoke Police Department in a Safe Neighborhood Initiative, attempting to suppress gang violence and creating greater after-school programming and opportunities for at-risk youth. The demographic has been described by Massachusetts' Shannon Community Safety Initiative as those most affected by violent crime in the city. In 2016, the HPD estimated 3 out of 4 violent crimes were committed by an estimated 589 gang members between Holyoke and Chicopee, often with members being offenders and victims in turf battles over narcotics trafficking.

Between 2010 and 2018, the violent crime rate for Holyoke decreased by approximately 14.6%, whereas the property crime rate declined by 26.5%; both rates remain more than twice their respective state averages, as of 2018.

The Holyoke Fire Department responds to fires and other emergencies within the city. Emergency Medical Services are contracted to a private ambulance company. The contract is currently held by Cataldo Ambulance Service.

== Media ==
=== Newspapers ===
The Republican, based in Springfield, and the Daily Hampshire Gazette of Northampton are the two daily newspapers regularly covering the city. Holyoke's own newspaper of record, the Holyoke Transcript-Telegram, which had been connected with the city since its founding under several variations of that name, ceased publication in 1993. Since then, Holyoke has not had its own daily news source but has been served by the weekly Holyoke Sun, managed by Turley Publications, which began publication in 1995. On September 16, 2019, the Daily Hampshire Gazette announced that it was expanding its coverage to Holyoke full-time, opening a bureau there.

Since 2004 the area has also been covered by the bilingual monthly El Sol Latino; published independently out of Amherst, it covers the news of the Pioneer Valley's Puerto Rican community, with considerable coverage given to Holyoke. The Republican also publishes a free Spanish-language weekly known as El Pueblo Latino, with distribution mainly in Springfield and Holyoke. Historically Holyoke has had numerous non-English-language news publications. Between 1874 and 1910 more than twelve French newspapers were published. Many of them were printed for only a matter of weeks, abd the best documented, the weekly La Justice, was published from 1909 to 1964, being biweekly in its last six years. Another prominent example was the Polish language Gwiazda, or Polish Weekly-Star, among the best documented of at least four such publications.

=== Radio and television ===
Holyoke is served by radio stations in the Springfield market, including its own WCCH, Holyoke Community College's radio station, Mount Holyoke College's WMHC of South Hadley, and WMUA of UMass Amherst. A Christian radio station WREA also broadcasts Spanish-language religious programming from a studio in downtown Holyoke.

In addition to television stations serving the Springfield market, the city is also home to Holyoke Media, a public-access media non-profit.

=== Film ===
In its history many smaller productions have been filmed in Holyoke, as well a handful of notable pictures including the neo-noir film Malice (1993) and mystery horror drama The Reincarnation of Peter Proud (1975). The city served as a filming location for the 1977 bodybuilding documentary Pumping Iron, as Mountain Park then held bodybuilding championships at its Clambake Pavilion. The Holyoke Merry-Go-Round was also the setting of a music video sequence in the 2007 British documentary Young@Heart, chronicling a New England chorus of elders from Northampton who cover classic and contemporary rock songs.

== Infrastructure ==
=== Healthcare ===
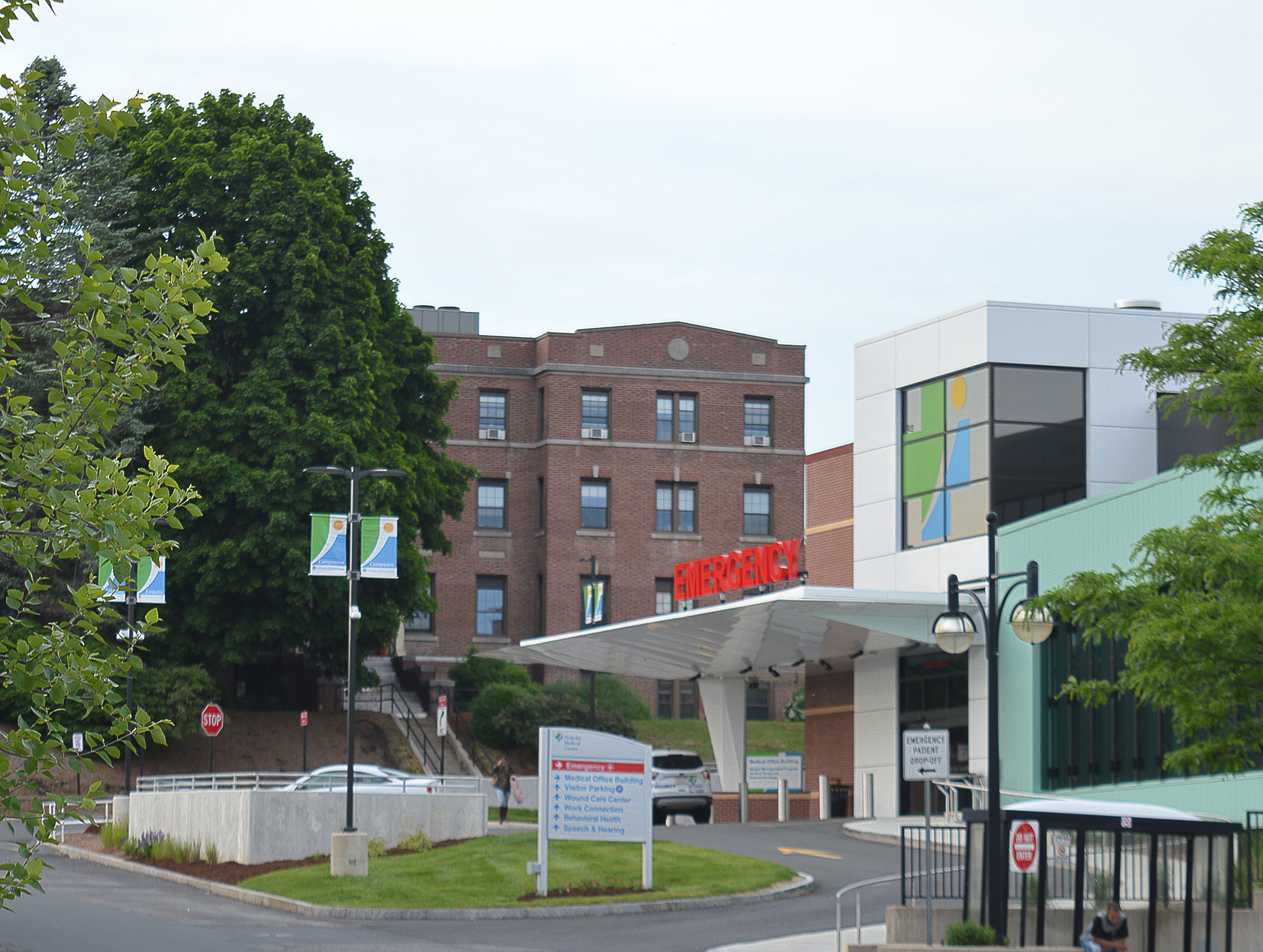
Emergency department of Holyoke Medical Center

The Holyoke Medical Center offers comprehensive health services. It was named a top hospital by The Leapfrog Group in 2016, and in 2018 received multiple awards for its stroke care from the Paul Coverdell National Acute Stroke Program of the Massachusetts Department of Public Health, and the American Heart Association. The city's Providence Behavioral Health Hospital offers a number of programs for psychiatric health as well, with emphasis on new substance abuse treatment programs. It has been affiliated with the Sisters of Providence of Holyoke, who have operated medical facilities in the city since they first received their charter in 1892.

The Soldiers' Home in Holyoke is one of two state-operated veterans healthcare facilities in the Commonwealth, offering longterm residential care as well as outpatient services to Massachusetts veterans. In 2018, the facility received high marks from the Department of Veterans Affairs, showing improved safety measures for elderly residents and no deficiencies in provided care.

=== Telecom and public fiber ===
Since September 1997, the city's municipal utility, Holyoke Gas & Electric, has provided fiber optic high-speed internet service to municipal agencies, as well as commercial and industrial businesses. The network would also play a decisive role in the location of the Massachusetts Green High Performance Computing Center in the city because of its 1 gbps service offered to commercial customers, and a dedicated link exceeding 10 gbps for the facility's educational affiliates, on specialized networks such as Internet2.

The municipal fiber line network has also served as an internet service provider to other area towns, including commercial customers in Chicopee, Metro Center Springfield, and Greenfield (until 2017), as well as network operator to residential customers in Leverett. With renewed public interest in net neutrality, civic groups have rallied for the city to offer a limited or complete rollout of the fiber-to-the-home service in Holyoke and Chicopee. However, despite orders by the council to further explore the measure, no immediate plan for residential service had been given by the municipal utility as of 2018. On November 6, 2019, city voters passed a nonbinding question calling for a feasibility study and cost estimate of a gradual rollout of residential service.

=== Transportation ===
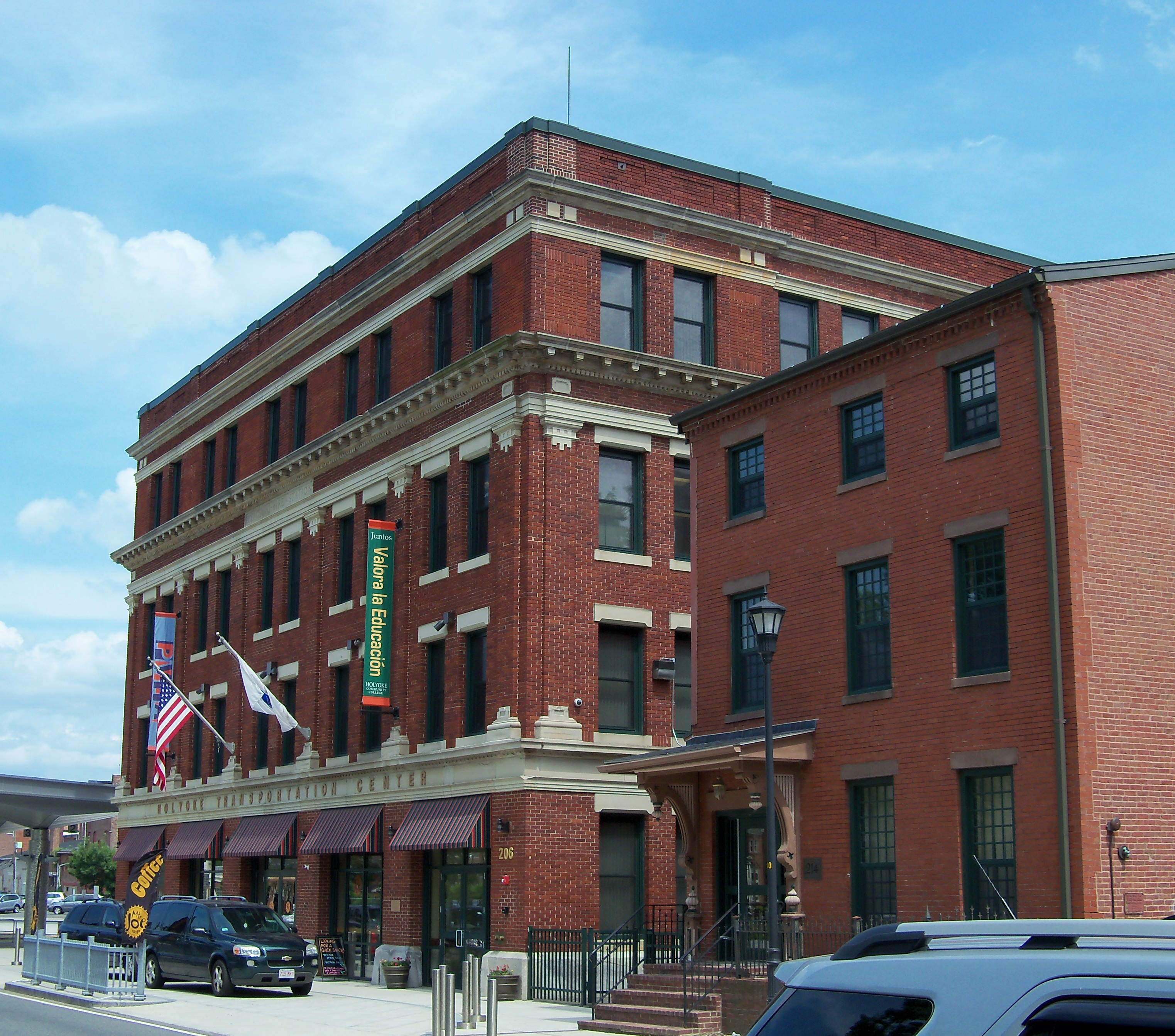
The Holyoke Transportation Center, serving riders of the PVTA and Peter Pan Buslines

==== Highways ====
Interstate highways serving Greater Holyoke include:

- I-91 – North to Northampton, Hatfield, Greenfield, and South to Springfield, Hartford.
- I-391 – South to Chicopee, and Springfield.

Immediately south of Holyoke is the Massachusetts Turnpike, accessible from exit 14 on I-91 South:

- I-90 – East to Worcester and Boston, and West to Stockbridge, and Albany

U.S. Highways serving Greater Holyoke include:

- US 5 – Running from Ingleside to Smith's Ferry, connecting West Springfield to Easthampton and Northampton.
- US 202 – Running from South Hadley via the Joseph E. Muller Bridge to Westfield, Massachusetts.

Massachusetts highways in the area include:

- Route 116 – A minor freeway bypassing downtown Holyoke, connecting Chicopee to South Hadley via the Willimansett Bridge and the Vietnam Memorial Bridge.
- Route 141 – A minor freeway connecting Easthampton over Mount Tom, through downtown via Appleton Street and Main Street in South Holyoke to Chicopee via I-391.

==== Bus and rail ====
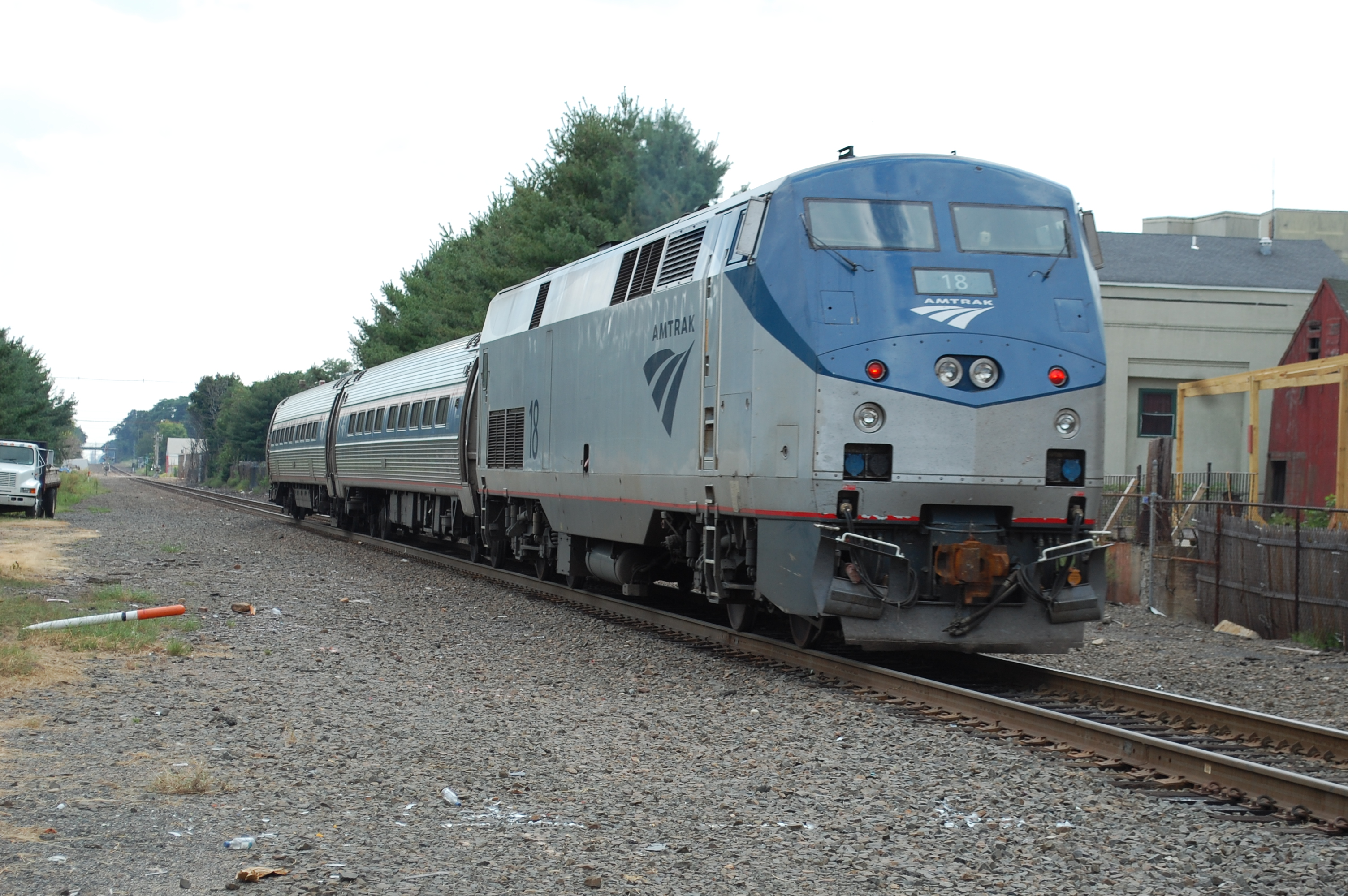
A two-car train for the New Haven–Springfield Shuttle, which was scheduled to begin commuter rail service to Holyoke in a pilot program starting in spring 2019

Several buses from the Pioneer Valley Transit Authority operate in the city including the Paper City Express with a route across town as well as routes to South Hadley, Westfield, Northampton, Amherst, and Springfield, connecting with Peter Pan Buslines at the Holyoke Transportation Center.

Passenger rail service returned to Holyoke in August 2015, after being absent since 1967. Amtrak's Vermonter stops at the Holyoke station once a day in each direction, and the Valley Flyer commenced in Spring 2019 linking Holyoke to adjacent stations in Northampton and Springfield, as far north as Greenfield and south as New Haven, Connecticut, with two trains operating in the morning and the evening. The route links travelers as far north as Greenfield and as far south as New Haven, Connecticut, with connections to New York City on Amtrak and Metro-North Railroad.

Freight rail service is provided to the city's industrial and warehouse railways in Springdale, South Holyoke, and The Flats by the Pioneer Valley Railroad, with connections to Pan Am Southern to Springfield and Greenfield, and a line to Westfield with connections to Southampton and the CSX system. The PVRR also provides annual fall foliage passenger rides from the Holyoke Heritage State Park to Westfield, and an annual Santa Train at the park.

==== Airports ====
General aviation service is close by, at Westover Metropolitan Airport and Northampton Airport. The closest major domestic and limited international air service is available through Bradley International Airport (BDL) in Windsor Locks, Connecticut.

==== Cycling and walking ====
Taken in its entirety, Holyoke has a moderate Walk Score of 55, though walkability is highly variable between neighborhoods. For example, whereas the rural neighborhood of Rock Valley is entirely car-dependent with a score of 3, the downtown area, with its grid central to stores, residences, and businesses, yields a Walk Score of 84.

In an effort to make the mixed industrial and residential area around the canals more accessible, the city has in recent years constructed the eponymous Canalwalk, a series of walkways linking the downtown to The Flats and South Holyoke.

== Environment ==
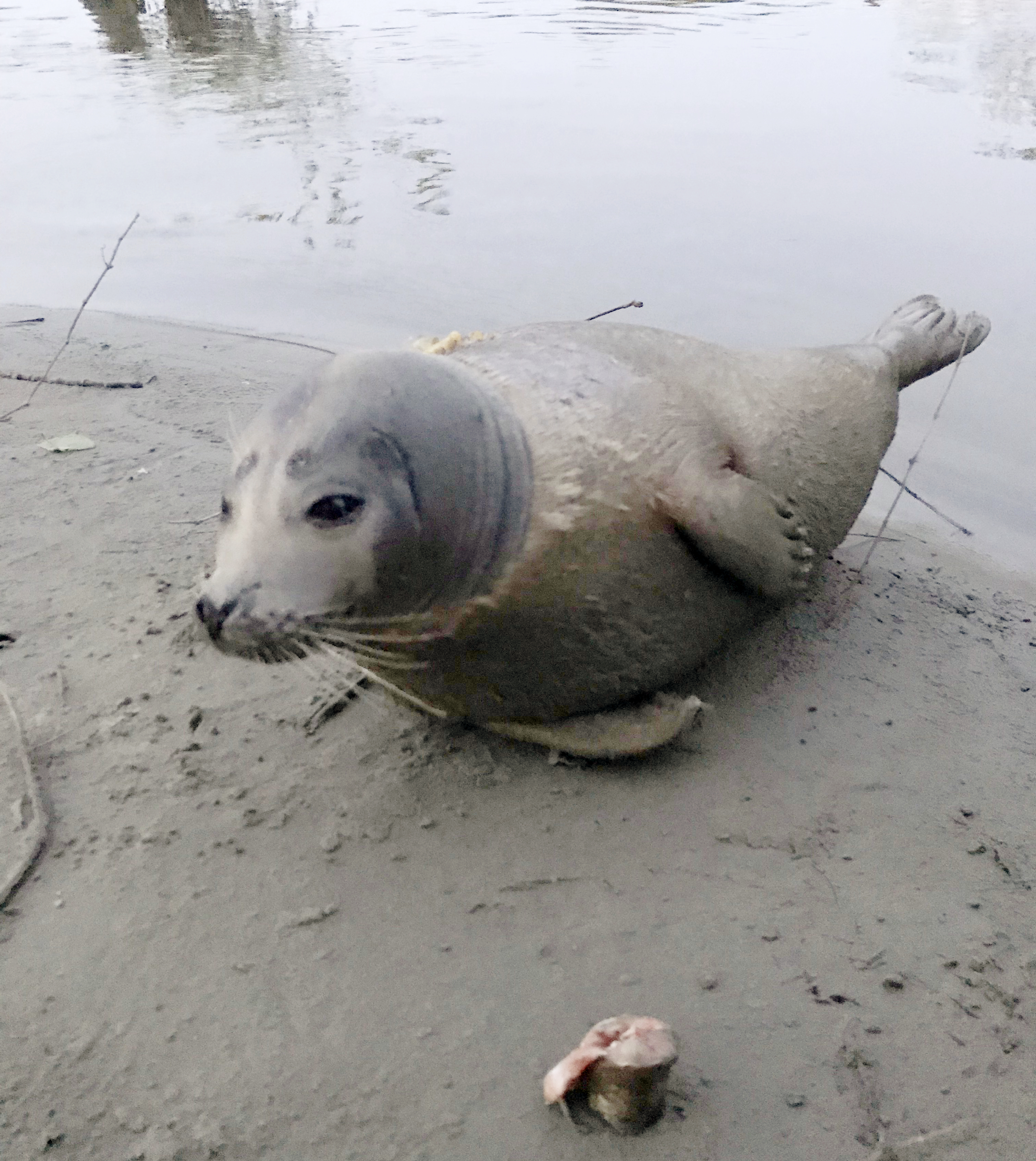
Laysan, a tagged harbor seal briefly residing by the shad-laden waters near the Holyoke Dam

Despite its industrial history, Holyoke contains no Superfund sites. One of the greatest producers of pollution in the area was the former Mount Tom Station, a coal plant in Smith's Ferry. Citizens cited higher rates of asthma, attributing them to the plant and after many years of discussion it was finally shuttered in December 2014. In October 2016 ground was broken at the site for the construction of a new solar farm.

=== Flora and fauna ===
A combination of MassWildlife's Natural Heritage & Endangered Species Program and of public health protections for the watershed of the Holyoke Water Works has caused much of the city's area west of Interstate 91 to be designated for limited development and often to require additional permitting. Of the city's 14,605 acres, approximate 8,105 along the Metacomet Ridge and Mount Tom Range have been identified as core habitat for the more than 242 species of vertebrates extant in the city's boundaries, and of that area, about 52% of its acreage is managed by municipal, state, and federal agencies, with sustainable development plans in place to encourage development within the city's dense grid to the east. Of the wildlife identified in Holyoke, there are 29 species of fish, 21 of amphibians, 18 of reptiles, at least 160 species of birds including ruby-throated hummingbirds and bald eagles, as well as 42 species of mammals such as black bears and moose. In recent years the area has seen a growing black bear population, with the occasional individual wandering into the downtown center.

== Global outreach ==
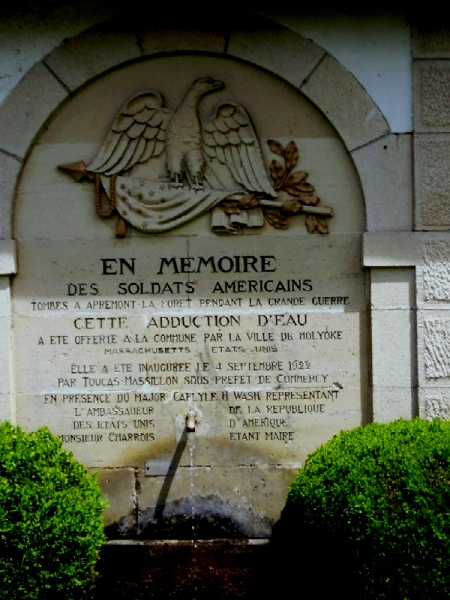
A memorial plaque in Apremont, France, to the American soldiers who fought and died there, and honoring the city's gift of water during the village's reconstruction

Holyoke has in the past established sister city relationships with cities abroad, including:

- Svaliava, Zakarpattia Oblast, Ukraine (1997)
- Tralee, Ireland (2017)

Less formal relationships representing symbolic and technical exchanges have also been established with the following cities:

- Montreal, Quebec, Canada (1888), on January 26, 1888, a delegation from Montreal was received by Mayor Delaney. Arriving by train, they comprised 200 members of Le Canadien and La Trappeur snowshoe clubs, as well as Laurent-Olivier David MP, former Mayor and folklorist Honoré Beaugrand, and Québecois poet laureate Louis Fréchette. In the midst of an evening snowstorm, they were greeted by 10,000 residents and a grand fireworks display. Throughout the night, several French and English speeches were made at city hall, before an audience including reporters from several Franco-American newspapers, with a speech by Delaney lamenting the tragic Precious Blood Church fire, and a tribute by Beaugrand honoring President Cleveland.
- Beijing, Qing China (1906), in May 1906, Chen Jintao, (Note: Referred to by contemporary Western documents in the Wade–Giles Romanization as "Ch'en Chin-t'ao" or "Chintao Chen.") regarded as China's first foreign scholar, was sent to the city on assignment to study its budding paper-making industry and infrastructure, reporting back to the Chinese government after a month of observation. He would be received not only by mill owners but the city government itself, including city engineer James Tighe, who would show him the infrastructure of the Holyoke Reservoir System. Chen, possibly a member of the Tongmenghui, would go on to serve numerous important roles in both the Qing and Republic of China governments, including Acting Minister of Foreign Affairs for the latter.
- Dublin, United Kingdom of Great Britain and Ireland (1906), on November 9, 1906, two Irish envoys were received by Mayor Avery, Richard Hazleton MP, and Tom Kettle MP, both Irish nationalist home-rule advocates touring the United States for the cause. Avery was granted the chairman's position at the meeting held at Saint Jerome's Institute, and over the course of the evening several speeches were made by the guests and others in the Irish community describing the realities of British rule and progress made toward independence, with parallels drawn between the independence of the United States. Some $700, about $20,000 in 2017 US Dollars, was raised by the crowd for the Irish Parliamentary Party by the end of the evening.
- Apremont-la-Forêt, Meuse, France (1919), at the end of World War I, in honor of the fallen of the 104th Infantry, the city provided the village a new waterworks, public bath, and a community center under relief efforts led by Belle Skinner. In honor of those contributions, the village renamed its town square Place d'Holyoke and its main street Rue Belle Skinner. In 1930 a former supply route built by soldiers of the regiment was dedicated in Massachusetts as the Apremont Highway in a joint ceremony between Holyoke and Westfield.
- San Juan, Puerto Rico (2018), in the wake of Hurricane Maria many Puerto Ricans sought refuge with family in Holyoke, with more than 235 additional students enrolling in Holyoke public schools in the year following the natural disaster; on April 27, 2018, a key to the city was presented to San Juan Mayor Carmen Yulín Cruz by Mayor Alex Morse to honor that "in such a time of despair [she] provided a beacon of hope and opportunity for Puerto Ricans" in the city's community, and for her leadership in the wake of Hurricane Maria.

== See also ==
- List of mill towns in Massachusetts
