= Holyoke Dam =

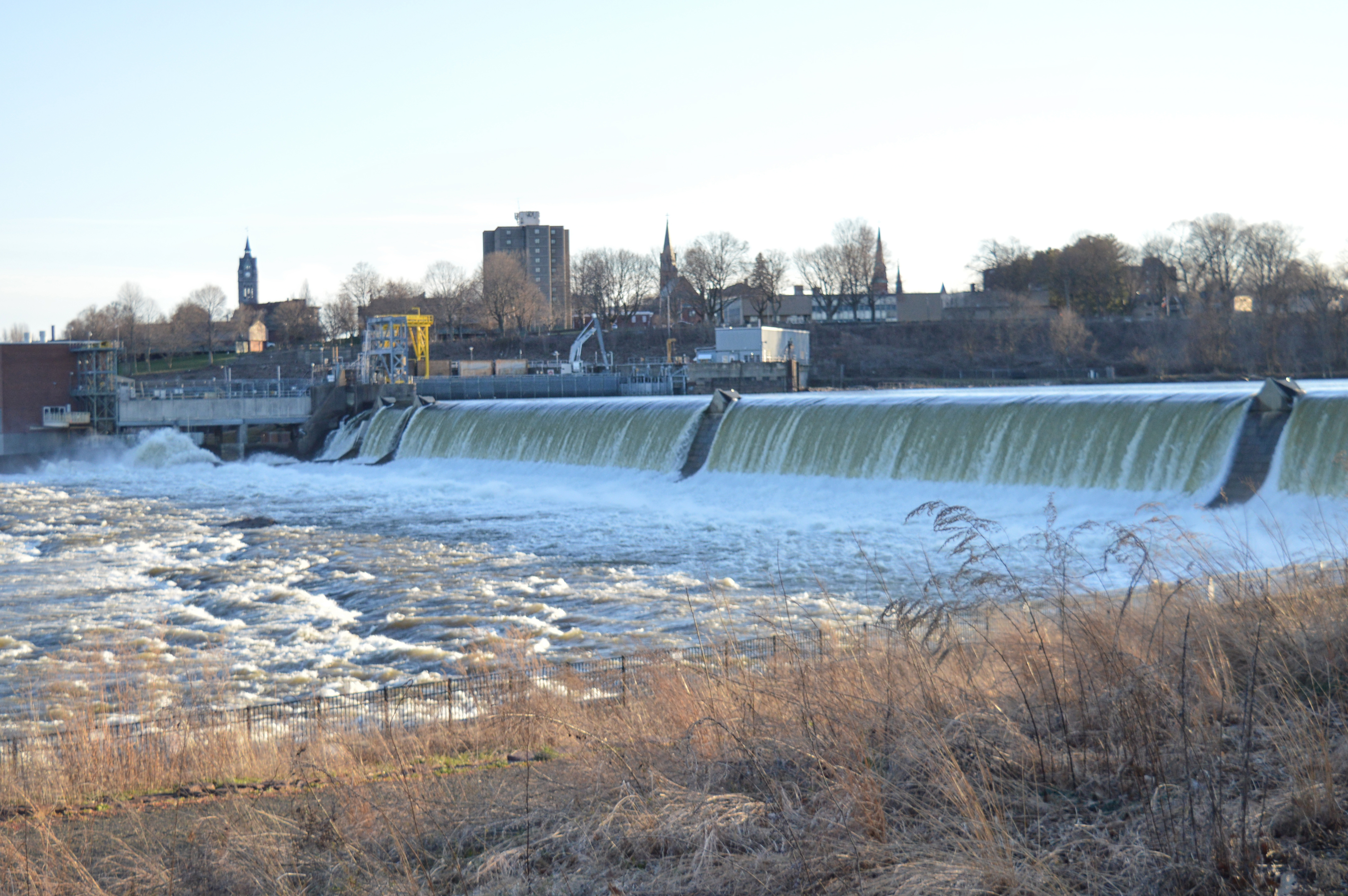
- Holyoke Dam during spring thaw

- Location of Holyoke Dam in the western Massachusetts, USA
- Country: United States
- Location: Hampden County and Hampshire County Massachusetts
- Coordinates: 42°12′49″N 72°36′06″W
- Purpose: Power, regulation, industrial
- Status: Operational
- Construction began: 1895
- Opening date: 1900 (126 years ago)
- Construction cost: ≈$1,000,000 (1900)
- Built by: Fruin-Baurbrick; H. S. Hopkins, St. Louis
- Owner: Holyoke Gas & Electric
- Operator: Holyoke Gas & Electric

Dam and spillways
- Type of dam: Granite gravity
- Impounds: Connecticut River
- Height (foundation): 30 ft (33.5 ft while rubber bladder is inflated)
- Length: 1,020 ft (310 m)
- Elevation at crest: 94.6 ft (28.8 m)

The Holyoke Dam, also referred to as the Hadley Falls Dam, Million Dollar Dam, or Hadley Falls Station is a granite dam built in tandem with the Holyoke Canal System at Hadley Falls on the Connecticut River, between Holyoke and South Hadley, Massachusetts. The water differential created by the dam produced mechanical hydropower for industrial uses in Holyoke, and later hydroelectric power.

The current dam is the third structure to be built across the Great Falls at South Hadley. The dam, along with the Canal System and its Testing Flume, is recognized by the American Society of Mechanical Engineers as a Historic Mechanical Engineering Landmark for its use by Clemens Herschel in the development of the Venturi meter, the first means of measuring large-scale flows, and the McCormick-Holyoke Turbine by John B. McCormick, also known as the Hercules Turbine, which doubled the efficiency of turbines to more than 80% in its time.

== Background ==
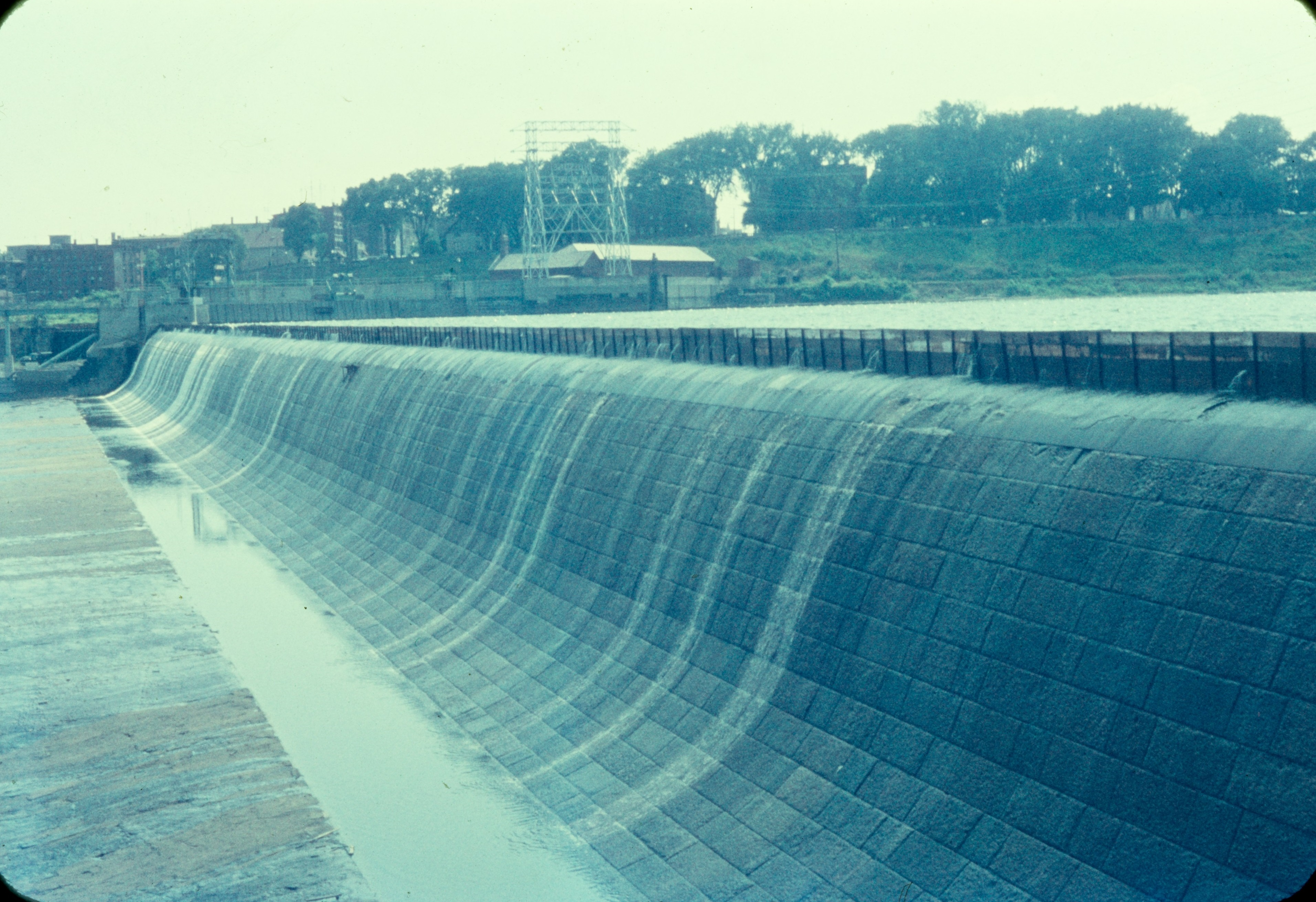
A photo showing an older flashboard system of the Holyoke Dam and the Canal System's original gatehouse

The river between Holyoke and South Hadley contained what was known as the "Great Falls" a natural 53-foot (16 m) drop in the river approximately 86 miles upstream of the Atlantic Ocean. Following the success of the textile mills in the planned industrial city of Lowell, Massachusetts in the early 1800s, a group of investors sought to imitate this city along a natural curve in the Connecticut River. George C. Ewing, a sales representative of Fairbanks and Co., marked part of what was then known as West Springfield, as a site for future development. By the fall of 1847, Ewing, acting as land agent for the investors involved, obtained possession of 1200 acres of land on the west bank of the Connecticut river at Hadley Falls for the purpose of establishing an industrial city. A charter was obtained from the Massachusetts Legislature in the winter of 1847-1848 under the name of the Hadley Falls Co. with a capital of four million dollars. In the summer of 1848 a timber crib dam was constructed across the Connecticut River at the Great Falls. The engineer of the first two dams, as well as the layout of Holyoke's grid and canals was Philander Anderson, C.E.

== First Dam ==
Constructed using a timber frame, the dam was filled with rubble and stone and was completed in a matter of months. Upon completion the gates were closed at 10AM and the reservoir behind the dam began to fill. As recorded in Harper's Weekly, “The engineer took great pride in his work, and when it was finished, and the gates shut down, he is said to have irreverently exclaimed: ‘There! Those gates are shut, and God Almighty himself can not open them!’” By noon the timber dam had sprung massive leaks, and the footing began to show signs of weakness at 2:00PM. The dam had not been properly secured to bedrock and at 3:20PM the dam gave way and a torrent of water, logs and debris headed downstream towards Chicopee, Massachusetts. A foreman sent a telegram to investors in Boston which read, "3:20 p.m., your dam has gone to hell by way of Willimansett."

Writing in 1929, one Arthur E. Ferry recalled the scene as he had experienced it as a child-

“Some comical things happened on the day mentioned. For instance: After the gates in the dam were closed, the water soon drained off from the river bed, and men and teams were in there getting out building stones, and many people were walking about, picking up shells and relics, until warning was shouted that they were in danger, and then there was a lively scramble to get to safety. I have in mind several Belchertown men who were in there, but especially do I remember Mr. James H. Clapp. He was a portly man and came struggling and puffing up the bank, and seeing my father and Mr. Ebenezer Warner, he reached out his hands and cried frantically, ‘Devil, Devil, Warner, help me up!’

It was a frightful scene, with such an immense body of water full of timbers plunging down end over end, and people screaming with fright.

I suppose there are few people living who saw that catastrophe, because most people die before they are as old as I am. There were but few children there, and I was not quite seven years old.”

== Second Dam ==
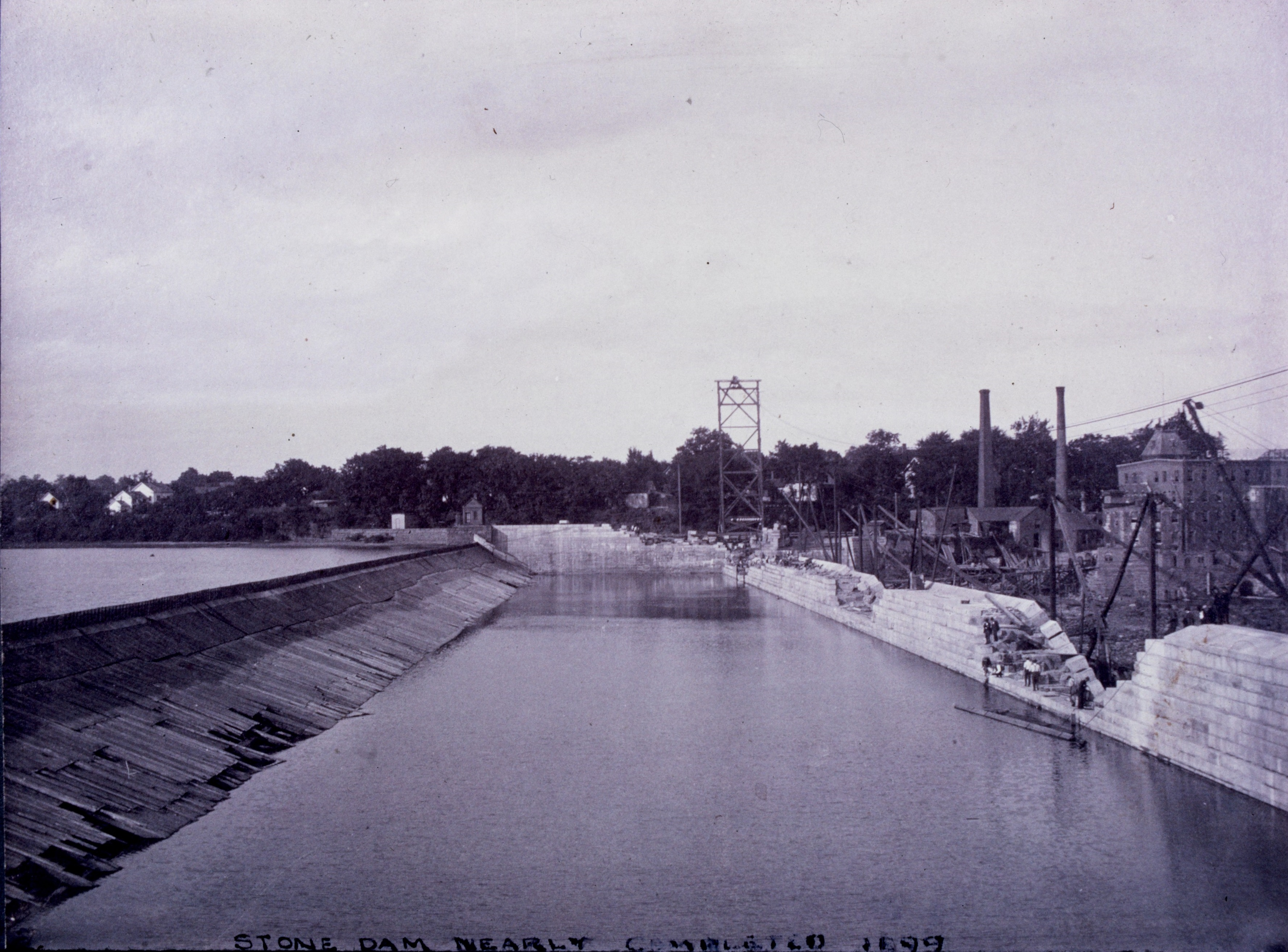
The second timber dam (left), and current granite dam (right) during construction in 1898

The second dam which would define the city's industrial prowess in the 19th century was completed the following year in 1849. Initially built as effectively a wall of wooden timbers, concerns eventually arose that the water's velocity pouring over the dam was eroding the rocks upon which it stood, and it was described by a paper of the Engineers' Club of Philadelphia as "simply built with the wrong face up stream", where a sloping structure in the opposite direction would have been ideal. Furthermore the vibration of the waterfall on the rocks led to synchronous vibrations in doors and windows on many of the surrounding mills and worker housing. To remedy this, from 1868 to 1870 an apron was constructed of large timbers and rocks which mitigated the aforementioned vibrations, however the angle at which it sloped and the geology of rocks immediately below only ensured that the erosion continued. As early as 1884 the Holyoke Water Power Company, manufacturers, and city officials called for the construction of an improved stone structure which would address these issues and ensure the sustainability of the hydropower in the future, a considerable undertaking at the time as the wooden dam was then the 2nd largest dam in the country at that time by length, exceeded only by the Fairmount Dam in Philadelphia. In a conference with the city's manufacturers that year, the Water Power Company announced it had begun a fund toward the development of the replacement dam, which would not see construction commence until 11 years thereafter, and completed in nearly 16.

== Present structure ==
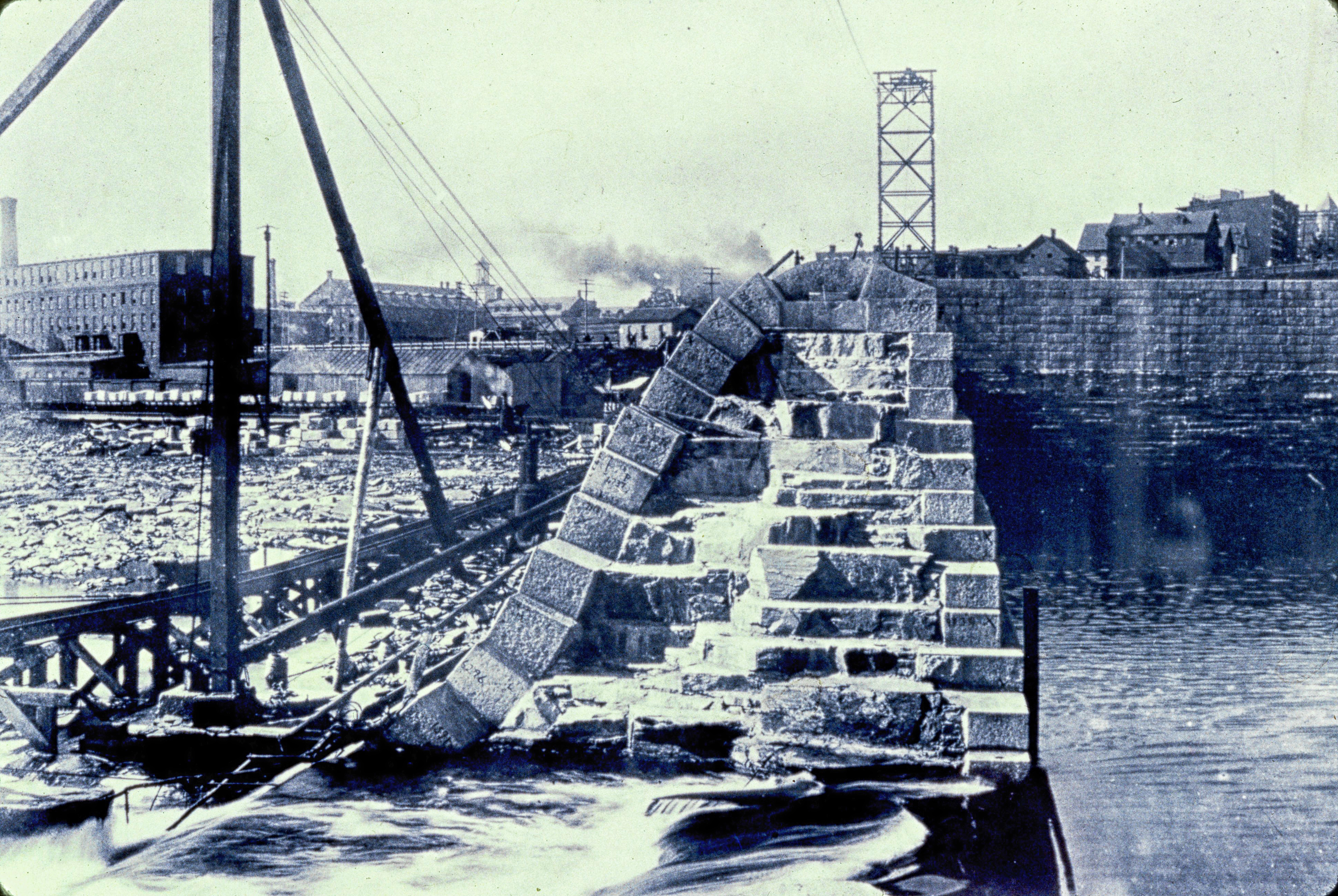
A cross-section photo of stone dam during construction in the late 1890s

Construction of the third and current dam began in 1895, with the final stone laid on January 5, 1900. At the time of its construction it employed a narrow gauge railroad for movement of base stone, as well as what was then the longest cableway in the world, suspended from either end of the Connecticut River to move stones into the higher reaches of the structure.

The Holyoke Water Power Company merged with Northeast Utilities in 1967. NU sold the dam and generating stations to Holyoke Gas & Electric, a municipal corporation, in 2001.

== Hydroelectric power ==
Though other parts of the canal system (which are downstream of the dam) started generating hydroelectricity in the late 1800s, the dam itself did not do so until 1950. The two units at the Hadley Falls Station are rated at a combined 33 MW, with other hydroelectric generation in the system collectively producing 15 MW.

== Fish elevator ==
On the south side of the dam, the Robert E. Barrett Fishway includes a spillway and an elevator that lifts fish headed upstream (along with river water) over the dam. A glass viewing area allows the public to watch fish migrate. It is named to commemorate Robert E. Barrett, former President of Holyoke Water Power, who instigated the fishway in 1955.

== See also ==
- Holyoke Canal System
