= Holyoke Testing Flume =

Defunct American hydraulic laboratory (1870-1932)

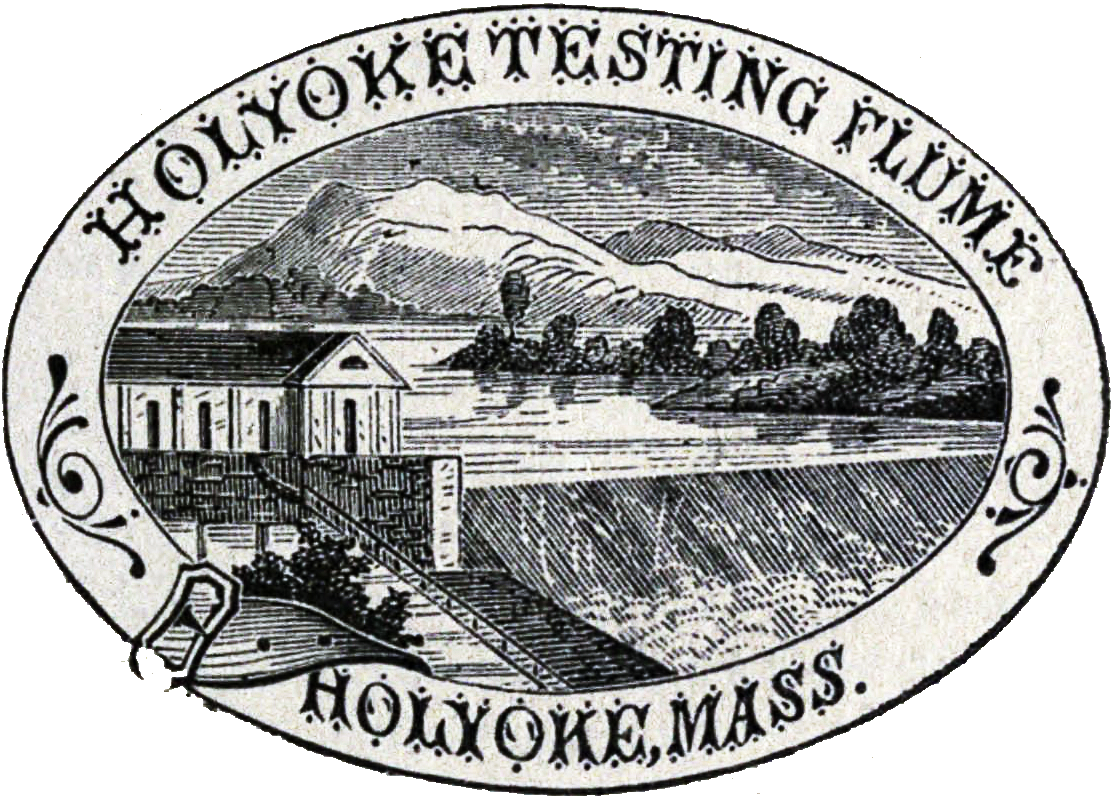

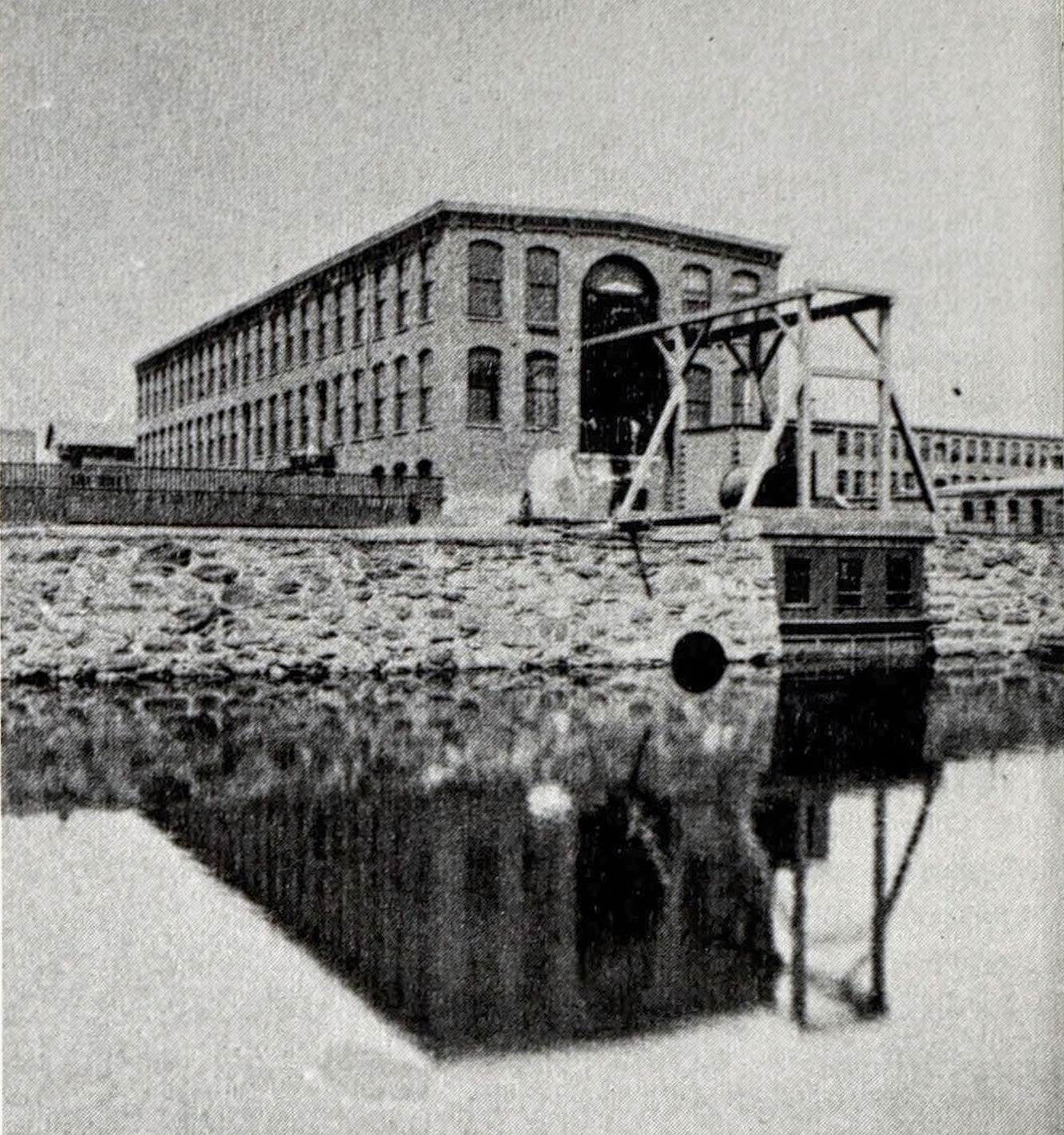
- The testing flume as seen from Race Street, circa 1895
- Established: 1870; 156 years ago
- Research type: Industrial
- Field of research: Hydraulic engineering
- Director: James B. Emerson (1870–1879); Clemens Herschel (1879–1889); Albert F. Sickman (1890 - c. 1925) (Note: In a 1915 court deposition Sickman was described as the hydraulic engineer in charge of hydraulic testing but his counsel objected to him being described as the "chief hydraulic engineer" despite having no superiors.)
- Location: 102 Cabot Street, Holyoke, Massachusetts, U.S. 42.199580°N 72.609826°W
- Campus: Holyoke Canal System
- Affiliations: Holyoke Water Power Company
- Location within Holyoke Location within Massachusetts Location within the United States

The Holyoke Testing Flume was a hydraulic testing laboratory and apparatus in Holyoke, Massachusetts, operated by the Holyoke Water Power Company from 1870 to 1932, and used to test the performance of water turbine designs, completing 3,176 tests of efficiency in that time. It was described by Robert E. Horton in court testimony as the only facility of its kind in the 19th and early 20th century, which made possible the standardization of American water turbines. Indeed Clemens Herschel, who managed and redesigned the facility in the 1880s, later described it in Congressional testimony as the "first modern hydraulic laboratory" in the United States and the world. It was through Herschel's need to determine the water power consumption of different mills, and in this testing system that he would invent the Venturi meter, the first accurate means of measuring large-scale flows, which still retains widespread use in modern technology today.

== Research programs ==
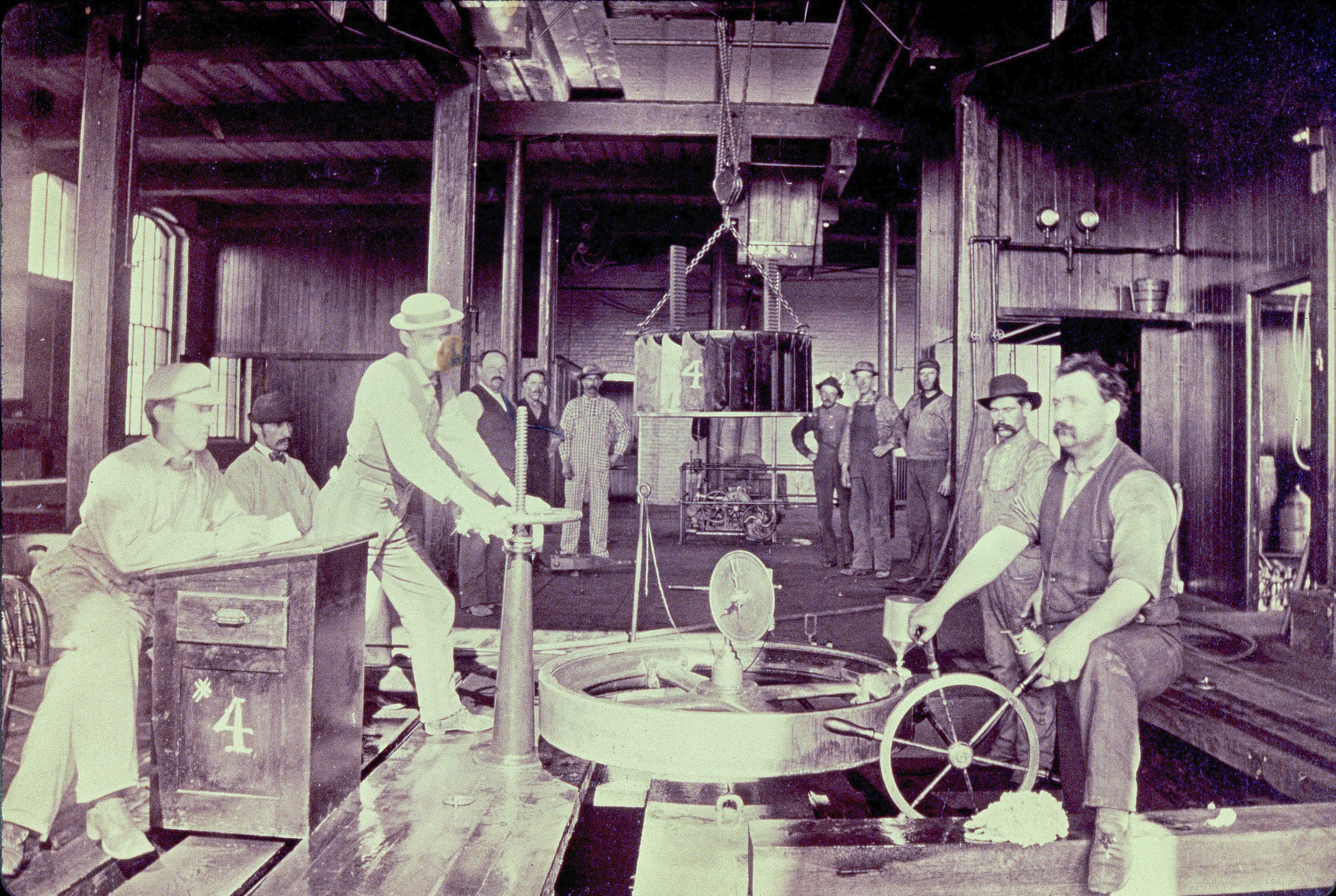
Workers at their stations prior to testing a turbine wheel design, c. 1895

In a 1906 report the research mission for the facility was described as threefold:

1. The testing of all wheels installed in conjunction with the water power at Holyoke, in order that their discharge capacity may be determined and used as a means of estimating the quantity of water taken by the several mills.

2. The testing of experimental wheels with a view to their improvement.

3. [The t]esting of standard patterns of American type turbines which are to be installed in new plants.

== History ==
=== Emerson's predecessors ===
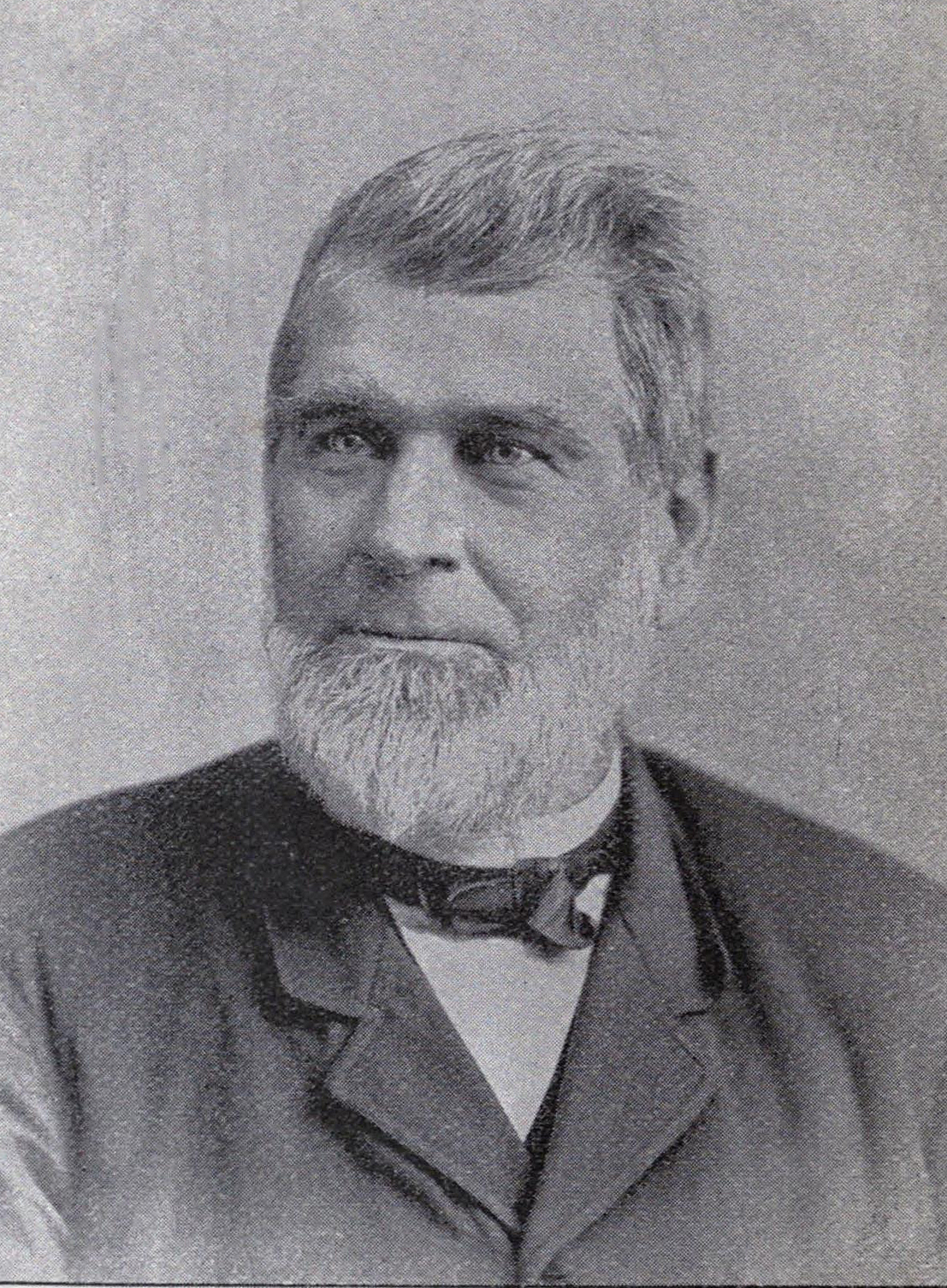
James Emerson, the first to manage the testing flume was entirely self-taught in hydrodynamics

The origins of the Holyoke Water Power Company's testing flume and its subsequent success are inextricably linked with the industrial progress that preceded Holyoke in the history of Lowell, Massachusetts. In 1868, a testing flume was constructed by one Asa M. Swain to the specifications of noted-turbine engineer James B. Francis. Initially this flume was designed to test the designs of the Swain Turbine Company with James B. Emerson, a former ship captain and self-taught civil engineer, commissioned to construct a Prony brake dynamometer for it and oversee efficiency experiments. Following its initial success however, the flume was opened to the public with Emerson operating it as a personal endeavor, furnishing funds for the use of Lowell water in its experiments. Among the first tests conducted thereafter were a series of competitive trials to find designs with the greatest efficiency, with the Swain and Leffel wheels attaining the best results. Though Emerson would later discount the figures these tests generated, upon hearing the initial success of the competition, he was contacted by a Mr. Stewart Chase, agent for the Holyoke Water Power Company, who wrote:

The testing of turbines is the only way to perfection, and that is a matter of great importance. Move your work to Holyoke and use all the water that is necessary for the purpose, and welcome, free of charge.

== Legacy ==
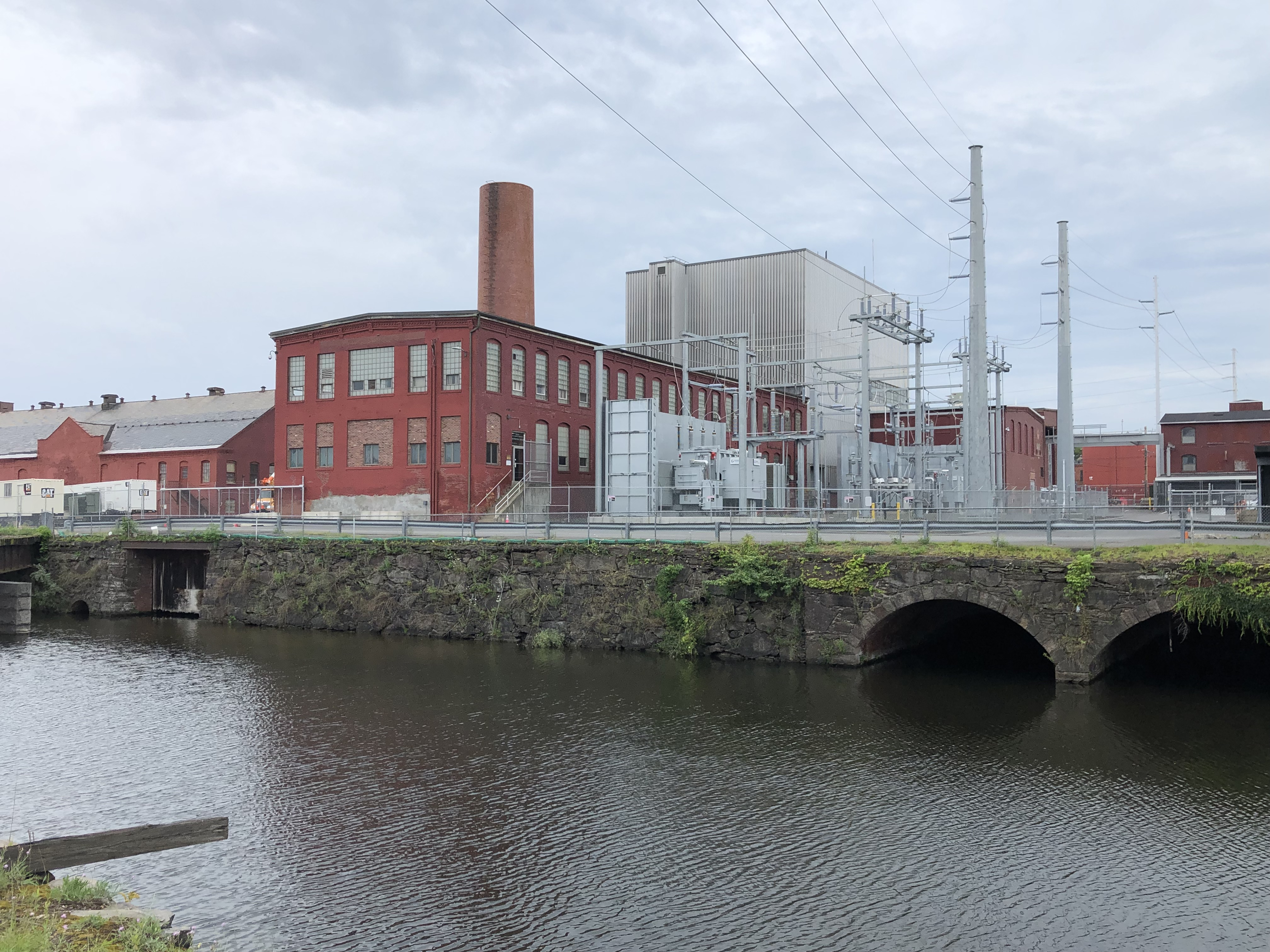
The former testing flume facilities, now an electrical substation for Holyoke Gas & Electric

The Holyoke Testing Flume ultimately revolutionized the development of water turbines in the United States, and from the 1880s until the 1920s was prominent in that industry as a standard test for American manufacturers. Its tests would be cited in superior court cases in the United States as the standard by which turbine wheel efficiencies were measured, into the early 20th century. The Testing Flume and its experiments would also be responsible for the improvement of the efficiency and cost-reduction of Francis turbines under James B. Emerson, as well as the development and testing of the first modern mixed-flow turbine, the Hercules, by John B. McCormick. It was also at the Testing Flume that James B. Francis developed his weir formula for measuring the efficiency of turbines, however this formula, though widely used in America, was a point of contention between American and European engineers, with differences of efficiency readings found between the Holyoke flume and counterparts in Germany. Such a standard measurement of flow efficiencies also enabled factories and governments to use the power measurements of turbines to determine, to a degree, the amount of leakage in flumes and dams across the United States.

The scaling up of electricity generation to much greater horsepower demands made the apparatus and its components obsolete, as even the most minor fluctuations in output had greater consequences in output measurements. However, ultimately the apparatus would play a key role in the invention of the Venturi meter, the first accurate means of measuring large-scale flows, and indirectly was part of the technological progression which led to the development of the combustion turbine and jet engines.

In recent years Holyoke Gas & Electric has sought to capitalize on this testing legacy. In 2018 it was announced that local Framingham based turbine designer PDI, Inc., had received a grant to manufacture a new turbine wheel type with the city's Cofab Engineering firm, testing said prototype in one of the Canal locks as part of HG&E's Clean Energy Test Bed Initiative.

Although the flume itself and its mechanical components were defunct by 1932, since the 1950s the Holyoke Gas & Electric Company has maintained its original building as an electrical substation, serving the city's ratepayers with hydropower and other renewably-sourced electricity.

=== Successors ===
As late as 1910 the laboratory was described as the only one of its kind used to test the efficiency of water turbines but, by 1930, it was one of at least 63 hydraulic laboratories in the United States, several of which had modern facilities. Despite eventual obsolescence of this type of flume, it would inspire a number of successors, including brief discussion in Congress of a proposed federal hydraulic laboratory.

Today the oldest hydraulic laboratory in the United States, the Alden Research Laboratory, continues to operate in Holden, Massachusetts. The laboratory's namesake, George I. Alden, would develop a novel dynamometer, the Alden dynamometer, which was tested extensively at the Flume. In addition to contemporary research, the laboratory is home to one of the pioneering Venturi meters, exhibited at the World's Columbian Exposition.

== See also ==
- Holyoke Heritage State Park
