= Holyoke Gas & Electric =

American public utility in Massachusetts

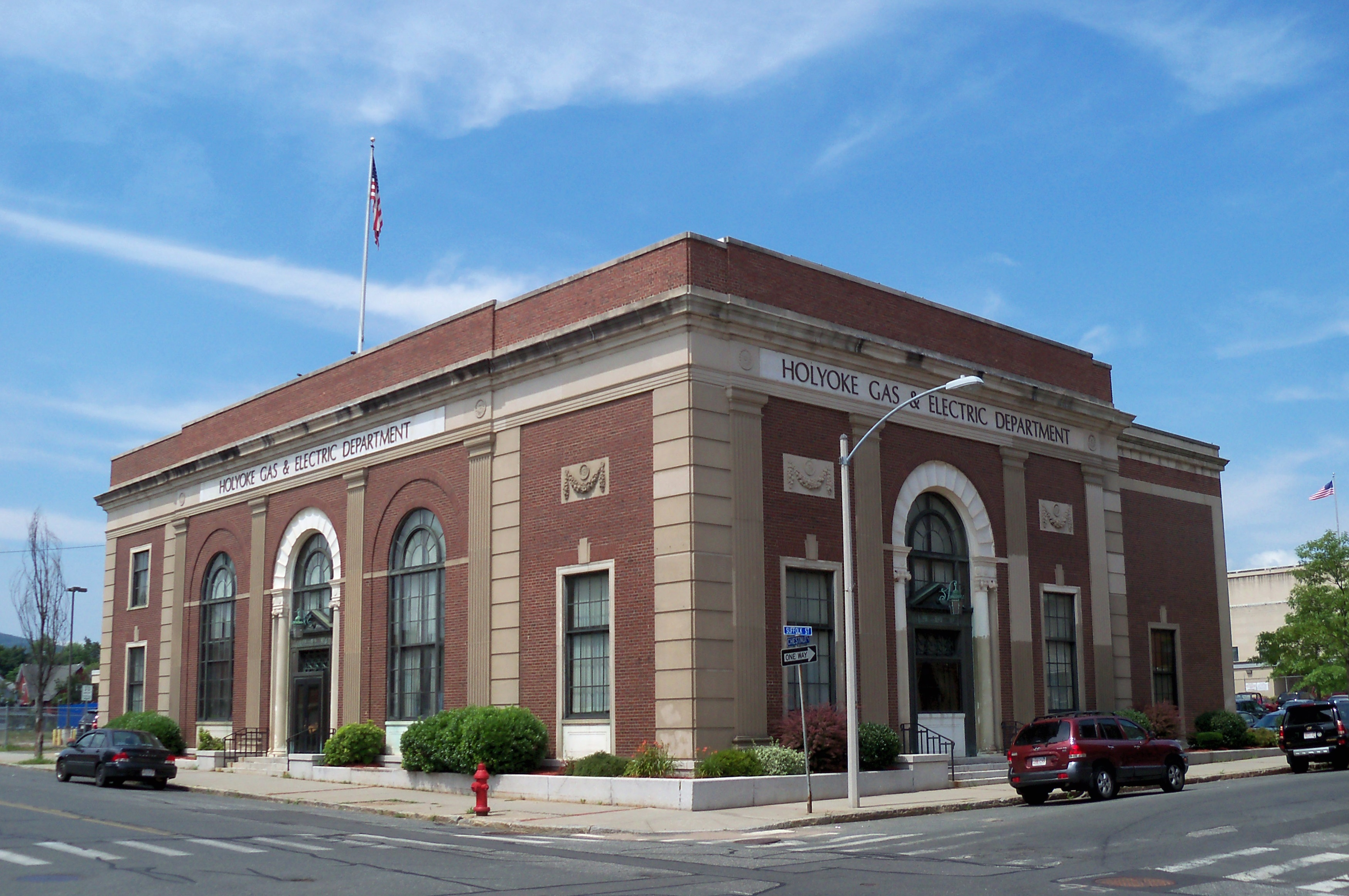
- HG&E headquarters in the former Holyoke National Bank building
- Trade name: HG&E
- Type: Municipal corporation
- Industry: Energy, telecommunication
- Predecessors: Holyoke Water Power Company
- Founded: December 15, 1902; 123 years ago
- Headquarters: 99 Suffolk Street, Holyoke, MA 01040
- Area served: Holyoke, Massachusetts, Southampton, Massachusetts, Leverett, Massachusetts (Note: Oversees maintenance and network operation for fiber to the home internet service only)
- Key people: Francis J. Hoey III (chairman); James A. Sutter (treasurer); Marcos Marrero (secretary); James M. Lavelle (general manager)
- Products: Electricity, natural gas, fiber communications services, public services billing
- Revenue: ▲$84.9 million USD (2022)
- Total assets: ▼$292.4 million USD (2022)
- Total equity: ▼$117.9 million USD (2022)
- Owner: City of Holyoke
- Website: hged.com

Holyoke Gas & Electric (HG&E), formally known as the City of Holyoke Gas & Electric Department (HGED), is a municipal electric, gas, and telecommunications utility primarily serving Holyoke and Southampton, Massachusetts, one of two in Massachusetts which provide all three services. (Note: Westfield Gas & Electric (WG&E) also provides all three services, as well as residential telecom.) Founded in 1902 with the purchase of gas and electric plants from the Holyoke Water Power Company, the municipal corporation launched its first fiber optics communications services in 1997. On December 14, 2001 the City of Holyoke purchased the majority of the remaining assets and operations of the Holyoke Water Power Company from Northeast Utilities and as a result the municipal utility assumed control of the Holyoke Dam and Canal System and an electric distribution system serving industrial electric customers in the flats neighborhood. The utility discontinued district steam service to conserve energy used in aging infrastructure in September 2010. Using hydroelectric power generation in tandem with a series of solar panel facilities, the utility has among the lowest rates in the Commonwealth, and as of 2016 between 85% and 90% of the city's energy output was carbon neutral, with administrative goals in place to reach 100% in the next decade.

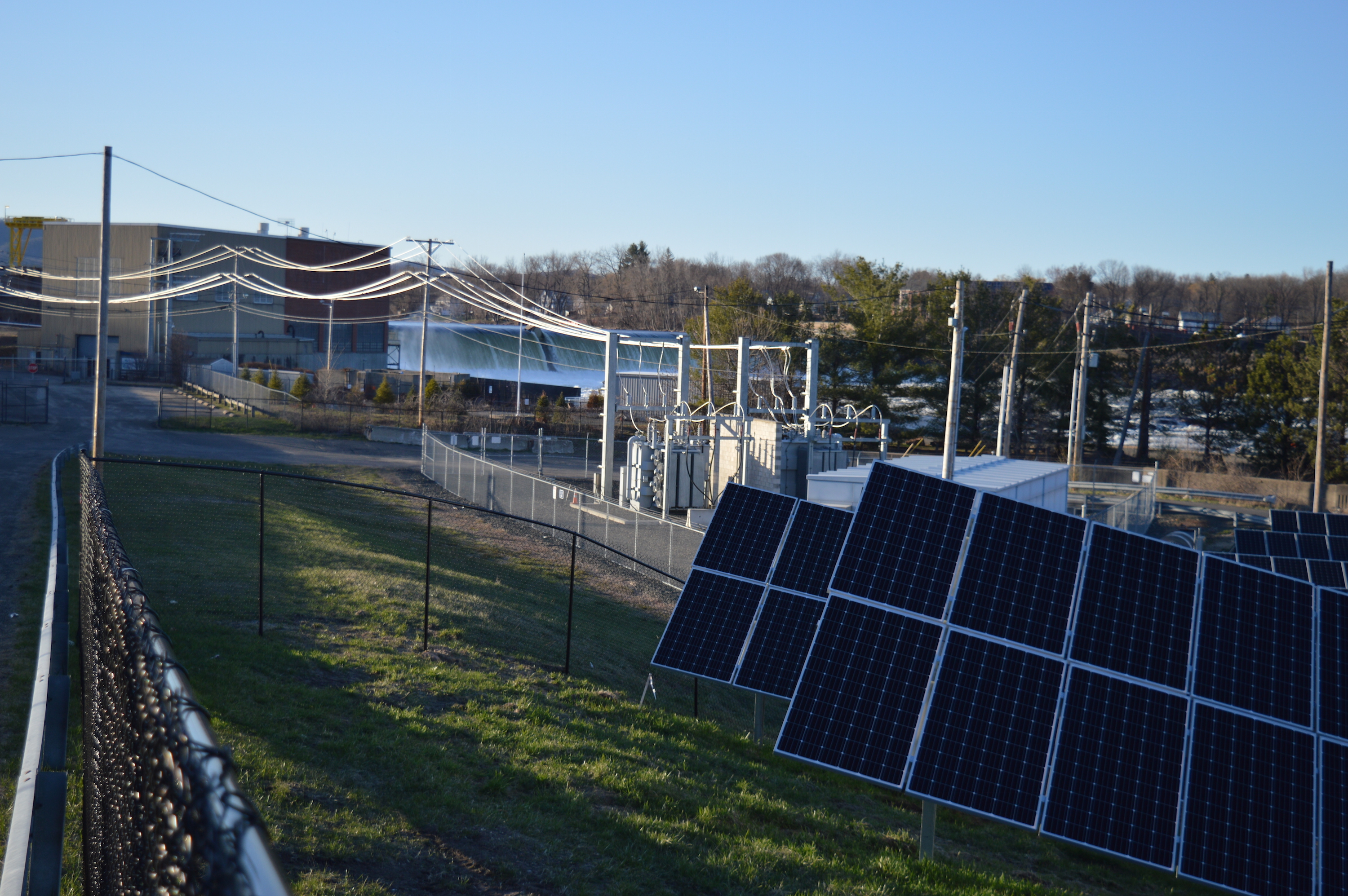
Examples of HG&E's renewables portfolio, a solar panel installation adjacent to the Holyoke Dam

In 2010, the utility worked with affiliate institutions Boston University, Harvard, MIT, Northeastern, and UMass to set up special infrastructure to power and connect the Massachusetts Green High Performance Computing Center to a point of presence and the Internet2 network. On November 6, 2019, city voters passed a nonbinding question calling for a feasibility study and cost estimate of a gradual rollout of residential fiber internet service. In 2022, HG&E procured a full network design for a fiber-to-the-home rollout, with plans to continue cost estimation in subsequent years. Among its other initiatives the municipal utility worked with French multinational Engie in 2018 to create the largest energy storage facility in Massachusetts, reducing the need for peaking units and allowing more economical distribution of its portfolio of renewable hydroelectric and solar despite variations in generation and demand.
