= Inspirator =

An inspirator is a device, similar to a venturi tube and an orifice plate, which mixes a fuel gas with atmospheric air in a precise ratio to regulate burn characteristics. Only the pressure of the fuel gas is used to draw in and mix the air. They are the most simple and common type of mixing device for gas stoves and furnaces. Burners using an inspirator are considered to be naturally aspirated.

In an inspirator there are two tubes. The first is a fuel gas pipe with an orifice at the end where the gas comes out. Then in front of this there is another section of tubing with a larger diameter that the gas blows into. Usually (but not always) this second piece of tubing is tapered so that it starts getting narrower downstream from the orifice. Then, at a certain point, it stops getting narrower and either straightens out or starts getting larger again. This gives the fuel and air time to mix. The fuel/air ratio is determined by the ratio of the diameter of the orifice to the diameter of the mixing tube.

The US Government Technological Paper no. 193 describes "inspirators" as "Injecting tubes" when used for "injecting" air into the gas stream for pre-mixing the air and fuel for domestic and industrial gas burners. The experimental evidence provides an optimised "venturi" for developing the low-pressure zone to suck-in the maximum amount of air for a particular gas supply from a jet. The Venturi CSA is optimally 43% of the Burner CSA, and positions and lengths of tubes are described in the document. The "optimum" expansion beyond the venturi is at 2 degrees taper (4 degrees included angle). This design of "Inspirator" can be seen in many domestic and industrial gas burners in use today.
