= Holyoke Canal System =

Historic power canals in Holyoke, Massachusetts, US

Coordinates: 42.2086°N 72.6002°W

- U.S. National Register of Historic Places
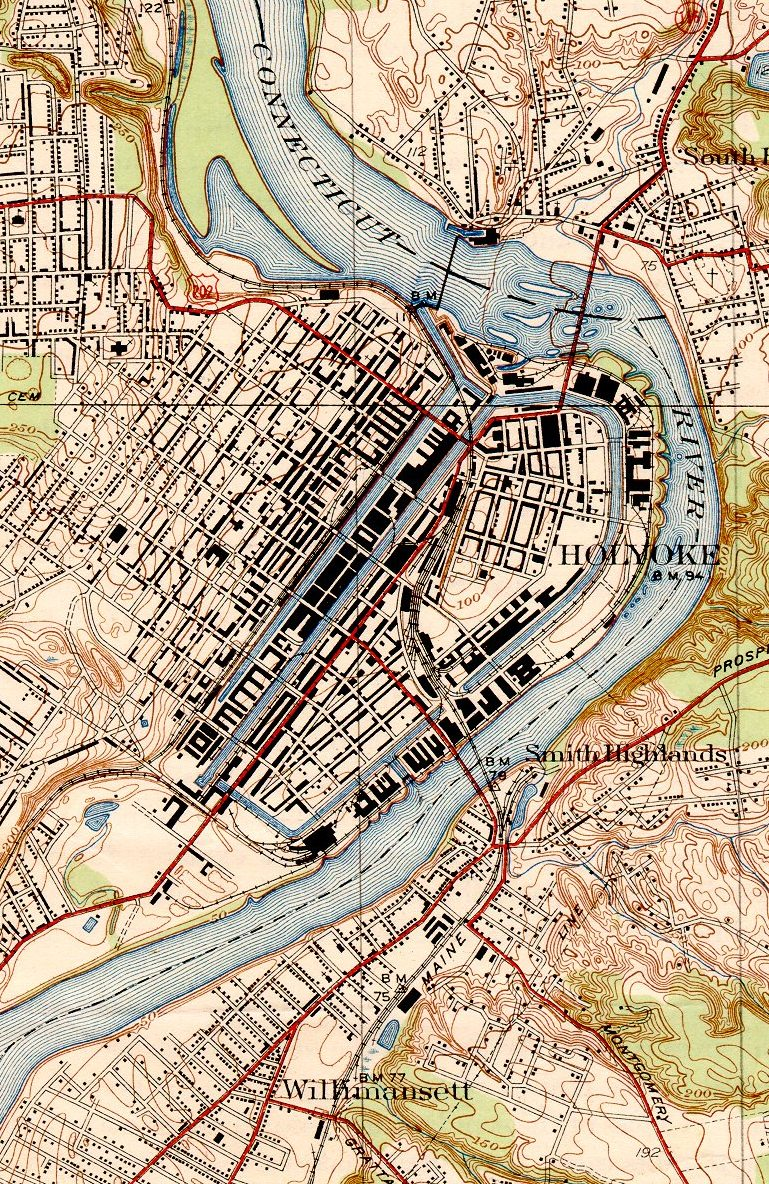
- Holyoke Canal System
- Location: Holyoke, Massachusetts
- Built: 1847
- Architect: Philander Anderson, C.E.
- NRHP reference No.: 80000473
- Added to NRHP: December 3, 1980

The Holyoke Canal System is a system of power canals in Holyoke, Massachusetts. It is split into three canals based on elevation and distance from the inlet at the Holyoke Dam- the First Level Canal, Second Level Canal, and Third Level Canal. Constructed over a period between 1847 and 1892, the Canal System, along with the Dam, is recognized as a Historic Mechanical Engineering Landmark by the American Society of Mechanical Engineers for its use in the development of the Venturi meter by Clemens Herschel, the first means of measuring large-scale flows, and the McCormick-Holyoke Turbine by John B. McCormick, which doubled the efficiency of turbines to more than 80% in its time.

== History ==
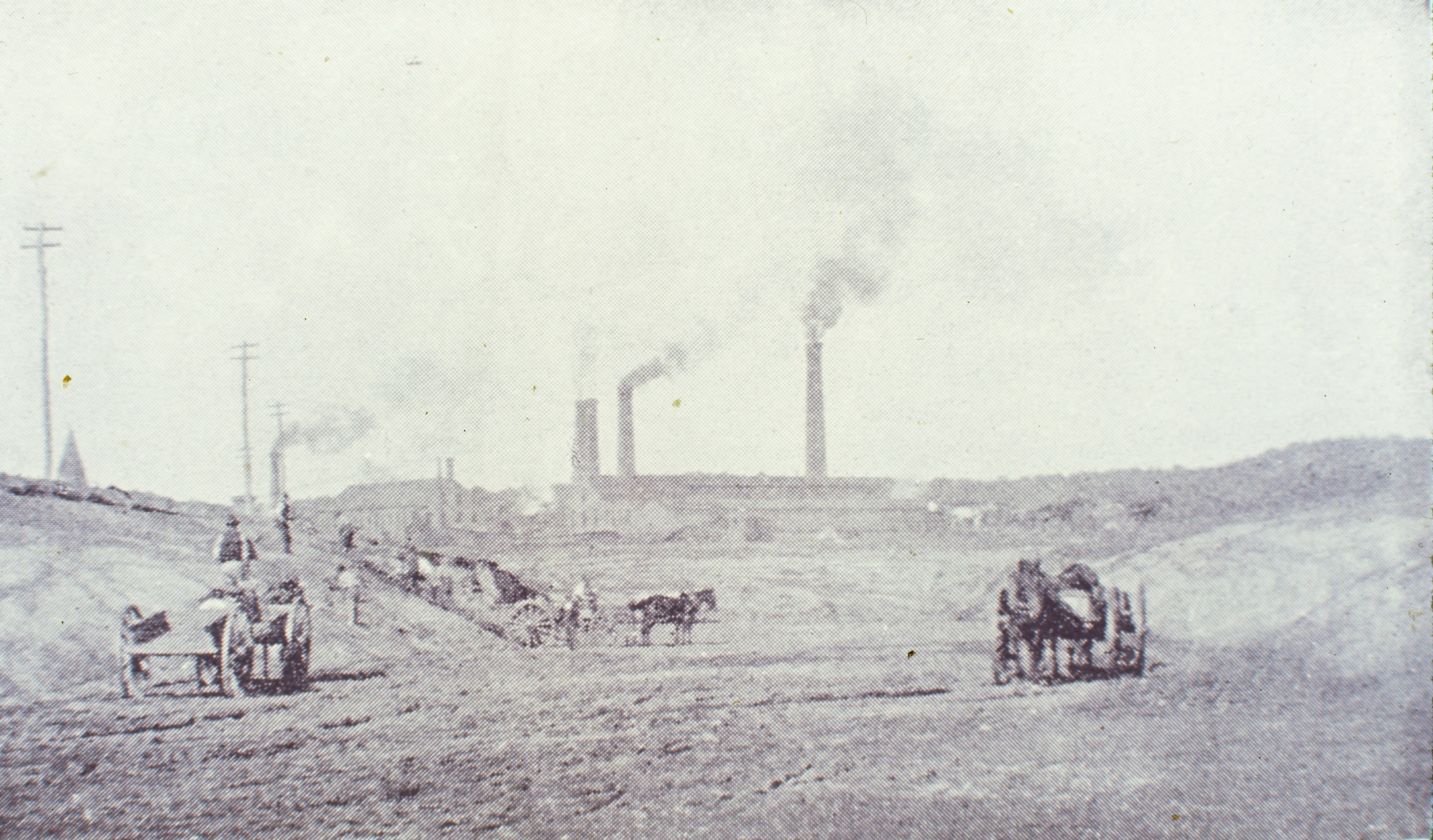
Horse-drawn carriages removing earth during the original construction of the canal system, c. 1855.

The earliest predecessor to Holyoke's canals dates to 1827, when the Hadley Falls Company was established to manufacture cotton cloth. Its water-powered looms were fed from a wing dam along the Connecticut River's Great Rapids.

Today's canals began in 1848, after river measurements indicated an available water power of 6,000 cubic feet per second (170 m^{3}/s), the equivalent of 30,000 horsepower (22,000 kW), or enough to power 450 mills. That year the company was reconstituted, with a capital stock of $4,000,000, to create a new manufacturing center based on local river power. Over the next 10 years it would build the area's dam and canal system, lay out industrial, commercial, and residential areas on its 1,100 acres (445 ha) of land, and construct and operate two cotton mills and a factory making textile machinery.

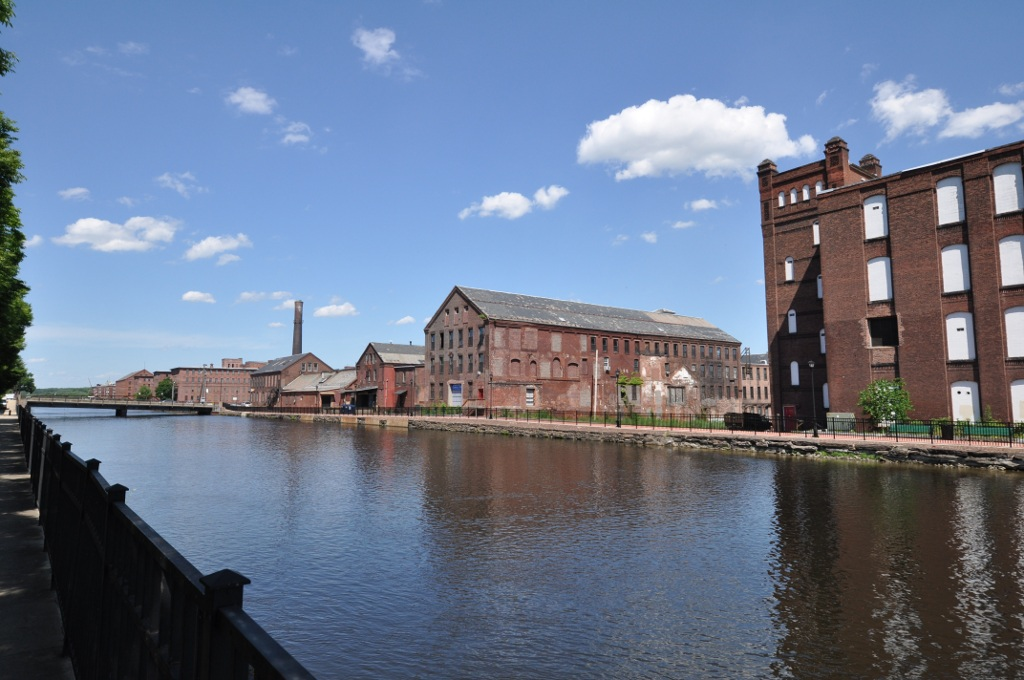
The First Level Canal, as seen from Holyoke Heritage State Park

In 1848 the first timber crib dam, about 1,000 feet (300 m) in length, was constructed across the Connecticut River to divert water into the canals. It failed within hours, and was replaced by a second timber dam, which in turn was replaced in 1900 by a granite-faced dam about 150 feet (46 m) downstream from its predecessor. The early canals were dug by men with picks and shovels, together with horse-drawn teams. Canal construction continued on and off until 1892.

In 1859, after the company had failed and had passed into receivership, Alfred Smith purchased at auction its hydraulic system, consisting of the dam, its gate houses, and 2.5 miles (4.0 km) of power canals with a boat lock; some 1,100 acres (445 ha) of land in Holyoke containing mills and other buildings; and the public water supply reservoir and gas plant, each with a distribution system. He formed the Holyoke Water Power Company and sold stock to investors. Over the next 30 years the company flourished, as a number of large mills were built in the area. Energy was transmitted from the waterwheels to mills via a distribution system of gears, shafts, pulleys, and belts. The canals first produced municipal electricity on October 14, 1884, from an electric generator connected to a water wheel–driven shafting in an industrial building. In 1888 this was replaced by a combination hydro and steam electric power plant on the First Level Canal.

Today the canal system is owned by the City of Holyoke and operated by its municipal Gas and Electric Department which bought out the assets of Holyoke Water Power in December 2001. As early as 1995, plans were proposed to create a "canal walk" as part of a "necklace park plan." Styled after the Emerald Necklace, this proposal called for linking Olmsted-designed parks to the Canal District, parks already along the canal, and the historical downtown. By 2015, the Massachusetts Department of Transportation completed a new phase of sidewalk construction alongside the canals, opening the Canal Walk that linked the downtown to the then-new Holyoke station. The canals are drained twice every year, in the spring and fall, to allow for maintenance.

== Description ==
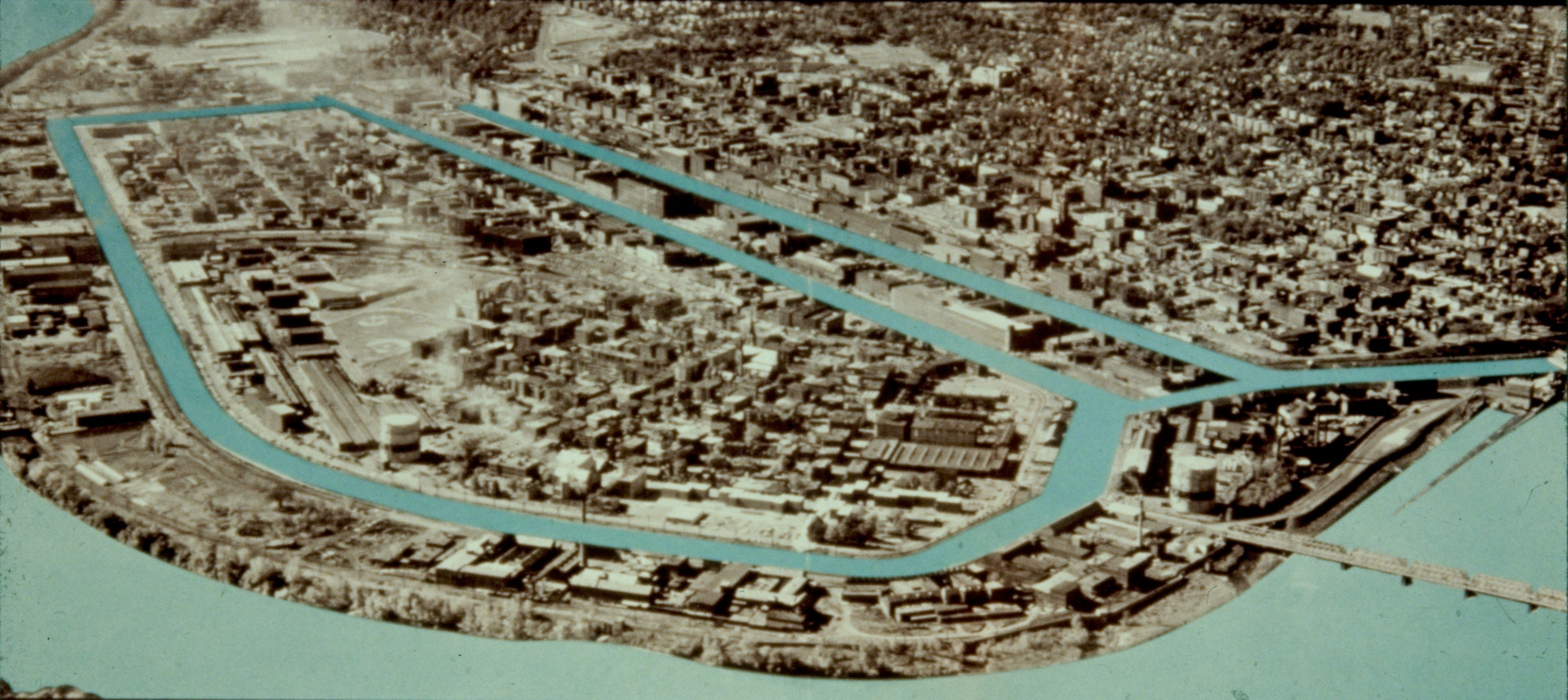
An aerial view of Downtown Holyoke and The Flats with the Canal System and Connecticut River highlighted

Today's canal system is 4.5 miles (7.2 km) in length on three levels. The canals are now used for electrical power generation as the water descends level by level to the river.

The First Level Canal contains 12 large gates regulating water coming into the system, each 15 feet (5 m) long by 9 feet (3 m) wide, and weighing more than four tons, and two smaller gates at 11 feet (3 m) by 4.5 feet (1.4 m), all powered by a water wheel. At its origin the canal is 140 feet (43 m) wide with 22 feet (6.7 m) of water depth. It extends eastward about a thousand feet and then sweeps south for more than one mile (1.6 km) to supply the upper tier of mills.

The Second Level Canal runs parallel to the First but about 400 feet (120 m) east. It begins at its south end, and runs north for over a mile. For its first 2,000 feet (600 m), it is 140 feet (43 m) wide, then gradually narrows to 100 feet (30 m). Its average water depth is 15 feet (5 m).

The Third Level Canal begins at the south end of the Second Level, but some 12 feet (4 m) lower, and extends 3,550 feet (1,082 m). It is about 100 feet (30 m) wide and 10 feet (3 m) deep, with an average height above the river varying between 23–28 feet (7–9 m).

=== Bridges ===
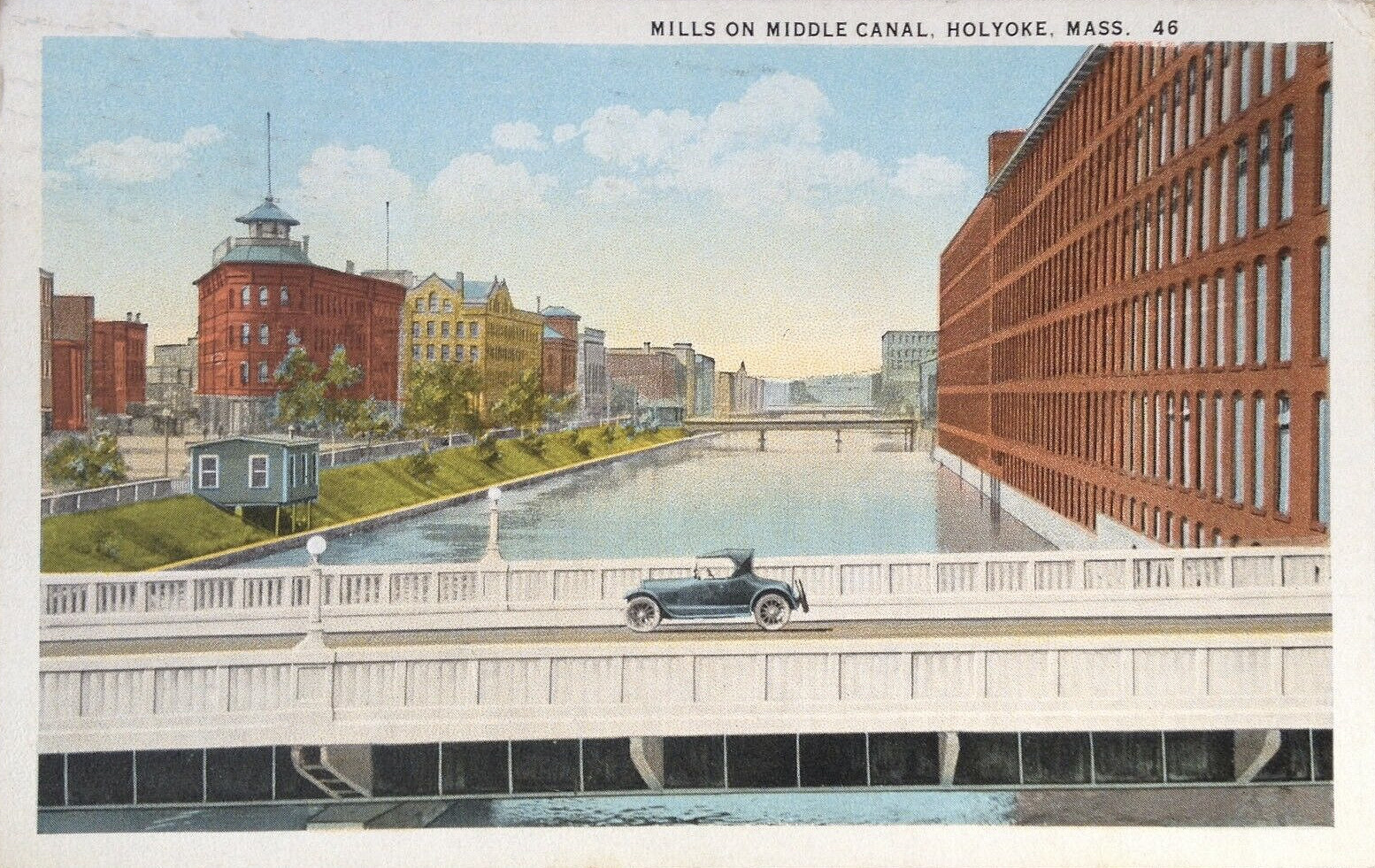
Girder bridges in a common style in the early 20th century; other examples remain extant without lighting today.

Throughout the three canals there are 28 bridges carrying cars, pedestrians, and parts of the former Holyoke & Westfield Railroad, today operated by the Pioneer Valley Railroad. Of these, in total 21 remain operable. Five single lane bridges, all on the Third Canal, are closed, with one similar remaining in operation at Gatehouse Road. The oldest bridge in the system is the stone deck arch bridge, built in 1894, at the intersections of Cabot and Canal Street. Five rail bridges remain operable, including three trusses, along with one defunct deck bridge and another converted into a pedestrian bridge for the Canal Walk. At least two pedestrian bridges, one by Hadley Thread Mill and another by Holyoke Die Cut Card remain closed; another one pedestrian bridge at the corner of Oliver St was demolished in the latter half of the 20th century.

== Gallery ==
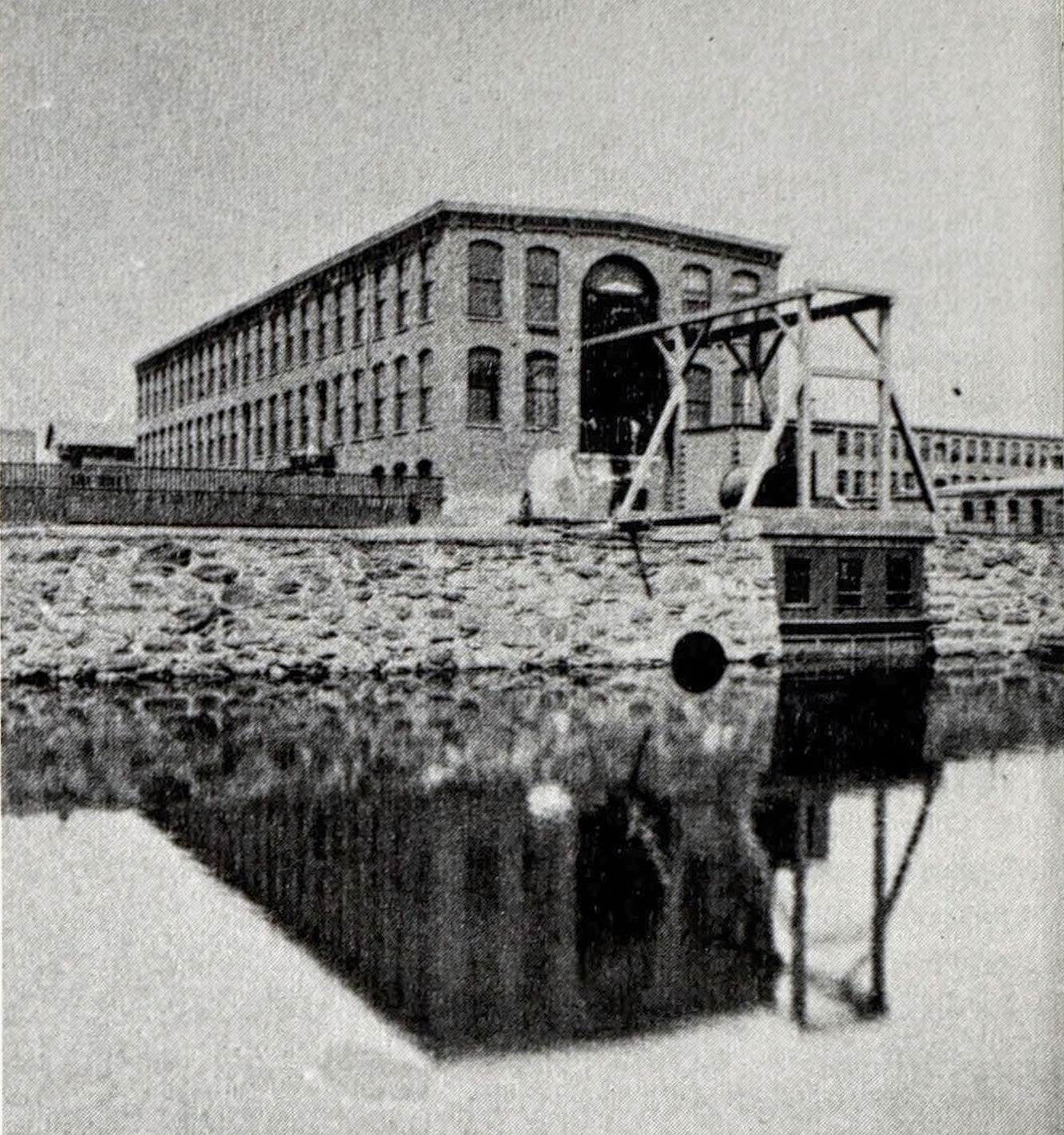
The Holyoke Testing Flume as it appeared in 1895; designed by Clemens Herschel, this facility would lead to the development of the McCormick-Holyoke Turbine

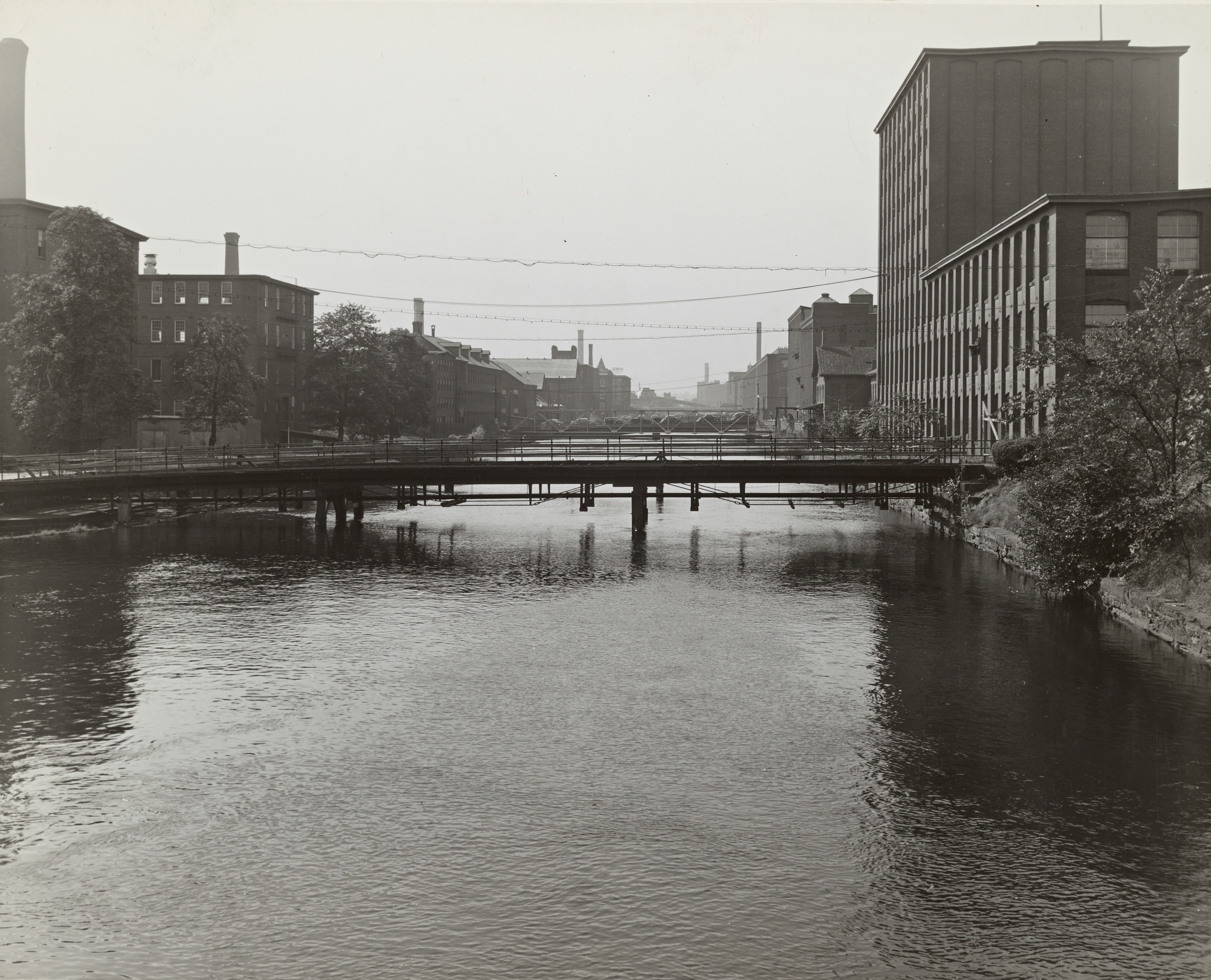
Paper mills line the canals, as they appeared looking south from Lyman Street, 1941

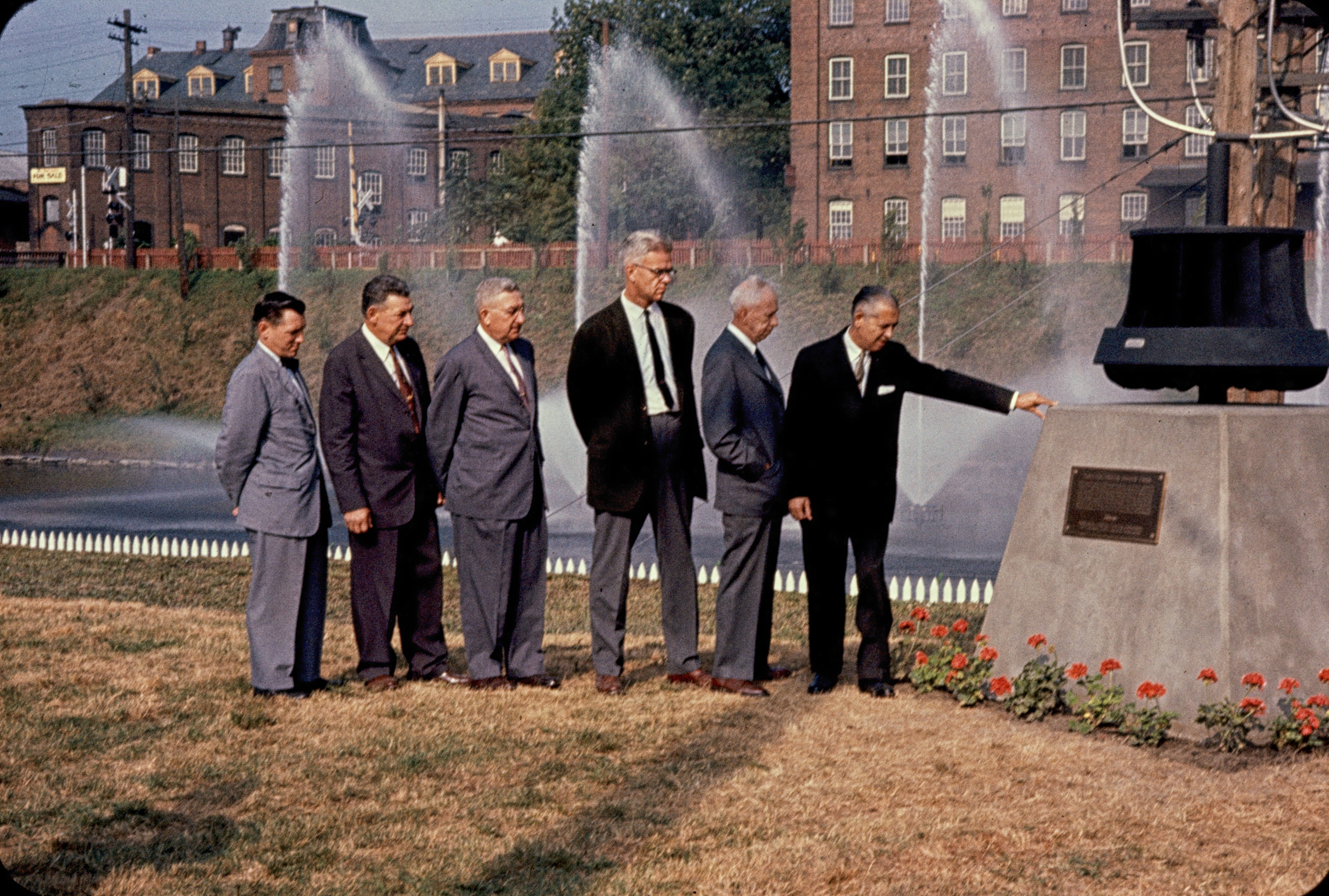
Roger E. Barrett Jr. (ctr), William Skinner II (2nd right), and Mayor Samuel Resnic (right) dedicate Holyoke Water Power Park with employees of the Holyoke Water Power Company, 1960

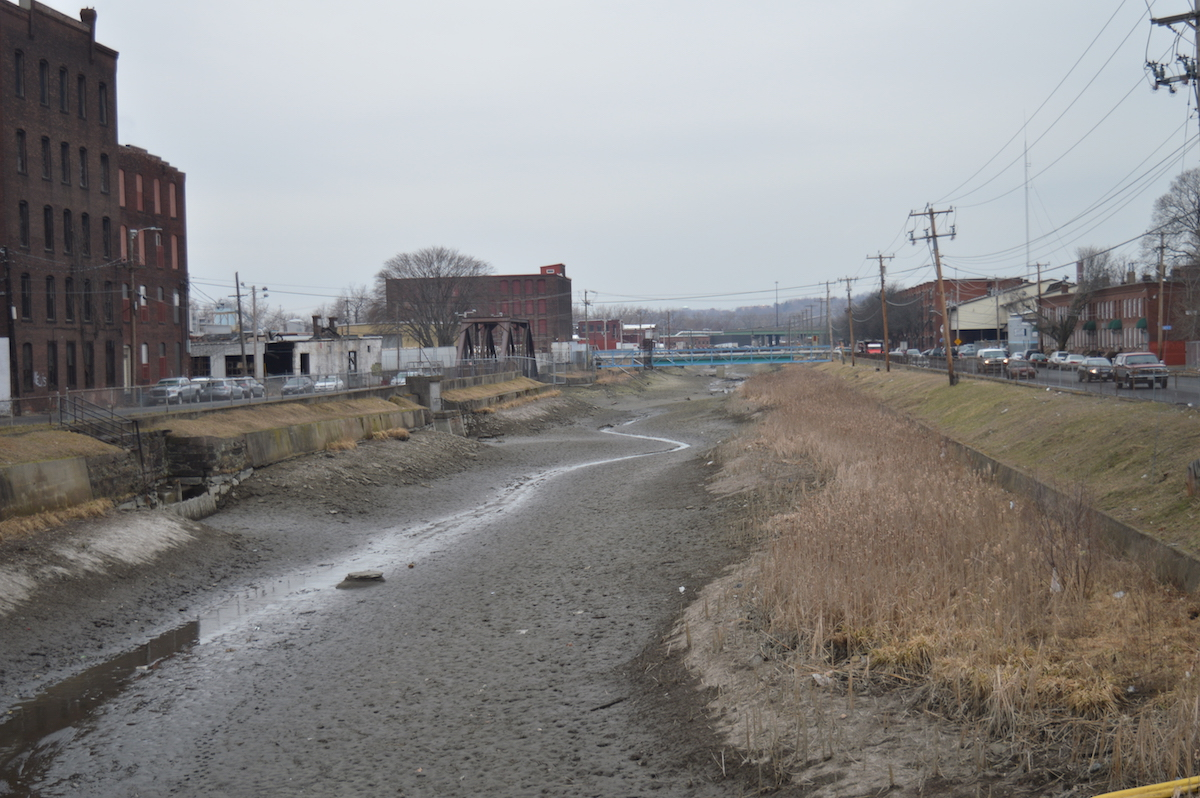
The Third Level Canal, drained for routine dredging and maintenance, March 2018

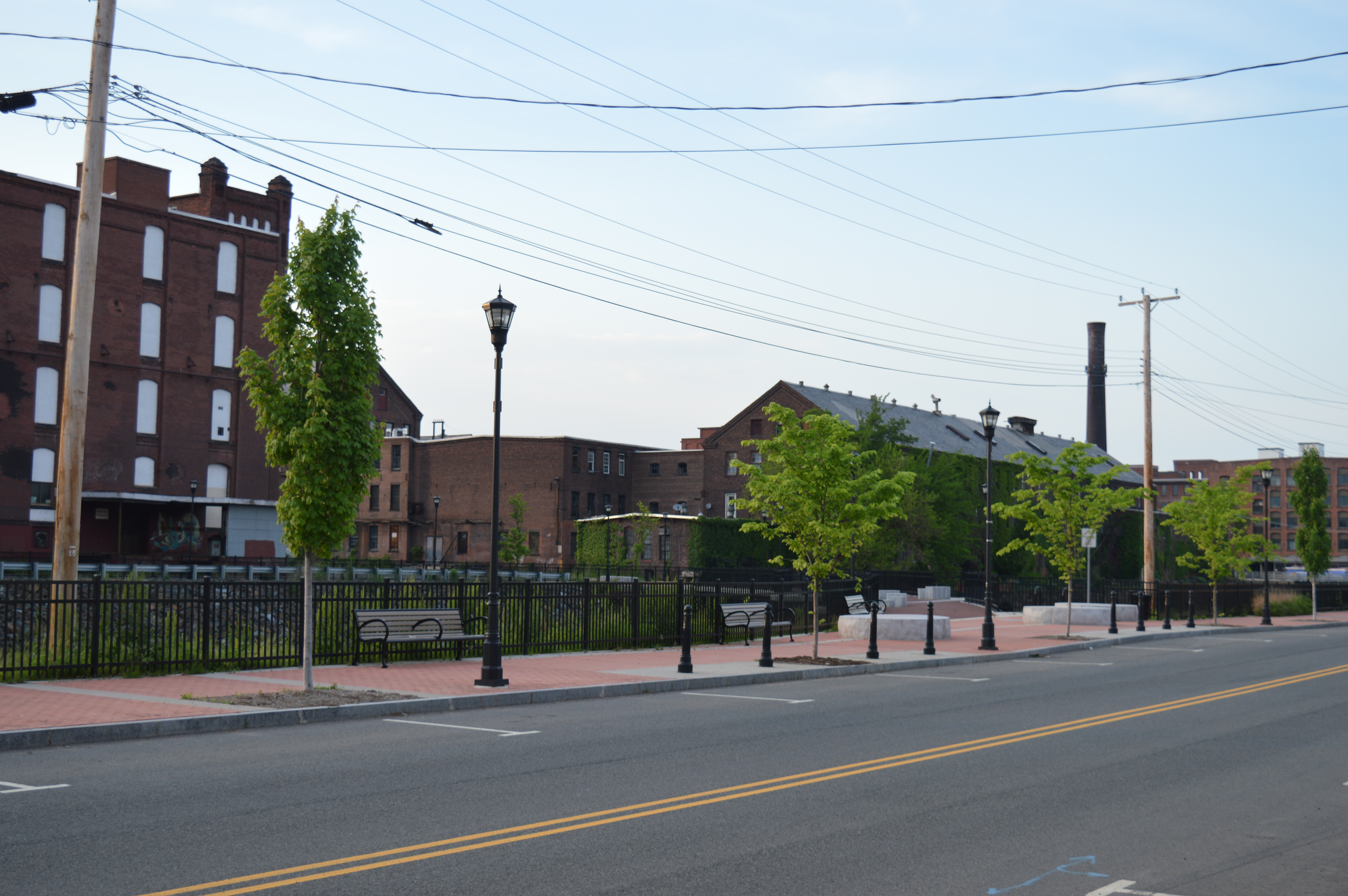
The Holyoke Canal Walk, May 2018

== See also ==
- South Hadley Canal
- National Register of Historic Places listings in Hampden County, Massachusetts
