= Clemens Herschel =

American hydraulic engineer, inventor of the Venturi meter

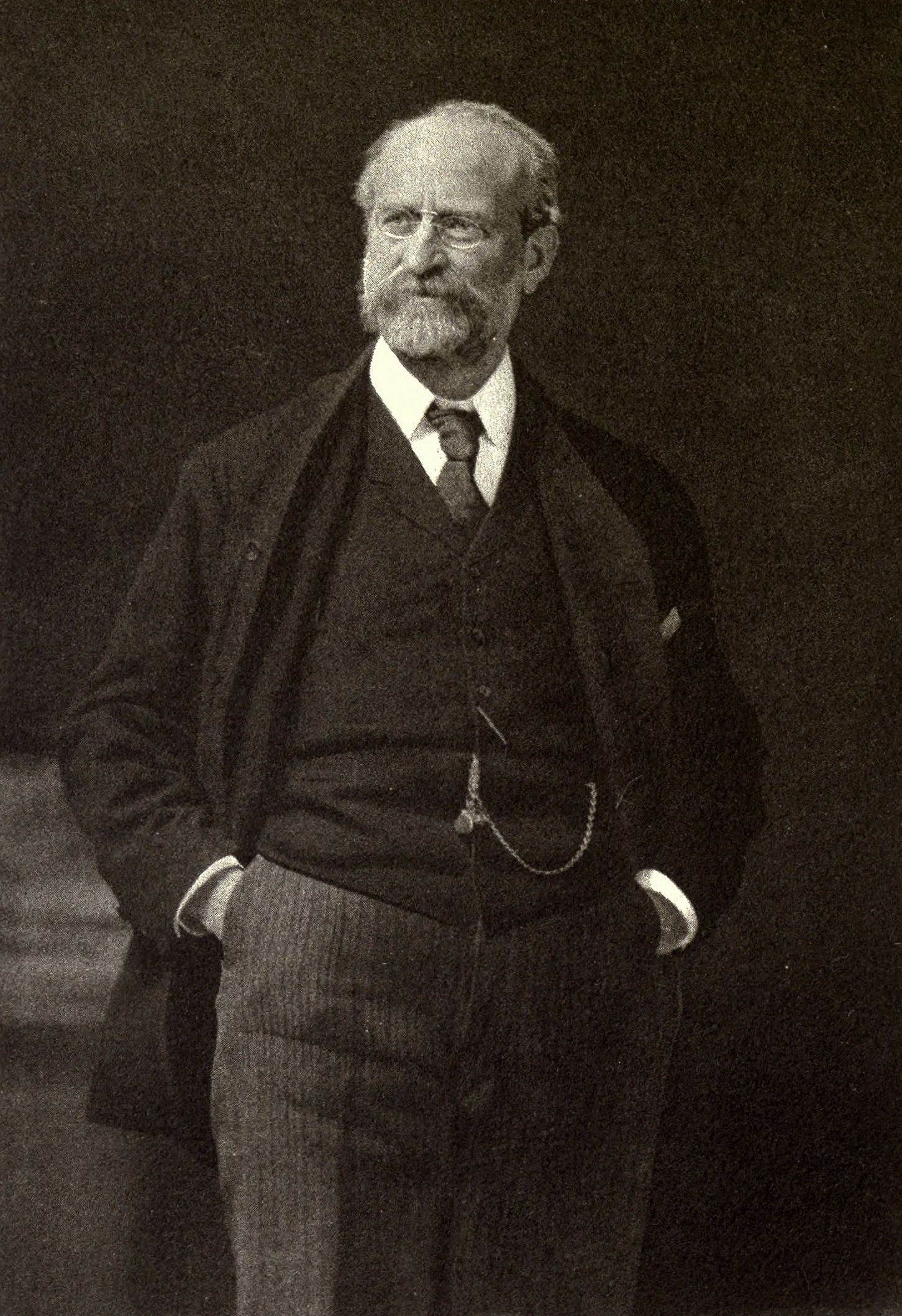
- Born: March 23, 1842; Vienna, Austria
- Died: March 1, 1930 (aged 87); Glen Ridge, New Jersey, US
- Education: BS, Harvard University, 1860
- Occupations: Consulting hydraulic engineer and superintendent of the East Jersey Water Company
- Known for: Measurement of water flow and development of the Venturi meter
- Awards: Water Industry Hall of Fame, American Water Works Association, 1971; Elliott Cresson Medal from the Franklin Institute, 1889.

Clemens Herschel (March 23, 1842 – March 1, 1930) was an American hydraulic engineer. His career extended from about 1860 to 1930, and he is best known for inventing the Venturi meter, which was the first large-scale, accurate device for measuring water flow. He developed this device while serving as director of the Holyoke Testing Flume, a turbine testing facility which he would redesign, which became the first modern hydraulics laboratory in the United States and the world.

== Early life and education ==
Clemens was born in Vienna on March 23, 1842. His family immigrated to Davenport, Iowa, in 1850. He spent most of his life practicing his profession in Massachusetts, New York and New Jersey. He attended Harvard University, where he received his bachelor of science degree in 1860 from the Lawrence Scientific School. After Harvard, he completed post-graduate studies in France and Germany.

== Career ==
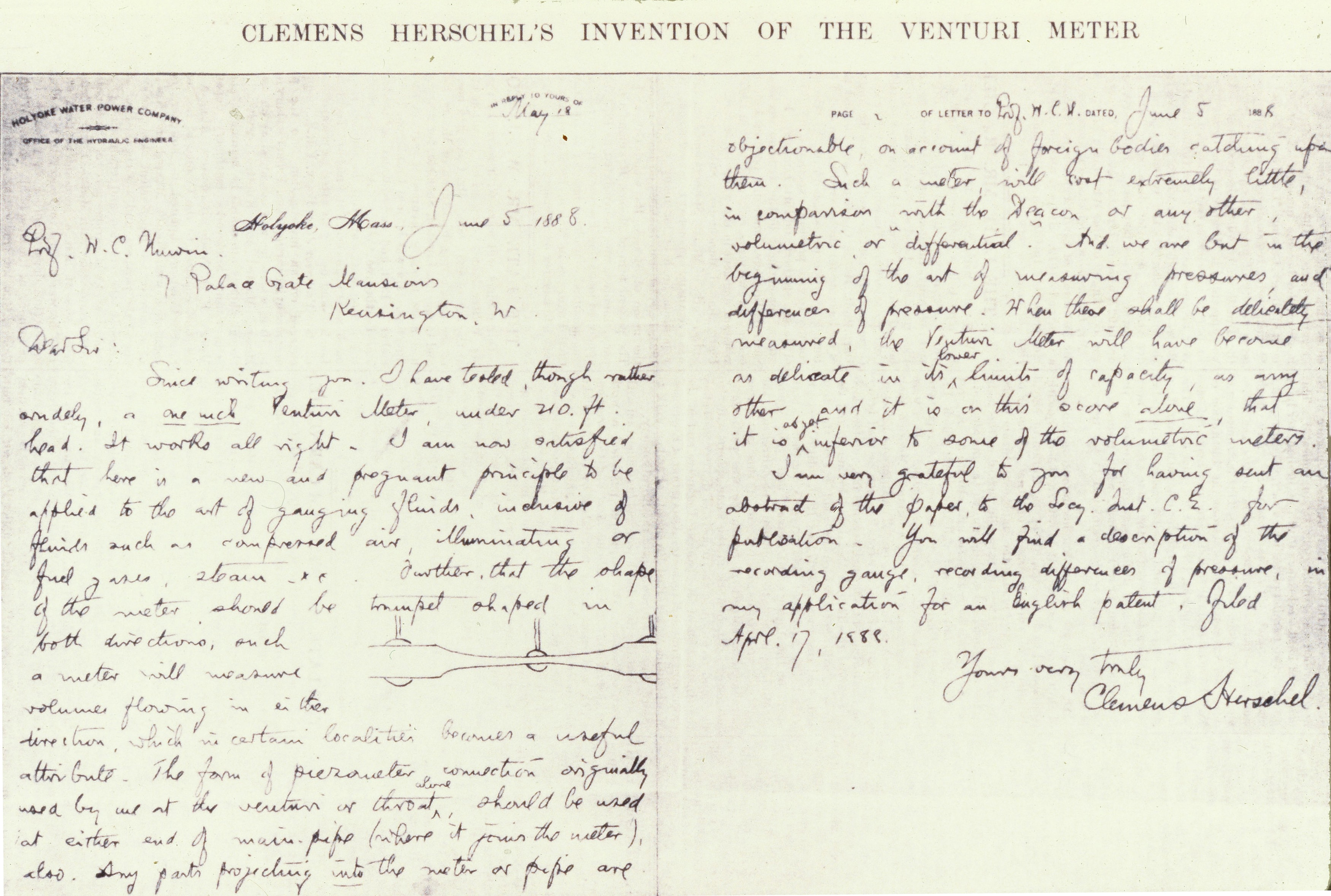
A letter from Herschel to William Unwin on June 5, 1888, describing his invention of the Venturi meter while working at the Holyoke Water Power Company

The first part of Herschel's career was devoted to bridge design, including the design of cast-iron bridges. For a time, he was employed on the sewerage system of Boston. Herschel was influenced by James B. Francis, who was the agent and engineer of the Proprietors of Locks and Canals on the Merrimack River at Lowell, Massachusetts, to switch his career path to hydraulic engineering. About 1880, he started working for the Holyoke Water Power Company in Massachusetts. He remained with the company until 1889. While he was there, Herschel designed the Holyoke Testing Flume, which has been said to mark the beginning of the scientific design of water-power wheels. Herschel first tested his Venturi meter concept in 1886 while working for the company, and by 1888 felt he had perfected it conceptually, ultimately naming it in honor of Giovanni Battista Venturi, the eminent Italian physicist who first described the differential pressure phenomenon in a 1797 treatise. The original purpose of the Venturi meter was to measure the amount of water used by the individual water mills in the Holyoke area.

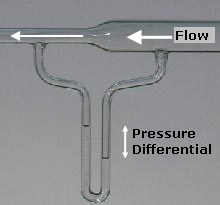
A flow of air through a venturi meter, showing the columns connected in a U-shape (a manometer) and partially filled with water. The meter is "read" as a differential pressure head in cm or inches of water.

Water supply development in northern New Jersey was an active area of investment in the late 19th century. In 1889, Herschel was hired as the manager and superintendent of the East Jersey Water Company, where he worked until 1900. He was responsible for the development of the Pequannock River water supply for Newark. He also installed two of his largest Venturi meters at Little Falls, New Jersey, on the main stem of the Rockaway River to serve Paterson, Clifton and Jersey City.

After 1900 and lasting until the end of his life, Herschel was a consulting hydraulic engineer with offices in New York City. He worked on some of the major water development projects in the world. He played a major part in the construction of the hydroelectric power plant at Niagara Falls, which was the first large-scale electric power plant. He was appointed to an expert committee that reviewed the plans for the first water tunnel that would deliver water from the Catskill reservoirs to New York City.

== Personal life ==
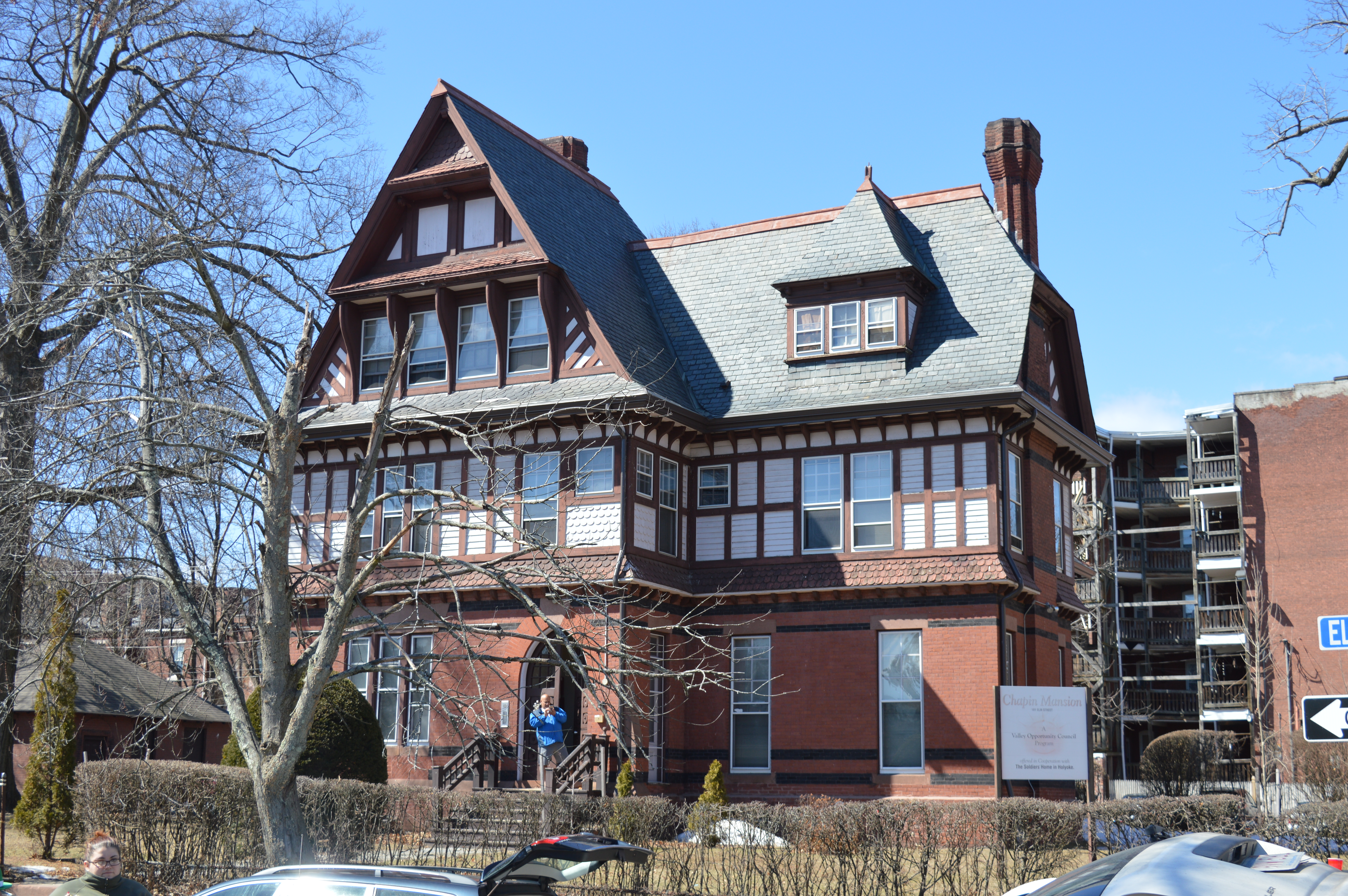
Chapin Mansion, where Herschel resided during his early years with the Holyoke Water Power Company

Herschel's first wife, Grace Hobart, died in 1898. They had three children, Arthur, Winslow and Clementine. Herschel married Jeannette Begg Hunter of Thompsonville, Connecticut, on March 5, 1910. They had one son, Clemens Herschel Jr.

== Professional associations ==
Herschel was active in several professional organizations including the American Water Works Association and the New England Water Works Association. He was a member of the Institution of Civil Engineers in London, and he was elected president of the American Society of Civil Engineers in 1916.

== Honors and awards ==
Herschel was one of the first five inductees into the American Water Works Association Water Industry Hall of Fame. He was also made an honorary member of that organization. Herschel was awarded the Elliott Cresson medal in 1889 by the Franklin Institute for his development of the Venturi water meter.

In 1888, Herschel was presented with the Thomas Fitch Rowland Prize by the American Society of Civil Engineers. The Rowland Prize is awarded to an author whose paper describes in detail accomplished works of construction or which are valuable contributions to construction management and construction engineering. He was made an Honorary Member of ASCE in 1922.

The Clemens Herschel Prize was established at Harvard University in 1929. The award is given to meritorious students in practical hydraulics. Each year, the Boston Society of Civil Engineers Section presents the Clemens Herschel Award to authors "…who have published papers that have been useful, commendable, and worthy of grateful acknowledgment."

== Publications ==
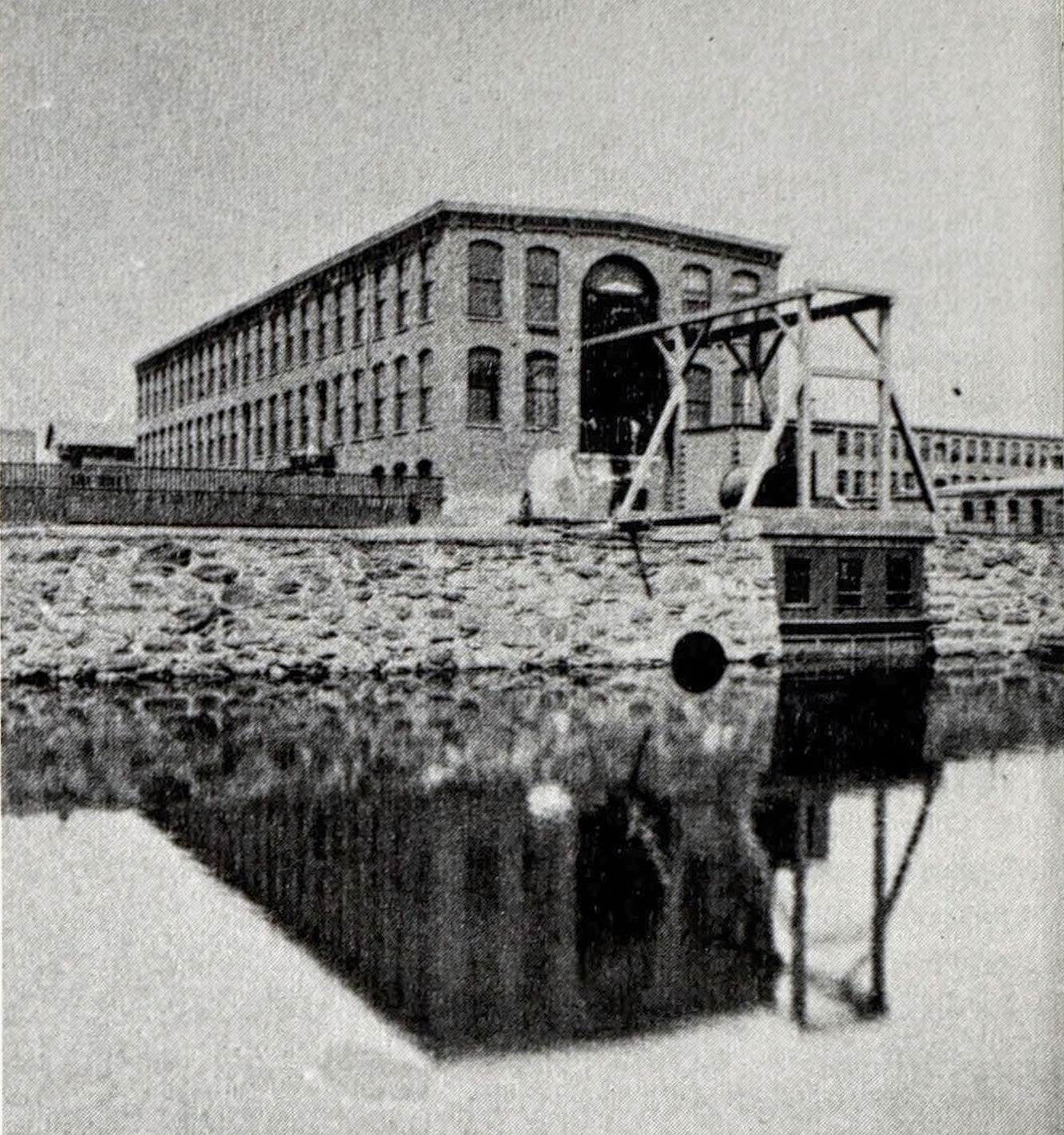
The Holyoke Testing Flume; designed by Herschel, it fostered the creation of new turbine technologies, including the Holyoke-Hercules/McCormick Turbine

Perhaps Herschel's most well-known publication was not a strictly technical book. While traveling in Italy in 1898, he was allowed to make a photographic copy of a manuscript of de Aquaeductu Urbis Romae by Sextus Julius Frontinus, who had been chief administrator of the water supply system of ancient Rome. He translated the work into English and titled it Frontinus and the Water Supply of the City of Rome. Other more recent translations have been done by scholars and Latin specialists, but Herschel's book brought the challenges and successes of the water commissioner for Rome to the notice of water professionals.

Some of his other publications include:

- Herschel, Clemens (1897) 115 Experiments on the Carrying Capacity of Large, Riveted, Metal Conduits, up to Six Feet per Second of Velocity of Flow New York:Wiley
- Herschel, Clemens (1898) Measuring Water Providence, RI:Builders Iron Foundry
- Herschel, Clemens (1899) The Venturi Water Meter Reprinted from Cassier's Magazine
- Herschel, Clemens (1893). "The Works of the East Jersey Water Company, for the Supply of Newark, New Jersey". Journal of the New England Water Works Association. 8: 19–39.
- Herschel, Clemens (1926). "Water Supply and Main Drainage Districts". Journal AWWA. 16 (5): 531–541. Bibcode:1926JAWWA..16e.531H. doi:10.1002/j.1551-8833.1926.tb12570.x.
