= Montgomery Knight =

- Knight, c. 1934
- Born: February 22, 1901; Holyoke, Massachusetts
- Died: July 25, 1943 (aged 42)
- Education: Massachusetts Institute of Technology
- Scientific career
- Fields: Aeronautical engineering
- Workplaces: Massachusetts Institute of Technology National Advisory Committee for Aeronautics; Georgia Institute of Technology Georgia Tech Research Institute
- Academic advisors: Edward P. Warner

Montgomery Knight (February 22, 1901 – July 25, 1943) was an aeronautical engineer who specialized in rotary-wing aircraft. He was the first director of the Guggenheim School of Aeronautics at the Georgia Institute of Technology and a founder of and long-time researcher at the Georgia Tech Research Institute.

== Education and early career ==
Knight was born on February 22, 1901, in Holyoke, Massachusetts to Franklin and Gertrude Knight and graduated from Holyoke High School in 1918. He attended the Massachusetts Institute of Technology (MIT) under advisor Edward P. Warner, graduating in 1922 with a Bachelor of Science in electrical engineering. Knight did graduate work at Johns Hopkins University and Harvard University and taught courses at MIT. He may have briefly worked for Westinghouse, given that there are two patents for electrical equipment under his name.

He joined the National Advisory Committee for Aeronautics (NACA) at Langley Field in 1925, and in 1927 served as NACA's director of the Atmospheric Wind Tunnel Section.

== Georgia Tech ==
Georgia Tech president Marion L. Brittain worked to establish an aeronautics program at that institute; classes were offered as early as 1926 and in 1927, in a visit paid for by the Guggenheim Foundation for the Promotion of Aeronautics, Charles Lindbergh visited Georgia Tech and flew the Spirit of St. Louis over Grant Field. In particular, Brittain sought to secure the funds for a chair in aeronautics at Georgia Tech. The fund had awarded grants to several other schools, but none in the southern United States. It was considering another award and 27 universities competed for it, most notably the University of Alabama and Georgia Tech. In particular, the foundation liked Georgia Tech's history with the Army Air Corps but was hesitant due to the lack of financial support typically received by universities in Georgia.

Due in part to Brittain's faculty hires, most notably Montgomery Knight, the Guggenheim Foundation gave its largest and last ever grant, $300,000 (equivalent to $5,781,900 in 2025) which allowed Brittain to establish the Daniel Guggenheim School of Aeronautics. About $100,000 of that was used to fund the Guggenheim Building, and $50,000 was used to purchase equipment and fund a wind tunnel; the wind tunnel was designed by Knight and patterned after the wind tunnel at GALCIT. Knight had developed one of the first jet-powered rotors for a helicopter. In the 1930s he created a full-scale version of the rotor and tested it.

In 1929, some Georgia Tech faculty members belonging to Sigma Xi started a research club that met once a month at Tech. One of the monthly subjects, proposed by ceramic engineering professor W. Harry Vaughan, was a collection of issues related to Tech, such as library development, and the development of a state engineering station. Such a station would theoretically assist local businesses with engineering problems via Georgia Tech's established faculty and resources. This group investigated the forty existing engineering experiments at universities around the country, and the report was compiled by Harold Bunger, Knight, and Vaughan in December 1929. The station was created as the Engineering Experiment Station (EES) in 1934 under Vaughan, and changed names in 1984 to the Georgia Tech Research Institute. Knight served on EES's advisory board and would perform a significant amount of research there.

== World War II ==
In the early 1940s, Georgia Tech was one of thirteen schools that were part of a New Deal National Youth Administration / Army Air Corps war preparation program to double the number of pilots in training. Montgomery Knight was in charge of Georgia Tech's participation; 90 additional students enrolled in the program that year. Knight was also involved in some of the only early wartime-related research at Georgia Tech in 1941, focusing on helicopters. The war would vastly accelerate the amount of research performed at Georgia Tech, particularly for the aeronautics faculty: in particular, research was performed on the "autogyro" designed by Knight; and the school's air tunnel was used ten to twelve hours a day under contract by a variety of aircraft companies.

On February 15, 1942, The Atlanta Constitution ran an article predicting the atomic bomb; Knight's comments in the article were based on his knowledge of Uranium-235. Shortly after the article was published, FBI agents "[descended] upon the campus ... and closeted themselves with Knight for a long session in his office".

== Death and legacy ==
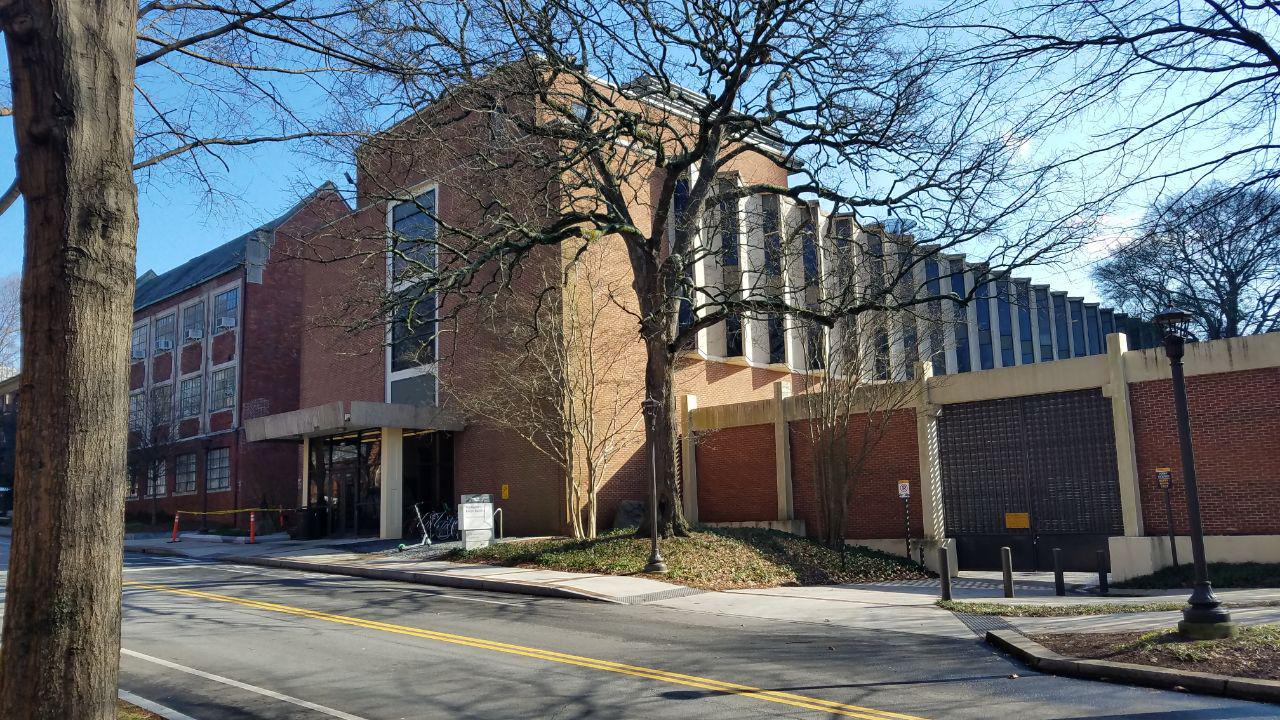
Montgomery Knight Building, Georgia Tech

Montgomery Knight held the position of director of Georgia Tech's School of Aeronautics until his death on July 25, 1943.

In 1968, a $1,716,000 (equivalent to $15,887,400 in 2025) building with 55,600 square feet of floor area was dedicated to the Montgomery Knight Building. The school's research (generally conducted in partnership with the Engineering Experiment Station) continued to focus on Knight's area of interest, rotary-wing aircraft; Georgia Tech received national recognition for this research in 1970.

== Works cited ==
- McMath, Robert C.; Ronald H. Bayor; James E. Brittain; Lawrence Foster; et al. (1985). Engineering the New South: Georgia Tech 1885–1985. Athens, Georgia: University of Georgia Press. ISBN 0-8203-0784-X.
