= Rex Records (1957) =

- Founded: 1957 (69 years ago)
- Founder: Joe and Wanda Chesky; Larry Chesky
- Status: Inactive, dissolved 1990
- Genre: Polka, folk (Celtic, Polish, Volksmusik), choral
- Country of origin: United States
- Location: Holyoke, Massachusetts

Rex Records, sometimes identified by its record series Rex Heritage, was an independent record label based in Holyoke, Massachusetts. It was founded by Joe and Wanda Chesky who marketed it as "the king of polkas" releasing a substantial catalog of polka bands primarily from the New England area, as well as the Great Lakes states. Their artists included Bob Uguccioni, Wesoly Bolek, Fred Gregorich & the Del Fi's, Big Ted Nowak, Big Steve & the Bellaires, Walt Cieslik, Happy, Louie, Walt Solek, Jimmy Sturr, Al Soyka, and their son, Larry Chesky, who became largely identified with the label. While primarily a producer of LPs, the label also produced some 45 singles, as well as cassettes and 8-tracks. In its earliest years, the label appeared as a subsidiary of Al Solka's "Glo Records" of Somers, Connecticut, and for two decades was based out of 3 Granville Street, expanding into a larger space at 34 Martin Street in 1972. Rex Records remained active in some capacity into the late 1980s, releasing a limited set of 100 cassettes recording the music rolls of the Holyoke Merry-Go-Round organ in 1988, during the fundraising effort which saved it—Chesky himself having been a fixture at Mountain Park for decades.

== Genres and artists ==
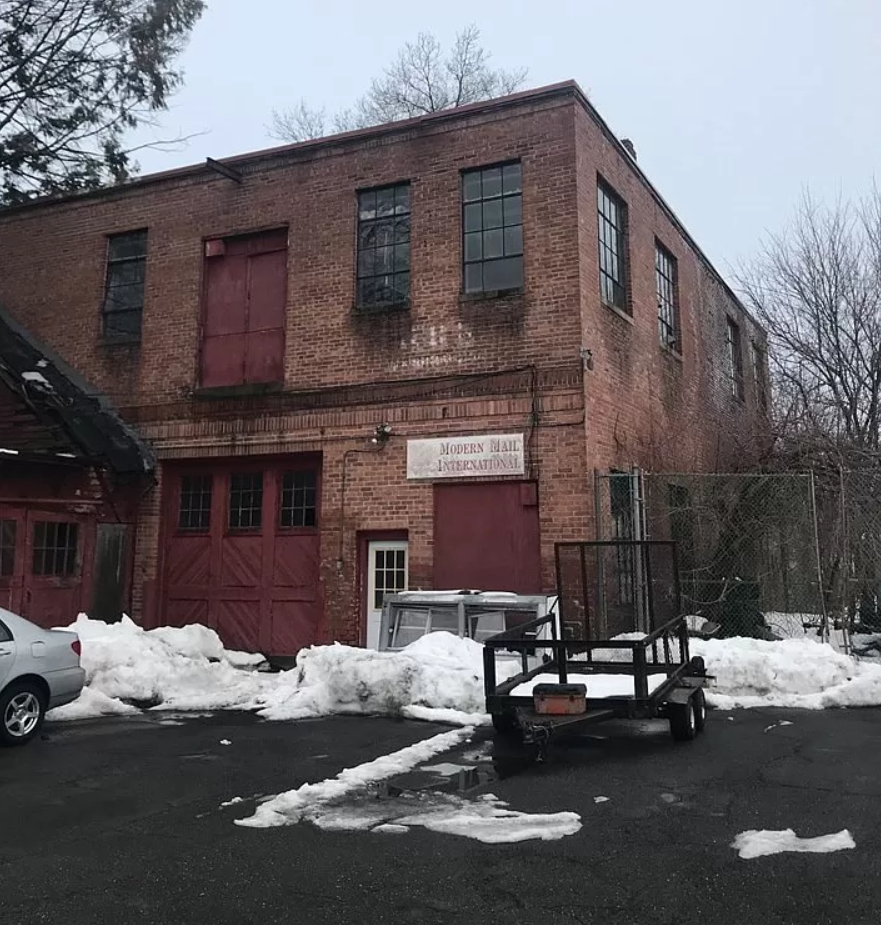
The former headquarters of Rex Records, as well as Chesky's other business, Modern Mail International

While the label was primarily dedicated to polka, especially big band polka, the label would also expand to include pressings Irish traditional music in the 1970s, producing more than a dozen such albums under the heading "Rex Heritage Disc", including several from the Emerald Isle as well as local Holyoke Irish artists. Notably the label produced the debut solo album of Irish accordionist James Keane and the American debut album of rebel music band The Barleycorn.

=== Polka ===
- Wesoły Bolek
- Larry Chesky and His Orchestra
- Walt Cieslik And The Musical Ambassadors
- Al "Cocoa" Czelusniak
- Fred Gregorich And The "Del Fi's"
- Regina Kujawa
- Happy Louie and Julcia's Polka Band
- Johnny Menko
- Ed Podolak & His Polka Cats
- Johnny Prytko
- The Rhythm Orchestra
- Bob Siwicki And His New Englanders Orchestra
- Walter Solek
- Al Soyka
- Jimmy Sturr
- Bob Szymanski Orchestra

=== Choirs ===
- The Lutnia Choir, Holy Mother of the Rosary Parish (Chicopee)
- Mater Dolorosa Choir
- St. Cecilia Choir, Our Lady of Czestochowa Parish
- The St. Joseph Choir of Webster, Massachusetts
- United Choirs Of New England

=== Irish folk ===
- The Barleycorn
- Butch & Maeve

- Butch Moore
- Maeve Mulvany

- The Dustmen
- Dermott Flynn & David Stone
- Chris Henshaw
- The Irish Tradition
- James Keane
- Dickie McManus and the Irish Revolution
- Michael Owens
- Chris Tabb And His Emerald Isle Orchestra

== See also ==
- List of record labels
- Rex Records (disambiguation)
