= Fingal (disambiguation) =

Fingal is a county in Ireland, formerly the northern part of the historical county of Dublin. Fingal may also refer to:

== Arts ==
- Fingal (hero), the eponymous hero of a poem in the Ossian cycle by James Macpherson
- Fingal (music group), Irish traditional music group

== Places ==
- Fingal, Tasmania, Australian town
- Fingal, Victoria, Australian town
- Fingal Head, New South Wales, Australian village, often referred to as Fingal
- Fingal, Ontario, community in Canada near a Royal Canadian Air Force station
- Fingal, North Dakota, U.S. town

== Sport ==
- Fingal county hurling team
- Sporting Fingal F.C., association football club in the Football League of Ireland

== Other uses ==
- Fingal mac Gofraid, late 11th century King of the Isles
- MV Fingal, former Northern Lighthouse Board ship converted into a boutique hotel, berthed in Edinburgh, Scotland
- SS Fingal, Norwegian merchant ship sunk off Australia in World War II

== See also ==
- Fingal Bay, New South Wales, near Port Stephens in Australia
- Fingal's Cave, sea-cave on Staffa in the Inner Hebrides of Scotland
- Fingall (disambiguation)
