= Mountain Park (Holyoke, Massachusetts) =

Defunct amusement park

Coordinates: 42°14′38.26″N 72°37′49.42″W

- Interactive map of Mountain Park
- Location: Holyoke, Massachusetts, United States
- Status: Defunct
- Opened: 1897 (amusement park); 2009 (music venue)
- Owner: Eric Suher
- Slogan: New England's Finest Amphitheater
- Website: iheg.com/mountain_park_main.asp (archived)

Mountain Park, located on Mount Tom in Holyoke, Massachusetts, was originally built as a trolley park by the Holyoke Street Railway Company. Trolley parks were built just outside populated areas to encourage trolley usage on weekends. The Holyoke Street Railway company created two attractions, Mountain Park toward the base of Mount Tom, and a large house on the summit of the mountain.

In 2009 it began operating as a large outdoor venue for concerts, under owner Eric Suher's Iron Horse Entertainment Group; as of Summer 2018, it remains defunct with no events scheduled for the foreseeable future.

== History ==
=== Beginnings ===
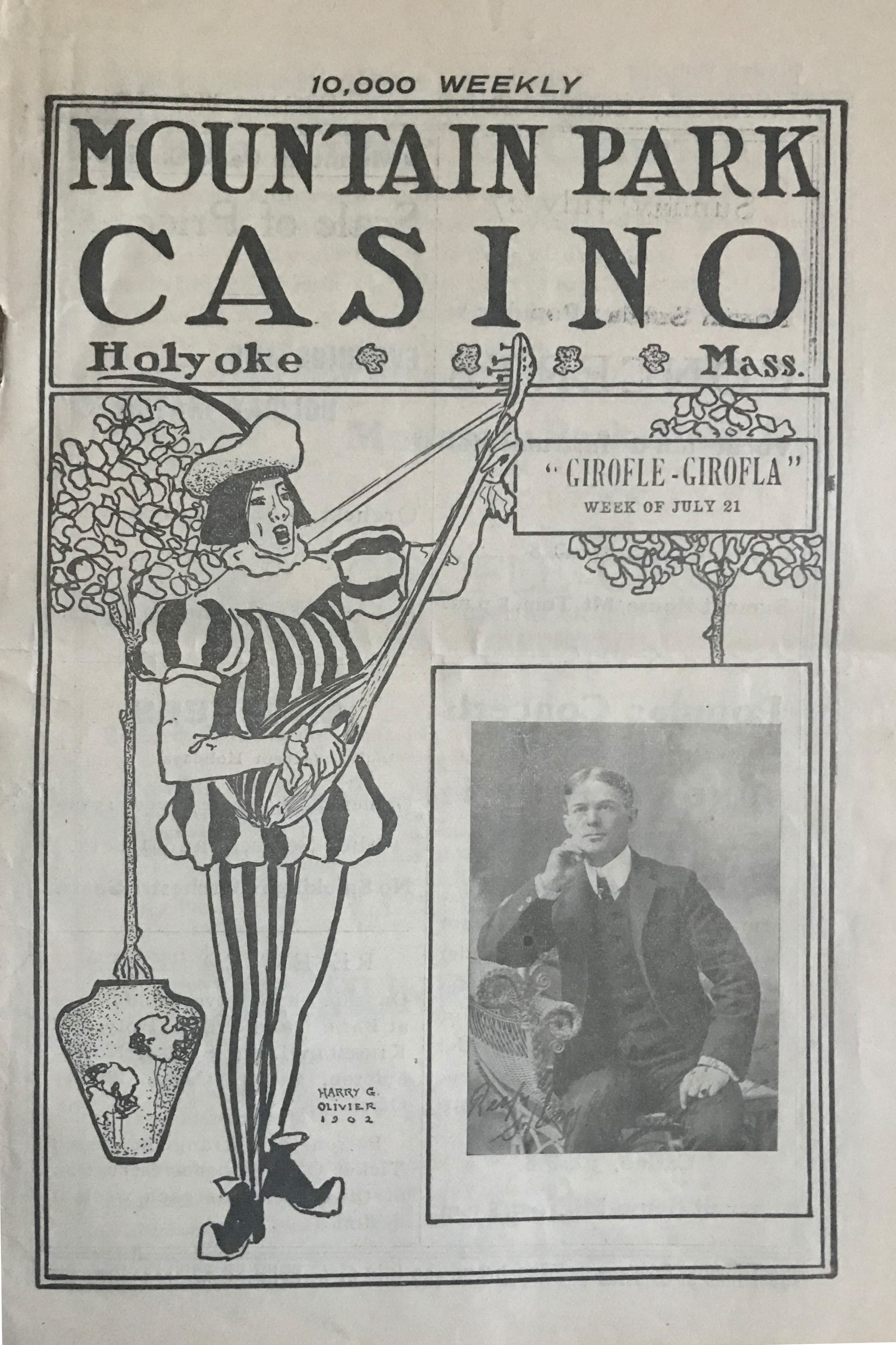
A playbill for a performance of French libretto Giroflé-Girofla at the Mountain Park Casino, July 21, 1902

In 1888, William Loomis, one of the Company's directors, took ownership of the Holyoke Street Railway Company. In the following years, he purchased 365 acres (1.5 km^{2}) of "cow pastures with scenery" on the side of Mount Tom. In 1894, Loomis constructed an open-air stage there, which attracted many patrons. The next year the trolley line was extended up to that point. In 1897, Loomis applied for and was granted a charter with the state for building a "pleasure resort." A dance hall, open air restaurant, switchback railway and merry-go-round were constructed. A unique cable railway was created to take visitors to a new building at the summit of the mountain. It was from this building President William McKinley stated that the view from Mount Tom was the most beautiful in the world.

A new enclosed theater was built, The Casino, with seating for 2,500 people. It mainly presented light opera. Loomis continued expanding the resort with his assistant, Louis Pellissier. One of the biggest attractions for the city folk was the collection of picnic groves and beautiful gardens. There were reflecting pools, arbors and even a small zoo featuring bear and deer cages.

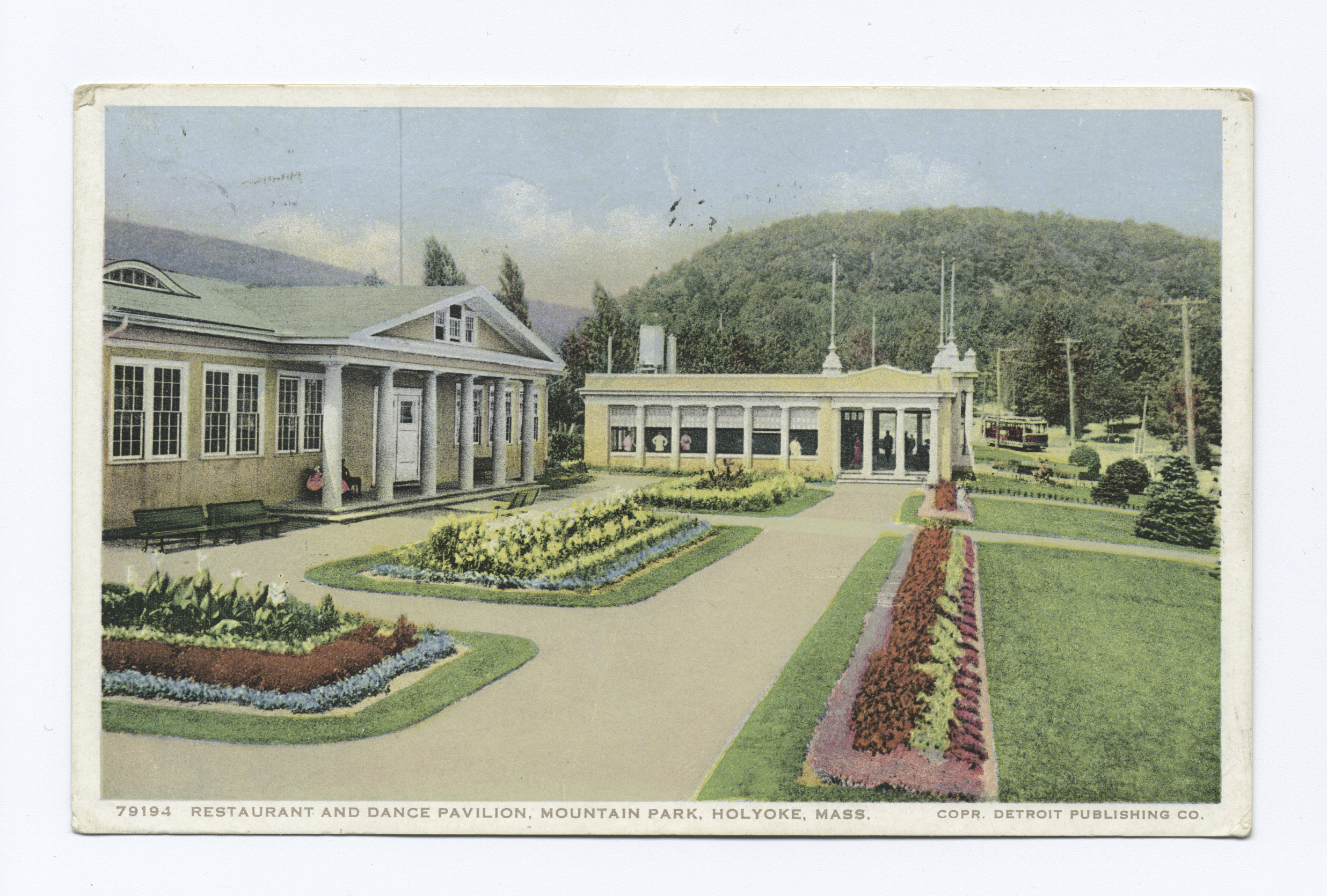
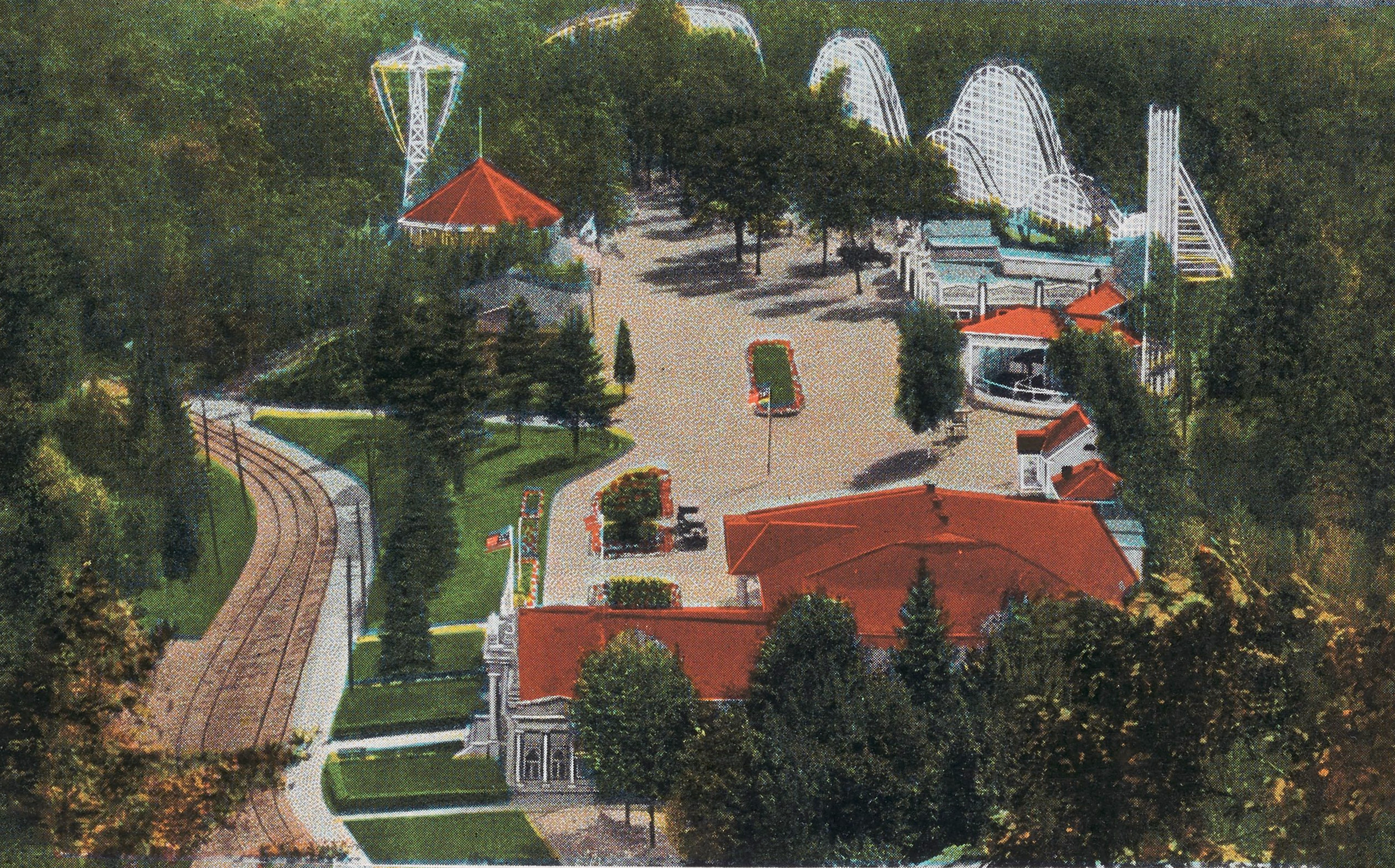
Restaurant and Dance Pavilion; a view of Midway with the Mountain Wildcat Roller Coaster visible in the background

The Summit House burned down on October 8, 1900 and an even larger one was built, seven stories high to the top of its golden dome. It had a restaurant for fine dining. The popularity of the Summit House and the park continued to grow. In 1911, a new ballroom, restaurant and dance hall were constructed in the Greek revival style. The former dance hall was converted into an arcade. The carousel building was given a facelift to blend in with the new restaurant. In 1915 the switchback railway was replaced by the "Gorge Scenic Water Ride." Later on, a ride called the "Tango Dip" was added.

=== New ownership ===
In 1929, Pellissier took ownership of the park. He expanded the midway with a new roller coaster called The Mountain Wildcat, a new carousel (housed in what used to be the dance pavilion), a Circle Swing (called Aeroplanes), Midget Auto Cars (bumper cars), Whip, Penny Arcade, Shooting Gallery, fun house, roller skating rink and games of skill. A new automobile entrance was created off of Route 5. But Pellissier's timing was unfortunate: that year the Great Depression took hold. And in May, the Summit House burned down once again. It was replaced by a smaller all-metal building, but by then with trolleys disappearing and people driving to wherever they needed to go, the Summit House no longer was as popular. It and the cable car system were torn down. Eventually the trolleys vanished as well.

Even so, Mountain Park remained open for over twenty years under the leadership of Pellissier until the Collins family purchased it in December, 1952. That began the park's renaissance. John Collins owned Lincoln Park in North Dartmouth, Massachusetts. He placed his brother Dennis (who also ran New Hampshire's Pine Island Park) and his son John J. in charge of the park. They added a Kiddieland area to attract the young families who were populating the area. The midway was extensively renovated. Many new rides were brought in and the roller coaster was renamed The Mountain Flyer.

=== Heyday ===
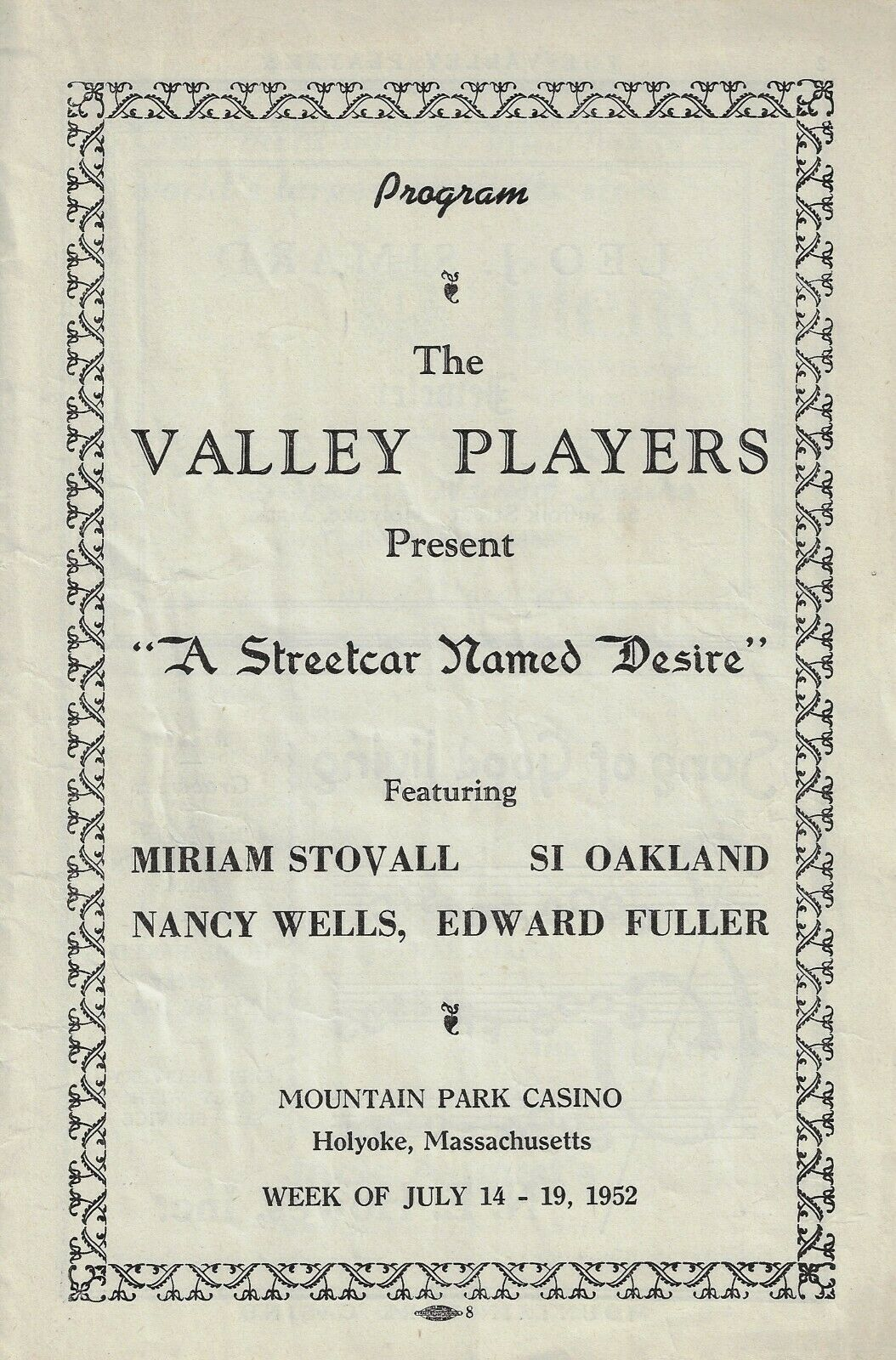
One of several graphics used by the amusement park, c. 1960s-1987; a playbill for A Streetcar Named Desire, by the Valley Players, July 14–19, 1952

Throughout the 1960s, Mountain Park was one of the most popular entertainment spots in the Pioneer Valley. Teenagers flocked to the park to hear the latest rock and roll acts and take a spin on the big rides. Parents relaxed under the trees in the expansive picnic grove, and little tykes frolicked in Kiddieland. Throughout the years, the park was modified and improved, with colorful art deco styling and brightly lit structures designed by legendary roller coaster builder Edward Leis and Rhode Island craftsman Dominic Spadola. Together they designed three different walk-through fun houses and three different dark rides at the park.

From 1941 through 1962, the Casino was home to The Valley Players, a theater company that produced plays and musicals throughout the summer. A young Hal Holbrook was part of the cast from 1951 through 1954 and returned to the Casino in 1957 to perform his one-man show Mark Twain Tonight! as the Valley Players' season opener. When the Valley Players folded, Nikos Psacharopoulos established an Equity company called the Casino-in-the-Park Playhouse in the theater where, with directors Ted Mann and Keith Fowler, he produced an artistically strong but financially difficult season of plays by Shakespeare, Shaw, Brecht, and Tennessee Williams. After 1964 a succession of managers was unable to make the Casino financially viable again.

Larry Chesky and His Orchestra entertained guests as a regular band at the Park for more than 30 seasons

In 1971, Collins leased the park to the food service company ARASERV which added a few new rides including the Sky Ride, a chair lift that brought riders down to the Animal Land zoo that was situated near the Casino. On June 11 of that year, a natural gas explosion leveled the Tap Room and Stardust Ballroom building while the Holyoke High School prom was taking place inside. Two park employees died in the explosion and resulting fire. The Tap Room and Stardust Ballroom were never rebuilt.

The following year, the Casino was demolished. Collins then took control of the park back from ARASERV. Throughout the 1970s, the midway stage played host to everything from soap opera stars to nostalgia acts such as Danny and the Juniors to bodybuilding competitions. In 1972 sports journalist Charles Gaines asked photographer George Butler to join him in covering the International Federation of Bodybuilding and Fitness's (IFBB) 1972 "Mr. East Coast" competition there for Sports Illustrated. The shoot included winner Leon Brown, the first bodybuilder to be showcased in the magazine. But more significantly, a young Arnold Schwarzenegger was also featured at the competition as a guest poser. Butler recognized Schwarzenegger's stage presence and he and Gaines would go on to make Pumping Iron, a book and subsequent movie which introduced bodybuilding to the American mainstream. Portions of the film were taken at the park, and it would prove to be the launching point of Arnold's career as an actor on the silver screen. In addition to bodybuilding, regular wrestling matches took place at the Midway venue featuring Walter "Killer" Kowalski. One afternoon "Killer" bodyslammed Mark "Marbles" Midura so hard the ring collapsed around "Marbles" and his manager Nelson Brothers. Bingo was a big attraction for senior citizens in the Clambake Pavilion every Sunday, as was popular polka king Larry Chesky, a Holyoke native, and his orchestra. Happy Louie and Julcia's Polka Band, led by Louie Dusseault, also regularly performed at the Pavilion, including in his sets the eponymous Mountain Park Polka.

=== Decline ===
Massachusetts entered an economic recession in the late 1980s. The park was still popular; Easter (the traditional opening day) of 1987 saw one of the largest crowds in the park's history. There were a few difficulties, however. Massachusetts had eliminated its blue laws, which prevented merchants from opening on Sundays, that year. People began going to the malls on Sundays, leading to much less traffic at the park on those days than previously. Even though the park had very few accidents, liability insurance costs were skyrocketing, devouring almost all of its profits. James Parsons, the head of the game concessions and known to parkgoers as Pippo, died in 1982. His passing was followed by George Dean, who had brought many corporate outings into the park. At the end of the 1987 season, with the impending retirement of Roger Fortin (who had been Collins' friend and park supervisor for 30 years), Collins decided to sell Mountain Park. Many hoped a new buyer could be found. Collins advertised the entire property (with all the rides and equipment) in trade magazines for $4 million, but with the recession, there were no interested parties. The rides were sold and dismantled over the next two years.

The Holyoke community, led by then head of Holyoke's Water Power Company John Hickey, did manage to rally and purchase the carousel, now the Holyoke Merry-Go-Round located at Holyoke Heritage State Park in downtown Holyoke. Many of the park's other rides are now in operation elsewhere. In 1990, the roller coaster's structure was demolished after Collins exhausted all avenues searching for someone to move it. The roller coaster trains, lift motor and other mechanical parts were sold to Arnold's Park in Iowa in order to repair their own coaster. Beginning in 1994, a series of fires destroyed most of the remaining buildings and all of the structures were bulldozed in 2003.

=== Rebirth ===
Within a few years, nature reclaimed the park grounds. Collins sold off much of his remaining 248 acres (1.0 km^{2}) to the state as a nature preserve but he held on to the 60 acres (240,000 m^{2}) where the park and picnic grove were, hoping for a buyer. In 2005, the city entertained an idea to create a senior citizen housing complex there. But in 2006, local entrepreneur Eric Suher purchased the 60 acres (240,000 m^{2}) of property from Collins for $1.6 million. By the end of that year, the parking lots and midway were cleaned up of all debris, and a new sign was placed on a new gate at the park entrance: "See you in the summer of '07 -- Mountain Park." However the sign disappeared in the spring of 2007 and the property sat idle throughout that summer. Suher then purchased the nearby Castle Hill Apartment complex. Few reminders of the park remained: the entrance to the Mountain Flyer, the decaying mini-golf course, the large blue picnic pavilion and one of the original stone water fountains. By December 2008, the entire park property had been graded and much of the picnic grove had been cleared. The picnic pavilion that Araserv constructed in 1971 remained as the lone reminder that the property once was home to a popular attraction. Suher relocated the pavilion to where the center of the Mountain Park midway used to be, but it collapsed during a winter's snowfall and was never rebuilt. After that, there were no remaining traces of the amusement park.

In July 2009, Suher gave a series of interviews stating in one that he wanted to return Mountain Park to the way people remembered it. Then it was revealed that he was planning a series of concerts there in August. With the entire area cleared of debris and food concessions placed under the steel picnic pavilion, Mountain Park re-opened as a concert venue on Saturday, August 15, 2009. It was an open house, with continuous free music and parking from afternoon through the evening. Entertainers included Sonny Landreth, Johnny A, Naomi Shelton and the Gospel Queens, Rubblebucket Orchestra and Frank Manzi Band. Iron Horse Entertainment Group ran the concerts; it had previously held concerts at nearby Look Park.

The following evening saw the first paid event at the park in 22 years. Indie rock group the Decemberists (with special guest Heartless Bastards) performed before a crowd of about 1500.

In 2010 the park continued to offer paid concerts in the summer, by acts like The Flaming Lips, Counting Crows, My Morning Jacket, Willie Nelson, MGMT and The Disco Biscuits.

In 2012, Suher proposed turning the area into a resort. He briefly had the support of then mayor Alex Morse, but the mayor soon pulled his support.

At the current time, the property has remained dormant.
