= Rhythm Orchestra (Hartford/ Springfield) =

Polish music group

The Rhythm Orchestra Teraz Rhythm band was a Polish musical group that was active from the early 1970s to early 1990s in New England and eastern Canada. The group performed a wide range of folk and popular music styles including polka, oberek, waltz, rock (medium and slow), country, tango, cha-cha-cha, foxtrot, swing, and rumba. As a favorite among the Polish diaspora or Polonia of the Greater Hartford, Connecticut and Springfield, Massachusetts region, the group played at dances, weddings, picnics, festivals, and anniversaries which were frequently held at venues such the Polish National Home in Hartford, Connecticut, Gen. Haller Post 111 and the Falcons Nest 88 in New Britain, Connecticut, Polish National Alliance Park in Wallingford, Connecticut, and Pulaski Park in Holyoke, Massachusetts. The group's first record album, Our Homeland, was released in 1972 on the Holyoke-based Rex Records label, which was founded by Joe "Papa" and Wanda Chesky, parents of Polka Hall of Famer Larry Chesky. Subsequent albums were released on the group's own record label, Wisła Records, which was based in Newington, Connecticut, and Westfield, Massachusetts. Four out five of the group's original members were born in Poland where their musical interests began.

== Membership ==
Kazimierz Pabisiak - leader 1991s vocal, organ

Alicja kowalker - vocal 2005s

Michal Psutka. - vocal sax 2000s

Andrew Tokarz - drums ( mid 1990s - late 1990s )

Stanley Kozlowski - vocal, guitar (early 1990s - late 1990s )

Chris Wypasek - accordion, bass, vocal ( early 1990s - late 1990s )

Frank Barys - trumpet (original member, early 1970s - early 1980s)

Eric Binczewski - drums (early - mid 1980s)

John Burda - accordion (original member, early 1970s)

George Dziarkowski - reeds and guitar (mid 1980s - early 1990s)

Wieslaw Karolczyk - lead vocals, guitar, and bass (original member, early 1970s - early 1990s)

Bruce Krasin - reeds (late 1970s - mid 1980s)

Tom Lessing - drums (mid 1970s - early 1990s)

Felix Matecki - drums (original member, early 1970s)

Jenny Sierzputowski - vocals (late 1970s - early 1980s)

Jesse Wrzosek - organ, accordion and vocals (leader, founder, early 1970s - early 1990s)

Mark Bydlak - accordion and concertina (mid 1970s - early 1980s)

Halina Gormley - vocals (late 1980s - early 1990s)

Mirek Zimniuch - vocals, guitar, bass (late 1980s - early 1990s)

== Discography ==
Our Homeland (1972 Rex Records)

Za Każdy Usmiech Twoj / For All of Your Smile (1979 Wisła Records)

Coś Nowego / Something New (1981 Wisła Records)

Dla Ciebie Polonio / To Polonia (1986 Wisła Records)

Piękny Świat / Beautiful World (1990 Wisła Records)

Złote Pszeboje / Greatest Hits (1991 Wisła Records)
