= James Keane (musician) =

Irish musician

- Born: 7 February 1948 (age 78); Drimnagh, Dublin, Ireland
- Genre: Irish folk
- Occupation: musician
- Instrument: Button accordion

James Keane (Irish: Séamus Ó Catháin; born 7 February 1948) is an Irish traditional musician and accordion player. The Italian Castagnari company issued and continues a line of signature instruments called keanebox in his honor.

== Early life ==
James Keane was born in Drimnagh, south Dublin City in Co Dublin. He reportedly began playing at age six, and lilting since before he could talk. The Keane house in Dublin was a musical landmark on the traditional music scene in the 1950s and 1960s. Keane's mother and father were both fiddle players from musical communities in County Longford and County Clare, and would play host to the legendary players who traveled from all over Ireland to perform in the capital city. These guests greatly affected James and his brother Seán Keane, the fiddler with the Chieftains, as did their summer trips to Longford and Clare where they encountered the music at its roots.

By the age of ten, James had become a fixture on the late 1950s Dublin traditional scene regularly performing with Séamus Ennis, Leo Rowsome, Sonny Brogan, and Tommy Reck, honing his skills under their guidance. While still in his early teens, James co-founded what would become one of Ireland's most heralded music ensembles, the Castle Céilí Band with Mick O'Connor, his brother and others. The band would go on to win numerous Oireachtas competitions, and the All-Ireland Senior Céilí Band competition in Thurles in 1965.

He won the senior Accordion Championship while still a junior in the Dundalk open accordion championships in 1964, 1965, and 1966. He won the All-Ireland junior (under 18) Championship at Fleadh Cheoil na hÉireann in Mullingar in 1963.

== Move to the United States ==
Keane emigrated to New York City in 1967 to play music in the Irish music scene there, part of the American folk music revival. In 1979, Keane moved to Nova Scotia and began playing with Canadian folk trio Ryan's Fancy, contributing accordion to two songs on their 1979 album A Time With Ryan's Fancy (credited as "James 'Skip' Keane"). He joined the band as their fourth member in 1980, touring and appearing on the albums Sea People (1980) and Dance Around This One (1981), as well as several CBC specials such as Pirate's Gold (1980), Christmas at King's Landing (1980), and Home, Boys, Home (1981). Shortly after Keane left the band, Ryan's Fancy split in 1983. Keane moved back to New York City, where he became part of the traditional scene there, performing in numerous bands, including the Ellis Island Céilí Band, which was formed for the Smithsonian Institution's Centennial Celebration honoring the Statue of Liberty in New York Harbor. In 1991, Keane was made Traditionalist of the Year by The Irish Echo, and his album Sweeter as the Years Roll By was chosen as one of the top twenty traditional albums of the last twenty years by Irish America magazine in their anniversary edition.

He is a founding member of Fingal, the critically acclaimed group with Randal Bays and Dáithí Sproule, he tours regularly, performing music and lecturing in colleges about the history of Irish traditional music. He has been flown back to Ireland on numerous occasions for awards and performances, including a trip to participate when the City of Dublin was deemed a European Capital of Culture by the EU. In 2004, an event to honor Keane was organized by Luke Kelly's biographer--Des Geraghty—held at Liberty Hall, and attended by dignitaries including Taoiseach Bertie Ahern, prime minister of Ireland.

== Discography ==
Solo albums

- The Irish Accordion of James Keane (1972) Rex Heritage Disc 808
- Roll Away the Reel World (with Sean Keane and Mick Moloney) (1980) Green Linnet 1026. Track listing of the Green Linnet CD reissue at irishtune.info.
- That's the Spirit (1994) Green Linnet 1138. Track listing at irishtune.info.
- Toss the Feathers (1996) Green Linnet - an unreleased album
- With Friends Like These (1998) Shanachie 78015. Track listing of the 2014 re-master from New Folk Records at irishtune.info.
- Sweeter as the Years Roll By (1999) Shanachie 78031. Track listing at irishtune.info.
- James Keane & Friends - Live in Dublin (2002) Lavalla Records LA01 (recorded, November 10, 1998)
- Heir of the Dog (2012) New Folk Records NFR1552. Track listing at irishtune.info.

Group album - with Randal Bays and Dáithí Sproule

- Fingal (2008) New Folk Records NFR0502. Track listing at irishtune.info.

Artist Compilations

- Live at the Embankment (1965) Keane accompanied by Dónal Lunny
- Sweet and Traditional Music of Ireland (1971) classic album also featuring fiddler Paddy Reynolds, button accordionist Charlie Mulvihill, and pianist Felix Dolan.
- Irish Traditional Instrumental Music (1997) Rounder Records
- The Rights of Man (1991) The Concert for Joe Doherty
- Atlantic Wave (1997) Kells. Track listing at irishtune.info.
- The Boston College Gaelic Roots (1997) Kells Music
- The Tocane Concerts (2000) with Kieran Hanrahan

Books & CD

- Menus & Music, the Irish Isle (1996) arranged and performed by James Keane with Sharon O'Connor, Séamus Egan, Winifred Horan, Sue Richards (harp)

Session Work

- Uncommon Bonds (1984) Mick Moloney & Eugene O'Donnell
- Long Black Veil (1995) RCA Victor 62702, The Chieftains, Ry Cooder
