= Fingal (music group) =

Fingal are an Irish traditional music band, based in the United States. The group was formed in New York City in 2006, regularly tours across the United States and Europe, and released their debut album in October 2008 to critical acclaim.

== Members ==
Dáithí Sproule is an Irish guitarist and singer of traditional Irish music. He was born and raised in Derry City in Northern Ireland and moved to Dublin for university in 1968. He was a member of such ground-breaking groups as Skara Brae and Altan, before joining Fingal.

James Keane is recognized as one of the masters of the Irish accordion. Castagnari issued a signature instrument to honor his achievements in Irish music and on the two row button accordion.

Randal Bays is among the few Americans who play Irish fiddle to gain serious respect for his music in Ireland. His 2005 release, “House to House” (with Roger Landes) was selected by the Irish Times as one of the top five traditional recordings of the year, and the Cork Examiner called him "a rare beast, a master of both the fiddle and the guitar.”

== Discography ==
- Fingal (2008)
