= Fingall (disambiguation) =

Earl of Fingall is an Irish peerage.

Filgall may also refer to:

- Baron Fingall, United Kingdom peerage
- Fingall, earlier name of Finghall, village in North Yorkshire, England
- Nadia Fingall (born 1998), American basketball player

== See also ==
- Fingallian
- Fingal (disambiguation)
