= Holyoke High School =

Location
- 500 Beech Street; Holyoke, Massachusetts 01040; United States; 42°12′00″N 72°37′27″W

Information
- Type: Public; Open enrollment
- Established: 1852
- School district: Holyoke Public Schools
- Principal: Lori McKenna
- Receiver: Anthony Soto
- Faculty: 125.30 (FTE)
- Enrollment: 1,569 (2024-2025)
- Student to teacher ratio: 12.52
- Colors: Purple & White
- Mascot: Knight
- SAT average: 510 verbal 505 math 1015 total (2017-2018)
- Website: www.hps.holyoke.ma.us/o/north
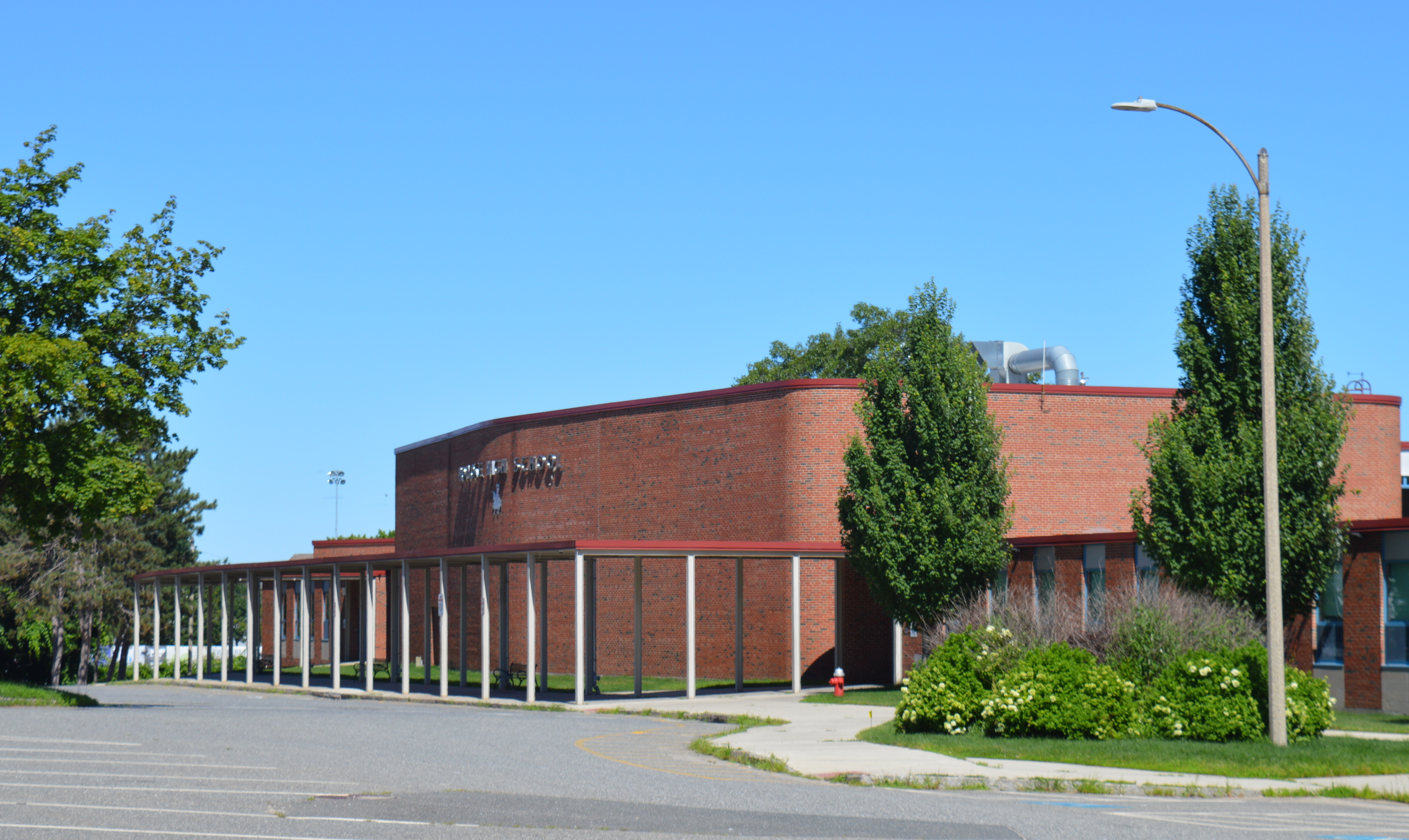
- Holyoke High School, north campus

Holyoke High School is a public high school in Holyoke, Massachusetts, United States.

== Overview ==
Holyoke High School is located in Holyoke just off of Interstate 391. Currently, there are approximately 1,300 students enrolled in the school in both divisions. The school colors are purple and white. The school song is "Hail, Holyoke", which was written by the high school's first band director Fred Grady in 1937 and dedicated to Dr. Howard Conant, a longtime principal who served the school for 35 years.

Academy coursework will build upon the general education curriculum of math, science, and language studies with additional unique course offerings as well as internships and job shadowing opportunities in the field of a student’s choice.

Juniors and seniors may also complete coursework at area colleges through the Dual College Enrollment program, including but not limited to Holyoke Community College, Springfield Technical Community College, Westfield State University, and the University of Massachusetts Amherst.

== History ==
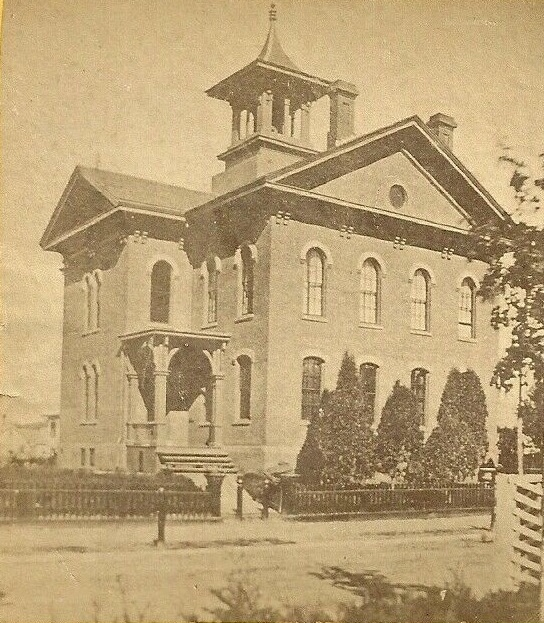
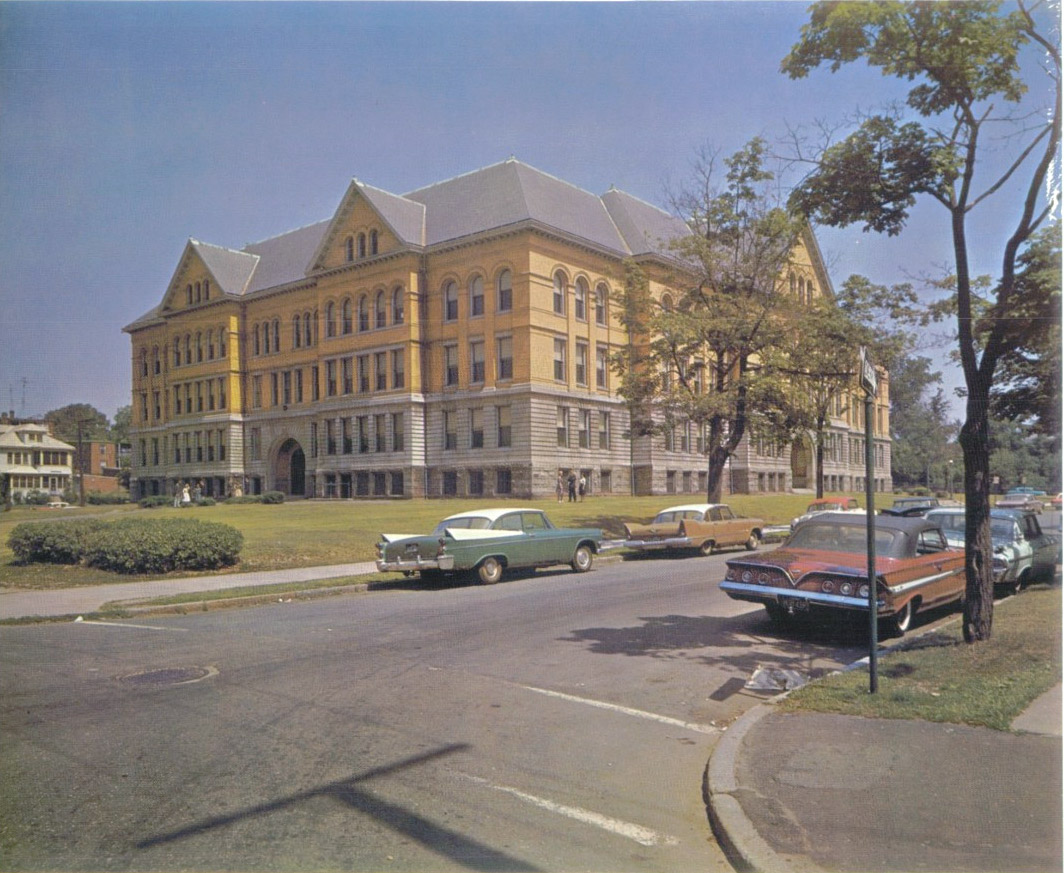
Top to bottom: The first dedicated high school building, constructed on Elm Street between Dwight and Suffolk in 1862; the G.P.B. Alderman-designed high school, used from 1898 to 1964 when the present building opened

Hail! Holyoke High School!
school song, by Fred Grady (3:45)

Established in 1852 by the city, the school's first principal was Stephen Holman, a polymath engineer, lawyer, linguist, and educator who went on to found the Holyoke Machine Company and Deane Steam Pump Works, purchased the Holyoke Paper Company, and was credited as the first to introduce modern cost accounting into the paper industry.

From 1872 to 1881, Holyoke High School was one of about a dozen New England schools which received students from the Chinese Educational Mission. Upon returning overseas some of these students would go on to serve important roles in Qing dynasty China including, but not limited to, Shung Kih Ting, (Note: These names are romanizations of the Chinese language made by city educators and writers, predating pinyin.) class of 1880, who would eventually serve as acting deputy commissioner of the Chinese Maritime Customs Service, and Chow Wan Tang who graduated in 1881 and revisited Holyoke in 1908 as general manager of the Imperial Chinese Telegraph Administration.

On January 21, 1924, the school hosted the first of a series of debates in the United States between feminists Adele Schreiber-Krieger of Weimar Germany and Helen Fraser of the United Kingdom, under the topic "That the Hope of Civilization Depends Upon the Continued Growth of Labor Parties Throughout the World" with Schreiber arguing for and Fraser countering.

During a visit to Holyoke in 1916, former President and future Supreme Court Chief Justice William Howard Taft gave a lecture at the high school on the institution of the US presidency. In 1969 the school was bestowed with the National Bellamy Award, presented annually to one school in the United States. Begun in 1942 by Margarette Miller, and named for Francis Bellamy, writer of the original Pledge of Allegiance, the award is given to a school each year which embodies the ideals of which the pledge aspires. Although the award is annually presented by an independent organization, in recognition of the school's award, Holyoke High received an official citation from President Richard Nixon, on May 13, 1969.

== Athletics ==
The high school's mascot, the Holyoke Knights

The Holyoke High School has sports open to students for every season.

== Notable alumni ==
- William Chadwick (1879–1962), class of 1898, late 19th and early 20th-century American impressionist painter who went on to study at the Art Students League of New York, and subsequently became a resident of the Old Lyme art colony
- Larry Chesky (1933–2011), Polka musician and manager of Rex Records, he was inducted into the International Polka Hall of Fame in Chicago for his contributions to American style "Big Band" polka. He was inducted into the International Polka Association Hall of Fame in 1985, having recorded over 100 albums by that time.
- Ray D'Addario (1920–2011), class of 1938, photographer best known for his work as the chief photographer of the Nuremberg trials in postwar Germany, particularly for his photographs of the defendant's bench, including black and white as well as color portraits of those on trial, and landscapes of the remains of the city of Nuremberg.
- Frank FitzGerald (1896–1961), class of 1914, went on to become professional football player for the Toledo Maroons, later served as a judge in Wayne County Circuit Court, Detroit.
- Kenny Gamble (born 1965), went on to become college football player for Colgate University, holding league records for yardage attained Colgate and NCAA records for yardage; attended HHS, but transferred to Cushing Academy.
- Al Grenert (1919–2002), class of 1940, professional basketball player and college basketball head coach.
- Ron Hurst (born 1950), class of 1968, drummer for the band Steppenwolf.
- J. J. Jennings (born 1952), American football tailback and fullback who played in the World Football League (WFL).
- Melanie Kinnaman (born 1953), actress and dancer, best known for her role as Pam in Friday the 13th: A New Beginning; attended HHS, but transferred to Williston Northampton School.
- Montgomery Knight (1901–1943), class of 1918, pioneer in rotorcraft design, first director of the Guggenheim School of Aeronautics at the Georgia Institute of Technology and a founder of and long-time researcher at the Georgia Tech Research Institute.
- Frank Leja (1936–1991), class of 1954, Major League Baseball first baseman for the New York Yankees and Los Angeles Angels.
- Ray Nelson (1875–1961), class of 1893, baseball player for the New York Giants, coach of the NYU Violets baseball team
- Jim Prentice (1909–2005), class of 1929, American game designer who pioneered electronic board games and was best known for his Electronic Baseball game which he designed while still a student.
- Homer E. Newell Jr. (1915–1983), class of 1932, mathematician and NASA administrator, the principal organizer of the American space program in its early years, who managed virtually all non-military unmanned space missions for the free world from the early 1960s until his retirement in 1974.
- Archie Roberts (born 1942), class of 1960, led an undefeated Holyoke High School Knights football team during his time as quarterback, and was described by Sports Illustrated as the most widely courted high school football player in New England at that time. Went on to play for the Columbia Lions, New York Jets, and Miami Dolphins before retiring as a cardiac surgeon.
- Mark Wohlers (1970), class of 1988, Major League Baseball player, most notable for his time the Atlanta Braves (1991-1999)
