= Children's Museum at Holyoke =

Museum in Holyoke, Massachusetts, US

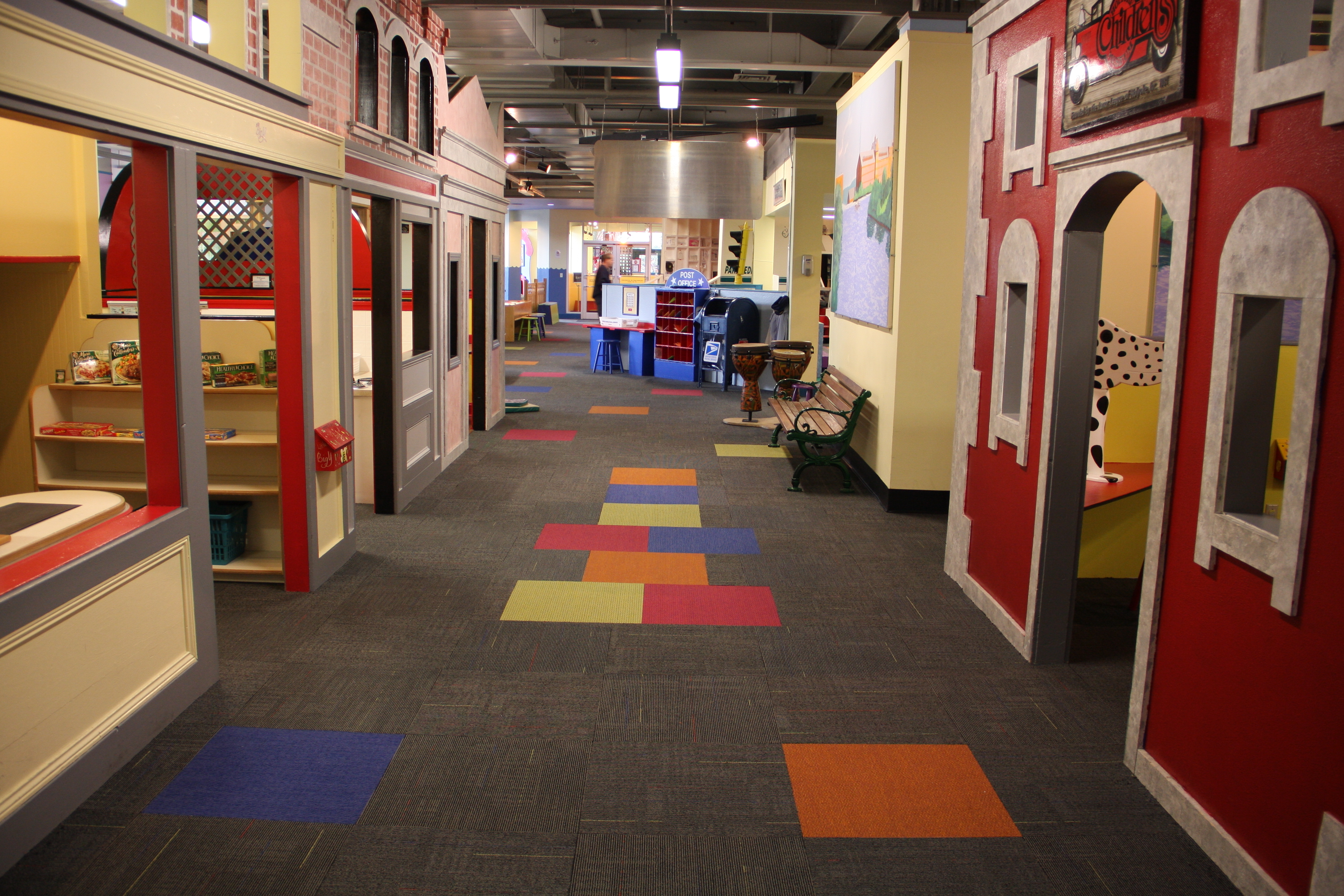
- A miniature cityscape exhibit, including a make-believe supermarket (left), and fire station (right)

- Location within Holyoke Location within Massachusetts Location within the United States
- Former name: Holyoke Children's Museum
- Established: 1981
- Location: 444 Dwight Street, Holyoke, MA 01040
- Coordinates: 42.205649°N 72.606075°W
- Type: Children's museum
- Accreditation: Association of Children's Museums
- Founder: Junior League of Holyoke
- Director: Donald Tucker
- Public transit access: Bus: PVTA B23, P20, P21, P21E, R24, R29, X90 (all)
- Parking: On site (no charge); Ernest Proulx Municipal Garage (Permit only); Street Parking (free on weekends)
- Website: childrensmuseumholyoke.org

The Children's Museum at Holyoke is a children's museum in Holyoke, Massachusetts, featuring participatory art, exhibits related to science, daily life, and an elaborate climbing area. The museum is located Downtown, within Holyoke Heritage State Park, in the renovated Sheldon Building of the former William Skinner and Sons silk mill complex.

== History ==
The museum began as a pilot project of the Junior League of Holyoke, today known as the Holyoke-Chicopee-Springfield Head Start. In the year after the destructive fire that razed the William Skinner and Sons mill complex next to City Hall, the Department of Environmental Management began drawing up plans for a new state park on the site, part of the Heritage Parks program inspired by Lowell Heritage State Park. Hoping to make a children's museum a part of the Heritage Park Project, the Junior League of Holyoke opened a pilot version of the museum to crowds on September 27, 1981, in a renovated storefront at 171 High Street. Modeled on the Boston Children's Museum, the prototype had four exhibits, a mock-up of a firetruck by local carpenter Jay Mulcahy, a mock post office, a paper mill exhibit where volunteers would blend wood pulp for children to make their own paper sheets, and a small linocut print shop.

Although it would be several more years before the museum would relocate to Holyoke Heritage Park, the pilot proved to be a success and in the following year the museum moved to its first permanent home, 15 Papineau Street, at the old Springdale School. In its early years the museum would try several different exhibits, in part designed to foster empathy toward the disabled. Among these was a 1983 temporary exhibit introducing children to disability studies with activities such as having children attempt to tie their shoes wearing oversized gloves, riding different wheelchairs, attempting to read in braille, and completing various puzzles while blindfolded. Other examples included an animal exhibit introducing children to hamsters, rabbits, and other pets loaned to the museum by a local pet store, "Fins, Feathers and Furs", as well as demonstration of the work and training of seeing-eye and hearing dogs. In its first several years the museum would also incorporate exhibits celebrating different cultures, including events such as demonstrations of cooking Indian food, and Irish dancing.

On August 9, 1984, the museum officially incorporated as a separate nonprofit entity from the Junior League, as Children's Museum at Holyoke, Inc. The museum would finally begin its move to Holyoke Heritage State Park with a groundbreaking ceremony for the renovation of the Sheldon Building, a storage building of the former Skinner Silk Mills, on November 9, 1985. Almost two years later, a ribbon-cutting ceremony was held on the evening of June 5, 1987, along with another ceremony for opening of the Volleyball Hall of Fame in the same building; the museum opened to visitors with regular hours the following day.

== Exhibits ==
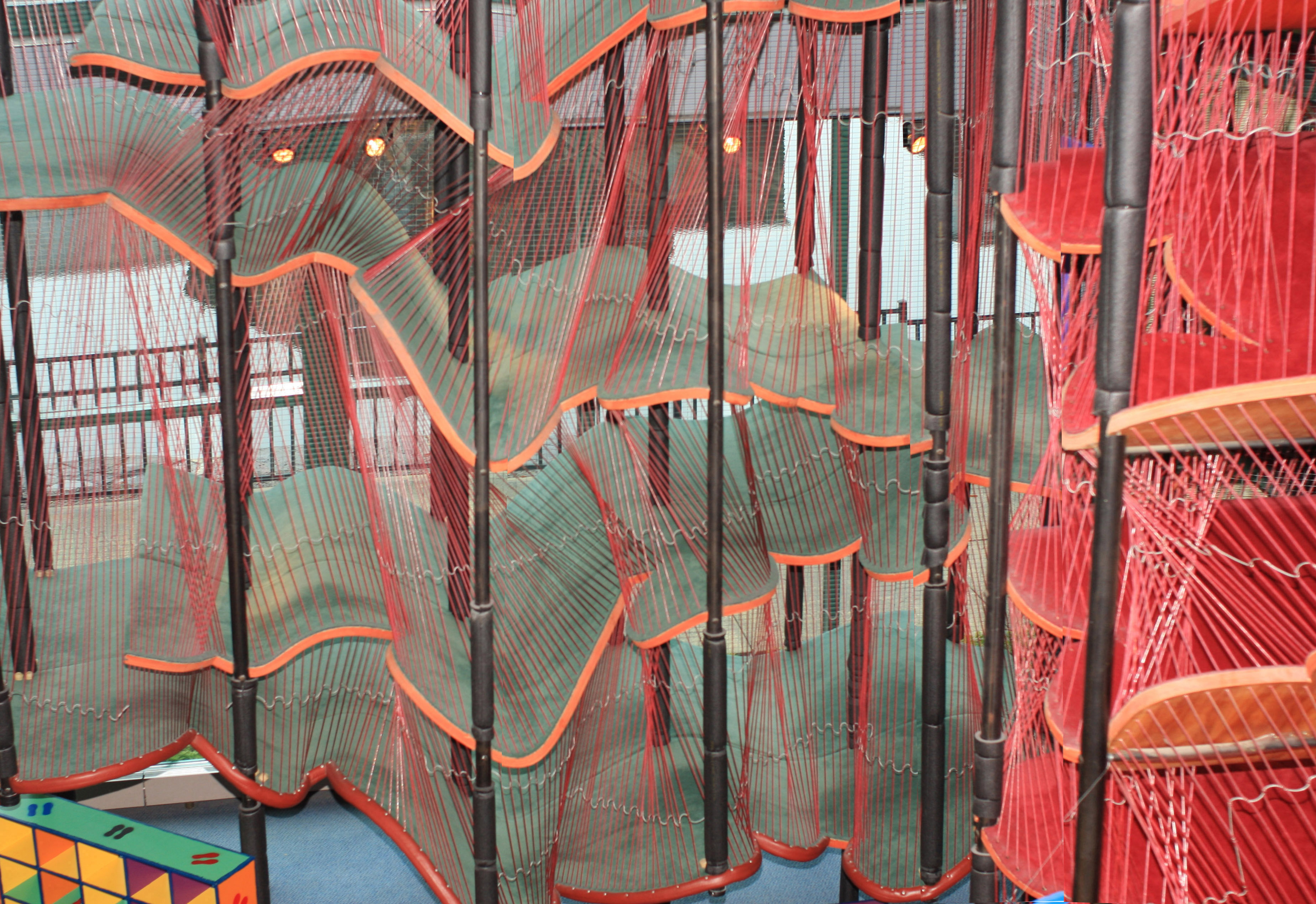
The "Curvy Climber" indoor playground in the museum atrium

In addition to temporary exhibits, the museum has more than 20 permanent exhibits for toddlers and older, including:

- Art Studio
- Curvy Climber/ Curvy Crawler
- Ambulance
- Forklift
- Grocery Store
- Paw and Play
- Fire Truck
- Kitchen and Diner
- Automotive Technician's Center
- Light Bright Wall
- Rooftop Garden
- Puppet Theater
- Tile Table
- World of Motion
- Tot Lot
- Water Table
- Air Maze

== Events ==
- First Night Jr., December 31 - Held annually since 1997, First Night Jr. is an event held jointly with the Holyoke Merry-Go-Round, generally featuring ice sculptures and family friendly activities in the afternoon of New Year's Eve.
- Sensory Sundays, 1st Sunday each month - In October 2019 the museum launched the Sensory Sundays program, to accommodate children on the autism spectrum and those with sensory processing disorder. For these days the museum dims lights and temporarily turns off sounds on louder exhibits such as the replica ambulance.

== See also ==
- Holyoke Merry-Go-Round
- Volleyball Hall of Fame
- Wistariahurst
- List of children's museums in the United States
