= Lane Mitchell =

American ceramic engineer (1907–1988)

- Mitchell, c. 1967
- Born: July 11, 1907; Atlanta, Georgia
- Died: December 4, 1988 (aged 81)
- Education: Georgia Institute of Technology; University of Illinois; Penn State
- Known for: Foundation of Georgia Tech's School of Ceramic Engineering
- Scientific career
- Workplaces: Georgia Institute of Technology

Lane Mitchell (July 11, 1907 in Atlanta, Georgia – December 4, 1988) was an American ceramic engineer at the Georgia Institute of Technology and the head (and founder) of the Department of Ceramic Engineering there, now known as Georgia Tech's School of Materials Science and Engineering.

== Education ==
Born in Atlanta on July 11, 1907, Mitchell attended the Georgia Institute of Technology (1925-1929), receiving his Bachelor of Science in 1929. He then attended the University of Illinois (1929-1931) for a Master of Science. He then attended Rutgers University from 1931 to 1932, but transferred to Emory University.

== Career ==
While attending Emory, Mitchell was an English instructor at Boy's High in Atlanta from 1932-1934. He was then employed from 1934 to 1936 as Assistant State of Georgia Geologist and participated in a geological survey of Georgia.

In 1936, Mitchell was appointed as an assistant professor at his alma mater, the Georgia Institute of Technology. He was then an associate professor from 1938 to 1941. From 1940 to 1941, Michell attended Penn State and received his Ph.D. in 1941.

From 1941 to 1949, Mitchell was Professor and Head of the Department of Ceramic Engineering; the only difficulty being that the ceramic engineering department (as led by W. Harry Vaughan) had been disbanded due to World War II. Through his work, he rebuilt the program and it was renamed the School of Ceramic Engineering. Mitchell would remain director of the school until his retirement from Georgia Tech on June 30, 1973.

== See also ==
- History of Georgia Tech
