= Randal Bays =

American musician

Randal Bays (born 1950) is an American fiddler, guitarist and composer. This Irish-style fiddle and guitar player first gained international recognition through his recordings and performances with Co. Clare fiddler Martin Hayes in the early 1990s.

== Early life and education ==
Born in Indiana in 1950, Bays relocated to the Pacific Northwest as a teenager and has made his home in Oregon and Washington since then. He began playing music at the age of eight, and his musical life included serious study of the classical guitar, prior to taking up Irish fiddling in the 1970s. At the time, he lived in Portland, Oregon, and was strongly influenced by Co. Cavan accordion player Michael Beglan, also fiddler Kevin Burke and guitarist Mícheál Ó Domhnaill. In 1981 Bays co-founded the Portland Ceili Society, an organization of musicians and dancers who presented a monthly Irish dance in southeast Portland for over 30 years.

== Career ==
Since then Bays has recorded and performed with many of the leading Irish traditional musicians, including James Kelly, Martin Hayes, Gearóid Ó hAllmhuráin, John Williams, Aine Meenaghan, Dáithí Sproule and James Keane. He now tours mostly as a solo performer and with various duet partners. In 2002 Bays co-founded the Friday Harbor Irish Music Camp in Washington's San Juan Islands, and served as Artistic Director until the camp's demise in 2011. In 2012 he founded the Cascadia Irish Music Week, a yearly music camp in Washington state, serving as Artistic Director and fiddle teacher.

In 1995 Bays began releasing his own albums under the Foxglove Records label, which he founded, including Out of the Woods, The Salmon's Leap, House to House with Roger Landes — voted best traditional album of 2005 by the Irish Times - Overland with Dáithí Sproule, and several more. In 2011 he released his first solo fingerstyle guitar CD, Oyster Light, which has been highly praised by such guitar luminaries as Tony McManus and Daithi Sproule.

== Critical reception ==
The Irish Examiner deemed Bays "a rare beast, a master of both the fiddle and the guitar," and Fiddler Magazine said he is "among the best Irish style fiddlers of his generation."

== Discography ==
=== Albums ===
- Trad and True- 2025 (Foxglove Records)
- Up The West - 2020 with Frank Kilkelly (Foxglove Records)
- The Quiet Pint - 2014 (Foxglove Records)
- A Rake Of Tunes - 2014 (Foxglove Records)
- Oyster Light - 2011 (Foxglove Records) [guitar album]
- Dig With It - 2009 with Dave Marshall (Foxglove Records)
- Fingal - 2008 with Dáithí Sproule and James Keane (New Folk Records)
- Katy Bar The Door - 2006 (Foxglove Records)
- House To House - 2004 with Roger Landes (Foxglove Records)
- Overland - 2004 with Dáithí Sproule (Foxglove Records)
- The Salmon's Leap - 2000 (Foxglove Records)
- Out Of The Woods - 1997 (Foxglove Records)
- Pigtown Fling - 1996 with Joel Bernstein (Foxglove Records)
- The Rashers (cassette) - 1988 with Joel Bernstein
- Celtic Music Of The Northwest - 1982 with Wildgeese

=== Guest appearances ===
- Lost River, Volume 1 - 2011 Dáithí Sproule (New Folk Records)
- Masters Of The Irish Guitar - 2006 various artists (Shanachie Records)
- Steam - 2001 John Williams (Green Linnet Records)
- World Festival of Sacred Music: Europe - 1999 various artists (CCnC Records)
- Wayfarer - 1999 John Doan (Hearts Of Space Records)
- Eire: Isle of the Saints (A Celtic Odyssey) - 1997 John Doan (Hearts Of Space Records)
- Wind On The Water - 1995 Nancy Curtin (Foxglove Records)
- John Williams - 1995 John Williams (Green Linnet Records)
- Under The Moon - 1995 Martin Hayes (Green Linnet Records)
- Songs From Vanyel's Time - 1994 Shadow Stalker (Firebird Records)
- Martin Hayes - 1993 Martin Hayes (Green Linnet Records)
- The Traveler's Return - 1990 Nancy Curtin
- Above The Tower - 1985 Magical Strings (Flying Fish)
- Nancy Curtin - 1985 Nancy Curtin
