= Holyoke Merry-Go-Round =

Historic carousel in Holyoke, Massachusetts

Coordinates: 42°12′23.94″N 72°36′18.75″W

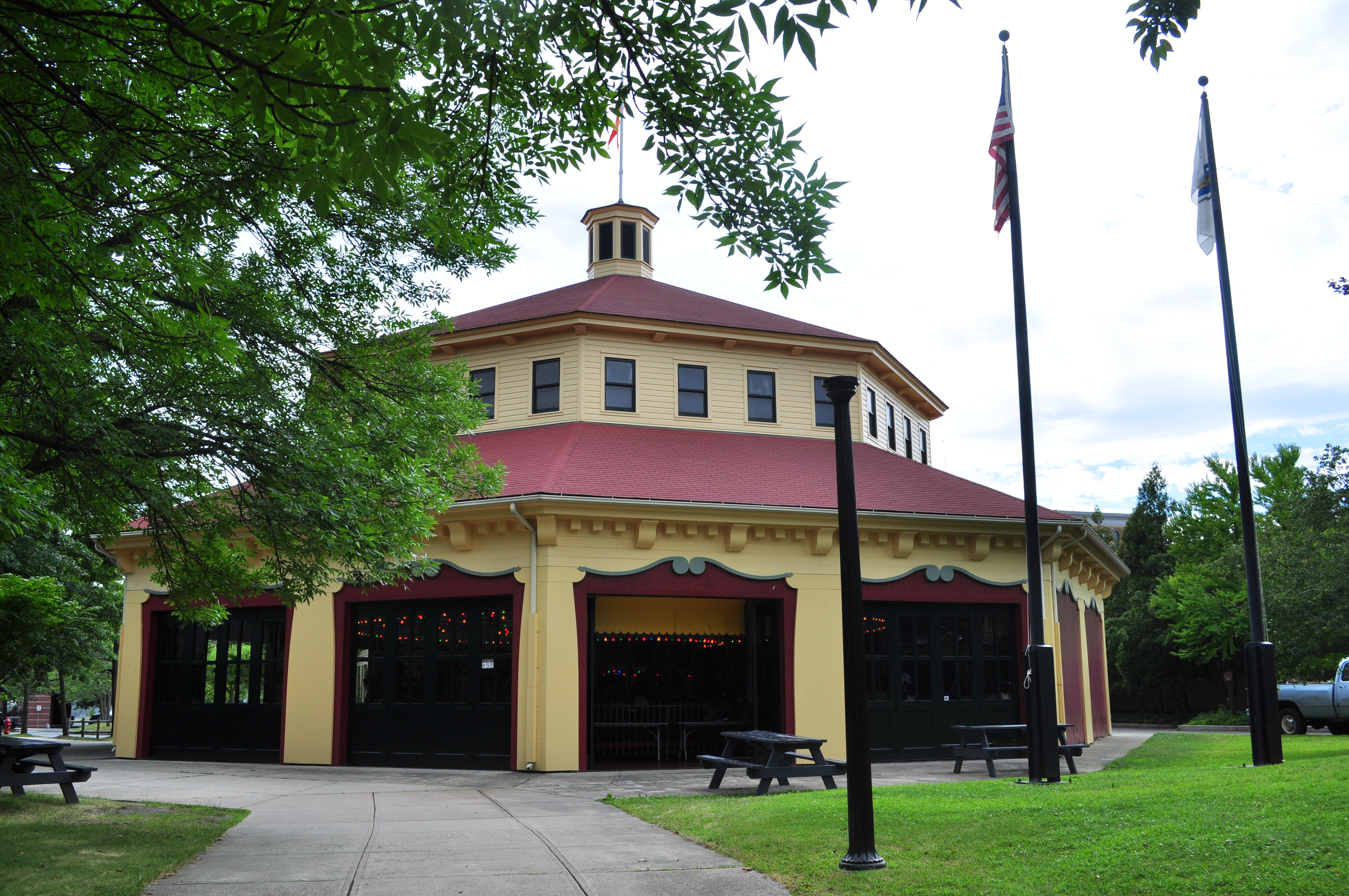
- Merry-Go-Round building, a recreation of the original pavilion at Mountain Park

Holyoke Heritage State Park
- Status: Operating
- Opening date: 1929 (at Mtn. Park); December 7, 1993

Ride statistics
- Attraction type: Carousel
- Theme: Americana
- Vehicle type: Horses
- Vehicles: 48
- Rows: 3
- Manufacturer: Philadelphia Toboggan Coasters
- Serial Number: PTC #80
- Pipe Organ: Artizan C-2

The Holyoke Merry-Go-Round (PTC #80) is a historic carousel in Holyoke, Massachusetts. Previously a ride in the city's now-defunct Mountain Park, it was purchased and restored by a volunteer fundraising campaign following the park's closure in 1987, and opened at a new building based on its original pavilion in Holyoke Heritage State Park in 1993. The carousel is one of about 30 remaining carousels built by Philadelphia Toboggan Coasters. During its time as a stand-alone attraction, it has grown to be a key part of the community.

== History ==
In 1929, Louis Pellissier ran the Holyoke Street Railway Company and managed Mountain Park, an amusement park on the side of Mount Tom. Even though this was the beginning of the Great Depression, Pellissier expanded the park and guided it through difficult times.

=== Acquisition ===
One of the new rides he purchased for the park expansion was a roller coaster from the Philadelphia Toboggan Company in Pennsylvania. At the time, to sweeten the deal and get a park to buy one of their coasters, PTC would often "throw in" one of their merry-go-rounds. This was the case at Mountain Park.

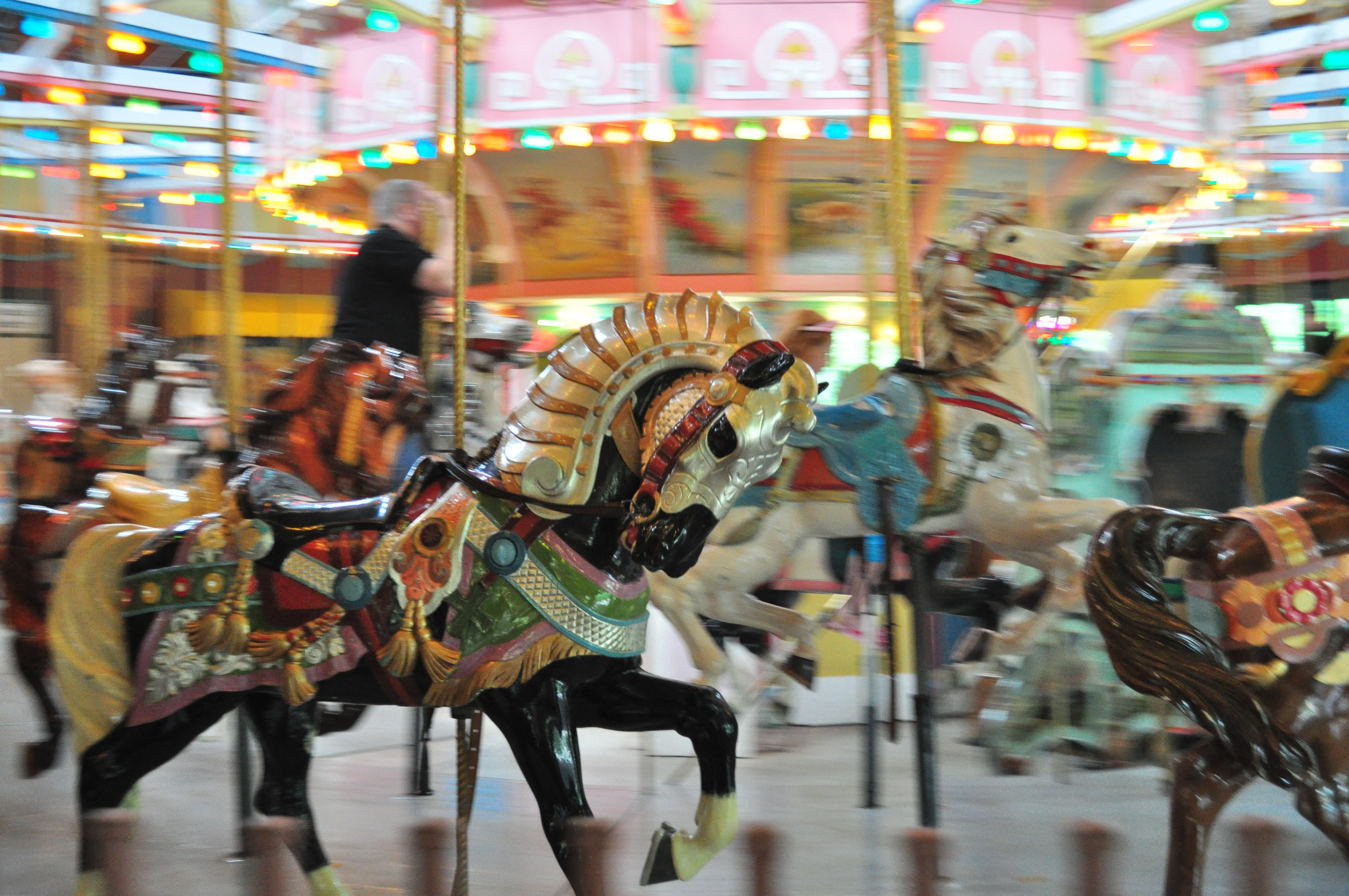
Armored lead horse at Holyoke

The Philadelphia Toboggan Company employed German and Italian craftsmen to create their wood carousels. Daniel Muller, Frank Carretta, and John Zalar were some of the men who worked on the Mountain Park ride. By that point in PTC's history, they were not actively making merry-go-rounds. They focused their business more and more on roller coasters. The company had a carving jig. The master carver could make a single horse head, and an assistant could then produce exact replicas with the jig. So by 1929, PTC had a stockpile of carousel horses.

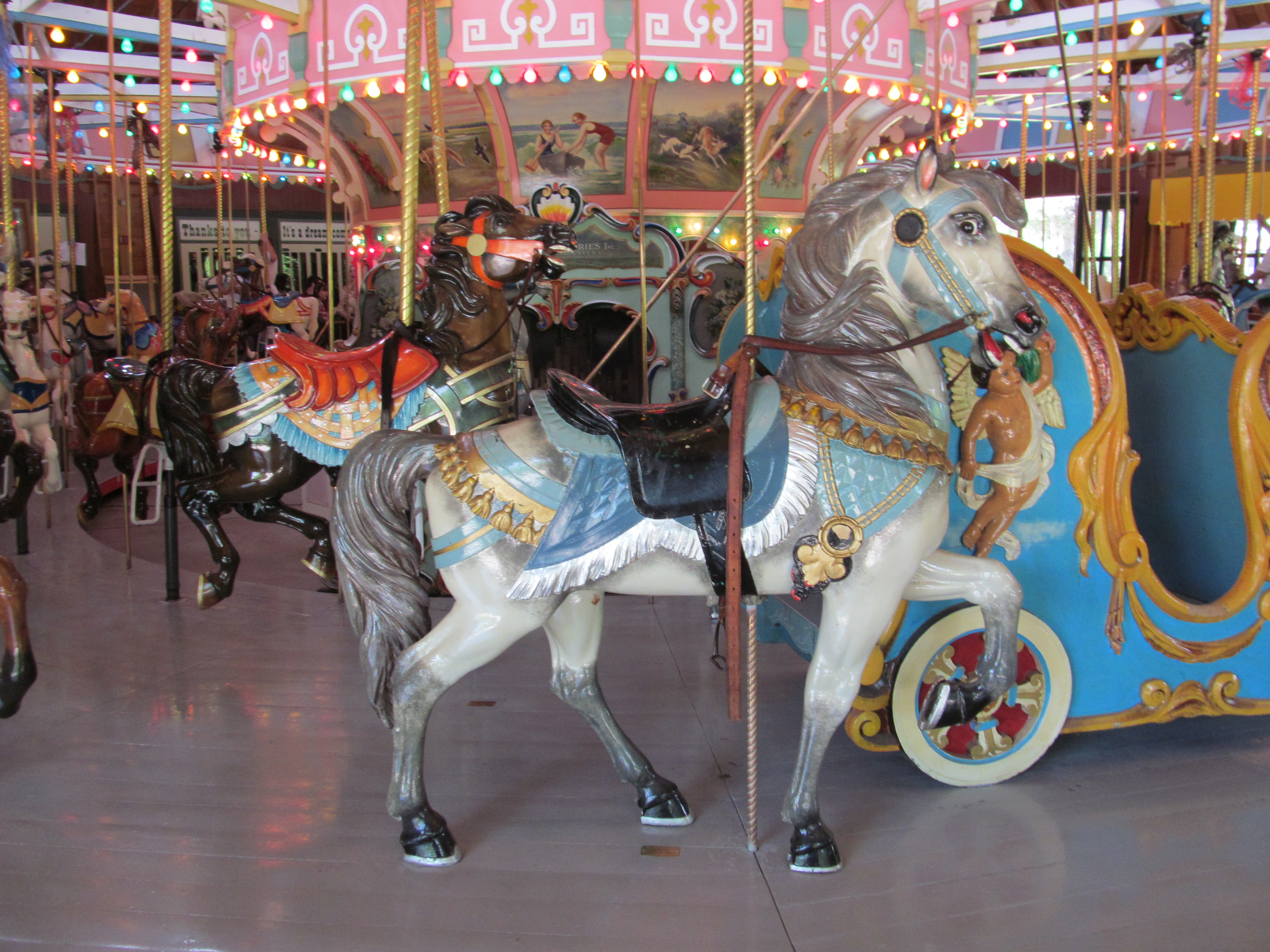
Holyoke Merry-Go-Round horses

The merry-go-round destined for Mountain Park was most likely fabricated in 1927. It was sold to a different park initially, but for some reason was never shipped. So instead it was shipped to Pellissier. First, Pellissier asked for more time before it was sent, because he was getting the pavilion ready. What he was doing was converting one of the oldest structures in the park (at the time being used as an arcade) and modifying it for the merry-go-round. Pellissier couldn't have chosen a better structure. The pavilion—originally a dance hall—was built with timber trusses a foot-and-a-half on a side and forty feet long. Steel trusses supported the wood. The building was sheathed in wood clapboards and survived two hurricanes. Giant concrete footers were poured to accommodate the merry-go-round's centerpost and buttresses.

The ride, PTC #80, was installed and operational for the 1929 season. It replaced a small carousel that for years ran at the north end of the park. The many whimsical scenery panels and rounding boards depicted everything from Swiss castles to sea battles, from cowboys to cars. Most of them were probably painted by Carretta. The ride had 48 horses. Sixteen of them on the outside edge of the 48-foot-diameter (15 m) wood platform were "standers," rigidly fixed to the ride. They were the "show" horses, the largest and most elaborately carved. The two inner rows had progressively smaller "jumpers" that were not as intricately carved. There were also two stock PTC "chariots," basically two-tiered benches. Opposite each chariot at the inside edge of the platform were two small standers.

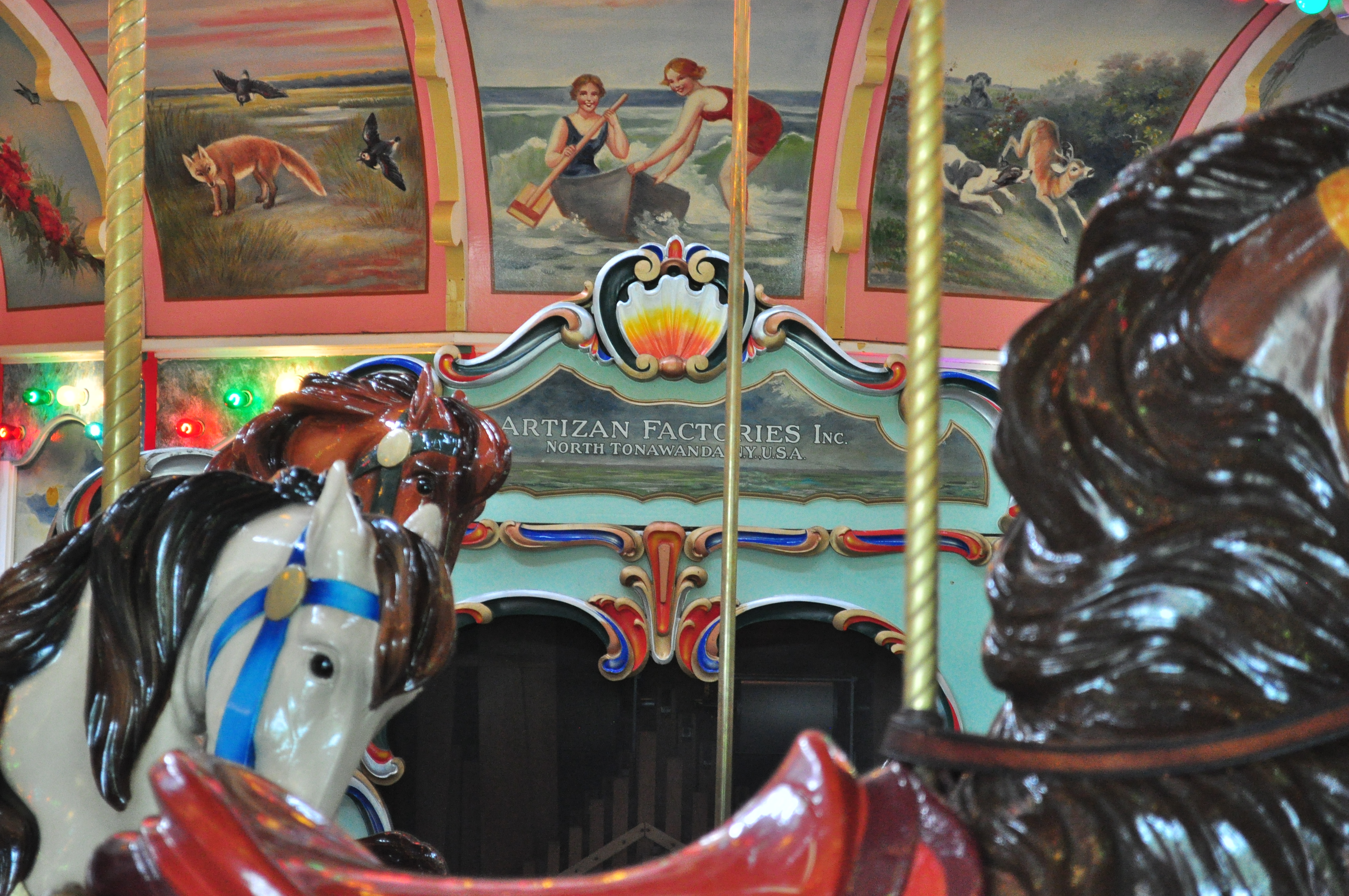
Organ at Merry-Go-Round

Pellissier also purchased a band organ with the merry-go-round. It was manufactured by Artizan Factories of North Tonawanda, New York. The organ model is an Artizan C-2. Using paper rolls like a player piano, the organ played merry songs that could be heard throughout the park. The rolls were eventually converted to Wurlitzer 150 rolls.

The Collins family bought the park from Pellissier in 1953. The merry-go-round remained the anchor of the park. A microphone was placed inside the band organ, and the music was broadcast over speakers all along the midway. The sound of the organ signaled the beginning of the day, and its silence meant the park was closing for the night.

=== Closing of Mountain Park ===
Mountain Park shut its gates forever in 1987. All of the rides were sold—except for the merry-go-round. John J. Collins, Jr., the park's owner, had offers of up to $1 million for the ride from as far away as China. But Collins was approached by John Hickey, the head of the Holyoke Water Power Company. He wanted to save the merry-go-round for the city. Collins set a price of $850,000 and gave Hickey a year to raise the money.

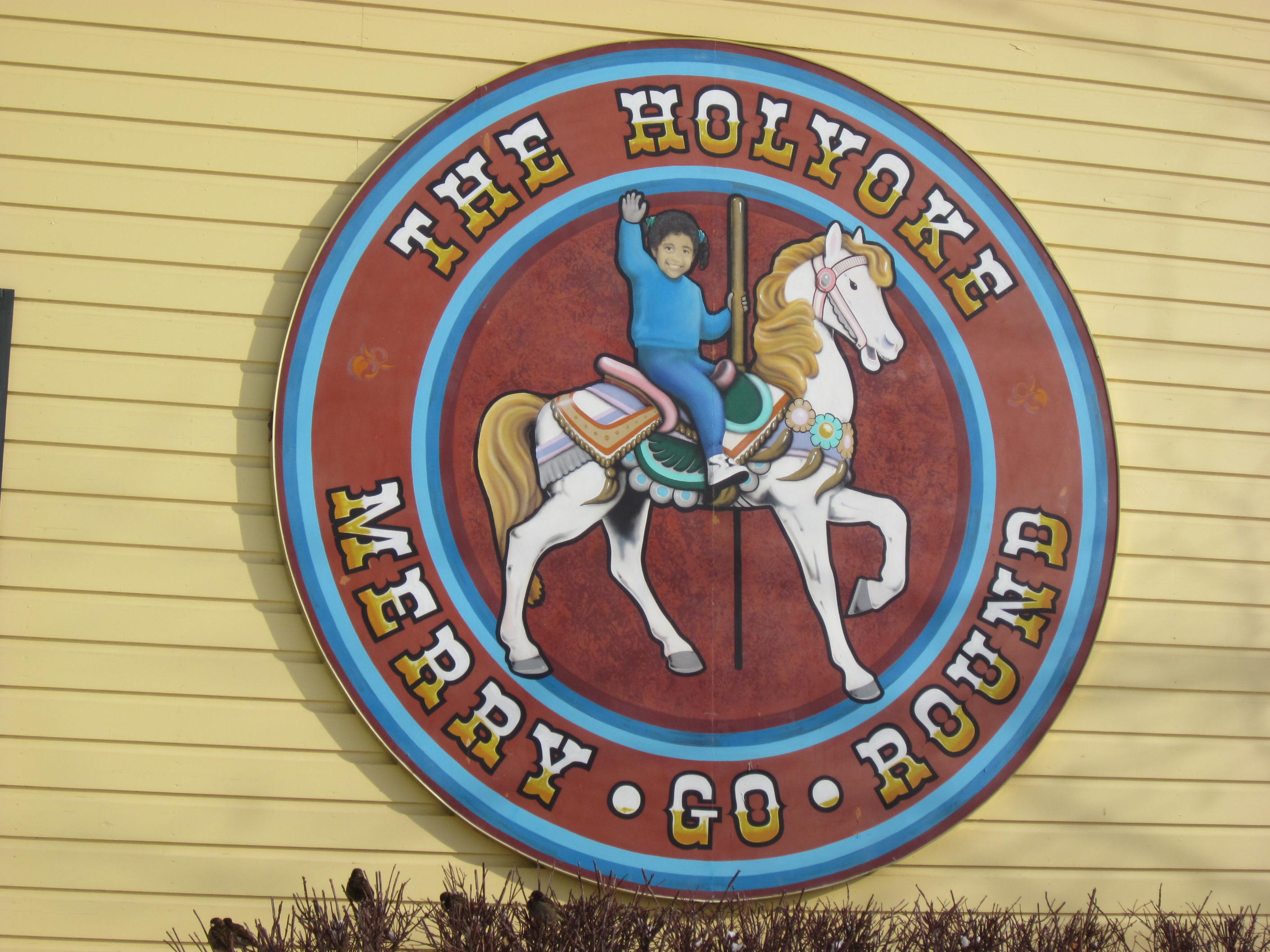
Sign at Holyoke Merry-Go-Round

Hickey enlisted the help of Angela and Joe Wright, who had done a lot of charitable work in Holyoke. They organized a "last ride" day at the park. Over three thousand people came up to the mountain and paid a dollar each to ride the merry-go-round for the last time at its original home. The community came together in an unprecedented display of generosity. Schoolchildren in Holyoke raised $32,000 in two weeks from selling cookies and candy door-to-door. Local performers put on a benefit concert. People all across the country began sending in donations. And local businesses contributed as well. Hickey met Collins' deadline and purchased the ride.

James Curran, a local contractor, dismantled the ride and placed it in storage until a new building could be constructed. While in storage, a crew of volunteers re-painted the entire ride. Hickey brought each of the horses into his house and personally repainted them. Meanwhile, local architect Timothy Murphy was designing the ride's new home. The plan at first was to save the original pavilion. But that option was much too costly. Instead, Murphy designed a bigger building that replicated the look of the original.

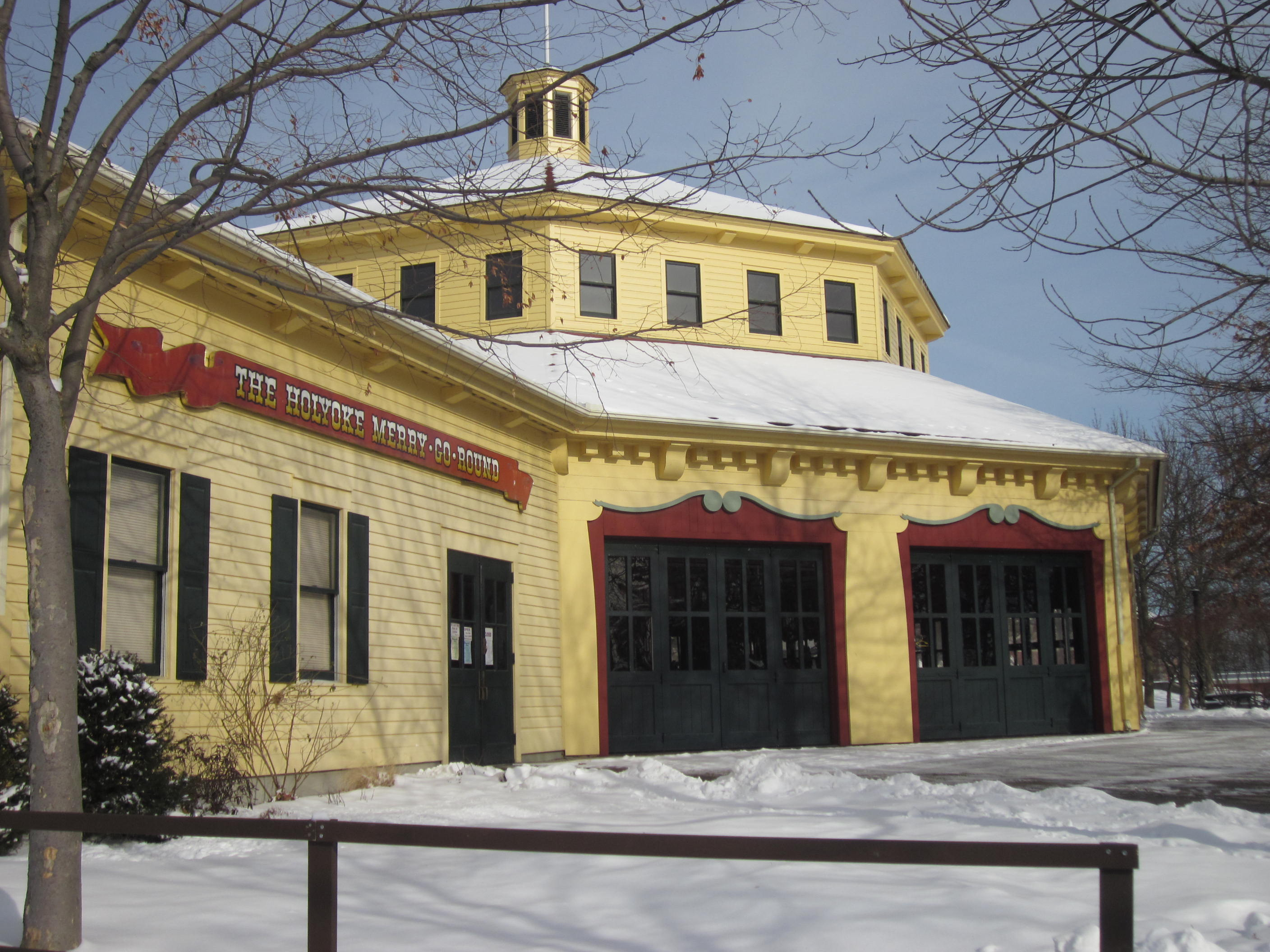
Holyoke Merry-Go-Round in winter

In 1993, the building was constructed at Holyoke Heritage State Park. The ride had its inaugural run on December 7, 1993, with a party for Holyoke Hospital. Plaques were placed under each horse to commemorate donors. The armored lead horse was dedicated to the schoolchildren of Holyoke. The merry-go-round officially opened to the public on December 11, 1993. During its first year, it gave over 70,000 rides. It continues to thrill children and adults alike and has become a beacon for successful community preservation efforts.

== Operation ==
The pavilion is available to rent for private parties and events, and is open to the public Saturdays and Sundays from 12 p.m. to 4 p.m. Tickets are $3.50 per ride, or $10 for four rides.

== See also ==
- Children's Museum at Holyoke
