= SS Fingal =

Several steamships have been named Fingal, including:

- SS Fingal (1861) was a British side-paddle steamer that became a US Civil War blockade runner. Later converted to a casement ironclad as CSS Atlanta, she was captured and served as USS Atlanta
- SS Fingal (1923) was a Norwegian cargo ship which was sunk during World War II off the coast of Australia.
