= Holyoke Heritage State Park =

State park in Massachusetts, United States

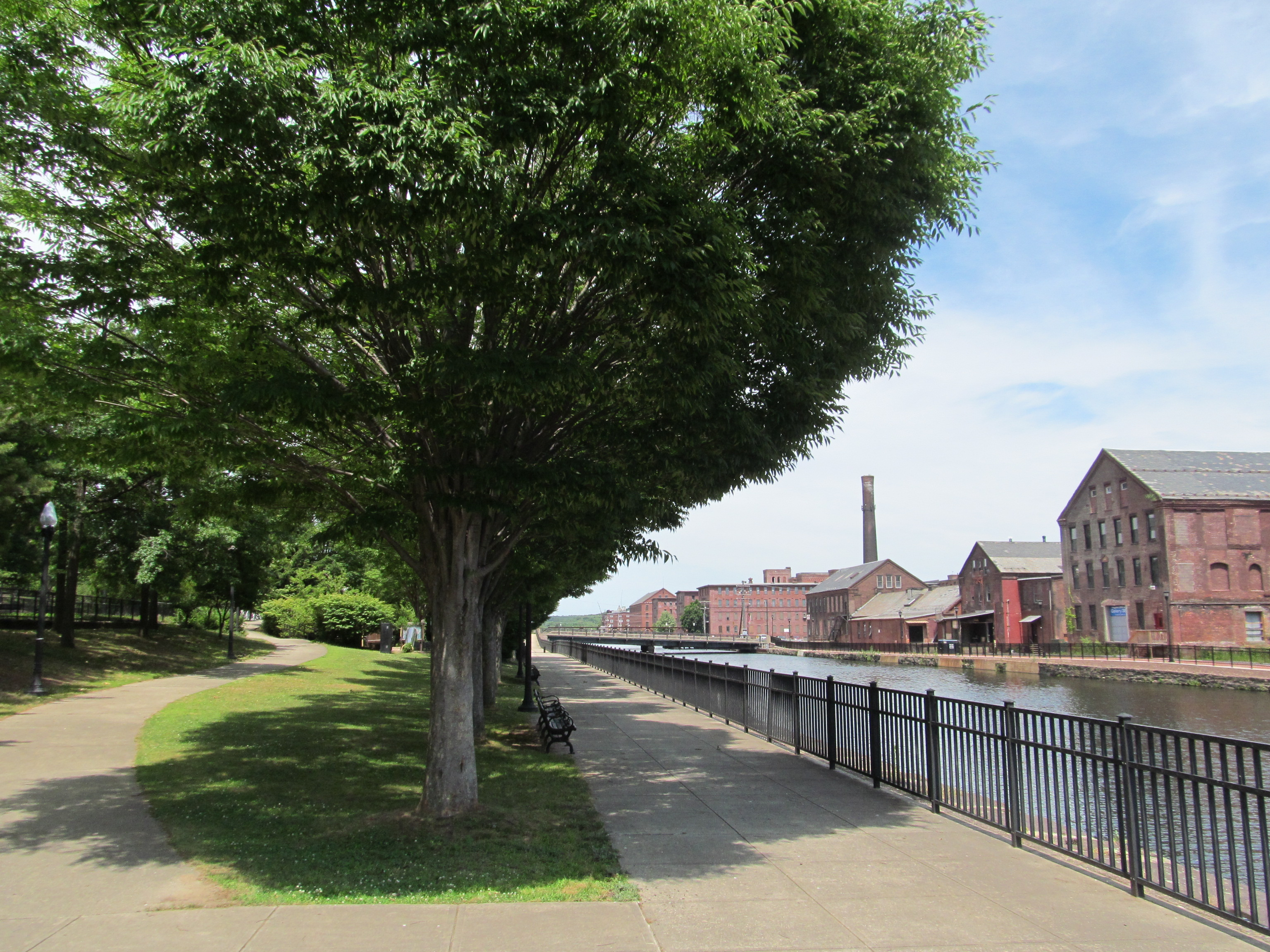

- Location within Massachusetts Location within the United States
- Location: Holyoke, Massachusetts, United States
- Coordinates: 42°12′18″N 72°36′26″W
- Area: 7 acres (2.8 ha)
- Elevation: 115 ft (35 m)
- Established: 1986
- Administrator: Massachusetts Department of Conservation and Recreation
- Website: Official website

Holyoke Heritage State Park is history-oriented state park located in the city of Holyoke, Massachusetts. The park opened in 1986 on the site of the William Skinner Silk Mill which was lost to fire in 1980. The park is managed by the Massachusetts Department of Conservation and Recreation.

== Activities and amenities ==
A visitors center has exhibits about paper manufacturing and Holyoke's industrial and cultural past. The landscaped grounds offer picnicking and views of the city's canals and mill buildings. The Holyoke Merry-Go-Round (PTC #80), the Children's Museum at Holyoke, and the Volleyball Hall of Fame are also located in the park.

The park also features its own rail line, a remnant of the former Holyoke & Westfield Railroad, and one of four tourist railroads in the Commonwealth. From 1988 to 1996 the railroad featured regular scenic tours to points outside of the city, however in 2005 the three Pullman cars were sold to the Berkshire Scenic Railway Museum, which continues to operate them with the state park's livery. Today the Pioneer Valley Railroad provides annual fall foliage passenger rides from the Holyoke Heritage State Park to Westfield, as well as an annual Santa Train.

== See also ==
- Holyoke Testing Flume
