= W. Harry Vaughan =

American academic

William Harry Vaughan, Jr.
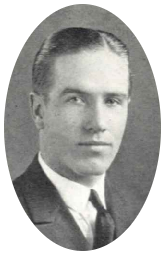
- Born: February 9, 1900; Clarksdale, Mississippi
- Died: May 11, 1993 (aged 93); Provo, Utah
- Education: Georgia Tech; University of Illinois
- Known for: Foundation of the Georgia Tech Research Institute
- Scientific career
- Workplaces: Georgia Tech Research Institute; Tennessee Valley Authority

William Harry Vaughan Jr. (February 9, 1900 – May 11, 1993) was a professor of ceramic engineering at the Georgia School of Technology and the founder and first director of what is now the Georgia Tech Research Institute.

== Education ==
Vaughan graduated from Georgia Tech with a Bachelor of Science degree in engineering chemistry in 1923. While at Georgia Tech, Vaughan was a member of Phi Kappa Phi and Pi Delta Epsilon; a contributor to The Technique in 1918 and 1919; Assistant Editor (1922) and Editor-in-Chief (1923) of the Blue Print; Captain, R.O.T.C; and President, Emerson Chemical Society. Vaughan subsequently earned a Master of Science in ceramic engineering from the University of Illinois in 1925.

== Career ==
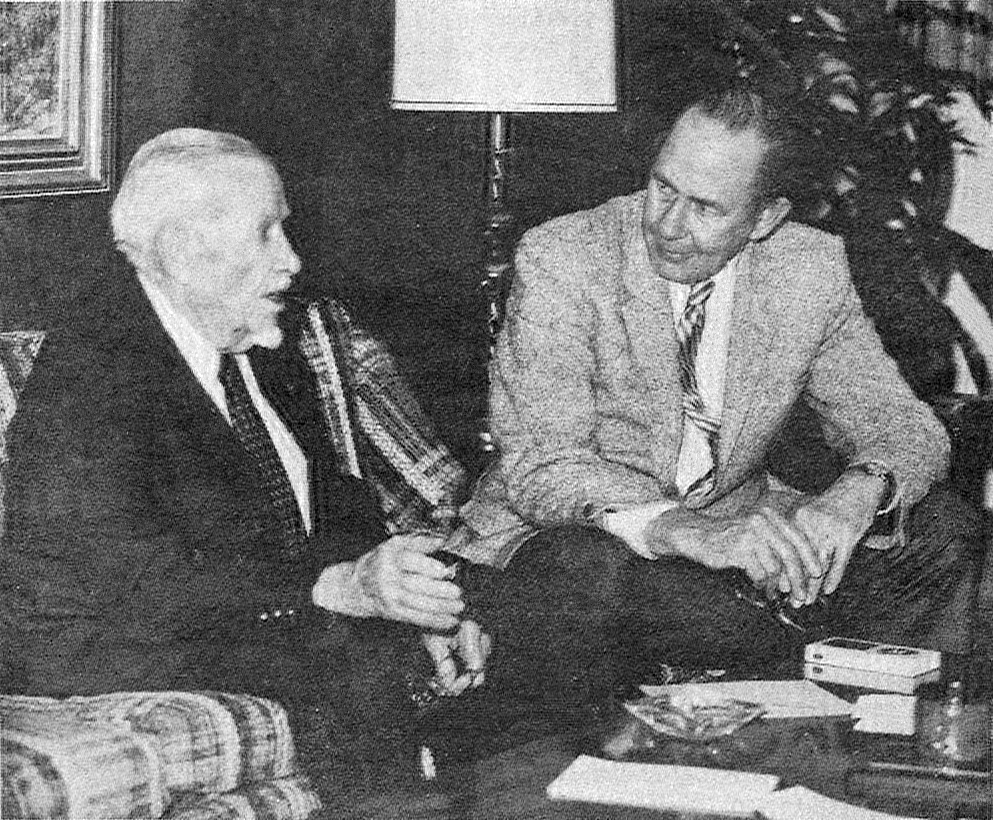
First EES (later known as GTRI) director, W. Harry Vaughan (left), visiting GTRI Director Don Grace in 1984.

Vaughan returned to Georgia Tech and became an assistant professor of ceramic engineering, the second faculty member in that department (the first being Professor Arthur V. Henry). The Ceramic Engineering Department is a distant predecessor to Georgia Tech's modern School of Materials Science and Engineering in the Georgia Tech College of Engineering. In Spring 1935, Vaughan was inducted into Omicron Delta Kappa.

=== Establishment of GTRI ===
In 1929, some Georgia Tech faculty members belonging to Sigma Xi started a Research Club at Tech that met once a month. One of the monthly subjects, proposed by Vaughan, was a collection of issues related to Tech, such as library development, and the development of a state engineering station. This group investigated the forty existing engineering experiments at universities around the country, and the report was compiled by Harold Bunger, Montgomery Knight, and Vaughan in December 1929. Their report noted that several similar organizations had been opened across the country at other engineering schools and were successful in local economic development.

In 1933, S. V. Sanford, president of the University of Georgia, proposed that a "technical research activity" be established at Tech in order to boost the state's struggling economy in the midst of the Great Depression. President Marion L. Brittain and Dean William Vernon Skiles asked for and examined the Research Club's 1929 report, and moved to create such an organization. $5,000 in funds (equivalent to $120,336 in 2025) were allocated directly from the Georgia Board of Regents and the station started operation on July 1, 1934.

=== Director of GTRI ===
Vaughan was selected as the acting director of the Engineering Experiment Station in April 1934, and hired 13 part-time faculty and a few graduate assistants. Vaughan was instrumental in securing GTRI's first permanent building, known then as the Research Building but later expanded and renamed the Thomas Hinman Research Building.

Also in 1939, Vaughan became the director of the School of Ceramic Engineering, which raised his salary to $4,200 (equivalent to $97,213 in 2025). He was the director of the station until 1940, when he accepted a higher-paying job as head of the Regional Products Research Division of the Tennessee Valley Authority and was replaced at EES by Harold Bunger (the first chairman of Georgia Tech's chemical engineering department). The ceramics department was subsequently (but temporarily) discontinued due to World War II, and all of the current students found wartime employment. The department would be reincarnated after the war under the guidance of Lane Mitchell.

== See also ==
- History of the Georgia Tech Research Institute
- History of Georgia Tech
