= Larry Chesky =

- Born: Lawrence J. Ciszewski; November 17, 1933; Holyoke, Massachusetts, U.S.
- Died: January 25, 2011 (aged 77); Boston, Massachusetts, U.S.
- Occupations: Singer, band leader, producer
- Awards: Inducted into International Polka Association Hall of Fame, 1985
- Musical career
- Years active: 1946–2011
- Labels: Musico; Stella; Rex; Tifton

Larry Chesky, born Lawrence J. Ciszewski, (November 17, 1933 – January 25, 2011, Holyoke, MA) was an American accordion player, Polka band leader, inductee in the International Polka Hall of Fame, and manager of the Rex Records label.

== Early life and career ==
Chesky would take up the accordion first at the age of six and organized his first Polka band by the age of 13, debuting at the Cavalier Restaurant in Chicopee as "The Polka Dots". After graduating from Holyoke High School, he attended the Hartt School of Music. In the mid-1950s Chesky signed with the Musico Recording Company, forming the Larry Chesky Orchestra, with one of his best-known early hits being "Our Gang Oberek", created in 1956. Among Chesky's early influences was Ray Henry and his orchestra, an earlier pioneer of the Big Band Eastern style from Connecticut, who Chesky and his band would later perform with at Mountain Park. Chesky and his orchestra would remain a fixture at the amusement park when not touring or recording, starting regular performances there before 1955; he would perform there weekly with a number of other musicians for more than 30 years, until the park's closure in 1987.

Chesky would spend much of his early career touring the Eastern Polka circuit from New York to Chicago, and was inducted into the International Polka Association Hall of Fame in 1985, having recorded over 100 albums. He was a proponent of the "Big Band" or "Eastern" style of Polka, which features more band members (greater than ten), and a focus on horn and reed instruments, than the typical Polka band. Over the years he and his band would back a number of headliners, including singers Barbara Mandrell, Bobby Vinton, and James Darren.

In 1974 Chesky would launch Modern Mail International, a catalog business selling Polish heritage novelties. By the 1990s he had largely retired from his record business, continuing to tour with Polka festivals across the country selling memorabilia. He remained active in Freemasons, particularly as a Shriner. He and his orchestra continued to perform with some regularity into the 2000s. One of his last public appearances was as a guest of a "polkathon" on UMass Amherst's WMUA in October 2010. Chesky died of heart failure at Massachusetts General Hospital in Boston, on January 25, 2011, at the age of 77.

== Influence and legacy ==
Jimmy Sturr, the 18 time Grammy Award Winner for Best Polka Album, said of him: "He was one of my idols. I grew up on him...I modeled my band after his Eastern style." Lenny Gomulka, the twelve time Polka Grammy Nominee, said that Larry Chesky was a "pioneer who changed and enhanced the image of polka to the Big Band sound." Describing the origins of Tex-Mex/ska polka band Brave Combo, cofounder Carl Finch cited Chesky's sound as influential in the Grammy Award Winning band's early search for a style they felt still represented the music of "the common people", in an increasingly corporate cultural landscape.

== Orchestra members ==
Larry Chesky and His Orchestra at Mountain Park, where they were hosted for more than 30 seasons

Instrumentalists featured:

- Larry Chesky (accordion)
- Regina Kujawa (accordion)
- Chet Dragon (trumpet)
- Bob Skibinski (trumpet)
- Stan Malek (trumpet)
- Ken Morey (trumpet)
- Eddie Martin (trumpet)
- Richie Pezda (clarinet)
- Bill Wezesien (clarinet)
- Don Szczebak (clarinet)
- Walt Wagner (clarinet)
- Dan Murphy (clarinet)
- Bill Kosewski (piano)
- Ronnie Pezda (drums)
- Eddie Poudier (drums)
- Chet Pasek (drums)
- Walt Jordan (bass)
- "Papa Joe" Chesky (bass)
- Anthony Chesky (bass)

Vocalists featured:

- Larry Chesky
- Regina Kujawa
- Andy Szuberla
- Gene Wiśniewski
- "Papa Joe" Chesky
- Chet Dragon

== Selected discography ==
Year	Title	Label
	Polish Party	TS74
	Polish House Party	TS79
	Polish Party	TS81
	Castscok	REX 478
	Polka Wonderland	REX 653
1959	Polkarama	REX 654
	Polka Style Hits	REX 660
	Polka Hits	REX 668
	Broadway Hits: Polka Style	REX 669
	Polka Favorites	REX 678
1963	Polkatively Yours	REX 679
	Great Polkas	REX 699
	Big Band Polkas	REX 700
	Polkas for the Girls	REX 725
	Polka	REX 736
	Larry Chesky and His Orchestra with Regina Kujawa Singing	REX 754
	Live At The Big E	REX 758
	The Polka Dolls Plus One (with Greg and Colleen)	REX 803
