= Harold Bunger =

American academic and chemist

Harold Alan Bunger
- Born: 1896; Eaton, Ohio
- Died: August 1941 (aged 44–45); Minneapolis, Minnesota
- Education: University of Minnesota
- Known for: Director of the Georgia Tech Research Institute
- Scientific career
- Workplaces: Georgia Institute of Technology, Georgia Tech Research Institute

Harold Alan Bunger (1896 – August 15, 1941) was the head of Georgia Tech's chemistry department and the director of the Georgia Tech Research Institute (then known as the Engineering Experiment Station) from 1940 until his death in 1941.

Bunger was a member of the American Institute of Chemical Engineers, the Georgia Academy of Science, was a member of professional fraternity Alpha Chi Sigma and honor societies Sigma Xi, Tau Beta Pi, and Pi Lambda Epsilon.

== Early life ==
Bunger was born in Eaton, Ohio. He received a Bachelor of Science degree, a chemical engineering degree, and a Ph.D., all from the University of Minnesota.

== Georgia Tech ==
Georgia Tech hired Bunger in 1927 as an instructor. He was promoted to head of the Chemical Engineering department in February 1940. Bunger was deeply involved in the creation of an industrial process for the economical production of flax with help from researchers at the Engineering Experiment Station and the Tennessee Valley Authority.

Bunger had been involved in the creation of Georgia Tech's Engineering Experiment Station; after its first director, W. Harry Vaughan, left for a higher-paying job at the Tennessee Valley Authority in December 1940, Bunger was named acting director of the station. Less than a year later, Bunger died suddenly on August 15, 1941 while visiting Minneapolis, Minnesota.

== Legacy ==
Georgia Tech's Bunger-Henry building is named after Harold Bunger and Arthur V. Henry. Built in 1964, it houses part of Georgia Tech's Chemical Engineering program.

== See also ==
- History of Georgia Tech
