= Happy Louie and Julcia's Polka Band =

Music band

Happy Louie, born Louis George Dusseault on August 4, 1934 in Ware, Massachusetts, was a musician and leader of the Happy Louie and Julcia's Polka Band. He received a Grammy nomination for Best Polka Album in 1995. He was inducted into the International Polka Association Polka Hall of Fame in 1982. His MGM original recording of "Accordion a Go-Go" was featured in a major motion picture.

He was born in Ware, Massachusetts and lived in Wilbraham, Massachusetts before dying on November 26, 2021.

== Awards ==
- 2006: Citizen of the Year, Polish American's Citizens Club, Ludlow, Massachusetts
- 1995: Grammy nomination
- 1987: Polka Band of the Year, WESO
- 1982: Polka Music Hall of Fame, International Polka Association
- 1977: Polka Band of the Year, WESO
- 1975: Citizen of the Year, Polish American World
- 1970: Best Polka Album, International Polka Association
- 1970: Best Single Recording, International Polka Association
- 1970: Polka Band of the Year, WESO
- 1968: Best Polka Album, International Polka Association
- 1966: Polka Band of the Year, WESO

== Discography ==
- Sing Along
- Shake it Up
- Good Luck
- Love and Peace
- The Family Album
- Christmas Carols
- Red, White and Beauty
- Oldies but Goodies
- Red Hot Polkas
- Fantasy Time
- Songs for You
- Dreams of Yesterday
- One More Time
- Yak Sie Masz
- Our First Polish Pope
- Update Those Good Ole Polkas
- Polkas on Fire
- Polkarisma
- Superduper Polkas
- Awesome Polkas
- Your Polka Sweethearts
- Happy Memories
- Happy Louie and Julcia's Polka Band Live
- Happy Louie's Greatest Hits Vol 1
- Happy Louie's Greatest Hits Vol II
