= Castagnari =

Accordion manufacturer

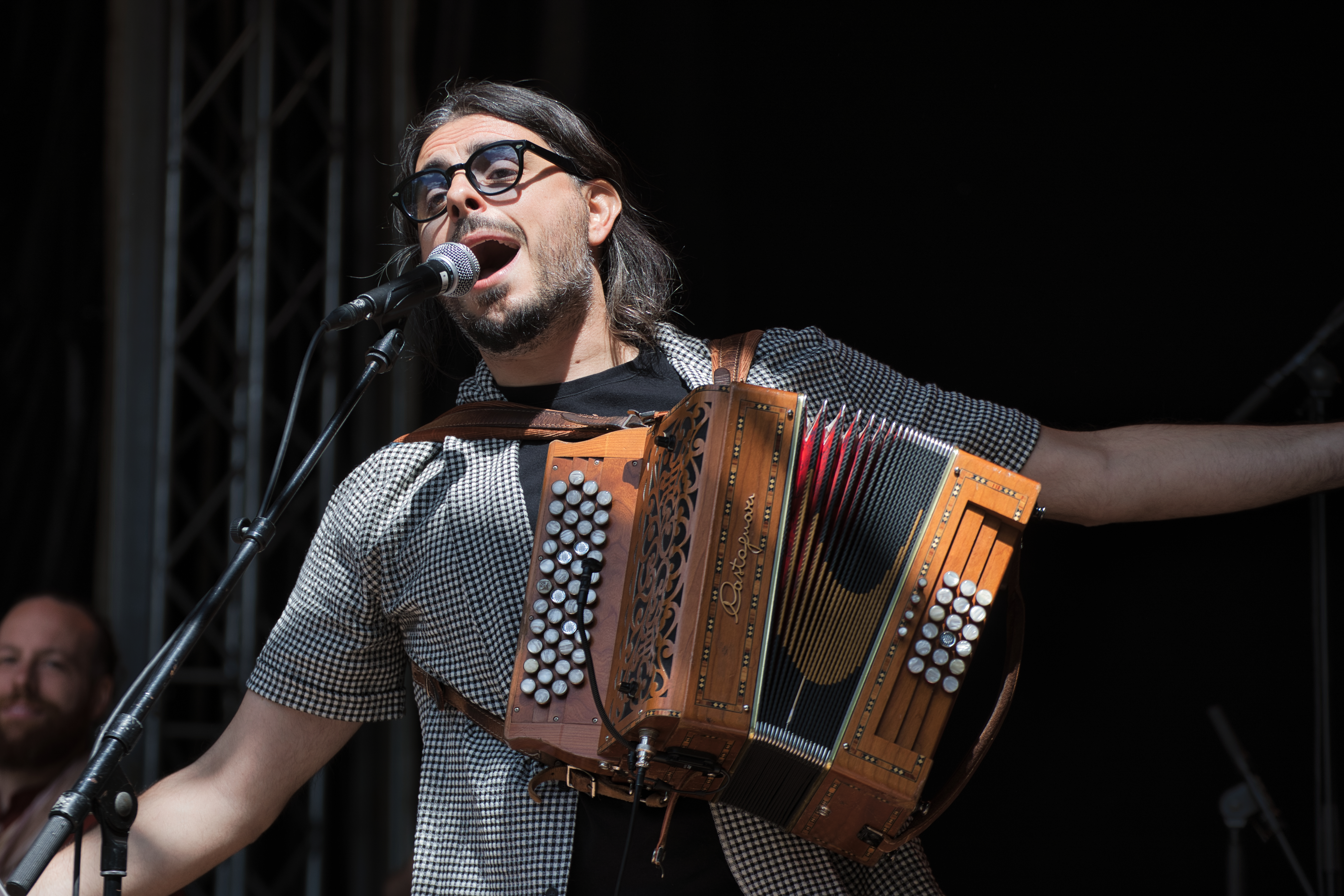
Officine Meridionali Orchestra with a Castagnari instrument (2022)

Castagnari is an Italian maker of accordions and melodeons, based in Recanati.

== Background ==
Castagnari has been producing accordions since 1914. The company was founded by a man named Giacomo Castagnari who had been an apprentice of the famous accordion maker Philip Guzzini. Castagnari opened up his own workshop and eventually handed the business down to his sons. As of 2013, the company has been passed down through three generations.

The Castagnari company is unusual in continuing traditional methods of producing accordions, such as drying the wood in a way that helps enhance the acoustics of the instrument. They have used the same techniques for over a century, and may make an instrument from a single block of wood. Castagnari accordions are known for their distinctive sound.
