= WENS (TV) =

Television station in Pittsburgh (1953–1957)

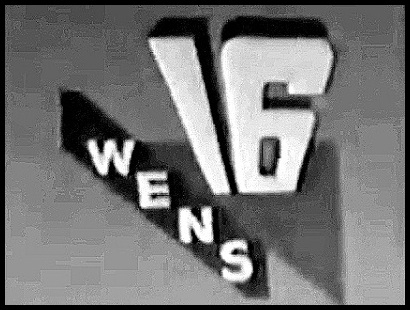
- Pittsburgh, Pennsylvania; United States
- Channels: Analog: 16 (UHF)

Programming
- Affiliations: ABC, CBS, NBC

Ownership
- Owner: Telecasting, Inc.

History
- First air date: August 29, 1953
- Last air date: August 31, 1957

Technical information
- ERP: 200 kW
- HAAT: 265 m (870 ft)
- Transmitter coordinates: 40°29′39″N 80°00′16″W

WENS (channel 16) was a television station in Pittsburgh, Pennsylvania, United States, which broadcast from 1953 to 1957. An ABC and CBS affiliate, it was one of two early UHF television stations in Pittsburgh, built by an ownership group that included Pittsburgh Pirates owner Thomas P. Johnson. WENS was the first station to telecast the Pirates in Pittsburgh and the third station in the market.

For most of its history, WENS struggled with the attitudes of the day toward ultra high frequency (UHF) television. At the time, most television sets could not receive UHF stations without modification, and advertisers and networks alike shunned UHF, even though Pittsburgh only had one commercial very high frequency (VHF) station. WENS struggled to obtain sponsorships to air major network programming. WENS temporarily broadcast some of its programs on a VHF channel; after its tower collapsed in March 1955, some of its programs aired on the transmitter of educational broadcaster WQED for 47 days. The imminent arrival of more VHF stations, whose channels had been tied up in public hearings, prompted WENS to close on August 31, 1957, and sell its technical facilities to WQED for use as a second educational channel, WQEX. Owners of WENS later invested in WDTV in West Virginia, and the WENS permit remained active into the 1960s but was never brought back into use.

== Early years ==
On December 23, 1952, the Telecasting Company of Pittsburgh obtained a construction permit for a new UHF television station on channel 16, one of three commercial channel assignments to Pittsburgh. The idea for the station came from the sales manager and assistant general manager of Pittsburgh's only television station at the time, WDTV. The WDTV staff left the station, then brought in recognized local sports announcer Bob Prince and several businessmen, including Pittsburgh Pirates owner Thomas P. Johnson, to be part of the ownership group. It signed a deal in February 1953 to become ABC's exclusive Pittsburgh affiliate, marking the beginning of the market's transformation from one with a single station, WDTV, to one with competing stations; it then added a CBS affiliation agreement in May, allowing CBS clearance of additional programs beyond the 40 to 50 percent of the network slate that WDTV carried. Channel 16 would broadcast from facilities on Ivory Avenue built by another Pittsburgh radio station: WCAE. WCAE had opted to sell because it was abandoning FM radio; it was pursuing VHF channel 4, which at the time was allocated to Irwin and for which the winning permittee would need to build facilities there. WCAE had been in the middle of constructing a planned 500-foot (150 m) tower at the Ivory Avenue site and had constructed the bottom 250 feet (76 m) before deciding to wait on the outcome of the various VHF hearings in progress; WENS promised to finish building the mast. Telecasting Company of Pittsburgh also got a deal on equipment, buying a purchase order from radio station WQAN, which had applied for and abandoned a bid to start channel 16 in Scranton, in northeastern Pennsylvania. (Note: WQAN, owned by The Scranton Times, and its partner in the channel 16 application had instead become part-owners of the channel 22 station in Scranton, WGBI-TV.)

WENS began broadcasting a test pattern on August 24, 1953. After replacing several defective parts, and with hours to spare, the station made its air date deadline of August 29 in time to carry a Pirates baseball game from Forbes Field. It was the second UHF outlet behind WKJF-TV (channel 53), which began at the start of the month. The baseball telecast was one of four slated in the remainder of the 1953 season and the first-ever telecast of a Pirates game played in Pittsburgh. With WKJF-TV and WENS having broken WDTV's monopoly on television in Pittsburgh, channel 16 initially boasted of sponsor interest and market impact "beyond expectations" and sold almost all of its advertising time. In October 1953, Telecasting Company of Pittsburgh was restructured as Telecasting, Inc., in order to bring in new stockholders.

WENS initially maintained studios at the Ivory Avenue transmitter site, but by the end of the year, work was under way on full facilities costing $400,000 at a site on Mt. Troy Avenue. In spite of building the studios, financial considerations prompted the station to instead increase its use of network programs. Some NBC shows were among them after WKJF-TV closed in July 1954. The station began facing difficulties common to other UHF broadcasters of the time and was unable to secure a local sponsor for Kukla, Fran and Ollie when that show was dropped by WDTV for Captain Video, a production of its owner, the DuMont Television Network. When the Duquesne Dukes men's basketball team made the National Invitation Tournament in 1955, the station secured an exclusive on the tournament over the petitions of the advertising agency who wanted it cleared on channel 2 (now KDKA-TV) as well, only to be completely unable to sign up sponsors and have to surrender the games to KDKA-TV.

== Tower collapse and time-share with WQED ==
Mr. Israel, I just looked out of my window to where our tower is. It isn't.

— Clint Prewitt, assistant chief engineer of WENS, to general manager Larry Israel on the morning of the station's tower collapse

On the morning of March 11, 1955, a wind storm blowing through Pittsburgh toppled WENS's tower, rendering it and the equipment on it a total loss. The station faced the potential of months out of service, and once again Pittsburgh had only one operating commercial television station.

After the launch of WENS, another Pittsburgh television station had signed on, this one on the VHF band: WQED (channel 13), an educational station. WQED and KDKA-TV, from whose tower channel 13 broadcast, offered the use of their facility to broadcast WENS's programming, and plans immediately were devised to allow WENS programs to be telecast through WQED starting the day after the tower collapse, with station and telephone company engineers working feverishly to make it possible. The Federal Communications Commission (FCC) approved an unprecedented agreement to allow WENS and WQED to temporarily share the reserved channel 13 through April 1; the lone dissenter was Frieda B. Hennock, who had led the creation of reserved channels for educational television.

The combined service aired mostly WQED's programming on weekdays and WENS network shows on weeknights; as WQED did not broadcast on weekends, only WENS shows would be presented then, including Toast of the Town. It was a combination that gave WENS its first exposure to viewers whose sets could not receive UHF and WQED star power and viewership not typically available to educational television stations. One of WQED's programs—Campus On Call, a phone-in program suddenly placed between ABC and CBS programs from WENS—found its switchboard "clobbered" thanks to viewers who saw the show in between Disneyland and I've Got a Secret. Meanwhile, WENS began to work to restore channel 16 to service, using a temporary 150-foot (46 m) tower.

== Decline and demise ==
One position I wouldn't wanna have is managing a UHF station. They surely aren't getting any breaks.

— Wilbur D. Clark, radio-TV columnist, Pittsburgh Sun-Telegraph

Channel 16 returned to the air on April 27, ending 46 days of sharing time with WQED and having reimbursed the educational station for extra costs incurred in the emergency arrangement. However, WENS's time on VHF did little to ameliorate the fundamental problems facing the station, which stemmed from broadcasting on a UHF channel: UHF stations, requiring converters to view, had smaller audiences, and advertisers shunned them for VHF stations. In July 1955, radio station WWSW was awarded a construction permit for a new TV station on VHF channel 11, which WENS contested; the FCC reopened hearings on the channel as a result of finding financial issues with the proposed permittee.

On February 24, 1957, a day before scheduled FCC hearings on the channel 11 dispute, WWSW and WENS reached an out-of-court settlement. WENS would withdraw its challenge to WWSW's channel 11 television station, to be called WIIC; WWSW would acquire channel 16's Ivory Avenue facilities to lease them back to channel 16 and pay $500,000 to the UHF station, with $300,000 of that to be paid when channel 11 began broadcasting. The settlement, however, did not dampen WENS's desire to attempt to move to VHF itself. That June, the station made three distinct proposals to add a fourth commercial VHF allocation to Pittsburgh: one involving trading channel 9 from Steubenville, Ohio (where it was used by WSTV-TV) to Pittsburgh, sending the channel 16 allotment to Steubenville in the process; a larger deintermixture plan that would ultimately bring channel 6 into Pittsburgh; and the removal of channel 5 at Weston, West Virginia, to Pittsburgh. Its final efforts in this regard were denied in December 1957.

WIIC announced that it would begin broadcasting September 1, 1957, prompting WENS to declare that it would cease operations the day before, August 31. The WENS studios were briefly used by the new WIIC prior to launch to house staff.

== Later use of channel 16 in Pittsburgh ==
In early 1957, WQED announced plans to file for the unused channel 47 frequency in Pittsburgh (which was later moved to Altoona), and later the unused channel 22 assigned to Clarksburg, West Virginia, to build a second noncommercial television station that would provide educational programming to schools and businesses. Immediately after the directors of WENS met on August 27 and decided to shutter the station, a delegation contacted WQED and offered the facilities to channel 13.

An agreement was reached in June 1958 for WQED to buy the channel 16 facilities from Telecasting, Inc., contingent on being granted a new construction permit for the channel. After the FCC's reservation of the station for noncommercial use and the granting of a new and separate construction permit, WQED's second station, WQEX, began broadcasting on March 23, 1959. The original WENS transmitter, incapable of color broadcasting, remained in use by this station until it failed on March 10, 1985.

== WENS after suspending operations ==
Though Telecasting, Inc. never broadcast again in Pittsburgh, the WENS permit transferred to channel 22, with the station's consent, when the FCC reserved channel 16 for noncommercial use. The company then filed for the channel 5 allocation at Weston, West Virginia, and ultimately merged with the other applicant, J. Patrick Beacom's WJPB-TV channel 35 in Fairmont, with Thomas P. Johnson and George Eby paying $200,000 for half of the company. Protests from other area stations delayed approval of the transaction, which created today's WDTV, until December 1961.

The WENS construction permit remained active for more than a decade after the station suspended operations. In 1965, Telecasting filed to sell it to Springfield Television, which owned two other stations on the same channel: WKEF in Dayton, Ohio, and WWLP in Springfield, Massachusetts. Springfield even filed for a channel 14 construction permit in Greensburg to serve as a satellite station of WENS. Springfield then signed a franchise agreement with the Telemeter pay television system for several stations, including WENS. However, citing the financial difficulties of its Dayton station and trouble selecting a new antenna site, WENS remained off the air.

Springfield filed to sell WENS and WJZB-TV in Worcester, Massachusetts, to United Artists in 1968, but the sale proposal was dropped over concerns it would derail the then-proposed merger of Metromedia into UA corporate parent Transamerica Corporation; instead, a sale agreement was reached with Evans Broadcasting, owned by Thomas Mellon Evans, who sought approval to buy four different silent UHF television stations. The purchase languished so long at the FCC that Springfield canceled the sale agreement in September 1969, prompting Evans to petition the commission to declare the WENS construction permit—now off air for more than 12 years—expired or forfeited. The permit then finally lapsed in 1970, leaving channel 22 open for new applicants again.

A new channel 22 television station in Pittsburgh would sign on in 1978, when the Baltimore-based Commercial Radio Institute, the direct predecessor to today's Sinclair Broadcast Group, built WPTT-TV (now WPNT). In 1991, when Sinclair purchased WPGH-TV and sold WPTT-TV to a party that let Sinclair handle most of its operations under a local marketing agreement, the latter station moved into the Ivory Avenue facility, where WPGH-TV had been based since its return to the air in 1969.

== See also ==
- UHF television broadcasting § United States
