= Little Tom Mountain =

Protected natural area in Massachusetts, United States

Coordinates: 42.2491°N 72.6332°W

- Interactive map of Little Tom Mountain
- Established: 2002
- Operator: The Trustees of Reservations
- Website: Little Tom Mountain

Little Tom Mountain is a 73-acre (300,000 m^{2}) nature preserve in Holyoke, Massachusetts and is managed by the Trustees of Reservations. The land was purchased in 2002 by a joint effort of the Trustees of Reservations, U.S. Fish and Wildlife Service, the Department of Conservation and Recreation, and the Holyoke Boys & Girls Club from the holders of the former Mt. Tom Ski area. The Trustees and the Holyoke Boys and Girls Club have a cooperative management approach of the area and run an environmental education program together.

== Ancient history ==
Evidence of early occupants of the area can be found in the dinosaur fossil tracks in the sandstone bedrock at Dinosaur Footprints Reservation to the east of Little Tom. Eubrontes giganteus, Anchisauripus sp., and Grallator cuneatus, all bipedal theropods, lived in this area some 200 million years ago. Although no fossil tracks are known to be visible on Little Tom, undoubtedly many are preserved deep within the sandstone layers on the property.

Little Tom overlooks glacial Lake Hitchcock, which was formed in the present Connecticut River basin as the retreating Laurentide ice sheet deposited sediments near Rocky Hill, Connecticut, damming the Connecticut River basin. Glacial meltwater filled Lake Hitchcock for over 4,000 years until about 14,000 years ago. Recent discoveries have placed early Native Americans just to the south of the glacial ice sheet 18,000 years ago. These peoples pushed north as the ice sheet retreated. They were ancestors of the Pocumtuck tribe, which lived and thrived in the Connecticut River Valley until the arrival of the Europeans. There is no known evidence of use of Little Tom by the Pocumtucks.

== History ==
In 2002, four entities joined together to acquire and protect the 396 acres on the eastern slope of Mt. Tom that had previously been home to the Mt. Tom ski area. This protection effort was led by the Department of Conservation and Recreation, and ultimately included the U.S. Fish and Wildlife Service, the Holyoke Boys & Girls Club, and The Trustees of Reservations. These 396 acres included the existing quarry site, which was slated to expand to 90 acres. The land transaction negotiations were lengthy and difficult, but were ultimately successful.

Each organization/agency purchased a portion of the property as follows:

Department of Conservation and Recreation (DCR) purchased 144.7 acres for $1.3 million, mostly along the northern side of the property abutting the existing Mount Tom State Reservation. The U.S. Fish and Wildlife Service acquired 140.8 acres for $1.1 million, covering most of the area previously managed for ski slopes.’ The Trustees purchased 73.5 acres of the hill called ‘Little Mountain’ or ‘Little Tom’, between the base lodge and I-91, for $300,000 and The Holyoke Boys & Girls Club purchased 21.7 acres at the base of the mountain, including the base lodges, wave pool, and other improvements, for $300,000 for use as a summer camp.

Also, the quarry operation was allowed to continue, but was contained within a nine-acre area. DCR received an option to purchase the quarry parcel, which totals 16 acres, on or after August 31, 2012 or after two million tons of stone were removed.

The four organizations have agreed to coordinate management of the 396 acres and will eventually develop a Memorandum of Understanding that outlines the management goals and responsibilities of the partnership. The Trustees and the Holyoke Boys and Girls Club run an environmental education program and manage the area together.

== Landscape ==
The Mt. Tom ridge is part of the Metacomet Range. The bedrock underlying these ridges resembles a layered cake of alternating layers of basalt and sandstone. The ridge adjacent to Mt. Tom to the SSW is called East Mountain. The line of ridges crosses the Connecticut River at the north end of Mt. Tom, and continues with a bend to the NE towards the Holyoke Range. East Mountain and the Holyoke Range share many of the interesting and significant geologic and biological characteristics that are described in this document.

The bulk of the Mt. Tom ridge consists of an exposed layer of basalt. From the air, the ridge looks like a vast, flat tabletop, leaning mostly to the east and a little to the south. The slopes of the former Mount Tom Ski Area, which are mostly on United States Fish and Wildlife Service land, descend this tilted tabletop roughly from west to east. The west edge of the Mt. Tom ridge is a sharp escarpment of cliffs and talus slopes. This feature gives rise to the common name traprock, which is derived from the Swedish word for step.

The Metacomet-Monadnock Trail follows the top edge of this escarpment, and has views toward the west. Away from the edge of the escarpment, the topography near the top of the main ridge is a landscape of small outcrops and ledges alternating with hollows, which sometimes hide vernal pools.

To the east, between Mt. Tom and I-91, there is a much smaller and somewhat more rounded version of the main ridge. It is named Little Mountain on the USGS topographic map and is also commonly called Little Tom Mountain. The traprock layer at the top of Little Tom Mountain is younger than the traprock layer that makes up the main slope of Mt. Tom and the sandstone layer in between these two layers subsides below the surface of Little Tom Mountain.

The former Mount Tom Ski Area property is a long trapezoid/rectangle, which begins at the top of the ridge at the west escarpment, descends the slopes of the main ridge, climbs over Little Tom Mountain, and ends close to I-91 at its eastern boundary. Within the parcel, DCR land is a fairly narrow strip along the northern parcel boundary, adjacent to the Mt. Tom State Reservation to the north. USFWS land is in the SW quadrant of the parcel, and covers most of the former ski slopes. The Trustees’ Little Tom Reservation is the northern half of Little Tom Mountain, of which the southern half is Department of Conservation and Recreation land. The quarry, which will continue its operation for several years, is west of Little Tom Mountain, at its base, and directly north of the Boys & Girls Club land.

With the exception of the ski slopes and a couple of small fields, most of the landscape is forested. The forest on the main ridge is mostly deciduous, and on Little Tom Mountain it is mostly a mixed forest of hemlock, hardwoods, and some white pine. The ski slopes and some fields are in a non-woody old-field condition and the old field next to “the billboard” (a billboard overlooking I-91 at the northeast corner of Trustees land) is dominated by red cedar, shrubs, saplings, and swallowwort.

The deciduous forests are for the most part typical, dry, fairly acidic, oak-dominated forests. Often they are relatively open forests, with a low, patchy canopy and an ericaceous shrub layer. Scattered along the main slope and in places on the southern end of the Little Tom Mountain ridgetop there are pockets of richer, more neutral soil, often associated with seeps, where a relatively sparse shrub layer and a more diverse ground cover of sedges, herbs, and ferns, and some rare plants occur – these are pleasant places to walk.

There are a dozen and a half vernal pools throughout the property, a reservoir, several ponds, a stream which flows down the main slope and then north into Lake Bray, a number of intermittent streams, and numerous seeps.

== Wildlife ==
Birds

United States Fish and Wildlife Service conducted a breeding land bird survey in 2003. A total of 75 species of birds were sighted on the property during the 2003 survey. An initial scouting survey conducted in May 2003 revealed that a great diversity of migratory songbirds use Mt. Tom for stopover habitat. Species sighted during that time include Blackburnian warbler, black-throated blue warbler, blue-winged warbler, northern parula, and yellow-rumped warbler. None of these species were counted during the landbird breeding survey. Early migratory stopover studies will be conducted by USFWS in subsequent years to further assess the use of Mt. Tom by neo-tropical migrants for stopover habitat.

Amphibians and reptiles

The Mount Tom ridge is an extremely important habitat for amphibians and reptiles. Thirty-eight species of amphibians and reptiles have been recorded on the Mount Tom ridge, representing 76% of all herpetological species found in Massachusetts. Of these, the rarest species include marbled salamander, box turtle, wood turtle, copperhead, timber rattlesnake, and Central ratsnake.

A vernal pool survey was conducted on three days in April 2003. Ten amphibian species were found, including four obligate vernal pool species, and two state-listed species. The most significant vernal pool is on top of Little Tom Mountain, on the Little Tom Reservation. It is an isolated pool, far from any neighbors, and as expected, a large number of spotted salamander and wood frog egg masses were found there. This vernal pool is a very significant ecological resource.

In the course of doing botanical survey work in 2003, box turtles, painted turtles, and black racers were found. Given anecdotal evidence, available habitats, and historical records, it is likely that the entire area of the Partners’ properties is used by northern copperheads and timber rattlesnakes. There is also the possibility of a few den sites of copperheads on the properties.

== Invasive species ==
The 2003 botanical survey included some effort to determine the status of invasive plant species in our properties. The following plant species list was compiled:

- Asiatic bittersweet
- Autumn olive
- Black locust
- Climbing nightshade
- Glossy buckthorn
- Japanese barberry
- Common barberry
- Japanese honeysuckle
- Morrow honeysuckle
- Japanese knotweed
- Multiflora rose
- Purple loosestrife
- Spotted knapweed
- Norway maple
- Northern catalpa

== Recreation ==
The Woodland Trail to Little Tom Mountain is open to the public, with access through Mount Tom State Reservation. Little Tom also has a hiking trail whereby the people from around there can assist in the trail.
