= WWOR =

WWOR can refer to:

- WWOR-TV, channel 9, a television station in Secaucus, New Jersey serving Greater New York City
- WWOR EMI Service, the national version of WWOR-TV available nationwide via cable and satellite from 1990 to 1996
- WHTT-FM, a radio station (104.1 FM) licensed to Buffalo, New York, which previously held the call sign WWOR
- WJZB-TV, on channel 14, a defunct television station in Worcester, Massachusetts that first signed on as WWOR-TV
