= WFXQ-CD =

WWLP translator in Springfield, Massachusetts

ATSC 3.0 station: Translator of WWLP, Springfield, Massachusetts

- Springfield–Holyoke, Massachusetts; United States
- City: Springfield, Massachusetts
- Channels: Digital: 21 (UHF); Virtual: 28
- Branding: see WWLP

Programming
- Affiliations: 28.1: NBC; 28.2: CW+

Ownership
- Owner: Nexstar Media Group; (Nexstar Media Inc.)
- Sister stations: see WWLP

History
- First air date: May 6, 1987
- Former call signs: W11BJ (1987–2004); W28CT (2004–February 2006); WXCW-CA (February−March 2006); WFXQ-CA (March 2006–2010)
- Former channel numbers: Analog: 11 (VHF, 1987–2006), 28 (UHF, 2006–2009); Digital: 28 (UHF, 2009–2019)
- Former affiliations: Independent (1987–2004) UPN (2004–2006, as repeater of WCTX)
- Call sign meaning: refers to unrealized Fox affiliation

Technical information
- Licensing authority: FCC
- Facility ID: 2650
- Class: CD
- ERP: 5 kW
- HAAT: 252.6 m (829 ft)
- Transmitter coordinates: 42°15′5.3″N 72°38′41.3″W

Links
- Public license information: Public file; LMS
- Website: www.wwlp.com

WFXQ-CD (channel 28) is a low-power, Class A television station in Springfield, Massachusetts, United States. It is a translator of dual NBC/CW+ affiliate WWLP (channel 22), owned by Nexstar Media Group. WFXQ-CD's transmitter is located at the old Mount Tom Ski Area summit in Holyoke. Its parent station maintains studios at Broadcast Center in the Sandy Hill section of Chicopee at the northwest corner of the I-391/MA 116/Chicopee Street interchange.

== History ==
The station first went on-the-air May 6, 1987, on VHF channel 11. Using the calls W11BJ, it originally aired a low-powered analog signal from the Rattlesnake Mountain transmitter site of Connecticut's Fox affiliate WTIC-TV (channel 61). The station was an independent that aired local shows to a senior retirement community in Farmington, Connecticut. It used a live skycam weather forecast which consisted of a character generator and a home video camera with shots of the window from the transmitter building. The owner of the station was the Chase family (who also owned WTIC-TV).

When LIN TV bought W11BJ in 2004, there was a construction permit approved to broadcast this station on UHF channel 28 from a new transmitter on Mount Tom in Holyoke. During the building of this transmitter, WWLP temporarily put on a simulcast of Connecticut's UPN affiliate WCTX (a sister station) through an off-air pickup. In early 2006, W28CT signed-on from the top of Mount Tom and the W11BJ transmitter on Rattlesnake Mountain was shut down. Right from the start, the station began to simulcast WWLP in a full-time manner. LIN TV had initially changed the call sign to WXCW-CA in reference to The CW in anticipation of it becoming an affiliate of that network. This affiliation eventually went to cable-only WB affiliate "WBQT".

As a result, the channel's call sign was changed again to WFXQ-CA referring to a possible Fox affiliation. This caused rumors on several television industry message boards that it would become an affiliate of that network. Speculation also existed that WFXQ might affiliate with Fox's new sister network, MyNetworkTV. At the time, cable television viewers in the Springfield–Holyoke market received Fox from WTIC-TV and the network's owned-and-operated station in Boston, WFXT, with MyNetworkTV coming from WCTX.

On November 16, 2007, the Springfield Republican reported that ABC affiliate WGGB-TV would be launching a Fox affiliate on a new second subchannel which was expected to launch at the end of that year. This was ultimately delayed until the end of March 2008 when the new service took on a primary Fox and secondary MyNetworkTV affiliation. Up to that time, Springfield held the distinction of being the largest television market without a Fox affiliate of its own.

Until December 9, 2008, WFXQ's analog signal transmitted on the same frequency as CW affiliate WLWC in Providence, Rhode Island. After the Federal Communications Commission (FCC) approved a construction permit, the station "flash-cut" to digital sometime after June 12, 2009, although, at the time, the station was still assigned a "-CA" suffix. Eventually, the FCC updated its listing and this channel began using the WFXQ-CD calls. Since that point it has mainly served as a local UHF translator of WWLP for the central part of the Springfield market, including Northampton, Easthampton, and Holyoke, and most of Springfield.

On March 21, 2014, Media General announced that it would purchase LIN Media and its stations, including WWLP and WFXQ-CD, in a $1.6 billion merger. The merger was completed on December 19.

On January 1, 2015, WWLP began to carry what had been the cable-exclusive CW affiliate WBQT as their second digital subchannel, which also applied to WFXQ-CD's second subchannel, finally fulfilling the original purpose of LIN's purchase of the station.

On September 8, 2015, Media General announced that it would acquire the Meredith Corporation for $2.4 billion, with the combined group to be renamed Meredith Media General once the sale is finalized. Because Meredith already owns WGGB-TV, and the Springfield-Holyoke market does not have enough full-power television stations to legally allow a duopoly in any event (WGGB and WWLP are the only full-power licenses assigned to the market), the companies would have been required to sell either WGGB or WWLP to comply with FCC ownership rules as well as recent changes to those rules regarding same-market television stations that restrict sharing agreements. Meredith-owned CBS affiliate WSHM-LD (channel 3) is the only one of the three stations affected by the merger that could legally be acquired by Meredith Media General, as FCC rules permit common ownership of full-power and low-power stations regardless of the number of stations within a single market. On January 27, 2016, however, Nexstar Broadcasting Group announced that it had reached an agreement to acquire Media General, who subsequently abandoned its plans to purchase Meredith.

== Subchannels ==
The station's signal is multiplexed:

Subchannels of WFXQ-CD
Channel	Res.	Short name	Programming
28.1	1080i	WFXQNBC	NBC
28.2	1080i	WFXQCW	The CW Plus
