= Mount Nonotuck =

Mountain in Massachusetts, United States

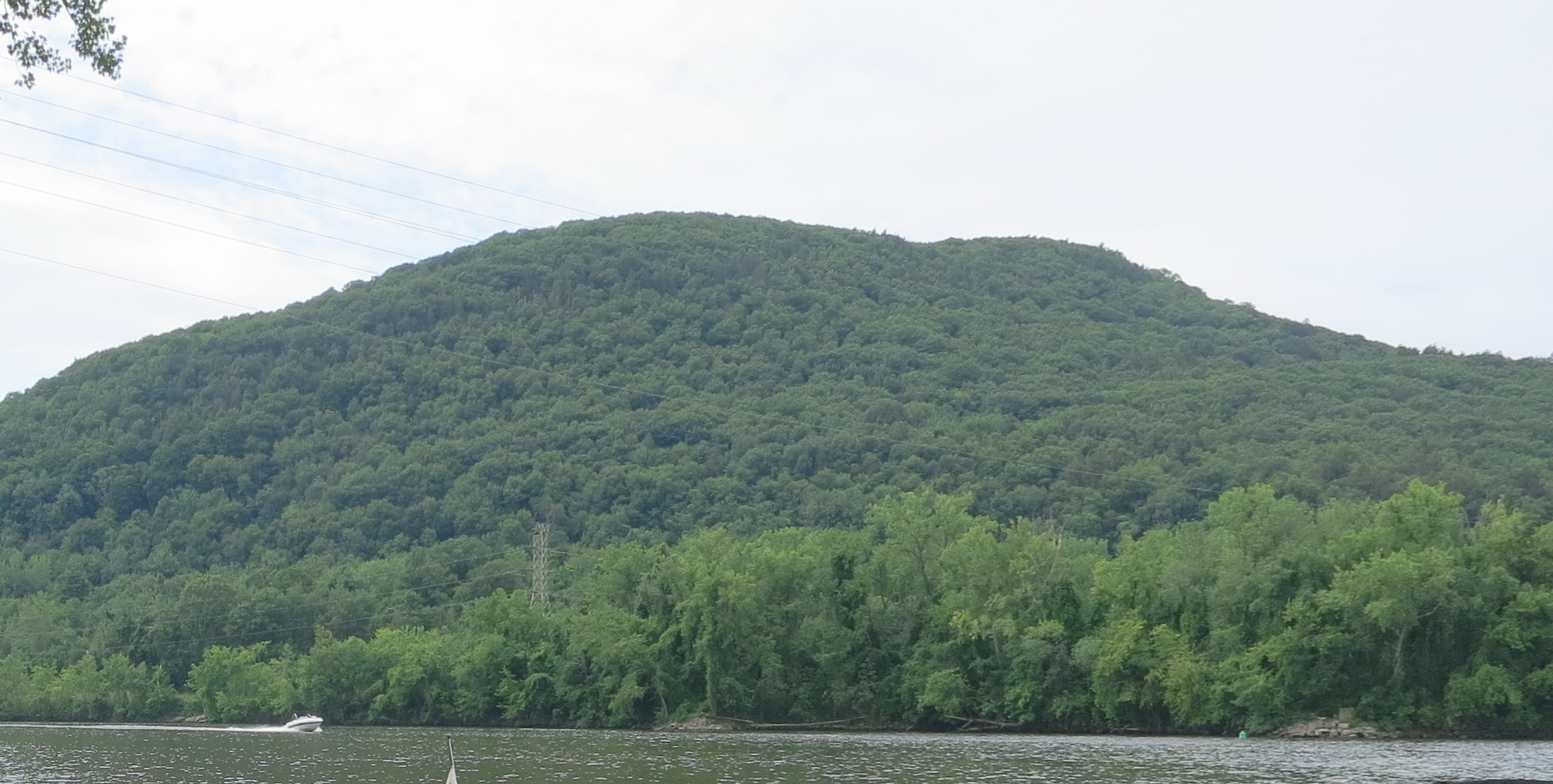
- The northern portion of the Mount Tom Range, with Mount Nonotuck visible to the right

Highest point
- Elevation: 827 ft (252 m)
- Coordinates: 42°16′48″N 72°37′13″W

Geography
- Location: Holyoke, Massachusetts
- Parent range: Mount Tom Range / Metacomet Ridge

Geology
- Rock age: 200 Ma
- Mountain type: fault-block igneous

Climbing
- Easiest route: Auto road

Mount Nonotuck, 827 feet (252 m), is the northernmost peak of the Mount Tom Range of traprock mountains located in the Connecticut River Valley of Massachusetts and part of the larger Metacomet Ridge which stretches from Long Island Sound to nearly the Vermont border. Rugged and considered scenic, the peak rises steeply from the river valley 700 feet (210 m) below. It is located within the town of Holyoke.

The 110-mile (180 km) Metacomet-Monadnock Trail, maintained by the Berkshire Chapter of the Appalachian Mountain Club, crosses Mt. Nonotuck, and a seasonal auto road (closed to vehicles indefinitely due to deteriorating conditions, hikers still welcome) climbs to a small parking lot just beneath the summit. During the winter, the auto road is often used for cross country skiing.

== History ==
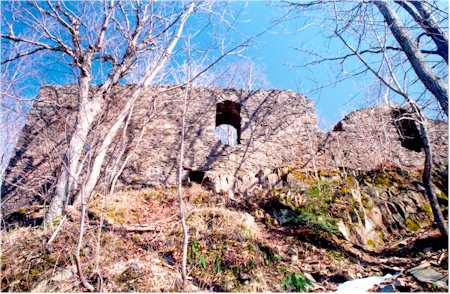
Eyrie House ruins, 2003

In 1861, following the success of the hotel on the summit of Mount Holyoke across the river, William Street opened a summit hotel on Mount Nonotuck and named it Eyrie House. The hotel was closer to the Connecticut River and therefore more accessible than the hotel on Mount Holyoke, which spurred the owners of the latter establishment to build a rail line and a ferry dock from the river to the base of Mount Holyoke. The hotel burned down in 1901 when Street attempted to cremate two horses on the mountain and lost control of the fire, leaving only the cellar holes and the walls of the stone understory standing. The hotel was subsequently included in the Mount Tom Reservation managed by the Commonwealth of Massachusetts. The Connecticut River Oxbow (now a lake), immortalized by the famous landscape painter Thomas Cole just before natural flooding and erosion separated it from the Connecticut River, is visible from the ruins.

== Geology and ecology ==
Mount Nonotuck, like much of the Metacomet Ridge, is composed of basalt, also called traprock, a volcanic rock. The mountain formed near the end of the Triassic Period with the rifting apart of the North American continent from Africa and Eurasia. Lava welled up from the rift and solidified into sheets of strata hundreds of feet thick. Subsequent faulting and earthquake activity tilted the strata, creating the cliffs and ridges of Mount Nonotuck. Hot, dry upper slopes, cool, moist ravines, and mineral-rich ledges of basalt talus produce a combination of microclimate ecosystems on the mountain that support plant and animal species uncommon in greater Massachusetts. (See Metacomet Ridge for more information on the geology and ecosystem of Mount Nonotuck).

== See also ==
- Mount Tom Range
- Metacomet-Monadnock Trail
- Metacomet Ridge
