= WWLP =

Television station in Springfield, Massachusetts

- Springfield–Holyoke, Massachusetts; United States
- City: Springfield, Massachusetts
- Channels: Digital: 11 (VHF); Virtual: 22
- Branding: 22 News; The CW Springfield (on DT2)

Programming
- Affiliations: 22.1: NBC; 22.2: CW+; for others, see § Subchannels

Ownership
- Owner: Nexstar Media Group; (Nexstar Media Inc.)

History
- First air date: March 17, 1953
- Former channel numbers: Analog: 61 (UHF, 1953–1955), 22 (UHF, 1955–2009); Former satellites: 32 WRLP Greenfield (1957–1978); 14 WWOR-TV/WJZB-TV Worcester (1958–1969)
- Call sign meaning: William L. Putnam (the station's founder and longtime owner)

Technical information
- Licensing authority: FCC
- Facility ID: 6868
- ERP: 15.8 kW
- HAAT: 247 m (810 ft)
- Transmitter coordinates: 42°5′5″N 72°42′12″W
- Translator(s): 28 WFXQ-CD (UHF)

Links
- Public license information: Public file; LMS
- Website: www.wwlp.com

WWLP (channel 22) is a television station in Springfield, Massachusetts, United States, affiliated with NBC. Its second digital subchannel serves as an owned-and-operated station of The CW (via The CW Plus). Owned by Nexstar Media Group (majority owner of The CW), the station has studios at Broadcast Center in the Sandy Hill section of Chicopee at the northwest corner of the I-391/MA 116/Chicopee Street interchange, and its transmitter is located on Provin Mountain in the Feeding Hills section of Agawam.

WWLP operates a full-time low-power digital repeater, WFXQ-CD (channel 28), whose transmitter is located at the top of the old Mount Tom Ski Area in Holyoke. WFXQ-CD primarily serves as a way for the few viewers in the core of the Springfield market without cable or satellite to have UHF access to WWLP's signal, as VHF antennas have some issues with reception in the digital age. As with all other Springfield stations carried on UHF channels, it allows those viewers to use one type of antenna rather than two.

Due to the close proximity of the Springfield–Holyoke and Hartford–New Haven, Connecticut markets, many stations in Connecticut can be viewed in the Southern Pioneer Valley. Since WWLP's transmitter on Provin Mountain is not far from the state line, its signal can be picked up in northern areas of the state. WVIT (channel 30), which serves as the NBC station for all of Connecticut except Fairfield County (which is served by network flagship WNBC in New York City), is currently the only Hartford–New Haven big three station offered on Comcast Xfinity's basic tier. Charter Spectrum customers in the Pioneer Valley have access to WVIT, but only with a digital set top box.

WWLP's facility additionally serves as Nexstar's Northeast master control hub.

== History ==
A promotional photo of WWLP's Springfield studios in 1960, featuring local businessman Carlton Nash and several dinosaur track specimens found on his property in South Hadley

WWLP began broadcasting on March 17, 1953, one month before rival WHYN-TV (now WGGB-TV). The station aired an analog signal on UHF channel 61 and was an NBC affiliate from the start. At its sign-on, WWLP had the distinction of being one of the first UHF television stations in the United States after the Federal Communications Commission (FCC) opened the UHF band as well as Massachusetts' oldest station outside of Boston. It was founded by William L. Putnam and his company, Springfield Television. WWLP's original studios were at the transmitter site on Provin Mountain in Feeding Hills.

It switched frequencies to UHF channel 22 on July 2, 1955. The previous analog allotment would remain unused until the second WTIC-TV signed on from Hartford in 1984. From its beginnings, the Springfield–Holyoke market was designated as a "UHF island" where no analog VHF stations could be allocated. Springfield was sandwiched between Boston to the east, Hartford–New Haven to the south, and the Capital District of New York State to the west, and all available VHF channels were tied up between them. As a result of technical limitations UHF stations faced in the 1950s, as well as the market's rugged terrain, WWLP's signal was not viewable in much of the northern portion of the market (which at the time included Brattleboro, Vermont, and Keene, New Hampshire). The station would sign on two full-time satellites to solve that problem and extend its broadcasting radius (see below). WWLP was also at a disadvantage in its early years, as UHF stations could not be viewed without the use of an expensive external converter that received UHF signals (it wasn't until the passing of the All-Channel Receiver Act in 1962 that all TVs were required to have them built in). From 1975 until 1979, the station aired nationally syndicated National Hockey League games from The NHL Network (not to be confused with the present-day cable channel of the same name).

After three decades, Putnam retired from broadcasting in 1984 and sold his company and its three stations (WWLP, KSTU-TV, and WKEF) to Adams Communications. Adams ran into financial trouble and began breaking up the Springfield Television group in 1987 with the sale of KSTU to MWT Ltd. Adams sold WKEF to KT Communications in 1989 before selling WWLP to Brisette Broadcasting in 1991. However, Brisette himself ran into trouble and merged his group with Benedek Broadcasting at the end of 1995. LIN TV Corporation acquired WWLP in 2000 by swapping KAKE-TV in Wichita, Kansas, and WOWT-TV in Omaha, Nebraska, to Benedek. This was a result of Chronicle Broadcasting, which owned the latter two, being liquidated. The sale could be seen as the ultimate undoing for Benedek which in 2002 declared bankruptcy and sold most of their stations (including WOWT and KAKE) to Gray Television (who now owns rival station WGGB-TV).

In early 2000, the station's studios and offices moved to their current home in the Sandy Hill area of Chicopee. However, its transmitter remained in Feeding Hills. Shortly after the change, then-pending owner LIN TV constructed an addition at WWLP's new facilities which would serve as a master control hub for company-owned stations in the Northeast. At this location, room for future expansion was made in the event LIN TV expanded their Northeast properties. That eventually became the case with sister stations WTNH, WCTX, WPRI-TV (LIN TV flagship), and WNAC-TV having master control and some internal operations currently located at the Chicopee studios.

WWLP was well known for producing As Schools Match Wits, one of American television's earliest and longest-running high school quiz programs. The program first aired in October 1961. In September 2006, the show was canceled by the station because of the costs associated with new FCC regulations requiring all over-the-air television programming in the United States to be closed-captioned for the deaf and hard of hearing. The show returned to the air in January 2007, airing now on the area's PBS member station WGBY-TV (channel 57) and co-produced with Westfield State College.

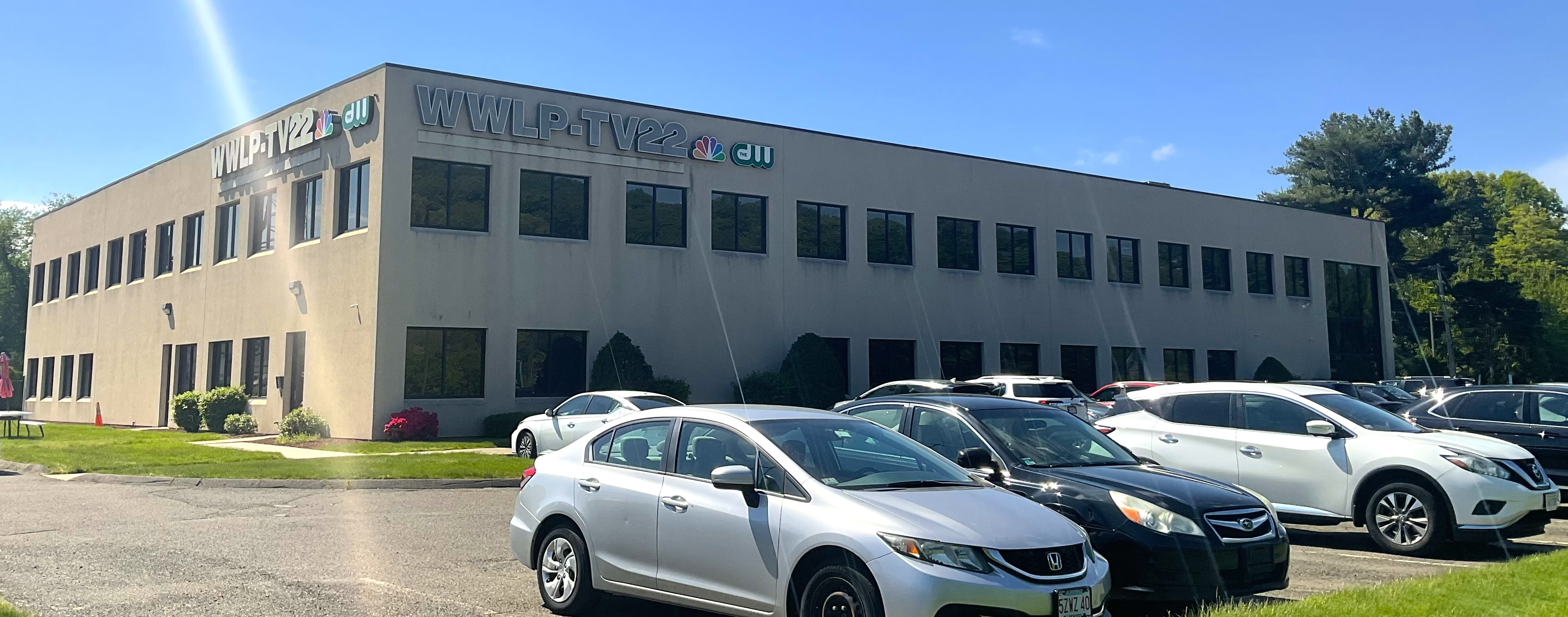
WWLP's studios in Chicopee, located southwest of the junction of the Mass Pike and I-391.

On May 18, 2007, LIN TV announced that it was exploring strategic alternatives including the sale of the company. On March 21, 2014, Media General announced that it would purchase LIN Media and its stations, including WWLP and WFXQ-CD, in a $1.6 billion merger. The merger was completed on December 19.

On September 8, 2015, Media General announced that it would acquire the Meredith Corporation for $2.4 billion, with the combined group to be renamed Meredith Media General once the sale was finalized. Because Meredith already owned WGGB-TV, and the Springfield–Holyoke market does not have enough full-power television stations to legally allow a duopoly in any event (the Pioneer Valley has only three full-power TV stations), the companies would have been required to sell either WGGB-TV or WWLP to comply with FCC ownership rules as well as recent changes to those rules regarding same-market television stations that restrict sharing agreements had the sale gone through. Meredith-owned CBS affiliate WSHM-LD (channel 3) was the only one of the three stations affected by the merger that could legally be acquired by Meredith Media General, as FCC rules permit common ownership of full-power and low-power stations regardless of the number of stations within a single market. On January 27, 2016, however, Nexstar Broadcasting Group announced that it had reached an agreement to acquire Media General, who subsequently abandoned its plans to purchase Meredith.

=== Former satellites ===
In 1957, WRLP in Greenfield signed on as a full-time satellite of WWLP. WRLP served the northern portion of the Pioneer Valley market, where WWLP's signal was marginal at best due to the area's rugged and mountainous terrain. From a transmitter on Gunn Mountain in Winchester, New Hampshire (one of the highest points in the region), WRLP could also be seen in Springfield as well, creating a strong combined signal with over 50 percent overlap.

In 1958, Putnam purchased a defunct station in Worcester, WWOR-TV (no relation to the current Secaucus, New Jersey/Tri-State station with the same callsign), and returned it to the air as a second full-time satellite of WWLP. However, Worcester is part of the Boston market, and WWLP was forced to limit WWOR's broadcast day to only six hours in order to protect the interests of WBZ-TV, then Boston's NBC affiliate. In 1964, WWOR changed its calls to WJZB-TV and became an independent station while continuing to simulcast some programming from WWLP.

WRLP and WJZB eventually went off the air due to financial difficulties, with WJZB going dark in 1969 followed by WRLP in 1978. Almost immediately after WRLP left the air, its transmitter was shipped to Salt Lake City, Utah, in order to launch KSTU, an independent sister station on UHF channel 20. That station eventually became a Fox affiliate on analog VHF channel 13 operating under a different owner.

== Subchannels ==
=== WWLP-DT2 (The CW) ===
WWLP-DT2, branded The CW Springfield, is the CW+-affiliated second digital subchannel of WWLP, broadcasting in 720p high definition on channel 22.2. On cable, the subchannel is available on Xfinity channel 5 and Spectrum channel 13 to viewers in Hampden, Hampshire, and Franklin counties.

==== As cable-only WBQT ====
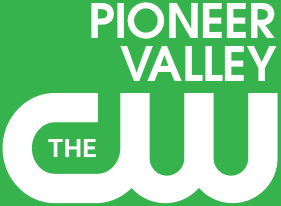
WWLP-DT2's former logo as a cable-only CW affiliate.

What is now WWLP-DT2 began its life in September 1998 as WBQT, a cable-only affiliate of The WB through the national WB 100+ service. Since it was only available on cable, the call sign was fictional in nature solely for the purposes of electronic program guide and rating diary identification, and thus not officially recognized by the FCC. As a WB 100+ station, it was one of the few in the group that was not aligned with an established over-the-air station in the market. WBQT did not initially replace out-of-market WB affiliates (such as WPIX from New York City, WBNE from Hartford, which was later replaced with WTXX, and WLVI from Boston) on local cable systems.

In 1999, WBQT was taken off of AT&T Broadband systems serving the majority of the Springfield–Holyoke market. When Comcast took over AT&T's cable system in 2001, the company began a push to expand WBQT's reach. In late 2001, it replaced out-of-market WB affiliates on most systems with near total replacement taking place by 2003 (mainly taking the cable channel positions formerly held by WTXX, following a pattern where WSHM-LP replaced Hartford CBS affiliate WFSB on channel 3 and new Fox affiliate WGGB-DT2 replaced WTIC-TV on channel 6 in the Springfield market upon their launches). Throughout the station's affiliation with The WB, it was known on-air as Pioneer Valley's WB 16 (named after its channel location) and had its own logo.

On January 24, 2006, The WB and UPN announced the two networks would shut down and merge into a new network, The CW. The next few months saw uncertainty about The CW's place in Springfield due to a lack of broadcast stations in the market and The CW's preference for over-the-air affiliates, along with cable providers then not being receptive to picking up digital subchannels. UPN service was provided by New Haven's WCTX via cable in the Springfield market, but WTXX, being Tribune-owned, was named a charter affiliate in The CW's launch announcement, shutting out WCTX from the CW affiliation entirely. As WBQT had no web presence or communications department as a WB 100+ affiliate, there was no word about it becoming the Springfield affiliate for The CW, nor of a return of WTXX to market cable systems.

There was an early-2006 sign-on of low-powered W28CT broadcasting from the summit of the old Mount Tom Ski Area in Holyoke. After a short period of time, the station's call letters were changed to WXCW-CA in anticipation of it becoming an affiliate of that network. In August 2006, the call letters changed again to WFXQ-CA after word was confirmed that WBQT would continue operations as Springfield's CW affiliate. The station (now WFXQ-CD) eventually became a full-time repeater of WWLP.

As it joined The CW, WBQT also became part of The CW Plus, a similar operation to The WB 100+. The station began airing promotions of the new network, with WBQT's branding becoming Pioneer Valley CW. The network launched on September 18 with proper on-air changes on WBQT, along with a website on The CW Plus's web presence with schedule information. It branded solely by its listed branding, discounting its varied market channel positions (Comcast 16 and Charter 13). During its cable-exclusive period with The WB and The CW, the station did not have an actual owner and had a signal provided to cable companies through a closed circuit satellite feed.

==== As WWLP-DT2 ====
WWLP-DT2 originally signed on in 2007, airing a live feed of its weather radar, with no background audio. As a byproduct of an affiliation agreement between LIN TV and TheCoolTV to carry the music video network on LIN's stations, WWLP affiliated with the network on its second digital subchannel in 2010. The network was dropped on July 15, 2013, with the subchannel remaining dark for the next 20 months.

On December 23, 2014, as part of a long-term affiliation renewal with the network, Media General announced that WWLP and WFXQ-CD would affiliate their respective second digital subchannels with The CW, allowing the former cable-exclusive "WBQT" channel serving the market to have an over-the-air presence. On January 1, 2015, WWLP took over promotional and advertising responsibilities of WBQT from the area's cable companies. As a result, the service was added to the second subchannel of WWLP in order to offer over-the-air viewers access to The CW for the first time. The main station launched a prime time newscast at 10 p.m. on the CW subchannel on April 13, 2015. It also started replaying WWLP's weekday morning lifestyle show, Mass Appeal, at 1 p.m., and as of April 1, WBQT Pioneer Valley CW was re-branded as The CW Springfield as well. The previous WXCW call letters were unavailable, having been taken by a Fort Myers, Florida CW affiliate in 2007.

Xfinity began carrying the subchannel's high definition feed on digital channel 820 on April 1, 2015, with Charter adding the feed on digital channel 788 in mid-April 2015 (for viewers in Hampden, Hampshire, and Franklin counties), making CW programming available in HD in the Pioneer Valley for the first time.

=== WWLP-DT3 (Ion Television) ===
WWLP-DT3 is the Ion Television-affiliated third digital subchannel of WWLP, broadcasting in standard definition on channel 22.3.

On November 5, 2015, WWLP soft-launched a standard definition feed of Ion Television's main signal over subchannel 22.3 as part of Media General's carriage agreement of the network in markets without a dedicated Ion affiliate. New London, Connecticut-based WHPX-TV has served as the market's nominal affiliate for years with some cable coverage; until its move to a tower in Farmington in 2019, it transmitted from Montville closer to New London in southeastern Connecticut, assuring poor overall Pioneer Valley reception, thus the national feed has mainly been offered by local providers who carry the network.

== Berkshire County feed/22 News Plus ==
In April 2017, Charter Communications was forced to drop WWLP in Berkshire County, due to new terms in NBC's retransmission consent agreements which require that only the station assigned to that community can be carried on a cable system. As Berkshire County is a part of the Albany–Schenectady–Troy, New York media market, Charter was thus required to black out WWLP's non-local programming in preference to Albany's WNYT (channel 13); the provider thus chose to drop fully WWLP instead in order to reduce the hassle of maintaining a 'clean feed' of WWLP on its own. Other Springfield stations, along with Boston's WCVB-TV, were also dropped due to the same concerns.

Because of this, viewers in Berkshire County had little to no access to Massachusetts-specific news on their cable systems outside of the regional cable news channel, NECN, and complained to their government representatives, including the state's congressional delegation, to restore some kind of access to stations in their own state. The offices of Senators Elizabeth Warren and Ed Markey, along with Congressman Richard E. Neal, pressured Charter and WWLP's owner, Nexstar, to restore the station's newscasts in some manner. This came at the end of February 2020, when Nexstar and Charter announced they would authorize a return of WWLP to Berkshire County systems, which was launched on March 31, 2020, on SD channels 14/16 (dependent on location), and 1204 in HD. Charter had also launched a local branch of their regional cable news channel, Spectrum News, early in 2020, in order to address the issues brought up by Berkshire residents.

Nexstar provides the secondary feed to Spectrum for those systems, and it features only WWLP's newscasts and other local programming without any of the station's syndicated and NBC programming, nor WWLP's subchannels; during network and syndicated programming times, repeats of that programming, including WWLP newscasts and NewsNation programming, are seen instead. The same feed was made available in 2025, both throughout the Springfield market and nationwide (with sign-in) through WWLP's streaming platform known as "22 News Plus" via mobile and digital media player apps and website access.

== Programming ==
=== Local programming ===
WWLP serves as the western Massachusetts affiliate for the New England Patriots' preseason television network, carrying the team's games not nationally broadcast.

=== News operation ===
Ever since its sign-on, WWLP has consistently had the most watched newscasts in the Pioneer Valley. This has been achieved (most of the time) by beating rival ABC affiliate WGGB-TV (channel 40) in the local Nielsen ratings since both stations went on-the-air. There have been brief periods of time when WGGB was the market leader and extended periods in which the two outlets were essentially neck-and-neck with WWLP having a slight edge. However, WWLP consistently outpaced WGGB after Sinclair Broadcast Group acquired that station in 1998 and drastically cut its news operation.

While operating as full-time satellites of WWLP, WRLP and WWOR/WJZB simulcasted local news from this station. However, when WRLP converted to a separate Independent channel in 1974, its own newscasts were established tailored toward the Northern Pioneer Valley as well as Brattleboro and Keene.

After WGGB-TV recently became locally owned (bought by John J. Gormally who publishes the Business West magazine), there was a chance the ratings could change. However, as of the July 2008 sweeps period, WWLP continues its longtime dominance with WGGB stabilizing to a strong second. Although low-powered CBS affiliate WSHM-LP established its own news department in October 2005, it initially did not compete on the same level as WWLP and WGGB. However, its ratings grew substantially across the board during the May 2009 sweeps period to within decimal points of WGGB-TV in several key demographics.

In addition to their main studios, WWLP operates a Hampshire County Bureau on Main Street/MA 9/MA 10 in downtown Northampton as part of Thornes Market (location established in November 2010), and a Franklin County Bureau in Greenfield. NBC O&O WBTS-CD, along with NECN in Boston, share their resources with WWLP for news coverage of Eastern Massachusetts. In turn, WWLP does the same for events from western areas of the state. Although it operates its own weather radar at the transmitter site on Provin Mountain, it is not seen on-air or online. During weather segments, the station does feature live NOAA National Weather Service radar data from several regional sites presented on-screen in a system known as "ESP: Live Doppler" (with "ESP" meaning Exclusive Storm Prediction). The station uses the "Tower V.4" news music package from 615 Music. The station's anchors dually serve as field reporters outside of their anchoring assignments.

On January 8, 2012, WWLP became the second station in the Springfield/Holyoke market to broadcast local news in high definition. Rival station WGGB-TV was the first to broadcast in HD in September 2011. The April 2015 move of The CW to WWLP-DT2 saw the station launch a half-hour 10 p.m. newscast, competing with WGGB's Fox subchannel in the timeslot.

=== Notable former on-air staff ===
- Todd Gross
- Rob Morrison
- Bill Rasmussen
- Anaridis Rodriguez

== Technical information ==
=== Subchannels ===
The station's signal is multiplexed:

Subchannels of WWLP
Channel	Res.	Short name	Programming
22.1	1080i	WWLP-DT	NBC
22.2	720p	WWLP-CW	The CW Plus
22.3	480i	WWLP-IO	Ion (4:3)
22.4	480i	WWLP-MY	Ion Mystery (4:3)

=== Analog-to-digital conversion ===
WWLP discontinued regular programming on its analog signal, over UHF channel 22, on February 17, 2009, the original target date on which full-power television stations in the United States were to transition from analog to digital broadcasts under federal mandate (but was ordered by the FCC to continue transmitting emergency bulletins, local news broadcasts, and information on digital transition on its analog channel for an additional sixty days as part of the "nightlighting" service; the target date was moved to June 12). The station's digital signal remained on its pre-transition VHF channel 11, using virtual channel 22.
