= Mount Tom Range =

Traprock mountain range in Massachusetts, U.S.

- Metacomet Ridge
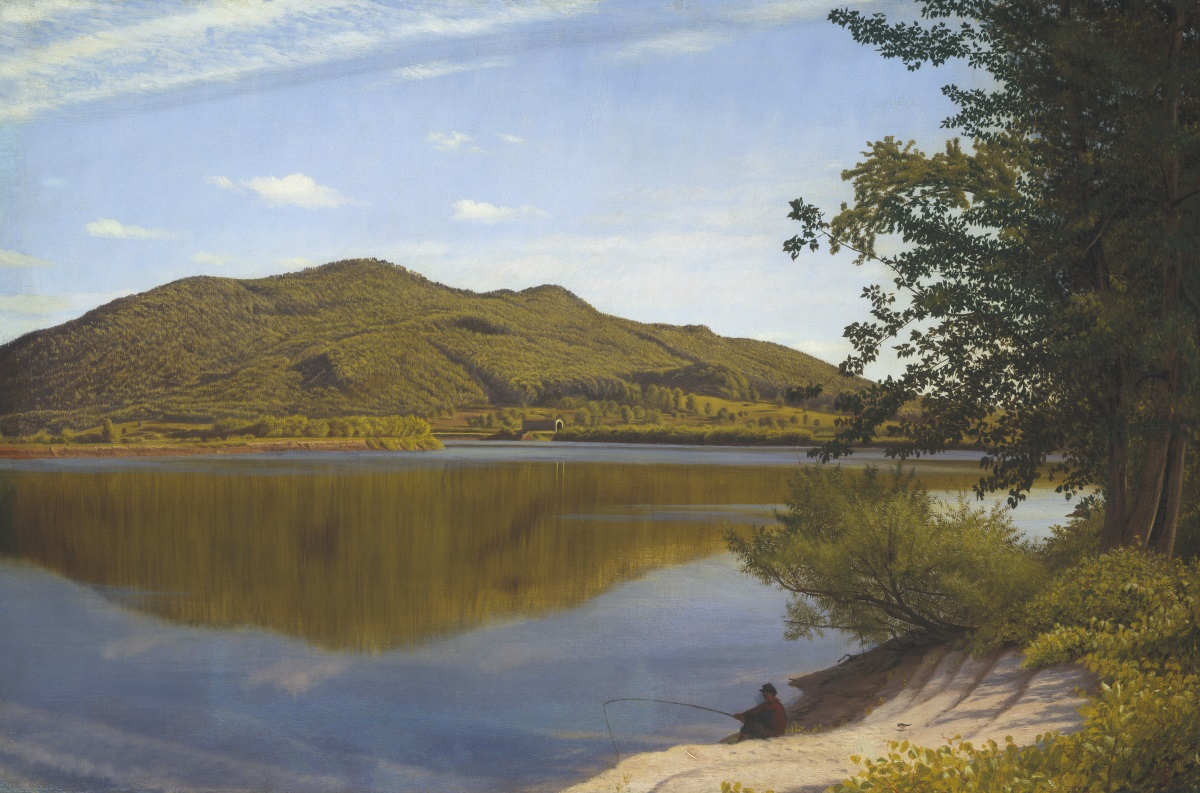
- The range's peaks depicted in an 1865 painting by Thomas Charles Farrer (1839–1891), oil on canvas

Highest point
- Peak: Mount Tom
- Elevation: 1,202 ft (366 m)
- Coordinates: 42°14′30″N 72°38′53″W

Dimensions
- Length: 4.5 mi (7.2 km) east-west

Geography
- Location within Massachusetts
- Country: United States
- State: Massachusetts

Geology
- Rock ages: Triassic and Jurassic
- Rock types: fault-block, igneous and sedimentary

The Mount Tom Range is a traprock mountain range located in the Connecticut River Valley of Massachusetts. It is a subrange of the Appalachians and part of the Metacomet Ridge that extends from Long Island Sound near New Haven, Connecticut, north through the Connecticut River Valley of Massachusetts to nearly the Vermont border. A popular outdoor recreation resource, the range is known for its continuous west facing cliffs and its rugged, scenic character. It is also notable for its unique microclimate ecosystems and rare plant communities, as well as significant historic sites, such as the ruins of the 18th century Eyrie House located on Mount Nonotuck.

== Geography ==
The Mount Tom Range rises steeply between 500 and 1,100 feet (150 and 340 m) above the Connecticut River Valley below; it is roughly 4.5 miles (7 km) long by 1.5 miles (2.4 km) wide at its widest point, although the ruggedness of the terrain makes the actual area much larger.

Topographic map of the Mount Tom Range

Peaks
Name	Height above sea level		Notes
Name	ft	m	Notes
Mount Tom (summit)	1,202	366	the high point of range with west-facing cliffs up to 400 feet (120 m)
Deadtop	1,115	340	
Whiting Peak	1,014	309	
Goat Peak	822	251	location of raptor observation platform
Dry Knoll	835	255	
Mount Nonotuck	827	252	location of historic Eyrie House ruins
Little Mount Tom	631	192	a wooded hill on the southeast side of the range, recently conserved by The Trustees of Reservations

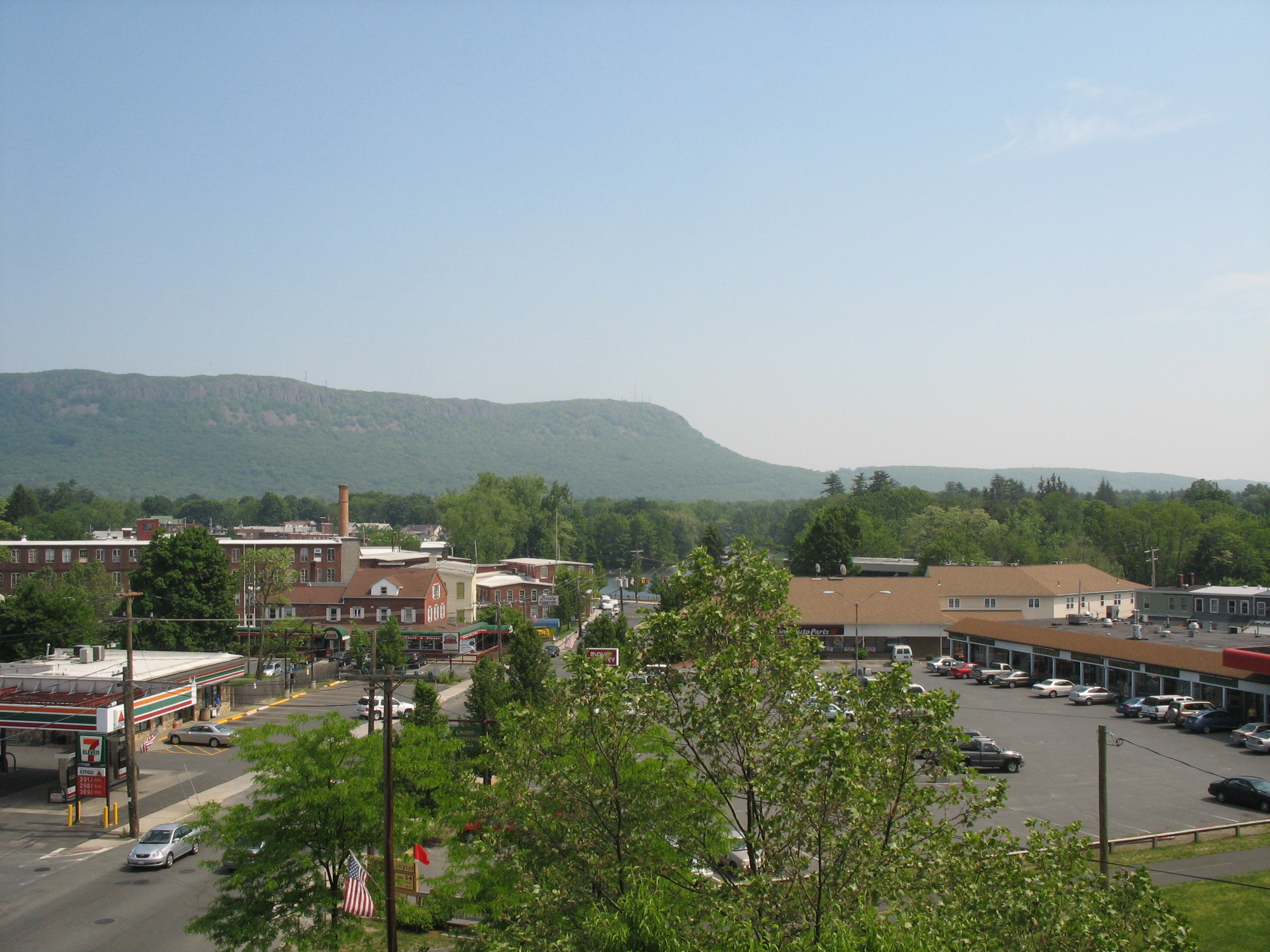
Mount Tom Range from Easthampton

The entire range is sometimes referred to as "Mount Tom". Oriented from south to north, the range is located within the towns of Easthampton and Holyoke.

The Metacomet Ridge continues south from the Mount Tom Range as East Mountain and east across the Connecticut River as the Holyoke Range. The Metacomet Ridge is broken to the north; the Mount Tom Range is separated from the Pocumtuck Ridge, 9 miles (14 km) away by a relatively low-lying area punctuated with occasional rises. The east side of the range drains into the Connecticut River thence to Long Island Sound; the west side drains into the Manhan River, thence to the Connecticut River.

== History ==
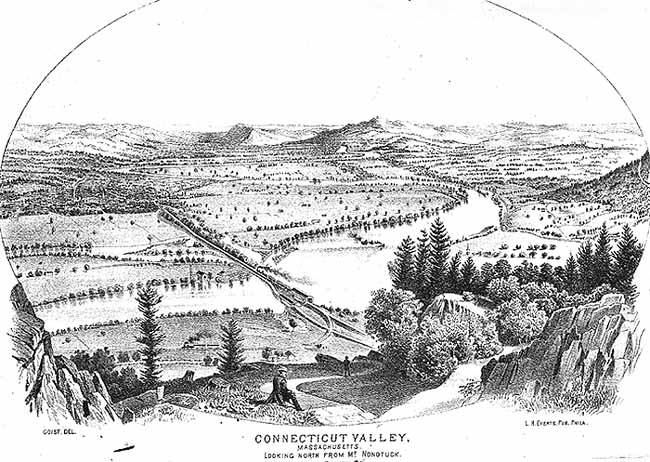
View from Mount Nonotuck. From "History of the Connecticut Valley, Massachusetts Vol 1" 1879, by Louis Everts

According to popular folklore, Mount Tom (the high point on the range) takes its name from Rowland Thomas, a surveyor who worked for the settlement of Springfield, Massachusetts in the 1660s. Thomas supposedly named Mount Tom after himself while his fellow surveyor working on the opposite side of the Connecticut River, Elizur Holyoke, gave his name to Mount Holyoke. Before the mid-19th century, very little history had been recorded about the Mount Tom Range to distinguish it from the surrounding landscape. Native Americans inhabited the area around the Mount Tom Range for at least 10,000 years; they grew maize, tobacco, beans, squash and other vegetables in the Connecticut River floodplain, clearing small sections of forest by burning to make room for their crops. They hunted and fished in the area, and made tools and arrowheads from the basalt rock of the Metacomet Ridge. Tensions between the local Pocumtuc Native American tribe and colonial settlers, who began arriving in the region in the mid-17th century, reached a head in 1675 with the outbreak of King Philip's War, a conflict involving colonists and a confederacy of Native American tribes across southern New England under the leadership of the sachem Metacomet. More settlers arrived after of the war ended with the defeat of the Native Americans, and by the early 19th century, most of the region's current towns had been established and most of the land had been cleared of trees to make room for farms. Farmers were particularly attracted to the rich soils of the region—one of the few places in New England where tobacco can grown with commercial success. Rugged highlands, such as the Holyoke Range and Mount Tom Range, although unsuitable for farming, were often harvested of timber to produce charcoal, a primary source of fuel for the steel industry prior to the extraction of coal in the mid-Appalachians.

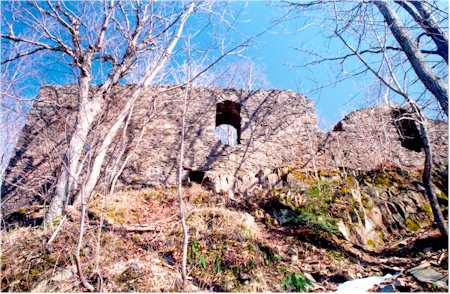
Ruins of Eyrie House, 2003

Highland areas were also burned of timber when lowland fires, set to clear land for farms, raged out of control. However, by the early 20th century, after agricultural interests shifted west and charcoaling became unprofitable, rural New England became largely forested again. A 2004 ecological resource study conducted for the National Park Service suggests that the Metacomet Ridge may have remained more or less forested (cleared only intermittently) throughout New England's agricultural period, thereby allowing the area to retain its biologic diversity through the 20th century.

Increasing urbanization and industrialization in 19th century New England resulted in an opposing aesthetic transcendentalist movement characterized by the paintings of the Hudson River School of American landscape painters such as Frederic Edwin Church and Thomas Cole (who, in 1836, famously painted the Connecticut River from sketches he made from the summit of Mount Holyoke), the work of landscape architects such as Frederick Law Olmsted, and the writings of philosophers like Henry David Thoreau and Ralph Waldo Emerson. This philosophical, artistic, and environmental movement transformed many areas of the Metacomet Ridge (as well as other places in New England) from a commercial resource to a recreational and aesthetic resource. Hotels, parks, and summer estates were built on the mountains from the mid-1880s to the early 20th century.

=== Early tourism and conservation ===
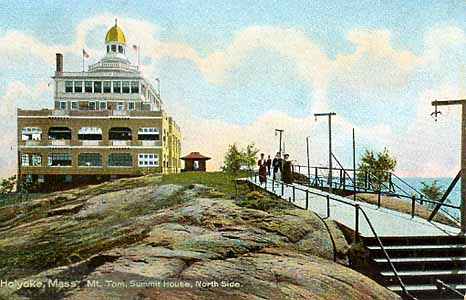
The Mount Tom Summit House. Postcard dated 1898–1900.

In 1861, following the success of the hotel on the summit of Mount Holyoke across the river, William Street opened a summit hotel on Mount Nonotuck and named it Eyrie House. The hotel was closer to the Connecticut River and therefore more accessible than the hotel on Mount Holyoke, which spurred the owners of the latter establishment to build a rail line and a ferry dock from the river to the base of Mount Holyoke. The hotel burned down in 1901 when Street attempted to cremate two horses on the mountain and lost control of the fire, leaving only the cellar holes and the walls of the stone understory standing.

Another hotel, the Mount Tom Hotel, was constructed on the summit of Mount Tom in 1897, but it burned down three years later. Subsequently, rebuilt, it burned again in 1929 and was never rebuilt; in 1902 the property became the first parcel to become the Mount Tom State Reservation. In 1933 the Civilian Conservation Corps assisted with the construction of reservation structures and park roads still existent through the turn of the 21st century.

In 1897 the Holyoke Street Railway Company began constructing what would become known as "Mountain Park", a trolley park and later an amusement park on the east side of the range. The project changed hands several times until its closure in 1988 when competition from larger amusement parks gradually sapped business away what had become affectionately known by locals as "The Queen of the Mountain."

Both the Holyoke Range and the Mount Tom Range were part of a 1966 proposal by the National Park Service for a "Connecticut River National Recreation Area." Although the project was never realized, it has been followed through in spirit by a number of similar local and national conservation efforts, including an increased effort to acquire land on both ranges for state park expansion, the creation by the Commonwealth of Massachusetts of the Connecticut River Greenway State Park, and the recent proposal by the National Park Service for the inclusion of the Metacomet-Monadnock Trail in a new National Scenic Trail.

== Geology and environment ==
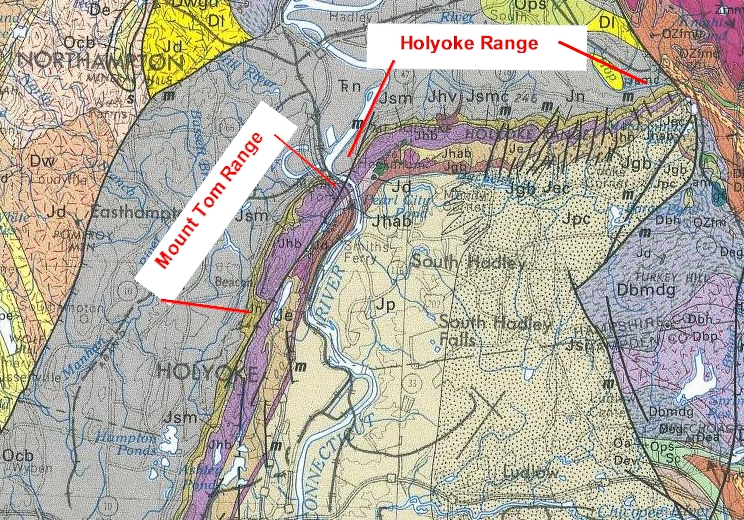
Bedrock geology. Purple=basalt; surrounding brown & blue-grey=sedimentary rock

The ridge of the Mount Tom Range was formed 200 million years ago during the late Triassic and early Jurassic periods and is composed of traprock, also known as basalt, an extrusive volcanic rock. Basalt is a dark colored rock, but the iron within it weathers to a rusty brown when exposed to the air, lending the ledges a distinct reddish appearance. Basalt frequently breaks into octagonal and pentagonal columns, creating a unique "postpile" appearance. Huge slopes made of fractured basalt talus are visible beneath many of the ledges; they are particularly noticeable beneath Mount Tom, Whiting Peak, and Deadtop along the Mount Tom State Reservation park road, or along Metacomet-Monadnock Trail on the summit crest gazing down. The basalt ridges are the product of several massive lava flows hundreds of feet deep that welled up in faults created by the rifting apart of North America from Eurasia and Africa. These basalt floods of lava happened over a period of 20 million years. Erosion occurring between the eruptions deposited deep layers of sediment between the lava flows, which eventually lithified into sedimentary rock. The resulting "layer cake" of basalt and sedimentary sheets eventually faulted and tilted upward. Subsequent erosion wore away the weaker sedimentary layers faster than the basalt layers, leaving the abruptly tilted edges of the basalt sheets exposed, creating the distinct linear ridge and dramatic cliff faces visible today. One way to imagine this is to picture a layer cake tilted slightly up with some of the frosting (the sedimentary layer) removed in between.

The Mount Tom Range hosts a combination of microclimates unusual in New England. Dry, hot upper ridges support oak savannas, often dominated by chestnut oak and a variety of understory grasses and ferns. Eastern red cedar, a dry-loving species, clings to the barren edges of cliffs. Backslope plant communities tend to be more similar to the adjacent Berkshire plateau containing species common to the northern hardwood and oak-hickory forest forest types. Eastern hemlock crowds narrow ravines, blocking sunlight and creating damp, cooler growing conditions with associated cooler climate plant species. Talus slopes are especially rich in nutrients and support a number of calcium-loving plants uncommon in Massachusetts. Because the traprock ridges generate such varied terrain, they are the home of several plant and animal species that are state-listed or globally rare.

The Mount Tom Range is also an important seasonal raptor migration path.

== Recreation ==
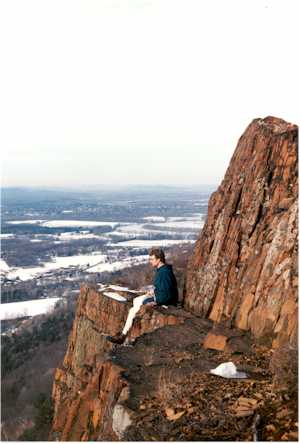

A low-profile network of seasonal auto roads and many miles of trails climb the ridgeline, including the 110-mile (180 km) Metacomet-Monadnock Trail maintained by the Berkshire Chapter of the Appalachian Mountain Club. The range is used for picnicking, hiking, and snowshoeing. Bicycling and cross-country skiing are enjoyed on the park roads. The ridge once hosted the Mount Tom Ski Area, now closed; the trails are still used for backcountry skiing, although there are no lifts in operation. Recently, as paragliding becomes an increasingly popular sport in the US, the Mt.Tom's western face serves as launch for flights as far as Worcester area. There are no camping facilities on the range.

A number of trail head parking lots are located within the Mount Tom State Reservation, accessible from Route 5 in Holyoke and East Street in Easthampton; only the eastmost lot is open off season. Parking lot access is available off Route 5 and at the south side of Whiting Street Reservoir, as well as off Route 141 in Holyoke by the Log Cabin Restaurant. During on-season months there is a charge to drive a vehicle into the Mount Tom State Reservation. Metacomet-Monadnock Trail parking is located off Route 141 on the gap between East Mountain and Mount Tom and also at the foot of Mount Nonotuck on Underwood Street in Easthampton where the Metacomet-Monadnock Trail descends from the ridge crest of the range.

== Conservation ==
Much of the range has been conserved as part of Massachusett's Mount Tom State Reservation; other parcels are managed by conservation non-profit organizations, including The Trustees of Reservations. In 2000, the Mount Tom Range was included in a study by the National Park Service for the designation of a new National Scenic Trail now tentatively called the New England National Scenic Trail, which would include the Metacomet-Monadnock Trail in Massachusetts and the Mattabesett Trail and Metacomet Trail trails in Connecticut.

In 2002, several conservation non-profit organizations and the Commonwealth of Massachusetts collaborated to successfully preserve a large tract on the east side of the range that was once part of a downhill ski area that closed in 1998. An existing rock quarry, part of the property, was also secured. The efforts were spurred by public outcry following overtures by the former landowner to sell the land to a nearby rock and gravel operation for the expansion of the existing quarry.

Other organizations invested in the conservation of the Mount Tom Range and its viewshed include The Kestrel Trust, The Valley Land Fund, and the Pascommuck Conservation Trust.

== See also ==
- Metacomet Ridge
- Metacomet-Monadnock Trail
- List of subranges of the Appalachian Mountains
- Nearby summits:

↓ South

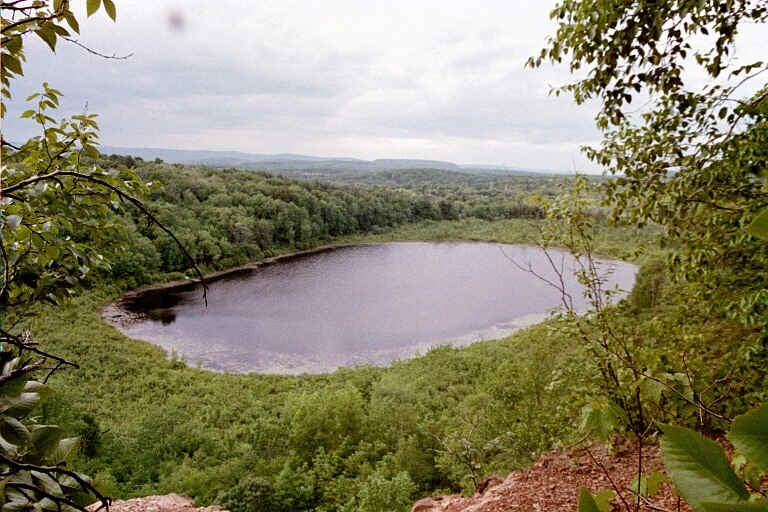
East Mountain

East >

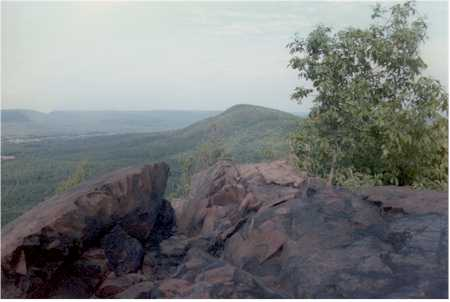
Holyoke Range
