= WRLP Tower =

Television mast in New Hampshire, United States

- Location within New Hampshire
- Alternative names: Gunn Mountain Tower

General information
- Status: Standing, not in use
- Type: Television mast
- Location: Winchester, New Hampshire, United States
- Coordinates: 42°45′35″N 72°25′59″W
- Elevation: 940 feet (286.5 m) (elevation at base)
- Completed: 1966
- Client: WRLP (1966–1978)
- Owner: B Meltel, LLC

Height
- Height: 663 feet (202 m)

The WRLP Tower, also known as the Gunn Mountain Tower, is a guyed television mast located in Winchester, New Hampshire, United States. Constructed in 1966, the registered height of the structure is 663 feet (202 m). The tower bears FCC registration number 1023108. It is the tallest man-made structure in the state of New Hampshire.

WRLP constructed a television mast prior to their debut on May 15, 1957. That tower had to be taken down in August 1966 after a small aircraft struck a guy wire during dense fog, killing both occupants of the aircraft. The existing tower was built as a replacement later that year. WRLP ceased operation on April 9, 1978, but the tower remains standing.

As of September 2004, photographs of the tower showed that the antenna assembly atop the mast had been removed, likely reducing its actual height from its registered height.

== See also ==
- List of tallest structures in the United States
