= WRLP (TV) =

Television station in Greenfield, Massachusetts (1957–1978)

Former satellite of WWLP, Springfield
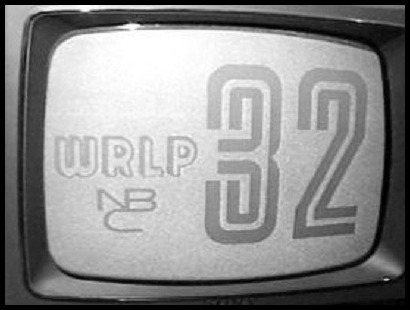
- Greenfield, Massachusetts/Keene, New Hampshire/Brattleboro, Vermont; United States
- City: Greenfield, Massachusetts
- Channels: Analog: 32 (UHF)
- Branding: "TV-32"

Programming
- Affiliations: NBC (1957–1978)

Ownership
- Owner: Springfield Television; (Springfield Television Broadcasting Corp.)
- Sister stations: WWLP

History
- First air date: June 29, 1957
- Last air date: April 9, 1978
- Call sign meaning: Roger Lowell Putnam

Technical information
- ERP: 562 kW
- HAAT: 918 ft (280 m)
- Transmitter coordinates: 42°45′35″N 72°26′1″W

WRLP was a television station marketed in Greenfield, Massachusetts, which broadcast on UHF channel 32 from 1957 to 1978. For most of its history, it was a satellite of WWLP in Springfield.

== History ==
=== Location ===
WRLP came into existence because of the technical limitations UHF stations faced in the 1950s. The Springfield market was designated as an all-UHF market due to all of the possible VHF allocations being unavailable due to it being surrounded by allocations for Boston, Massachusetts/Manchester, New Hampshire (channels 2, 4, 5, 7, 9 and 11), Hartford/New Haven (channels 3 and 8), Providence, Rhode Island (channels 6, 10 and 12) and the Capital District (Albany/Schenectady/Troy, channels 6, 10 and 13). This area is one of the most rugged in the Northeast, being dotted with small hills and mountains. Much of the population is also within, or just outside of, the winding valley of the Connecticut River. These factors made UHF reception difficult. Soon after WWLP signed on, the station's owners, the Putnam family, realized that much of the northern portion of the market in Franklin County northward—including Greenfield, Brattleboro, Vermont and Keene, New Hampshire—could not get an acceptable signal from WWLP. Further compounding these reception problems, UHF stations could not be viewed without the use of an expensive external signal converter (it was not until the passing of the All-Channel Receiver Act in 1962 that all new TVs were required to have UHF tuners built in). With cable still very much in its infancy, the Putnams decided to open WRLP as a full-time satellite of WWLP.

The station debuted on June 29, 1957. It was named after Roger L. Putnam, former mayor of Springfield and father of WWLP founder William Lowell Putnam III. The tower and transmitter was located on Gunn Mountain in Winchester, New Hampshire, one of the highest points in the region. The station could also be seen in Springfield, creating a strong combined signal with over 50% overlap.

WRLP was originally slated to operate on channel 58, but Putnam sought and received permission to move to the stronger channel 32. WRLP was to be the "parent" of a network of low-powered translators across western New England. However, that plan came undone when the FCC rejected a proposed reallocation of channel allocations in New England that would have allowed the WRLP translators to air on channel 72.

=== Closure ===
For its first 17 years, WRLP was a money-bleeding full-time satellite of WWLP. However, in 1974, the Putnams and their company, Springfield Television, decided to air separate programming on WRLP in prime-time, including a fully separate newscast. It picked up Boston Bruins, Celtics and Red Sox telecasts, and soon appeared on cable systems across Massachusetts, New Hampshire, Vermont, Connecticut and upstate New York. At one point, 70% of the station's audience was watching it on cable. Cable coverage was not factored in by advertisers at the time, so WRLP realized almost no financial benefit from its large cable audience. The station continued to lose money. WRLP later shutdown their news department on December 31, 1976.

In a case of exceptionally bad timing, WSBK-TV in Boston (the flagship television station for both Bruins and Red Sox games at the time) was uplinked to cable and satellite providers as a regional superstation, and WBZ-TV (then the Celtics' flagship television station) was also made available to some systems in the region, effectively cutting out WRLP's carriage of those sports properties and reaping the advertising revenue associated with them.

After 20 years, the Putnams' patience with the station was exhausted, and WRLP went off the air on April 9, 1978, with almost no fanfare. Almost immediately afterward, the station's transmitter was dismantled and transported to Utah to start Springfield Television's newest station, KSTU in Salt Lake City that October.
