= Springfield Television =

American owner of television stations

Springfield Television Corporation was a group owner of television stations based in Springfield, Massachusetts. The company was founded by William Lowell Putnam III, who launched the company's first television station, WWLP, on March 17, 1953. (Putnam was the son of politician and businessman, Roger Putnam. He was also a former trustee of the Lowell Observatory, founded by his great-uncle, astronomer Percival Lowell.)

The company owned five television stations during its lifetime, no more than four at any given time.

The company folded in 1984 with Putnam's retirement, and the sale of its remaining stations—WWLP, WKEF in Dayton, Ohio, and KSTU in Salt Lake City, Utah—to Adams Communications.

== Former stations ==
Market	Station	Years Owned	Today
Springfield, MA	WWLP 22** (NBC)	1953–1984	NBC affiliate owned by Nexstar Media Group
Greenfield, MA	WRLP-TV 32** (NBC; repeater of WWLP, to 1974) (independent; 1974–1978)	1957–1978	Defunct, went dark April 9, 1978; frequency never reactivated
Worcester - Boston, MA	WJZB-TV 14 (NBC; repeater of WWLP)	1958–1969	Defunct, went dark after a fire in Spring 1969, shortly after its sale to Evans Broadcasting; frequency never reactivated
Dayton, OH	WKEF 22 (ABC, 1966–1979) (NBC, 1980–2004)	1966–1984	ABC affiliate owned by Sinclair Broadcast Group
Salt Lake City, UT	KSTU 20** (independent)	1978–1984	Fox affiliate owned by the E. W. Scripps Company, operating on channel 13 under a different license
