= WJZB-TV =

Television station in Worcester, Massachusetts (1953–1969)

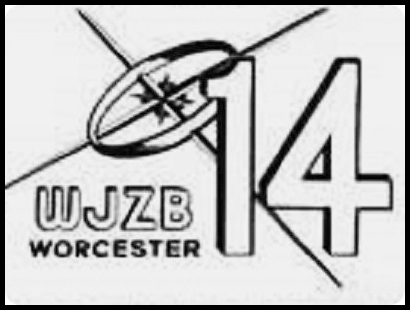
- Worcester, Massachusetts; United States
- Channels: Analog: 14 (UHF)

Programming
- Affiliations: Independent (1953–1955 and 1964–1969); Silent (1955–1958); NBC (1958–1964; secondary, 1953–1955 and 1964–1969); ABC (secondary, 1953–1955); DuMont (secondary, 1953–1955)

Ownership
- Owner: Salisbury Broadcasting (1953–1958); Springfield Television (1958–1969); Evans Broadcasting (1969, never consummated)

History
- First air date: December 4, 1953
- Last air date: May 7, 1969
- Former call signs: WWOR-TV (1953–1964)
- Call sign meaning: John Z. Buckley

Technical information
- ERP: 457 kW
- HAAT: 247 m (810 ft)
- Transmitter coordinates: 42°18′13.6″N 71°53′50.7″W

WJZB-TV (channel 14) was a television station located in Worcester, Massachusetts, United States. The station was on the air from 1953 to 1969, with a hiatus from 1955 to 1958.

== History ==
=== Challenge ===
The station first signed on the air in December 1953 as WWOR-TV (no relation to the current station in New York City that is licensed to Secaucus, New Jersey), operating as the second independent station in the Boston area. The station's transmitter was located on Asnebumskit Hill in Paxton. It also carried secondary affiliations with ABC and DuMont, and also cleared whatever NBC programs that WBZ-TV (channel 4, now a CBS owned-and-operated station) declined to air. WWOR had signed on just after the Federal Communications Commission (FCC) opened the UHF band for broadcasting use; television manufacturers were not yet required to include UHF tuning capability (Congress later passed the All-Channel Receiver Act in 1961, with UHF tuners beginning to be included on all newer sets as a result of its implementation by 1964). Even with the use of an expensive converter, WWOR's signal was marginal at best. No one was willing to advertise on a station that was barely viewable, and channel 14 went dark September 5, 1955.

In 1958, WWOR's owners, Salisbury Broadcasting, merged with Springfield Television Corporation, owner of NBC affiliate WWLP-TV in Springfield. The station returned to the air December 1 as a satellite of WWLP. It was only on the air for six hours a day to protect WBZ-TV. After six years, Springfield Television decided to turn channel 14 into a Boston-focused independent station once again, under new call letters, WJZB (named for WWLP staffer John Z. Buckley). In the 1960s, it began airing Boston Bruins and Boston Celtics games (from WHDH-TV in Boston), and also aired classic movies, syndicated sports programs, travelogues and other standard independent fare. It also retained a part-time NBC affiliation.

=== Closure ===
With a terrestrial footprint that covered portions of metropolitan Boston and Providence—as well as segments of eastern Connecticut—the station appeared to be on strong footing. However, the channel 14 transmitter was not capable of broadcasting in color. Additionally, the station's picture quality was marginal at best. As a result, like its predecessor, the station found it difficult to attract advertising.

The station's fate was sealed in 1966, when two major events occurred: first, Storer Broadcasting bought struggling independent WIHS-TV (channel 38) and changed its call letters to WSBK-TV. Secondly, a joint venture of Kaiser Broadcasting and the Boston Globe purchased WXHR-TV (channel 56, formerly WTAO-TV; now WLVI), which had been off the air for a decade, and returned the station to the air that December, changing its call letters to WKBG-TV.

Although Boston was large enough on paper to support three independent stations, WJZB's technical problems proved too much to overcome. The station limped along for another year until Springfield Television cut back its broadcast schedule to 90 minutes a day, the minimum required to satisfy its FCC license. The station signed on at 6 p.m. and signed off at 7:30 p.m., its sole programs being WWLP's evening newscasts and The Huntley-Brinkley Report.

In 1968, Springfield Television announced the sale of WJZB to Buckley and his new corporation, Evans Broadcasting. Buckley planned significant upgrades, including a new color transmitter capable of a million watts of power. However, before Buckley could close on the purchase, the studio and transmitter were destroyed in a fire on May 7, 1969. Once it became apparent that WJZB would never return to the air, Springfield Television surrendered the license to the FCC, which deleted it in February 1970 and reassigned WJZB's former frequency to two-way radio and land mobile use.
