= Mount Tom State Reservation =

State park in Massachusetts, United States

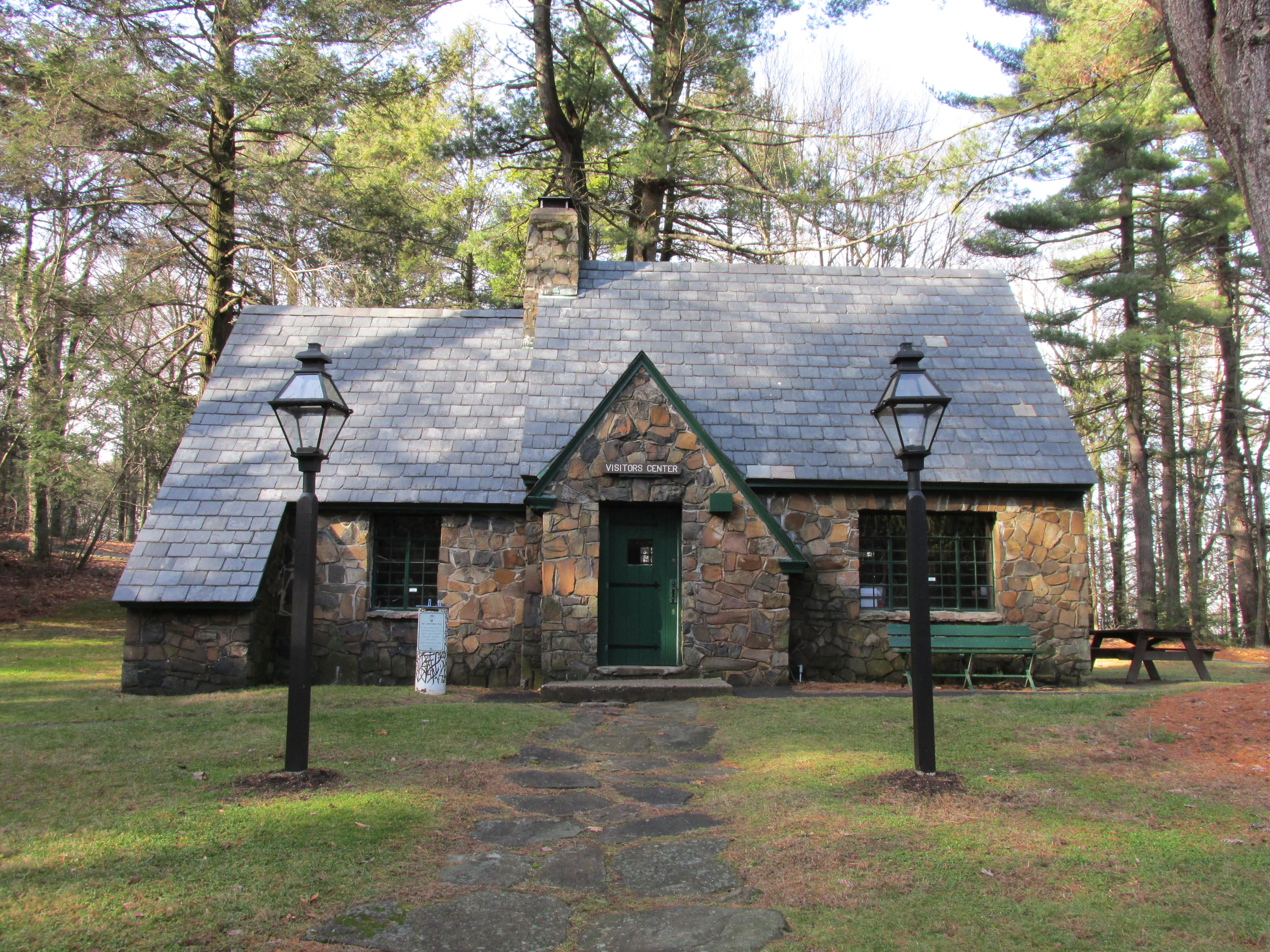
- Visitors Center

- Location within Massachusetts Location within the United States
- Location: Hampden and Hampshire counties, Massachusetts, United States
- Coordinates: 42°16′19″N 72°37′52″W
- Area: 1,967 acres (796 ha)
- Elevation: 830 ft (250 m)
- Administrator: Massachusetts Department of Conservation and Recreation
- Website: Official website

Mount Tom State Reservation encompasses the Mount Tom Range and is located in the Connecticut River Valley region of Massachusetts, just north of the city of Springfield. The reservation is noted for its high cliffs, rugged scenery, and biological diversity.

== Activities and amenities ==
Recreational activities include hiking, picnicking, fishing, cross-country skiing, snowshoeing, and ice skating. The 110-mile (180 km) Metacomet-Monadnock Trail passes through the reservation as do several low-profile seasonal auto roads. The reservation is also a popular place to observe seasonal raptor migrations.
