= Mount Tom Ski Area =

Ski resort in Holyoke, Massachusetts, U.S. (1962–1998)

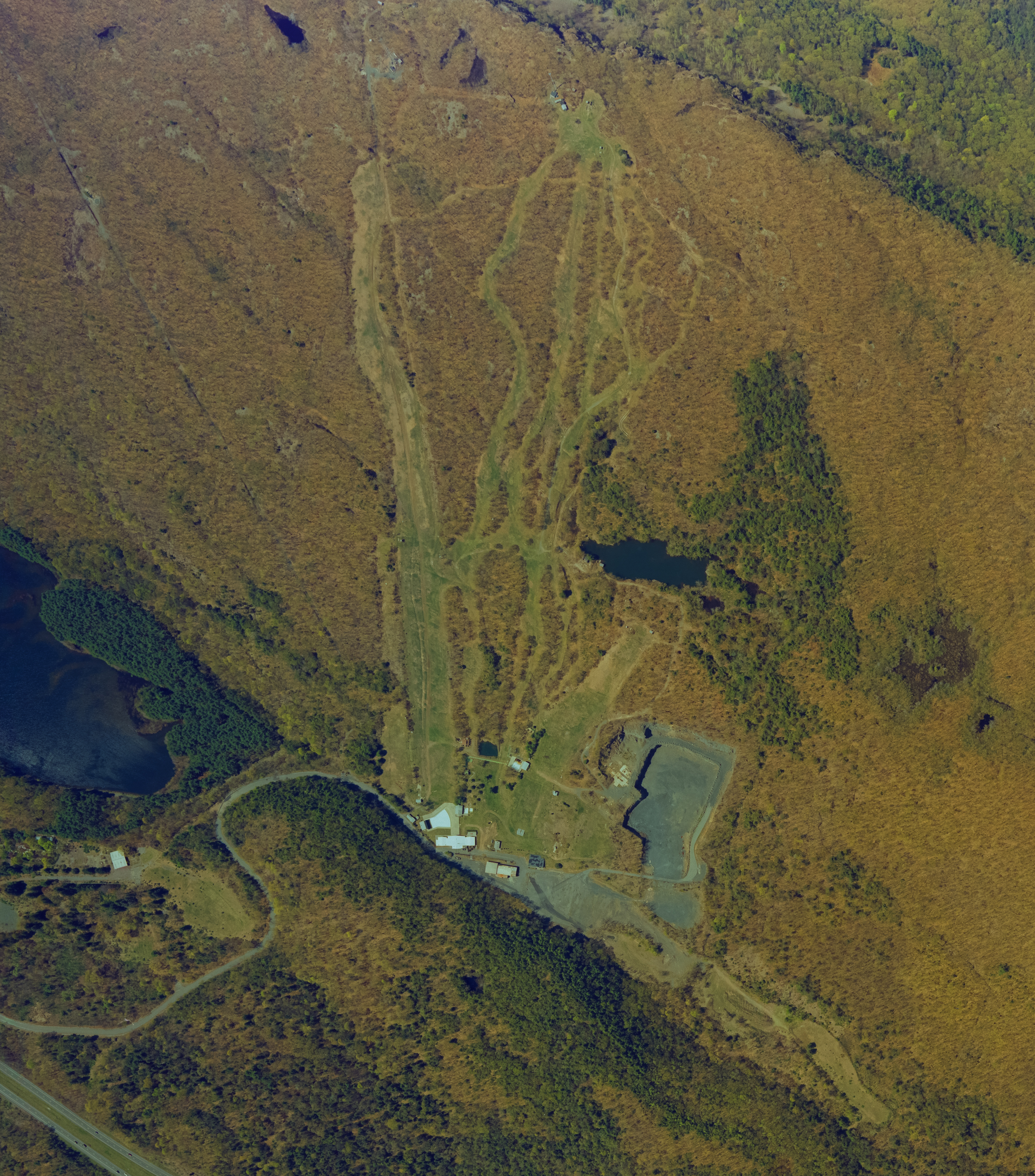
- The slopes of the former ski resort, used today for hiking and sledding
- Interactive map of Mount Tom Ski Area
- Location: Holyoke, Massachusetts, US
- Nearest city: Springfield
- Coordinates: 42°15′4.57″N 72°38′17.14″W
- Vertical: 680 ft (210 m)
- Trails: 15; 3 beginner 10 intermediate 2 advanced/expert
- Lift system: 4 Double Chairlifts, 2 T-bars, 1 J-Bar, 1 Rope Tow
- Snowmaking: Yes

Mount Tom Ski Area was a ski resort in Holyoke, Massachusetts, in the Mount Tom Range in the western part of Massachusetts about 10 miles north of Springfield. It opened in 1962 and closed in 1998. The slopes of the former ski area are located off U.S. Route 5 in the Smith's Ferry neighborhood of Holyoke, adjacent to the former Mountain Park, now a music venue.

Mt. Tom was owned by the O'Connell's Sons Construction Company. It was rumored that Mt. Tom was created so that the company could keep seasonal workers working during the winter and keep them available for the summer construction season.

== 1962 - 1998 ==
=== Ski School ===
Map of Mt. Tom Ski Area trails and lifts from the 1997 season

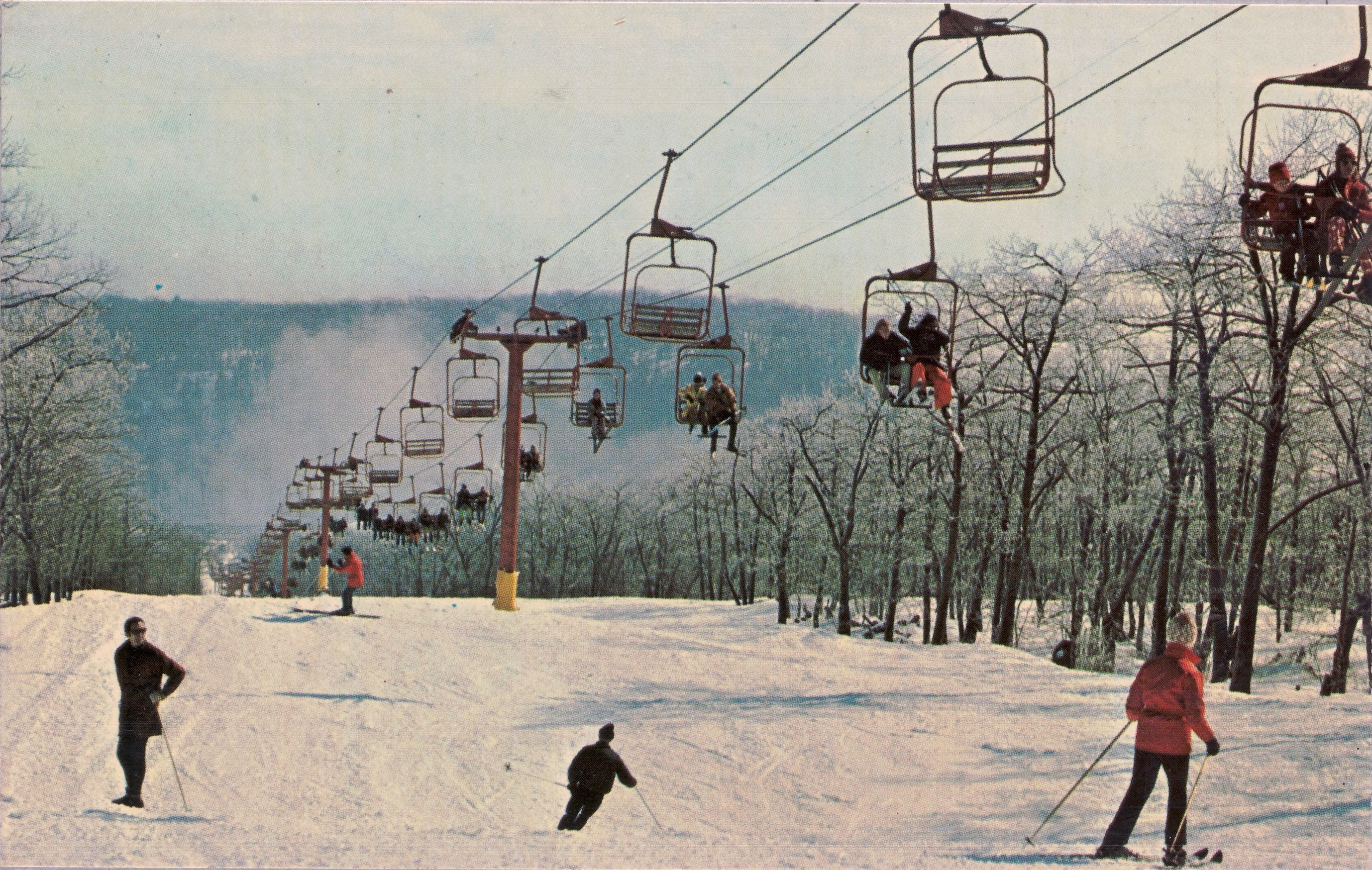
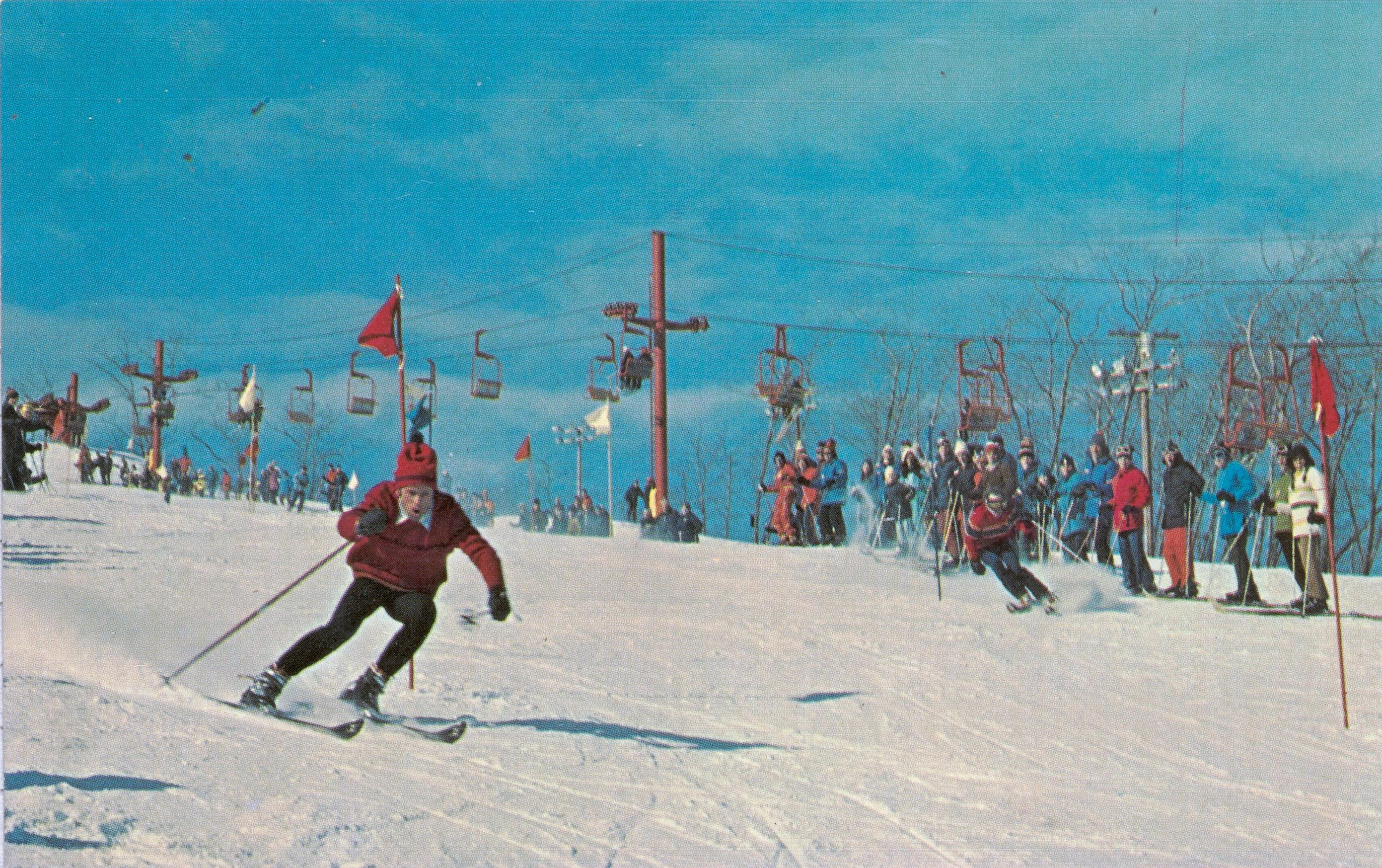
Skiers descend the slopes below a double chairlift (top); a NASTAR pacesetting trial at Mt. Tom (bottom), c. 1969

The Mt. Tom Ski School was staffed by Austrians primarily imported directly from Innsbruck to teach skiing in the US. One of its prominent Ski School Directors was Adi Scheidle who along with his brother Heinz Scheidle employed quite a few of the local skiers as Instructors. During the early years of Mt. Tom, Adi spent a lot of time selling local schools and other groups on organized lessons at Mt. Tom. He was very successful and generated a lot of ski lesson business for Mt. Tom as well as increasing the local skier base.

Adi was so successful at sales that he was promoted to Director of Skiing. Heinz Scheidle was promoted to ski school director and Ed Ryan, one of the American Instructors, was promoted to Asst. Ski School Director.

Smith College, Mount Holyoke and the University of Massachusetts all at one time also allowed their students to complete ski school programs as electives. At one time the school also had a special agreement training students of the Clarke Schools for Hearing and Speech.

=== Snow making ===
Mt. Tom was a leader in snow making in the United States. It made snow almost from its start with hand crafted snow machines. The snow machines were put together with several pieces of galvanized pipe and were little more that one piece of pipe connected to an air source with another pipe connected directly onto the side of the air pipe that fed water into the air stream. In 1969 for example, its entire 28 acres employed snowmaking, and the budget for this ran at $90,000, equivalent to about $650,000 in 2019. The ski area pursued this strategy to draw patrons from even northern New England in years of below-average snowfall.

In addition, the ski area constructed pipes set permanently on the side of many of the trails that fed water and air up the slopes so that the maximum amount of snow making could take place.

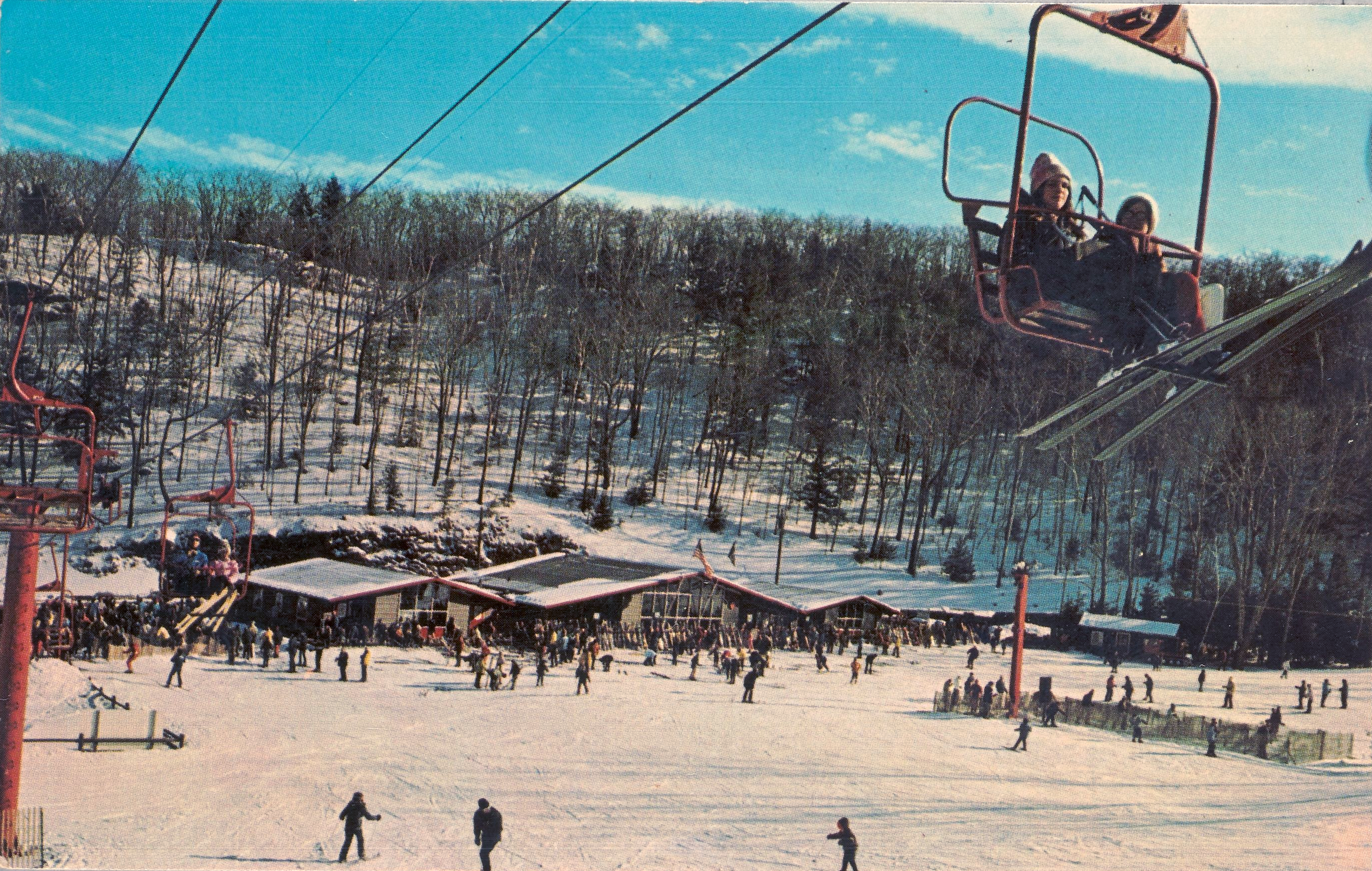
Skiers on the chairlift in front of the former lodge

=== Night skiing ===
Beginning in the 1967–68 season, Mt. Tom began offering night skiing.

Mt. Tom had extensive lighting allowing night skiing, and was described as having 100% lit trails before its closure. The slopes were extremely well lit, and could be seen from many miles away to the east of the mountain. Large wooden telephone poles were installed on the sides of the slopes with baseball stadium type lighting creating an almost daylight type of lighting with few shadows.

By the early 1990s, night skiing brought in roughly 40% of the ski area's revenue.

=== Race league ===
The local high school had a race league at Mt. Tom and raced several times a season against each other. Holyoke High, Holyoke Catholic, and South Hadley High School were regular participants in the league. In addition to the local high schools, the Williston Northampton School used the mountain for its Division II, and later Division I, ski team races, as well as its recreational ski program.

=== Water park ===
In the 1980s, Mt. Tom opened a water park that operated during the summer months, which included a wave pool and a water slide. It struggled to compete with Riverside Park (Massachusetts), in Agawam after they opened a water park of their own in the late 1980s.

== Post-closure ==
Since its closure many of the former resort's buildings have been destroyed by fire. In late 2016, a brush fire burned on the former ski slopes, burning mostly loose brush. No buildings caught fire in that event. However, from 2016 on, several smaller shacks were burned to the ground. In March 2018, the former ski rental shop was completely destroyed by a fire, and on February 23, 2020, the main lodge was almost entirely destroyed by another fire. Local fire officials suspected arson from the blaze. Shortly after the fire, crews demolished the building, reducing it to nothing but a foundation hole. It was then filled in with the torn-down debris of the building. All that remains of the former main lodge is its footprint.

While snowmaking equipment and chairlifts have been removed, small numbers of skiers in recent years have continued to ascend the area's slopes on foot.

In 2017, a proposal from a local-area resident was brought to the city planning board's attention to re-open the ski area. As of 2026, no proposals have been successful.
