= William P. Yoerg =

American politician

William Paul Yoerg
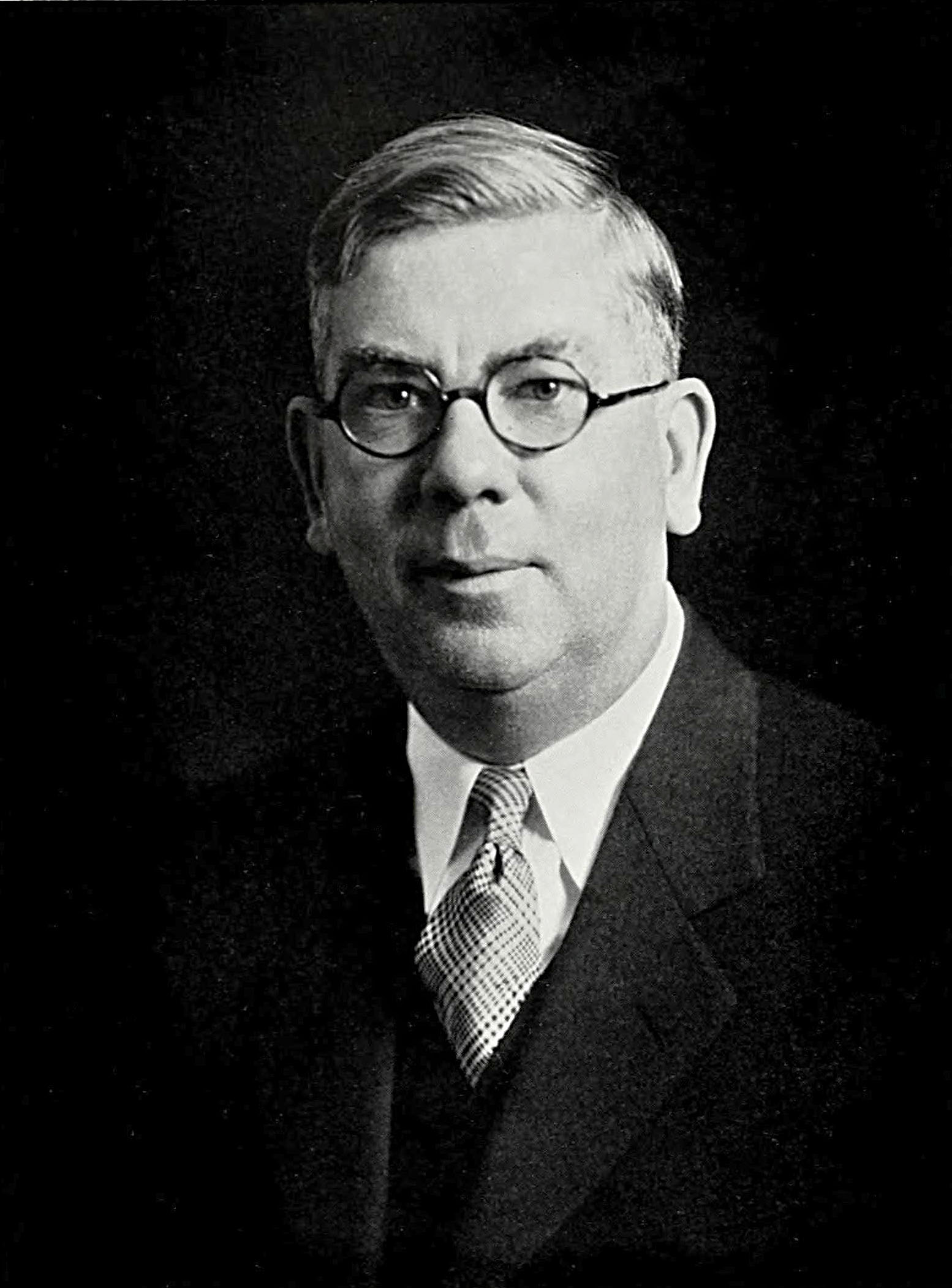
- Portrait of William Yoerg as mayor, 1936

32nd Mayor of the City of Holyoke, Massachusetts
- In office 1936–1939
- Preceded by: Henry J. Toepfert
- Succeeded by: Henry J. Toepfert

Executive Director of the Holyoke Housing Authority
- In office 1939 - 1940

Personal details
- Born: October 16, 1883; South Hadley Falls, Massachusetts, U.S.
- Died: September 26, 1957 (aged 73); Holyoke, Massachusetts, U.S.
- Resting place: St. Jerome's Cemetery, Holyoke, Massachusetts, U.S.
- Political party: Democratic
- Spouse: Mary G. Dugan
- Children: 1

William Paul Yoerg (October 16, 1883 – September 26, 1957) was an American politician, businessman, and the 32nd mayor of Holyoke, Massachusetts. A tire salesman and garage proprietor prior to his political career, Yoerg established his company, Yoerg Tire & Rubber Company in 1909, reportedly selling more U.S. Brand tires than any other New England competitor during his time in business, overseeing it in some capacity until his retirement in 1954. During his tenure as mayor, he presided during several WPA projects, including the expansion of Mackenzie Stadium, completion of the city's War Memorial Building, and the construction of flood controls in the downtown and Springdale. He also ran an unsuccessful campaign for Lieutenant Governor in 1938.

== Personal life ==
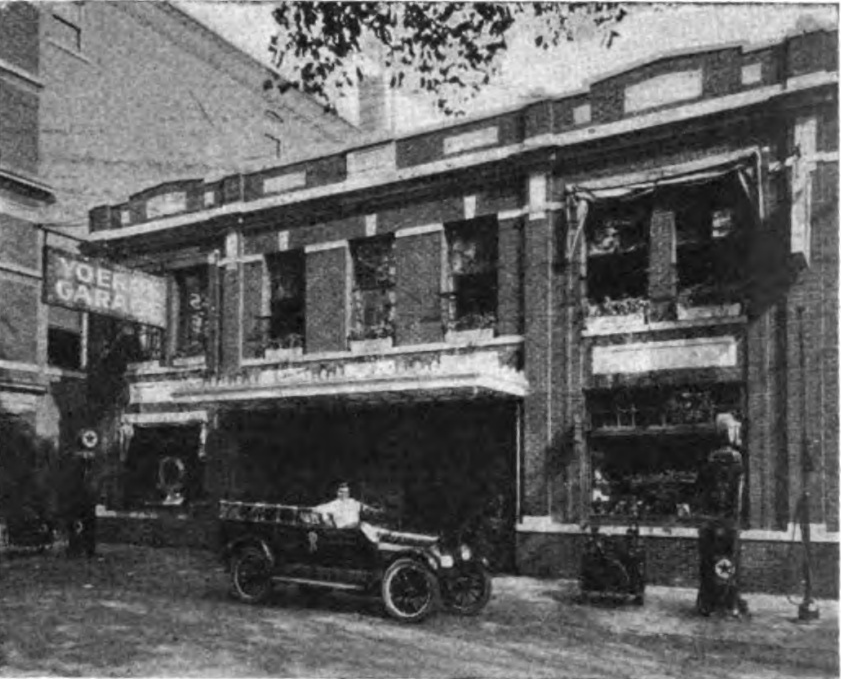
Yoerg sitting in a service car in front of his Chestnut Street garage, 1922

William Paul Yoerg was born in South Hadley Falls, Massachusetts, on October 16, 1883, to Michael John, a mill supervisor, and Nellie Yoerg (née O'Brien). Yoerg would attend public school in South Hadley until he was 13, when he took up work as an errand boy and eventual clerk for the J. Russell & Company Hardware Store in Holyoke. At 18 he became a clerk and eventual manager for the Revere Tire Company on Main Street, beginning his automotive business career, and by the age of 23 was serving as a travelling sales representative for Diamond Rubber. On November 17, 1907, he married his wife, Mary G. Dugan of Ware at St. Patrick's Church in South Hadley, and on April 19, 1909, went on to open his own tire business. Initially across from City Hall at 496 Dwight Street, Yoerg would gradually build his business over the next three decades with the phrase "Call Yoerg, 804", capitalizing on the still-relatively new telephone system. He would change locations several times to accommodate his growing business until he eventually settled Yoerg Tire and Rubber at 158 Chestnut Street in 1915, where it remained until his retirement in 1954; his former garage building still stands at that address today. Prior to his election he would also serve as the president of the Holyoke Automobile Maintenance Association and on the board of directors of the Tri-County Automobile Club.

== Mayoralty ==
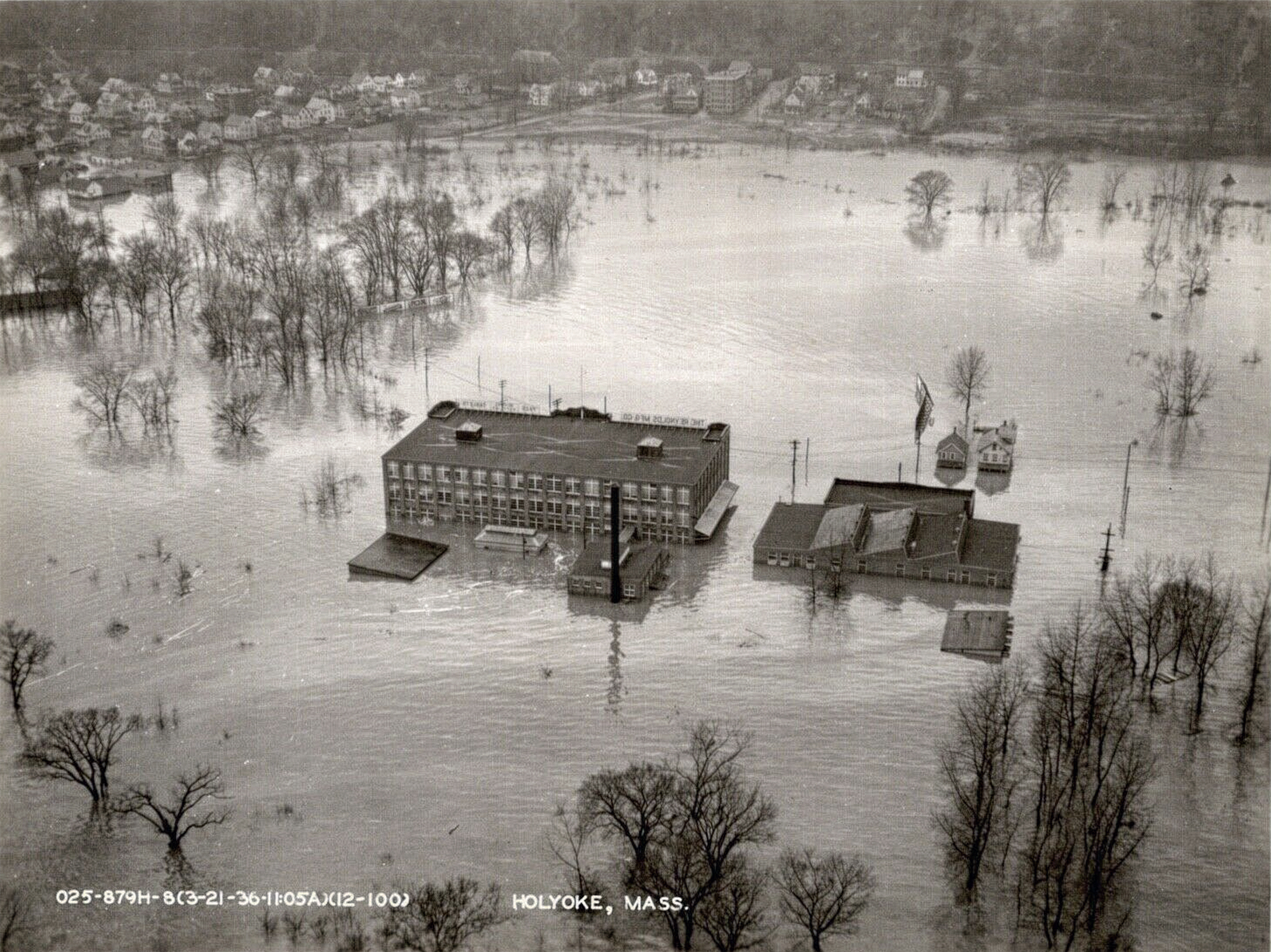
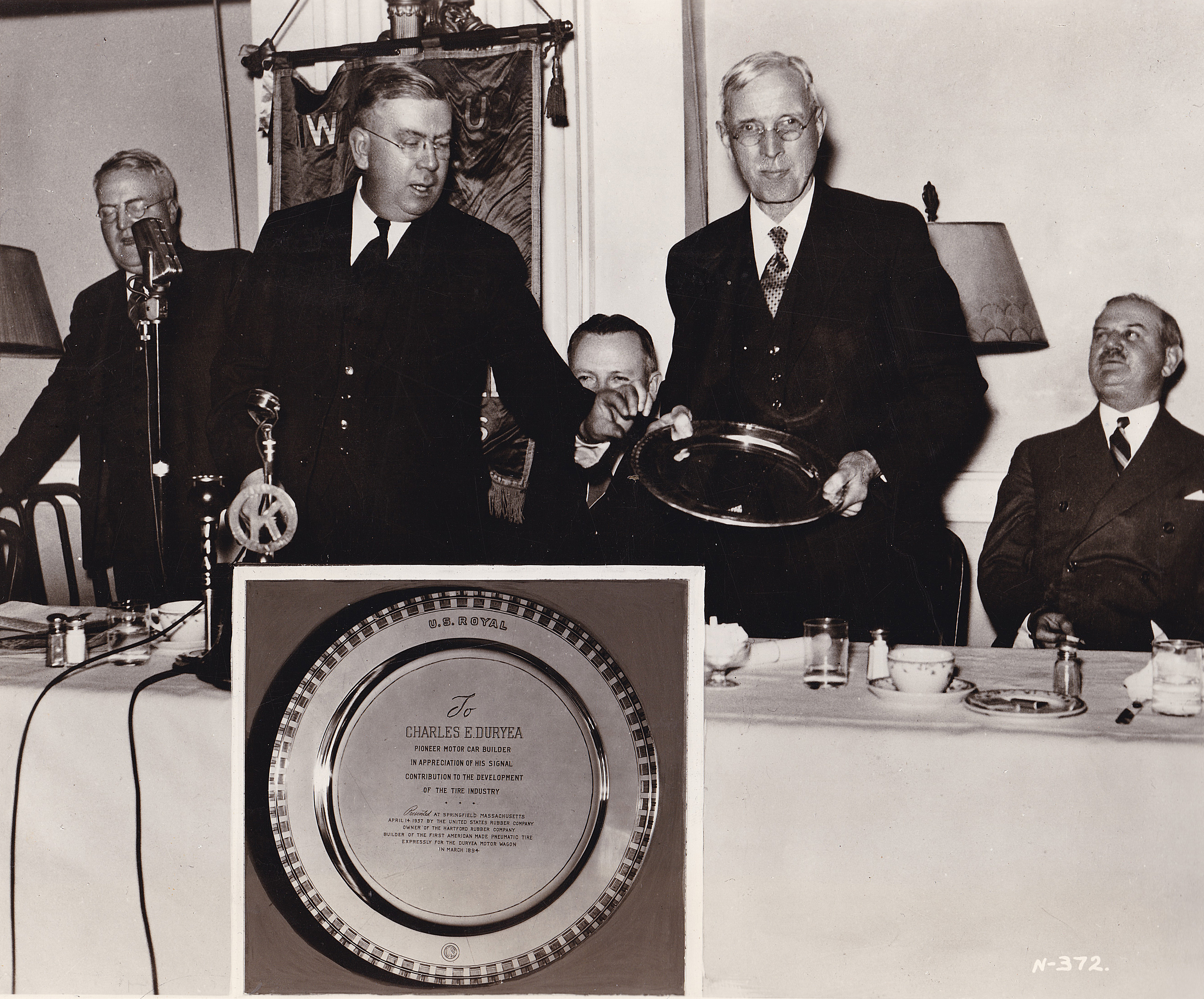
The Reynolds Mfg. plant in Springdale during the Flood of March 1936. Yoerg would advocate for the construction of the levies in Congressional hearings following the passage of the Flood Control Act of 1936; Yoerg presents an award by the United States Rubber Company to Charles Duryea for being the first to use pneumatic tires on an automobile, effectively starting the American automobile tire industry

In 1934 Yoerg would run for the first time against incumbent Mayor Henry Toepfert, but this first campaign proved unsuccessful. On October 30, 1935, Yoerg again took out nomination papers. Although his father, a mill supervisor, had been active in Democratic politics, Yoerg's campaign and subsequent win in the throes of the Great Depression were reported as unexpected by the Boston Herald. Yoerg managed to successfully posture himself as a more responsive alternative to the incumbent Henry Toepfert, with his campaign chairman labeling the mayor "dictatorial" for his refusal to enforce traffic orders passed by the board of alderman for new stop signs and traffic patterns. He would go across the city appealing to many of its clubs and groups across ethnic and class lines, reportedly holding 10 rallies in a single day, criticizing the incumbent administration's actions as opaque and unresponsive. Ultimately by characterizing his opponent as autocratic, chastising Toepfert's hold over the welfare commission, and using accident statistics and appealing to his experience in the automotive industry, Yoerg was able to win over voters. He won in an electoral upset by a margin 1,203 votes on December 3, 1935.

Holyoke mayoral election, 1934

Candidates	General election	
	Votes	%
Henry J. Toepfert (inc.)	10,160	45.9%
William P. Yoerg	7,163	32.4%
Simon A. Flynn	3,704	16.8%
Edward S. Alden	1,004	4.5%
John B. Donohue	65	0.4%

Holyoke mayoral election, 1935

Candidates	General election	
	Votes	%
William P. Yoerg	11,216	52.1%
Henry J. Toepfert. (inc.)	10,013	46.5%
Emile P. Chasse	301	1.4%

Holyoke mayoral election, 1936

Candidates	General election	
	Votes	%
William P. Yoerg (inc.)	12,369	60.6%
Robert E. Cleary	7,534	36.9%
Charles Breen	511	2.5%

Holyoke mayoral election, 1937

Candidates	General election	
	Votes	%
William P. Yoerg (inc.)	9,607	47.7%
Henry J. Toepfert	7,086	35.2%
William E. Kirkpatrick	3,440	17.1%

During his tenure Yoerg would work directly with President Franklin Roosevelt, meeting with him in Springfield on August 1, 1936, on behalf of the mayors and selectmen of Western Massachusetts, and testifying before Congress, to rally for WPA funding of new infrastructure projects for flood controls, utilities, and recreation. In 1938 he was credited with successfully lobbying for nearly $1.5 million in Works Progress Administration funds for several streets and sewers projects, equivalent to $26.7 million dollars in 2019 US Dollars. Influenced by Roosevelt's fireside chats, in 1939 Yoerg would also spend a series of radio broadcasts outlining the housing, infrastructure, and other issues that needed to be addressed by the city and its counterparts in state and Federal government.

Yoerg would go on to win two more elections, defeating Toepfert-favorite Dr. Robert Cleary in 1936, and Toepfert a second time in 1937, marking the beginning of the first 2-year term in the city's history. Two months before the election, in October 1939, Yoerg would drop out of the race to lead the newly-formed Holyoke Housing Authority as it planned its first project, Lyman Terrace. He would perform his duties as executive director of the agency without salary until September 1940, when he would resign to resume his full-time duties managing his garage.

== Later life and death ==
Following the end of his term as director of the housing authority, for much of the remainder of his life, Yoerg would remain involved in his garage business, and as a field representative of the local Tri-County Automobile Club. He would later offer public support for controversial Mayor Edwin A. Seibel in the 1950s, who in return would appoint him to the board of the department of public works from 1953 to 1956. After a period of illness, Yoerg died at the age of 72 on September 26, 1957; he was interred in St. Jerome's Cemetery.

== Legacy ==
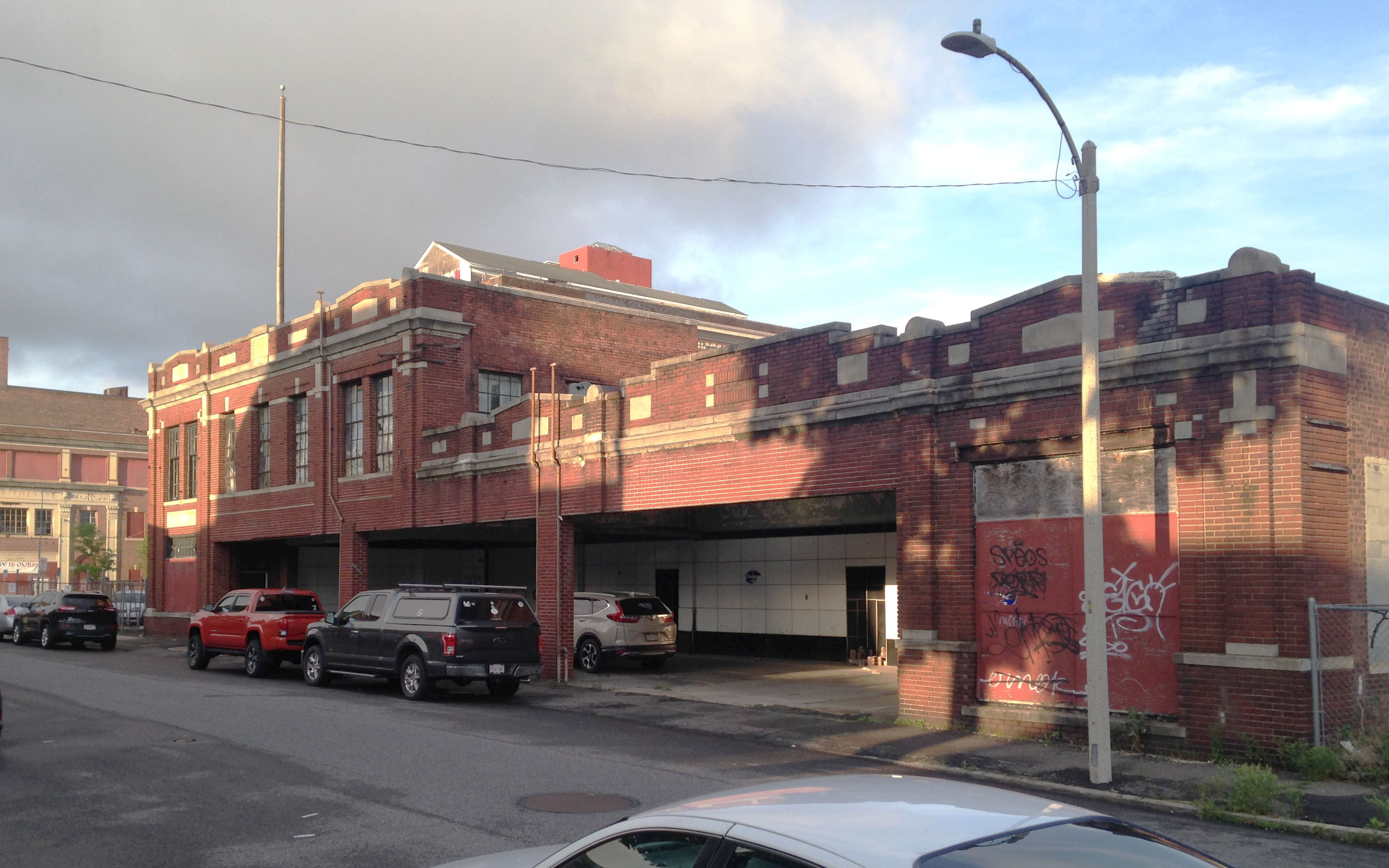
The former home of Yoerg's Garage, as it appeared in 2019; the building was designed in 1915 for Yoerg by Holyoke architect George P. B. Alderman.

Yoerg's relatively brief tenure, left a considerable legacy in Holyoke, through the many WPA projects that he and his administration pursued, including the War Memorial Building, modernization projects of Mitchell Field and Mackenzie Stadium, modernizing of sewer systems, construction of the city's levy and pumping station systems, the implementation of modern school lunch programs, and the building of Lyman Terrace and Holyoke Housing Authority. With Yoerg's extensive ties to the automobile industry, serving as a director of the Tri-County Automobile Club, he would however assure that the Holyoke Street Railway Company completely dismantled its tracks on city streets with the termination of trolley service in 1937. Yoerg's Garage still stands today at Chestnut Street, as does Yoerg Circle in Beaudoin Village, the latter memorializing his pro bono service in helping to establish the housing authority.

Political offices
Preceded by Henry J. Toepfert	Mayor of Holyoke; 1936-1939	Succeeded by Henry J. Toepfert
