= Caledonia Building =

- U.S. National Register of Historic Places
- U.S. Historic district – Contributing property
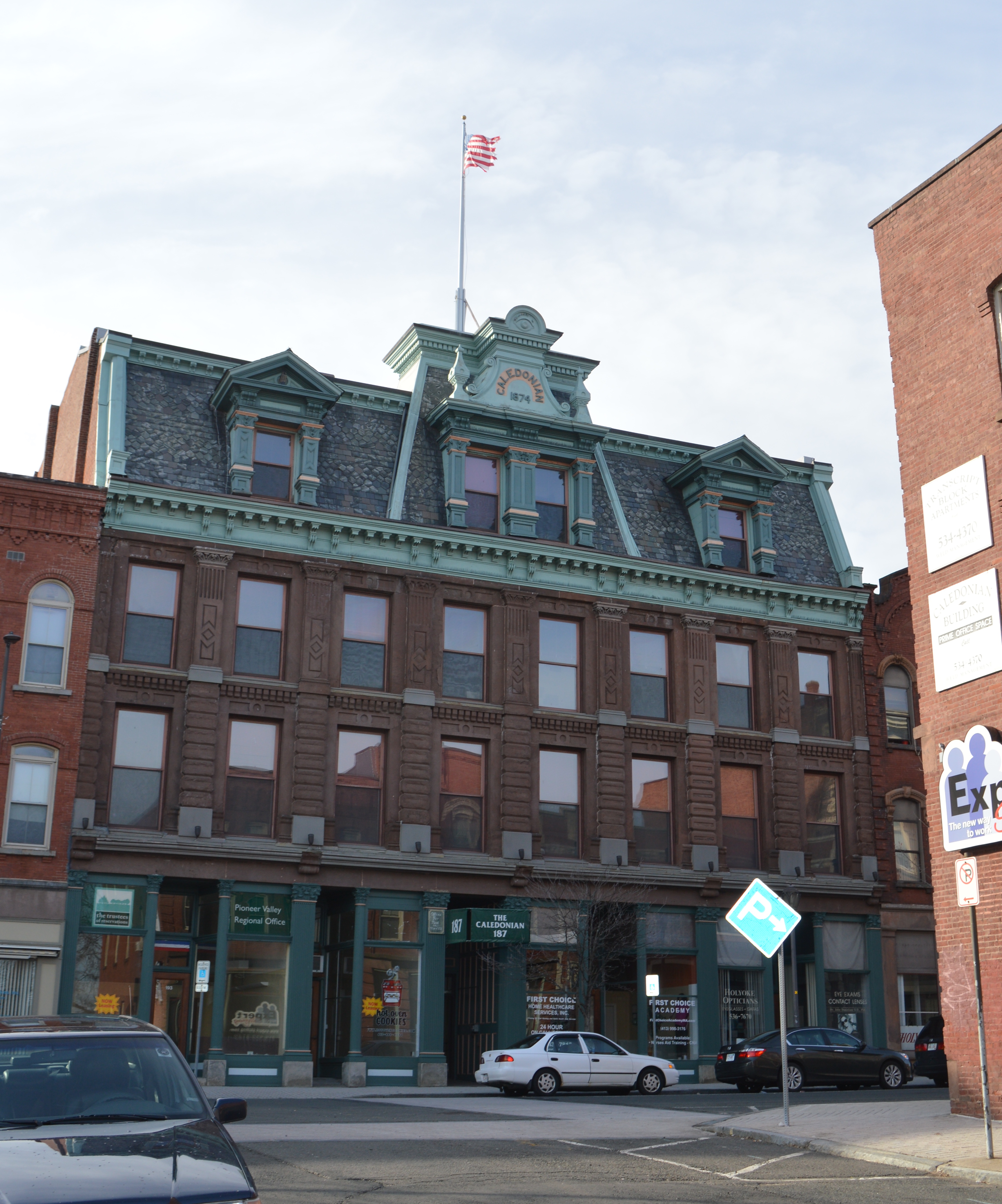

- Location within Holyoke Location within Massachusetts Location within the United States
- Location: 185-193 High St., Holyoke, Massachusetts
- Coordinates: 42°12′27″N 72°36′27″W
- Area: less than one acre
- Built: 1874
- Architectural style: Second Empire
- Part of: North High Street Historic District (ID86001376)
- NRHP reference No.: 79000346

Significant dates
- Added to NRHP: July 3, 1979
- Designated CP: June 26, 1986

The Caledonia Building, also known as Caledonian Hall or The Caledonian, is a historic commercial building located at 185–193 High Street in downtown Holyoke, Massachusetts. Built in 1874, it is one of that commercial district's finest examples of Victorian architecture and a rare representative example of the development of the city's Scottish immigrant community. It was listed on the National Register of Historic Places on July 3, 1979, and was included in the North High Street Historic District on June 26, 1986.

== Description and history ==
Emblem of the Holyoke Caledonia Benefit Club, c. 1904–1962

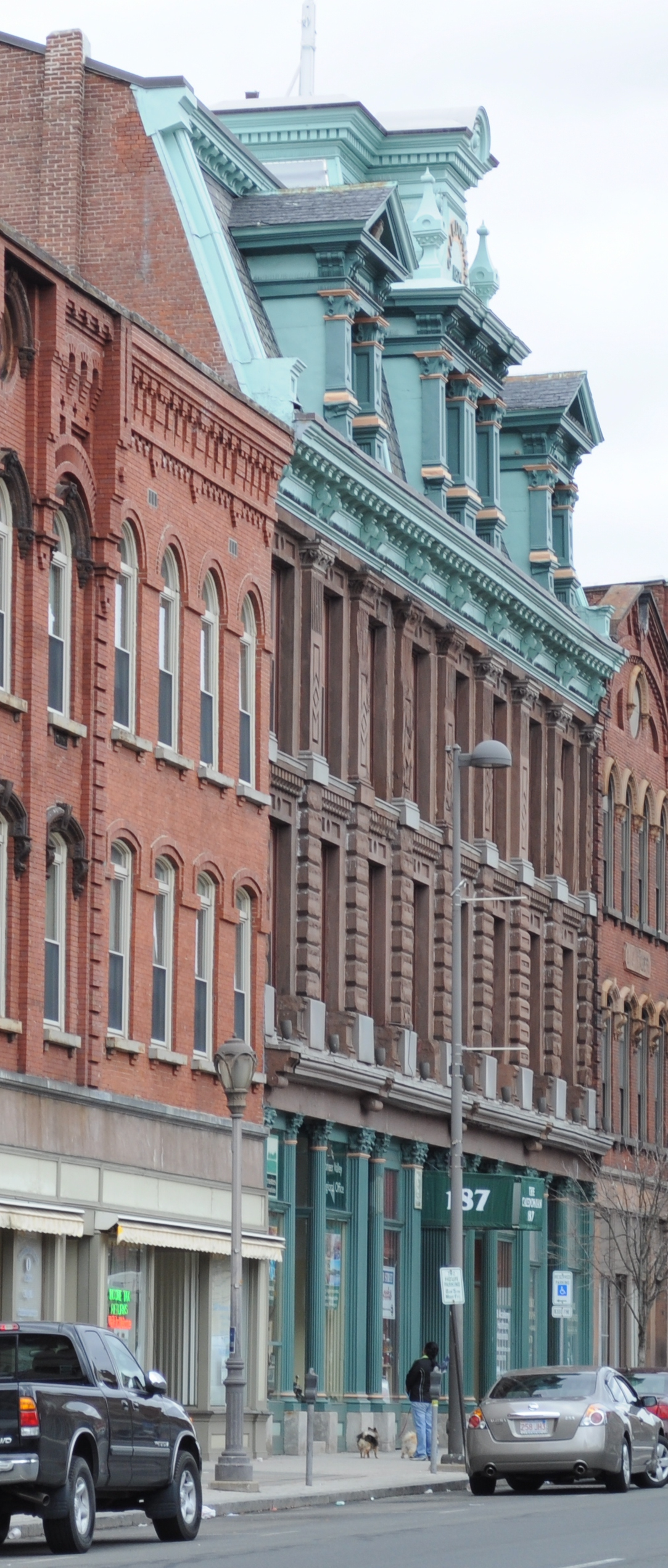
The Caledonia Building with its many brownstone details, seen from its side

The Caledonia Building is located in Holyoke's downtown North High Street commercial district, on the northwest side of High Street opposite John Street. It is a four-story brownstone structure, sharing party walls with neighboring buildings and topped by a mansard roof. The ground floor is divided into four storefronts articulated by fluted pilasters, with the main building entrance near the center. Three of the four store fronts have recessed entrances flanked by display windows on both sides, while the storefront left of the entrance is flanked by a window on just one side. A cornice separates the ground floor from the upper floors, which have eight bays of windows. Piers of decorative stonework separate the window bays, which are capped by ornamented brownstone lintels. The roof is slate, with single-window dormers flanking a central projecting pavilion.

The building was constructed in 1874 for Roswell P. Crafts, a local businessman and politician who served as Holyoke's second mayor, and was thus known as the Craft Building. Its first floor housed businesses, the second and third floors house offices, and the fourth floor was an open ballroom space. In 1879, the Caledonian Benefit Society, established to assist immigrating Scots, began meeting on the top floor; it purchased the building in 1909.

From 1910 until 1966, the third floor banquet hall of the building served as the regular practice space of the Holyoke Caledonian Pipe Band.

== See also ==
- National Register of Historic Places listings in Hampden County, Massachusetts
