= Joshua A. Garcia =

American politician (born 1986)

Josh Garcia
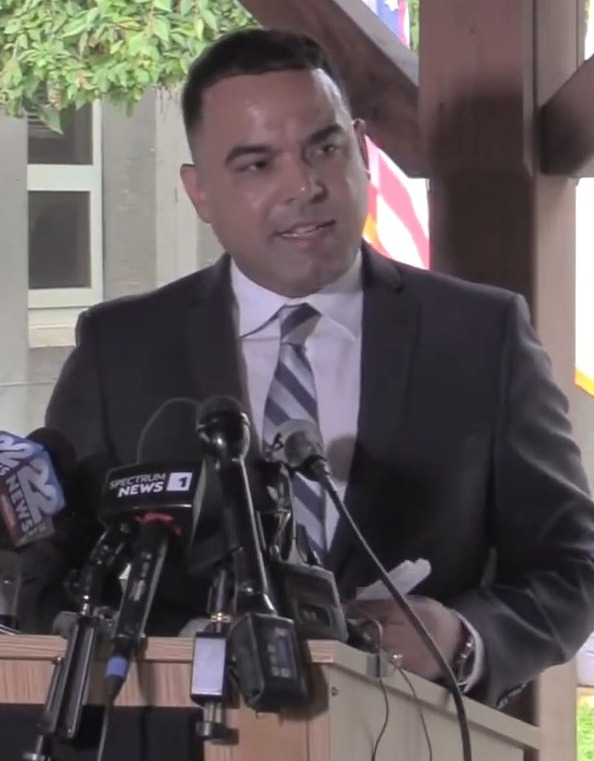
- Garcia in 2023

45th Mayor of Holyoke
- Incumbent
- Assumed office November 15, 2021
- Preceded by: Terence Murphy (acting); Alex Morse

Town Administrator of Blandford
- In office October 1, 2018 – November 4, 2021
- Preceded by: Angeline Lopes Ellison
- Succeeded by: Christopher Dunne

Personal details
- Born: February 28, 1986 (age 40) Holyoke, Massachusetts, U.S.
- Party: Democratic
- Spouse: Stefany Escobar (m. 2014)
- Education: Westfield State University (BA, MPA)
- Website: Government website Campaign website

Joshua A. Garcia (born February 28, 1986) is an American politician from Holyoke, Massachusetts. He was elected Mayor of Holyoke in 2021, and is the first Latino to serve as mayor of Holyoke.

== Early life and education ==
Born and raised in Holyoke, Massachusetts, Garcia received a Master's in Public Administration from Westfield State University and worked for the Holyoke Housing Authority and Pioneer Valley Planning Commission. His mother and grandmother came to the United States from Puerto Rico.

== Career ==
Before being elected as mayor, Garcia served as town administrator in Blandford, Massachusetts and as a fire commissioner, and school committee member in Holyoke. He became the first Latino to be elected mayor of Holyoke.

=== Mayoral tenure ===
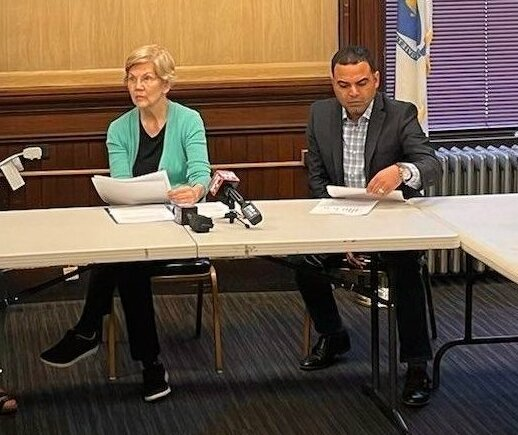
Garcia with U.S. Senator Elizabeth Warren in March 2022

Although Garcia's term as mayor officially started in January 2022, starting on November 15, 2021, Garcia served the remainder of acting mayor Terence Murphy's term.

Among early key priorities, Garcia has pushed for improved management practices, citing during his campaign his prior experience as a town administrator. Testifying before the Commonwealth's municipal finance oversight board, Garcia stated he intended to draft a longterm capital plan for the city, seeking to strengthen internal controls, and work toward eliminating structural deficits to make it less reliant on bonding. In 2024, Garcia announced he was working to expand the city's payment in lieu of taxes (PILOT) program with Holyoke's nonprofit property owners, to address shortfalls in taxes to provide city services.

== Personal life ==
Garcia has served as a member of the board of directors on the Holyoke Community College Foundation, as well as the Public Health Institute of Western Massachusetts, since 2018. In 2015 Garcia was named in BusinessWest's "40 Under 40" for his work with the Pioneer Valley Planning Commission. Garcia is also a Freemason and an active member of the Mount Tom Lodge A.F. & A.M..

Political offices
Preceded by Alex B. Morse	Mayor of Holyoke; 2021–present	Incumbent
