= Edwin A. Seibel =

American politician (1902–1957)

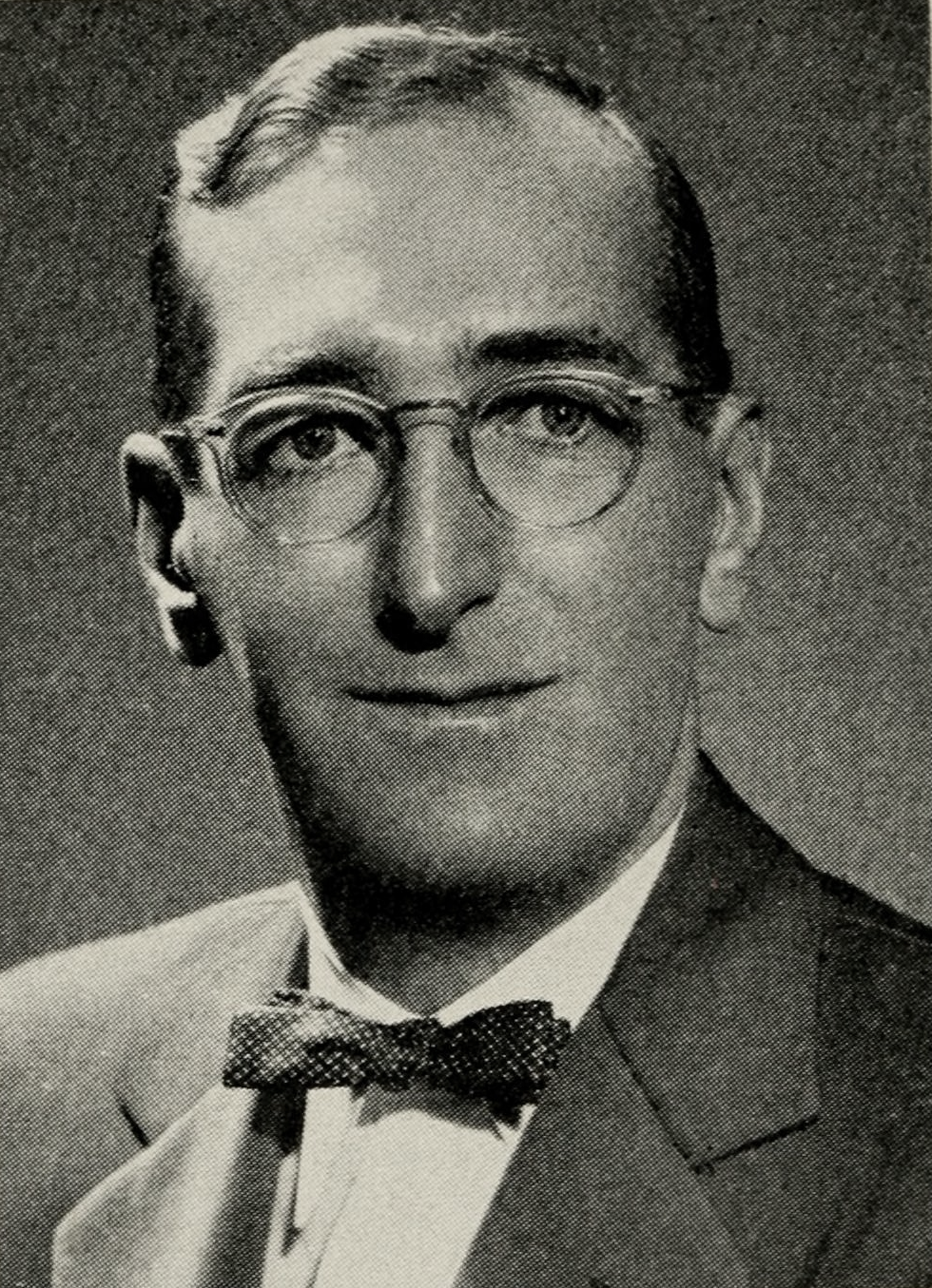
- Portrait of Edwin Seibel as a state legislator, and concurrently mayor, c. 1954

34th Mayor of the City of Holyoke, Massachusetts
- In office 1953–1957
- Preceded by: James T. Doherty (acting); Henry J. Toepfert
- Succeeded by: Samuel Resnic

Member of the Massachusetts House of Representatives from the 13th Hampden district
- In office 1951–1954
- Preceded by: Gerald T. Bowler
- Succeeded by: John J. Cavanaugh

Personal details
- Born: Edwin Andrews Seibel; January 9, 1902 Holyoke, Massachusetts, US
- Died: September 9, 1957 (aged 55) Holyoke, Massachusetts, US
- Resting place: Forestdale Cemetery, Holyoke
- Party: Republican
- Spouse: Margaret T. Keenan
- Education: Troy Conference Academy

Edwin Andrews Seibel (January 9, 1902 – September 9, 1957) was an American journalist, activist, legislator, executive director of the Holyoke Taxpayers' Association, member of the Massachusetts House of Representatives, and the 34th mayor of Holyoke, Massachusetts. Between his unorthodox lack of political allies, nomination by both Democratic and Republican parties in the same election, management style, and tenure as both a state representative and mayor concurrently, Seibel was described posthumously by a columnist for the Boston Traveller as "the most controversial mayor in Holyoke's history". During his tenure, Seibel oversaw the reduction in size of the Board of Alderman, a predecessor of the city council from 27 to 11 members.

== Personal life ==
Edwin Andrews Seibel was born in Holyoke on January 9, 1902, to John and Cora L. Seibel (née Benhard). He attended Holyoke High School and graduated in the class of 1921, before attending Troy Conference Academy, better known as Green Mountain College. Subsequently he entered journalism and spent several years as sports editor for the Holyoke Telegram, prior to its merger with the Transcript. Following the merger Seibel joined the staff of the Springfield Union as a sports writer and general news reporter, publishing accounts for that paper as well as the T-T for nearly 17 years before his departure for the Taxpayers' Association. He took special interest in the Springfield Union's annual marble tournament, even producing a competitor who would go on to represent the paper's team in the nationals. He was a prominent member of the "Holyoke Fourth Estate", a reporters fraternity, and in his own interest wrote a length history of the athletic notables of the city at a school, college, and professional level. Seibel was also described as active in the Holyoke YMCA for many years.

== State representative ==
=== Elections ===
In his first election, Seibel enjoyed the backing of both political parties. While always identified with the Republicans, he was seen as an anti-establishment candidate, and was able to win an additional nomination from a Democratic Party split among 14 candidates before rules were changed to prevent cross-filing. This was not entirely unprecedented; while it would be for the non-partisan mayoralty, in a previous generation William Whiting II received endorsement from both party committees, though not as a candidate for state office.

Massachusetts House of Representatives, 13th Hampden District, (Note: Representing Holyoke wards 3 and 6.) 1950

Candidates	General election	
	Votes	%
Edwin A. Seibel (D-R) (Note: During this election Seibel won nomination from both local party committees and is listed in state statistics as a "Democratic-Republican")	6,024	71.3%
James R. Farrell (I)	2,429	28.7%
All Others	1	0.0%

Massachusetts House of Representatives, 13th Hampden District, 1952

Candidates	General election	
	Votes	%
Edwin A. Seibel (R, inc.)	6,069	56.7%
James T. Doherty (D)	4,639	43.3%

Massachusetts House of Representatives, 13th Hampden District, 1954

Candidates	General election	
	Votes	%
Edwin A. Seibel (R, inc.)	3,781	41.7%
James T. Doherty (D)	5,295	58.3%

== Mayoralty ==
=== Elections ===
During his initial upset, during which he was described by his opponents as the "most unpopular man in Holyoke", among supporters for Seibel were his predecessors Gregory J. Scanlon and William P. Yoerg, the latter of whom served as a public supporting figure in Seibel's first mayoral campaign.

Holyoke mayoral special election, 1953

Candidates	General election	
	Votes	%
Edwin A. Seibel	8,707	42.3%
Robert J. Greaney	5,063	24.6%
Ernest W. Brunault	3,487	16.9%
John J. Stiles	2,793	13.6%
Frank J. McKay	402	2.0%
Write-ins	133	0.6%

Holyoke mayoral election, 1953

Candidates	General election (Note: Unofficial tally, source mentions one precinct missing from tally.)	
	Votes	%
Edwin A. Seibel (inc.)	13,257	53.2%
William F. Stapleton	11,663	46.8%

Holyoke mayoral election, 1955

Candidates	General election	
	Votes	%
Edwin A. Seibel (inc.)	9,232	39.1%
Joseph Jubinville, Jr.	7,682	32.5%
John G. McLean	6,580	27.8%
Write-ins	136	0.6%

=== Threat on life ===
The note left in Seibel's mail the morning after the murder of Alderman Noel; neither Chief Potvin nor Seibel faced their would-be assailant, the case remains unsolved

On August 19, 1953, only months after assuming the mayoralty, the mayor and his appointed chief of police William H. Potvin received a death threat written as a crude ballot. The letter, written in a shaky hand, was received the morning after the murder of the leader of the local Republican committee, Alderman Henry H. Noel, in his home at 2am. On it, Noel's name appeared with an "X" along with the names of the other two. He, Potvin, and Seibel had received a number of calls in the early hours of the morning, made from public pay stations in the city and laden with profanity and threats. It was reported that leading up to his murder, Noel had been threatened by multiple people, including at least one who spoke broken French and at least one specifically blaming him for a recent shake-up in the police force. Several suspects in Noel's murder were rounded up and fingerprinted to compare with one lifted from a screen door at Noel's home believed to have been made during the incident.

After receiving the note, Seibel phoned the FBI branch office in Boston, which followed up with an investigation, as well as an inquiry by the US Postal Service. Unfortunately the message had been handled by several city officials and members of the press before being checked for prints. During the investigation, a disagreement arose between the FBI and USPS and the Holyoke Police, with the latter believing the threat was from a fraud and the former not discounting the notion that it had indeed been written in the hand of the murderer.

Chief William H. Potvin, the youngest police chief appointed up until that time, faced an increasingly tense relationship with the mayor in the year after Alderman Noel's murder

With the case remaining unsolved, by November 11, 1954, a rift had apparently arisen between Seibel and Chief Potvin, who had been the youngest appointed to the post when he had been installed on June 8 of the previous year. In Holyoke's city government, mayors effectively serve as police commissioners, appointing and negotiating the terms of the police chief's contract directly. During Potvin's own tenure under Seibel, he had refused to comply with several orders from the mayor, saying they were "unnecessary and inconsiderate", including one to place 1 patrolman to a car per beat. At the time when he forced out the chief, Seibel dismissed concerns that his removal was politically motivated, but the chief would not discount this. He would tell the Springfield Union the mayor had demanded his resignation "for the good of the service", and when he initially refused, a point he made explicitly in his send-off note to the officers, he was given a termination of employment notice within hours of his meeting with the mayor. Potvin was replaced on November 10, 1954, by Col. William H. McGarry, a retired National Guard veteran who was immediately sworn in by City Clerk Joseph Jubinville later that afternoon. McGarry had previously served as chief under Mayor Gregory J. Scanlon in 1927, then known by the title of "city marshal".

Neither Seibel nor Potvin met their would-be assailant, and ongoing efforts by Holyoke Police across state lines through at least the 1970s turned up no new leads; to date Noel's murder and the threats that followed remain an open case.

== Legacy ==
Two years after Seibel's death, the Holyoke Housing Authority dedicated a 40-unit complex of studio apartments in his name on the corner of Nonotuck and Hampden streets at the edge of the Highlands. His wife Margaret would subsequently sit on the tenants' association for some duration, and after more than 60 years and several renovations, Seibel Apartments still serves this demographic.

== Notes ==
Political offices
Preceded by James T. Doherty (acting)	Mayor of Holyoke; 1953–1957	Succeeded by Samuel Resnic
Preceded by Gerald T. Bowler	Member of the Massachusetts House of Representatives from the 13th Hampden District; 1951–1954	Succeeded by John J. Cavanaugh
