= Nathan P. Avery =

American lawyer and politician (1869-1947)

Nathan Prentice Avery
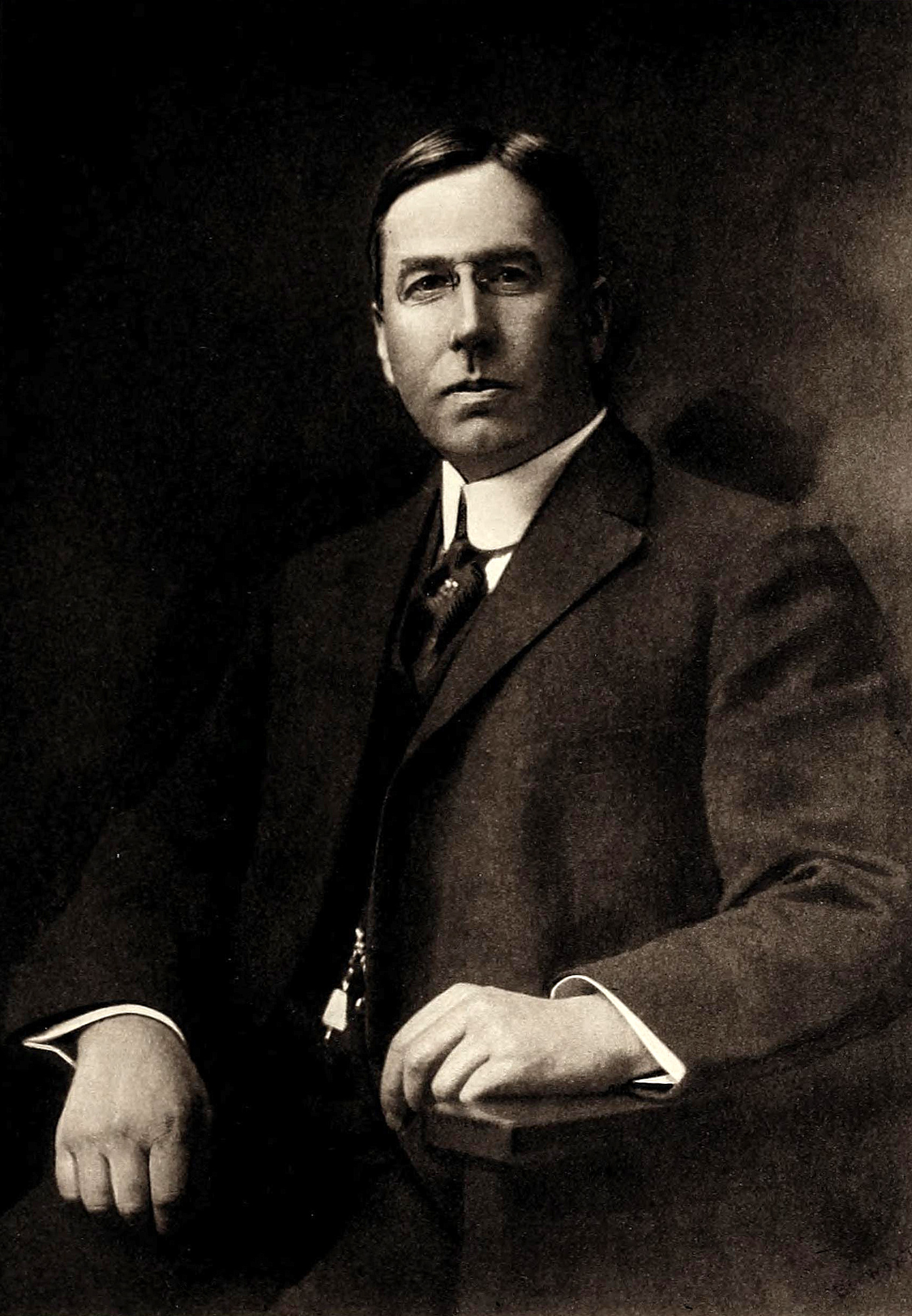

22nd President of the Massachusetts Bar Association
- In office 1932–1936
- Preceded by: Fred N. Wier
- Succeeded by: Henry R. Mayo

20th Mayor of the City of Holyoke, Massachusetts
- In office 1904–1910
- Preceded by: Arthur B. Chapin
- Succeeded by: John J. White

Delegate of the First Congressional District to the Massachusetts Constitutional Convention of 1917–1918
- In office 1872

Solicitor of the City of Holyoke
- In office 1899-1904

Personal details
- Born: March 13, 1869 Norwich, Connecticut, US
- Died: April 12, 1947 (aged 78) Holyoke, Massachusetts, US
- Resting place: Forestdale Cemetery, Holyoke, Massachusetts
- Party: Republican
- Spouse: Katherine Barnes van Valkenburg (m. 1897)
- Children: 2
- Education: Amherst College, 1891

Nathan Prentice Avery (March 13, 1869 – April 12, 1947), was an American lawyer, politician, the twentieth mayor of Holyoke, Massachusetts, a delegate for the First Congressional District to the Massachusetts Constitutional Convention of 1917–1918, and the longest serving president of the Massachusetts Bar Association. Additionally he held the longest tenure in the office of mayor up until that time, a record he would keep until the second administration of Henry J. Toepfert in the 1940s. Avery, present in many facets of civic life, was an advocate for an improved water shed management program through the Holyoke Water Works, writing about the importance of forest conservation in the New York Tribune in 1909. In 1933 the Hampden Playground between Hampden and Dwight Street was renamed in his honor as Avery Field. In his later years he remained an active member of the school board for more than a decade, was elected to the Massachusetts Bar for an unprecedented third term in 1935, and in 1939 was appointed by Governor Leverett Saltonstall to serve on the Judicial Commission of Massachusetts. Avery remained at his legal practice up until his death from heart failure on April 12, 1947.

Political offices
Preceded by Arthur B. Chapin	Mayor of Holyoke; 1904–1910	Succeeded by John J. White
