= Henry J. Toepfert =

American politician

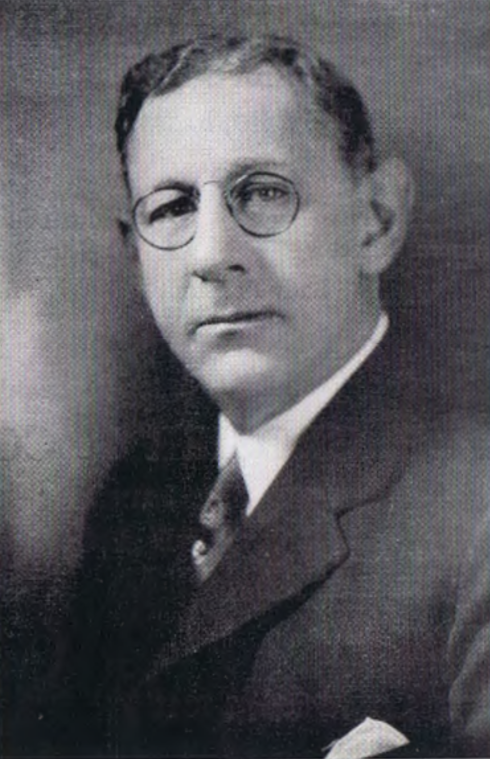
- Portrait of Henry J. Toepfert as mayor, 1944

31st and 33rd Mayor of the City of Holyoke, Massachusetts
- In office 1932–1935
- Preceded by: William M. Hart (acting); Fred G. Burnham
- Succeeded by: William P. Yoerg
- In office 1940–1953
- Preceded by: William P. Yoerg
- Succeeded by: James T. Doherty (acting); Edwin A. Seibel

Personal details
- Born: March 27, 1876 New York, New York
- Died: March 8, 1953 (aged 76) Holyoke, Massachusetts
- Resting place: Forestdale Cemetery
- Party: Republican
- Spouse: Minnie O'Connor

Henry Joseph Toepfert (March 27, 1876 – March 8, 1953) was an American businessman, inventor, politician, and the thirty-first and thirty-third mayor of Holyoke, Massachusetts, to date its longest-serving officeholder.

Entering work as a boy for the White & Wyckoff Manufacturing Company, he would remain with the company for more than three decades, later holding a board position as vice president and general manager. He was also an inventor, holding several patents in machinery, devoted to the manufacture of envelopes and stationery. First elected mayor in 1932, he would briefly serve as the manager of American Tissue Mills during the time he was out of office for several years with the election of William P. Yoerg. Upon his death in 1953, he was described as "universally liked" by the Springfield Union. The Holyoke Housing Authority subsequently named the H. J. Toepfert Apartments after him, and today a plaster model of a medallion by Jerome Connor bearing his likeness resides in the National Gallery of Ireland.

The H.J. Toepfert Medallion, presented to the mayor by sculptist Jerome Connor on August 24, 1934, and displayed in City Hall.
