= Churchill, Holyoke, Massachusetts =

Churchill
- Neighborhood of Holyoke
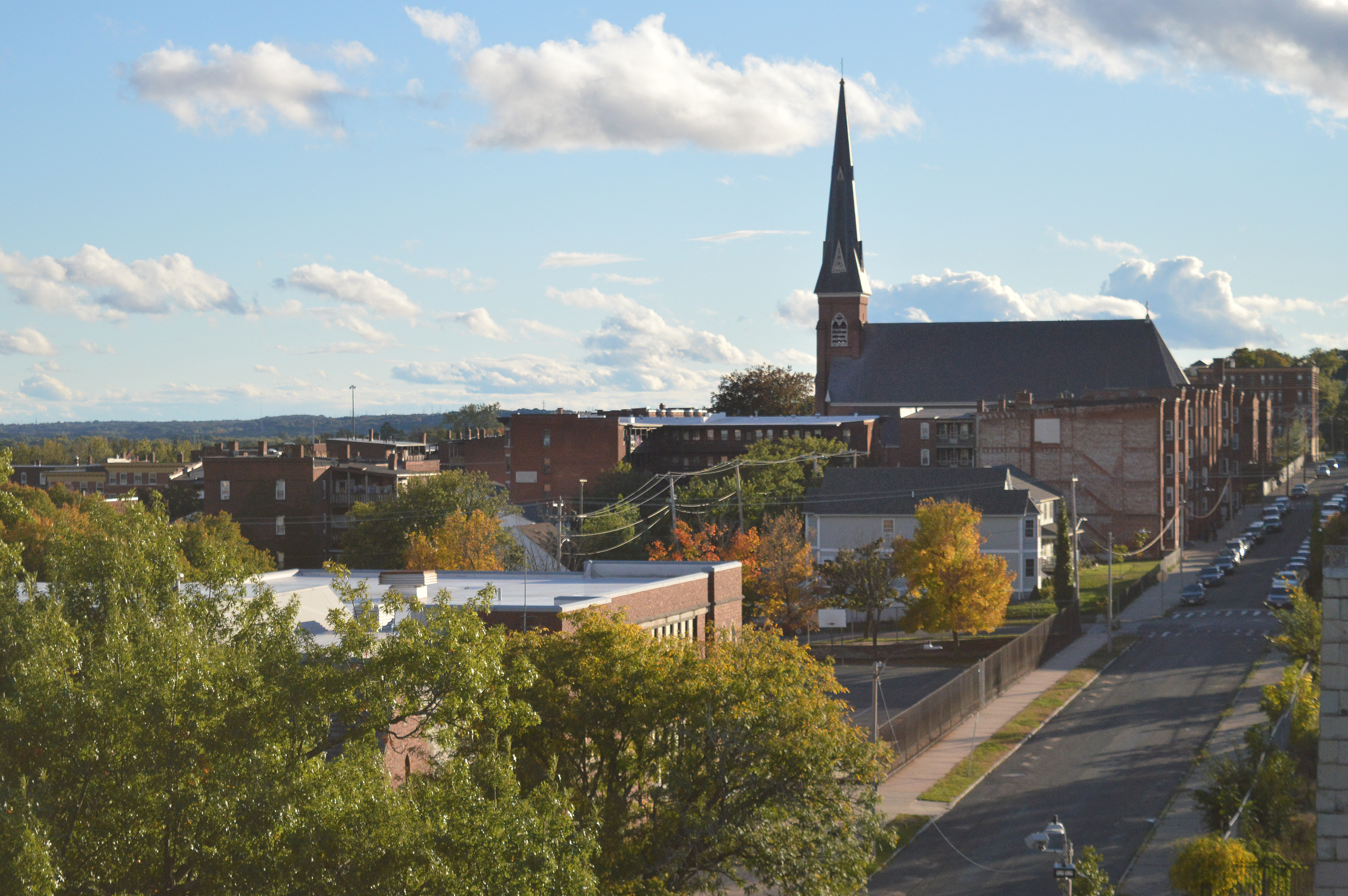
- The skyline of Churchill, with the prominent steeple of the Sacred Heart Church, the neighborhood's namesake

- Location within Holyoke Location within Massachusetts Location within the United States
- Coordinates: 42°12′1.9836″N 72°36′54.3636″W
- Country: United States
- State: Massachusetts
- City: Holyoke
- Wards: 1, 2, 4
- Precincts: 1B, 2B, 4A

Area
  - Total: 0.26 sq mi (0.67 km^{2})
- Elevation: 151 ft (46 m)
- ZIP code: 01040
- Area code: 413
- MACRIS ID: HLY.C

Churchill is a neighborhood in Holyoke, Massachusetts located to the south of the city center, adjacent to the downtown. Its name is a geographic portmanteau as the area was historically known as the Church Hill district prior to its extensive development in the early twentieth century. Located at the southwestern edge of the downtown grid, the area served as housing for mill workers in the late nineteenth and early twentieth century and today contains 166 acres (67 ha) of mixed residential and commercial zoning, including a number of historical brick tenements as well as the headquarters of the Holyoke Housing Authority, Holyoke Senior Center, Churchill Homes public housing, and the Wistariahurst Museum. In 2024 a section of this historic housing was added to the National Register of Historic Places as the Central Churchill Historic District.

== History ==
As Holyoke grew rapidly in its first decades, a number of tenements and worker housing was constructed on the grid's south side. Seeing this growth, one Father P.J. Harkins, pastor of St. Jerome's in Holyoke Center purchased a large tract of land at the corner of Maple and Sargeant Street. Within the year the neighborhood's most prominent church, the Church of the Sacred Heart, had its cornerstone placed during the American centennial of July 4, 1876, and over the course of the next two decades a rectory and school buildings were constructed on the adjacent land.

One of the most prominent secular community organizations of the early 20th century was the Churchill Athletic and Social Club, which maintained at least a baseball team, as early as 1904. Most commonly referred to as the Churchill Athletic Club (CAC), the group's football team, generally known as "the Churchills", would be local reigning champions among other teams in the Connecticut Valley leagues in 1916. Additionally the group maintained a club at 741 High Street prior to a fire in 1932. The Athletic Club remained an active organization in the community in some form as late as 1940.

The neighborhood was also previously home to an early development of the Holyoke Housing Authority, Jackson Parkway, a project of 219 units built in 1943 which at one time comprised a quarter of all residential units in the area. The project soon gained notoriety for its poverty and crime and in a HUD review of the project, it was described as significantly "isolated from the economic and social fabric of the surrounding community". Efforts to improve conditions were made, including the construction of a community center in 1977, now used by the Head Start program.

In 1996 the Housing Authority received a $15 million grant from the HOPE VI plan to redevelop the space entirely, and by 2003 the entirety of the Jackson Parkway project was demolished. Following the development of a revitalization project, construction began in 2003 on a new housing project known as Churchill Homes, built following the concepts of new urbanism to create space more congruent with the surrounding area's developments while granting low-income households greater homeownership; of the 202 units built, 100 are federally-assisted housing units managed by the Housing Authority, while the remaining 102 are occupant-owned. The project, emulating the surrounding neighborhoods' architecture, was completed in two phases, and received wide acclaim including a Citation Award for Design by the American Institute of Architects in 2002, and a 2003 Award of Merit in Housing and Community Development by the National Association of Housing and Redevelopment Officials (NAHRO). During the 2008 financial crisis, the Springfield Republican and Pioneer Valley Planning Commission lauded the project as one of Holyoke's most successful housing developments as the owner-occupied homes, marketed toward low-income families, saw a markedly lower foreclosure rate than Hampden County taken as a whole.

In June 2021 the Diocese of Springfield announced that Sacred Heart, at the time known as Our Lady of Guadalupe, would be merged into St. Jerome's in downtown center. The church had been unused by its parish since March 2017 after plaster had fallen from its ceiling. No plans were announced for the preservation or future use of the neighborhoods namesake church.
