= List of mayors of Holyoke, Massachusetts =

Mayor of Holyoke
- Seal of Holyoke

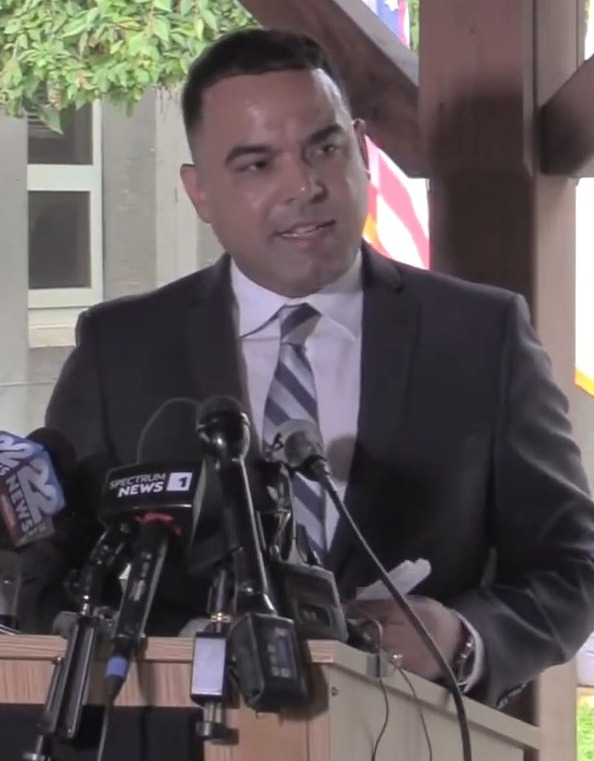
- Incumbent; Joshua A. Garcia since November 15, 2021
- Seat: Holyoke City Hall
- Term length: 4 years (2015-present); 2 years (1936-2015); 1 year (1874-1936)
- Formation: 1874
- First holder: William B. C. Pearsons
- Website: Official website

The mayor of Holyoke is the head of the executive branch of the municipal government of Holyoke, Massachusetts responsible for presenting an initial budget to the city council, and appointing key office holders such as the chief of police and fire commissioners.

Although members of both major parties have successfully run for office since the city's incorporation, elections for municipal positions are officially nonpartisan, on the ballot candidates do not run as members of any political party, nor require backing of one in any official capacity.

When Holyoke was incorporated as a city, initially the mayoral term given in the 1874 charter was for the mayor to serve a single-year term, being elected at the end of the municipal year. This was subsequently raised to two years during the mayoralty of William P. Yoerg in 1936, and from two to four years during that of Alex B. Morse in 2015. Mayoral primaries, in which the two candidates receiving the most votes went on to run in the election, began in 1959. Oftentimes mayoral administrations and mayors themselves are referred to interchangeably with the office space that each has occupied since the city's incorporation, "Room One".

Since Holyoke's establishment as a City in 1873, the following individuals have served as its mayor.

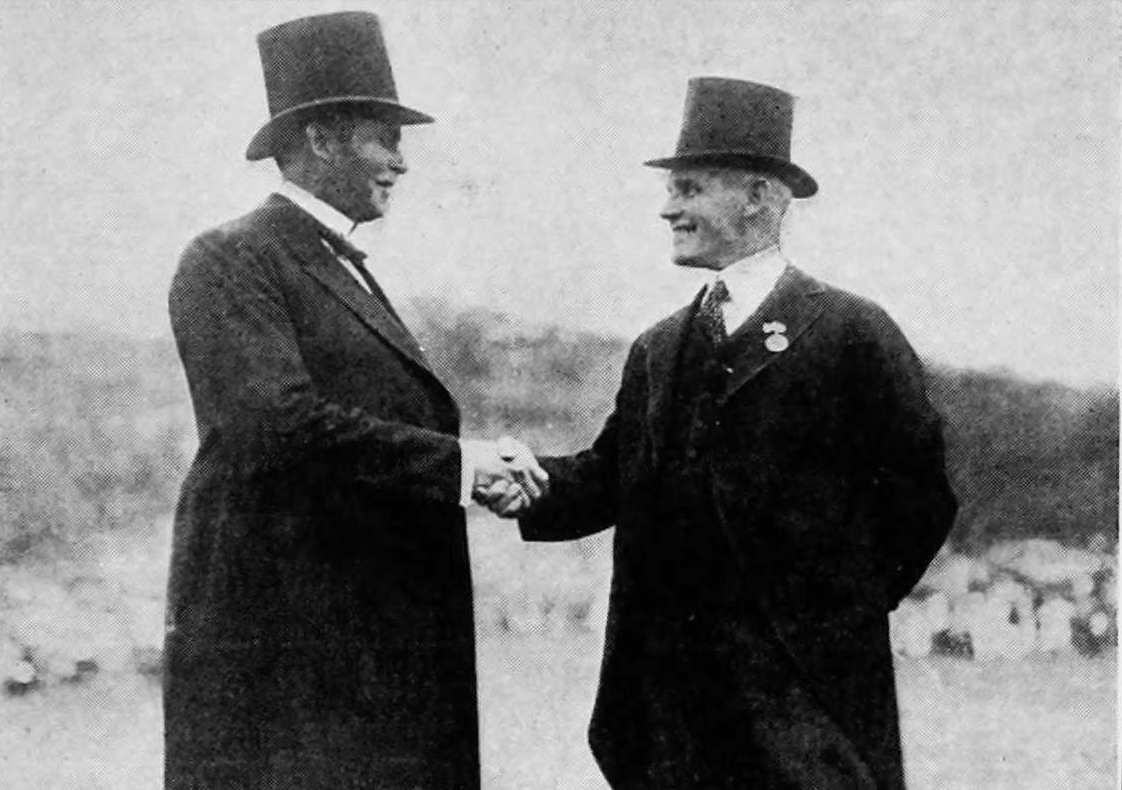
Mayor John Cronin shakes hands with George Pearsons, son of the City's first mayor William B. C. Pearsons, during a celebration of the City's fiftieth anniversary.

#	Mayor	Picture	Term	Notes
1st	William B. C. Pearsons		1874–1876	
2nd	Roswell P. Crafts		1877	
3rd	William Whiting II		1878–1879	
4th	William Ruddy		1880	
5th	Franklin P. Goodall		1881	
6th	Roswell P. Crafts		1882–1883	
7th	James E. Delaney		1884–1885	
8th	James J. O'Connor		1886–1887	
9th	James E. Delaney		1888	
10th	Jeremiah F. Sullivan		1889–1890	
11th	Michael J. Griffin		1891	
12th	Jeremiah F. Sullivan		1892	
13th	Dennie L. Farr		1893	
14th	Marciene H. Whitcomb		1894	
15th	Henry A. Chase		1895	
16th	James J. Curran		1896	
17th	George H. Smith		1897	
18th	Michael Connors		1898	
19th	Arthur B. Chapin		1899–1904	
20th	Nathan P. Avery		1904–1910	
21st	John J. White		1911–1913	
22nd	John H. Woods		1914–1915	
23rd	John J. White		1916–1917	
24th	John D. Ryan		1918–1919	
25th	John F. Cronin		1920–1925	
26th	Gregory J. Scanlon		1926	
27th	John F. Cronin		1927	
28th	Fred G. Burnham		1928–1929	
29th	William T. Dillon		1930–1931	
30th	Fred G. Burnham		1932	Died in office.
Acting	William M. Hart		1932	Acting mayor.
31st	Henry J. Toepfert		1932–1935	First elected in special election to finish Burnham's term.
32nd	William P. Yoerg		1936–1939	Did not seek re-election to become director of Holyoke Housing Authority; presided over Lyman Terrace
33rd	Henry J. Toepfert		1940–1953	Longest-serving mayor. Died in office.
Acting	James T. Doherty		1953	Acting mayor.
34th	Edwin A. Seibel		1953–1957	First elected in special election to finish Toepfert's term. Only mayor to serve concurrently as state representative. Died in office.
Acting	Samuel Resnic		1957	Acting mayor following Seibel's death; was ineligible to run to complete term.
Acting	Paul L. Brougham		1957	Elected in special election to finish Seibel's term; lost in concurrent regular election.
35th	Samuel Resnic		1958–1963	First elected term. Holyoke's first Jewish mayor.
36th	Daniel F. Dibble		1964–1967	
37th	William Taupier		1968–1975	Resigned to become City Manager of Lowell, Massachusetts.
Acting	Thomas Monahan		1975	Acting mayor.
38th	Ernest E. Proulx		1976–1986	
39th	Martin J. Dunn		1987–1991	Resigned to become a State Senator.
Acting	Joseph M. McGiverin		1991	Acting mayor.
40th	William Hamilton		1991–1995	First elected in special election to finish Dunn's term.
41st	Daniel Szostkiewicz		1995–1999	
42nd	Michael J. Sullivan		2000–2009	
43rd	Elaine A. Pluta		2010–2011	First female mayor.
44th	Alex Morse		2012–2021	Youngest mayor in city history (elected at the age of 22). First openly gay mayor. Resigned to become Town Manager of Provincetown, Massachusetts.
Acting	Todd A. McGee		2021	Acting mayor.
Acting	Terence "Terry" Murphy		2021	Acting mayor.
45th	Joshua A. Garcia		2021–	Holyoke's first Latino mayor.
