= Central Churchill Historic District =

Historic district in Massachusetts, United States

- U.S. National Register of Historic Places
- U.S. Historic district
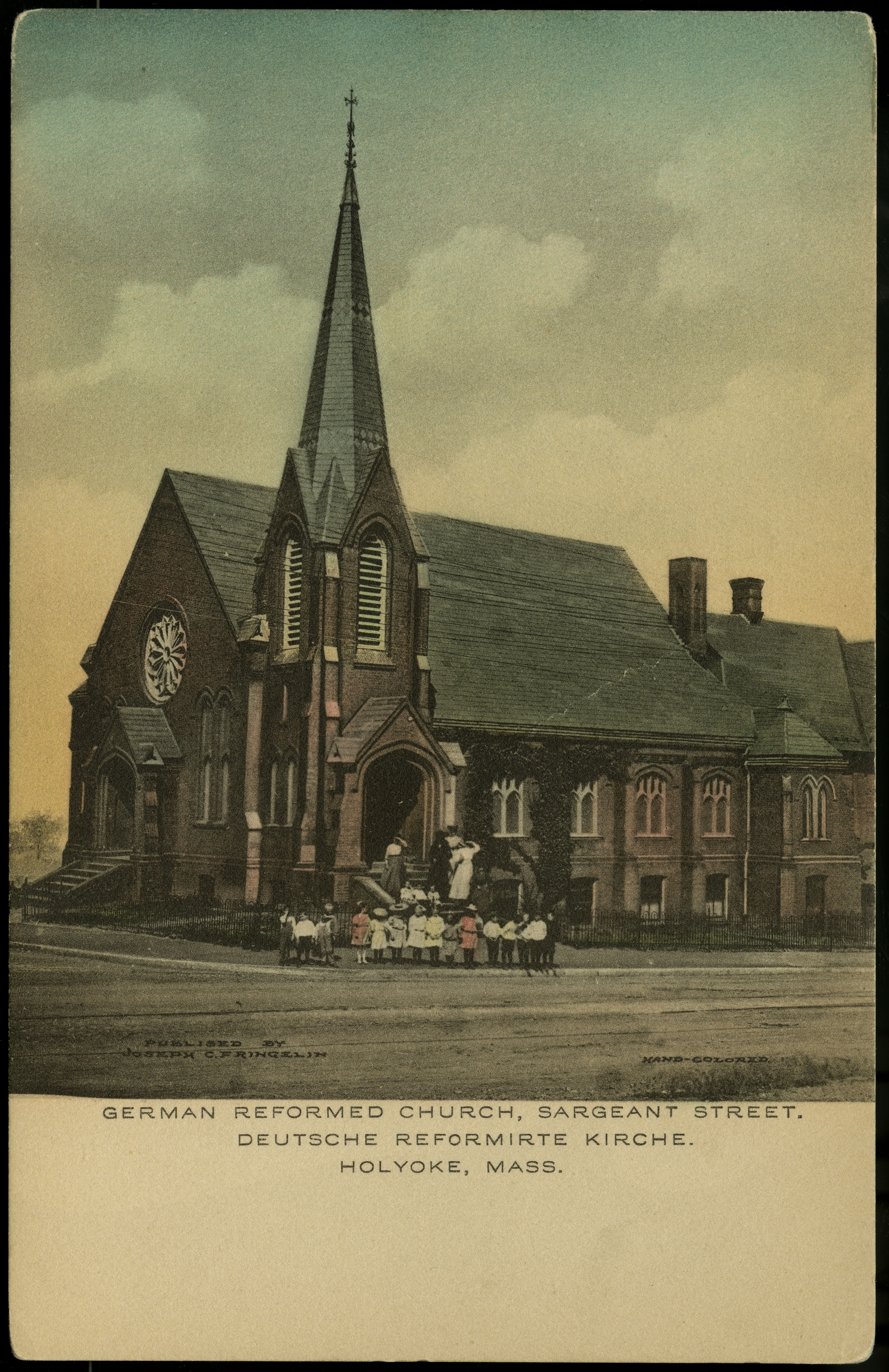
- Postcard view of the German Reformed Church

- Location within Massachusetts Location within the United States
- Location: Roughly bounded by Chestnut, Franklin, High, and Sargeant streets, Holyoke, Massachusetts
- Coordinates: 42°12′1.99″N 72°36′54.37″W
- Area: 7.93 acres (3.21 ha)
- Built: 1870
- NRHP reference No.: 100010564
- Added to NRHP: July 8, 2004

The Central Churchill Historic District is a predominantly residential historic district in Holyoke, Massachusetts. It is centered on the campus of the Church of the Sacred Heart, but consists mainly of apartment block dating to the late 19th and early 20th centuries. The district was listed on the National Register of Historic Places in 2024.

== Description and history ==
The Central Churchill Historic District is located roughly at the center of Holyoke's Churchill neighborhood, south of its main downtown area. This area was platted but not developed when the city was laid out in 1848. In 1870, the first major development in the area was the Church of the Sacred Heart, a Gothic Revival structure that was soon accompanied by a Second Empire rectory (1878). The construction of the German Reformed Church in 1890, also in the Gothic Revival style, led the area to become known as "Church Hill", later shortened to "Churchill". The blocks surrounding the churches and adjacent to Chestnut Street Park were heavily developed in the following decades with apartment blocks in a variety of styles.

The Sacred Heart complex occupies a city block bounded by Chestnut, Sargeant, Maple, and Franklin Streets, and forms the center of the district. It extends north to include buildings facing Chestnut Street Park on Chestnut and Sargeant Streets, as well as the German Reformed Church just northwest of the park. It extends east to include the west side of High Street to the east. The majority of buildings in the district are brick and stone multiunit apartment houses.

== See also ==
- National Register of Historic Places listings in Hampden County, Massachusetts
