= North High Street Historic District (Holyoke, Massachusetts) =

Historic district in Massachusetts, United States

- U.S. National Register of Historic Places
- U.S. Historic district
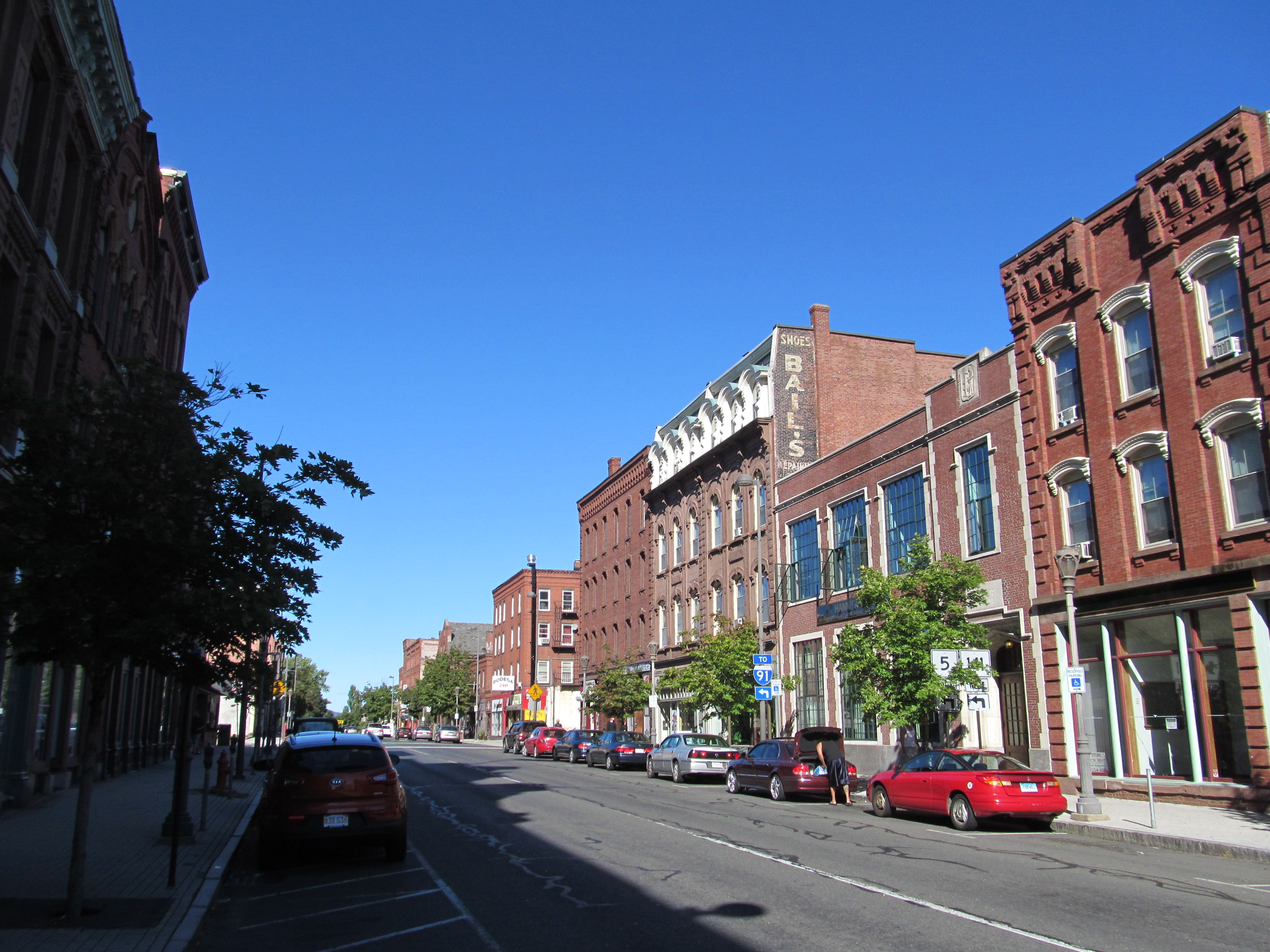
- North High Street

- Location within Massachusetts Location within the United States
- Location: High St. between Dwight and Lyman Sts.; also 233-411 High St.; also 580 Dwight St. and 230, 234, and 236 Maple St., Holyoke, Massachusetts
- Coordinates: 42°12′29″N 72°36′26″W
- Area: 6 acres (2.4 ha) (original size); 9.8 acres (4.0 ha) (1992 increase) less than one acre (2008 increase)
- Built: 1853
- Architectural style: Late 19th And 20th Century Revivals, Italianate
- NRHP reference No.: 86001376 (original); 92001725 (increase 1); 08000897 (increase 2)

Significant dates
- Added to NRHP: June 26, 1986
- Boundary increases: December 24, 1992; September 12, 2008

The North High Street Historic District is a historic district encompassing part of the downtown area of Holyoke, Massachusetts. When first added to the National Register of Historic Places in 1986, the district encompassed North High Street, between Dwight and Lyman Streets. This part of High Street was built between 1850 and 1885, and is lined with masonry buildings in Italianate and Second Empire styles. In 1992 the district was extended southward, adding three blocks of High Street between Dwight and Essex Streets. This expansions encompasses the growth of Holyoke during the height of its commercial success, between 1880 and 1930; it also includes the separately-listed Holyoke City Hall. The district was extended a third time, in 2008, adding a complex of three buildings at Dwight and Maple Streets that now houses the Holyoke Health Center.

Prior to 1847, the area that is now Holyoke was a sleepy agricultural area of West Springfield. In that year, investors from Boston purchased a mill privilege on the Connecticut River, on which they proceeded to develop the industrial sites that fueled the growth of the city. By 1880, Holyoke was one of the nation's major producers of paper products, and had a population of more than 10,000. Many buildings on High Street in the 1986 district boundaries date to this period of rapid growth, which was completely built out by 1880. Between 1880 and 1930 the area northeast of the early cluster of commercial buildings was developed, spurred by the construction of City Hall in the 1870s, and by the extension of streetcars line for the Holyoke Street Railway in the latter half of the 19th century.

== See also ==
- National Register of Historic Places listings in Hampden County, Massachusetts
- Caledonia Building, contributing property within the district
