= Dennie L. Farr =

American businessman and politician (1861–1909)

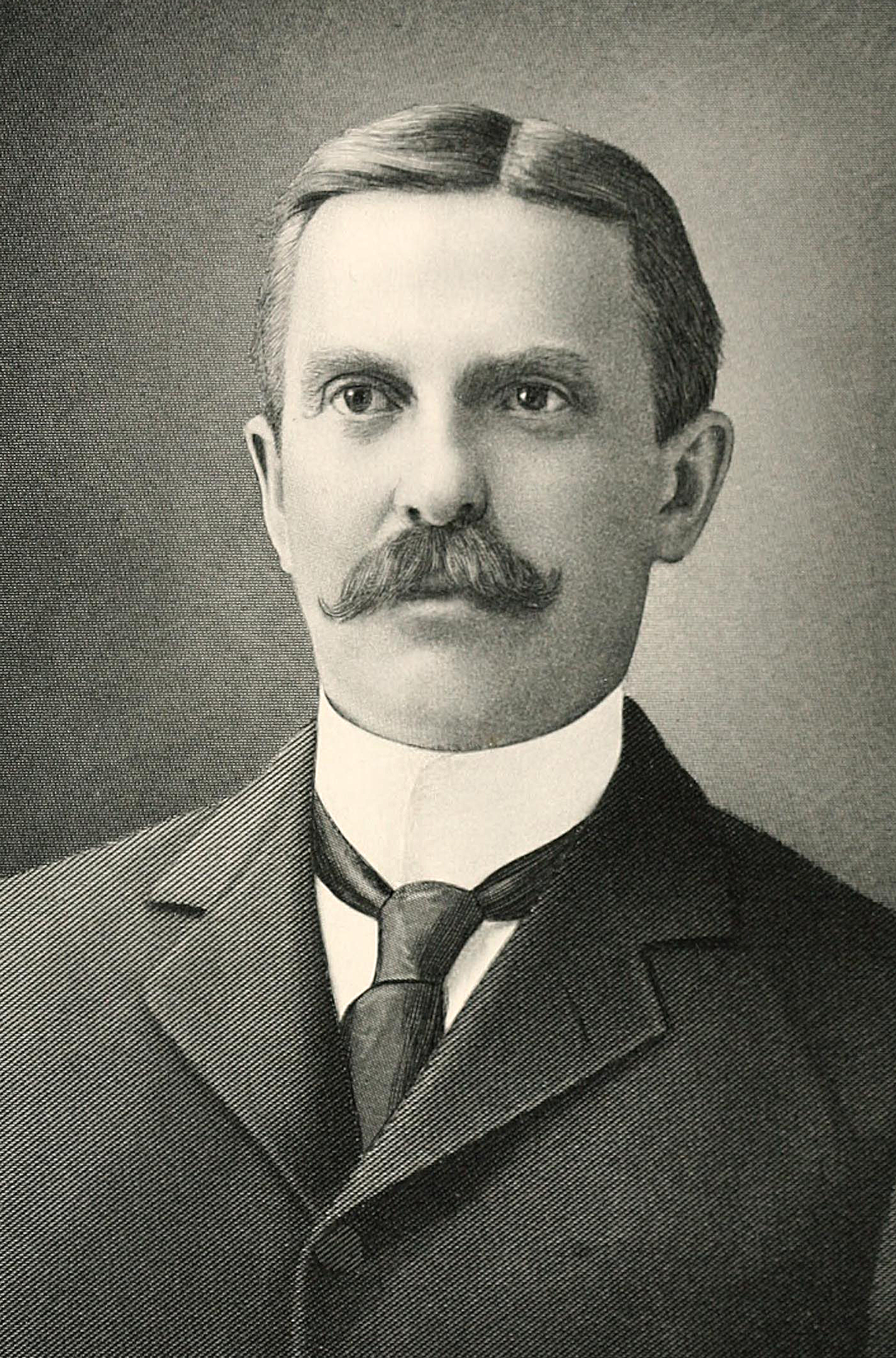

13th Mayor of the City of Holyoke, Massachusetts
- In office 1893
- Preceded by: Jeremiah F. Sullivan
- Succeeded by: Marciene H. Whitcomb

Treasurer of the City of Holyoke, Massachusetts
- In office 1890–1893

Personal details
- Born: November 29, 1861 Chesterfield, New Hampshire
- Died: May 18, 1909 (aged 47) Holyoke, Massachusetts
- Resting place: Forestdale Cemetery; Holyoke, Massachusetts
- Party: Republican
- Spouse: Augusta Schaefer (m. 1886)
- Children: 3

Dennie L. Farr (November 29, 1861 – May 18, 1909) was an American businessman and politician from Holyoke, Massachusetts. Born in Chesterfield, New Hampshire on November 29, 1861, to Lark L. and Mary (née Young) Farr, he attended school at Newark, Bellow's Falls, and Westminster, Vermont, and Swanzey, New Hampshire.

In 1879 he moved to Holyoke, entering the employ of the Farr Alpaca Company, a local mill founded by a cousin, first as a millworker and later in its offices as paymaster and subsequently assistant treasurer, managing the salaries of the mill's more than 1000 employees. On October 12, 1886, he married Augusta Shaefer of Windsor Locks, Connecticut; the couple had three children, one son and two daughters.

Farr took an active interest in public affairs; an active member of the local Republican Party, he was elected to the city council from ward 5 in 1887, and subsequently as an alderman of ward 6 in 1888. From 1890 to 1893 he served as treasurer to the city, and at the end of this term was elected mayor of Holyoke, serving in the latter for a single year term. The previous administration of Jeremiah Sullivan had received recommendation from a physician that new sewers were crucial to public health. While the previous administration determined requirements for the project, it was Farr's which worked with the Committee of Sewers and Drains to raise funds through bonds, and ultimately appropriate more than $300,000 for construction (equivalent to $8.1 million in 2016).

Workers standing next to large-diameter pipe during construction of new sewers, c. 1893

Bids were put out for more than 50,000 linear feet of piping and in all more than $229,000 was expended on the project in that year. During this time Farr presided over the construction of sewers for the neighborhoods of Elmwood, Oakdale, and Springdale, as well as two new school buildings. This work was especially important in that time, as only 20 years earlier in 1872, the city had the 2nd highest mortality rate in the Commonwealth and state health inspectors described many areas covered with "filth and green slime, [while] within twenty feet [tenants] lived in basements". In his closing report to the city, Farr released a "statement of work" for the year which was described by a reporter for Springfield Republican as a "novel feature" that "had not been done before". In the span of that year Farr reported that all construction of the necessary permanent improvements was performed without any overdraft from the treasury or suspension of funds. Farr himself later served as an auditor to the treasurer's office in 1896, and was also a member of the finance board of the local YMCA. Ever involved in public life, Farr was also described as an active member of the Mount Tom Lodge A.F. & A.M., the Holyoke Turner Hall, and the Holyoke Canoe Club.

Following a period of ill health Farr resigned from his positions in the Farr woolen mill in 1902. From 1906 until his death he remained connected with his family's business as manager of its bonded warehouse connected with the plant. Having been of ill health for several years, Farr died on May 18, 1909, in Holyoke at the age of 47 and was interred in Forestdale Cemetery.

Political offices
Preceded by Jeremiah F. Sullivan	Mayor of Holyoke; 1893	Succeeded by Marciene H. Whitcomb
