= Alex Morse =

American politician (born 1989)

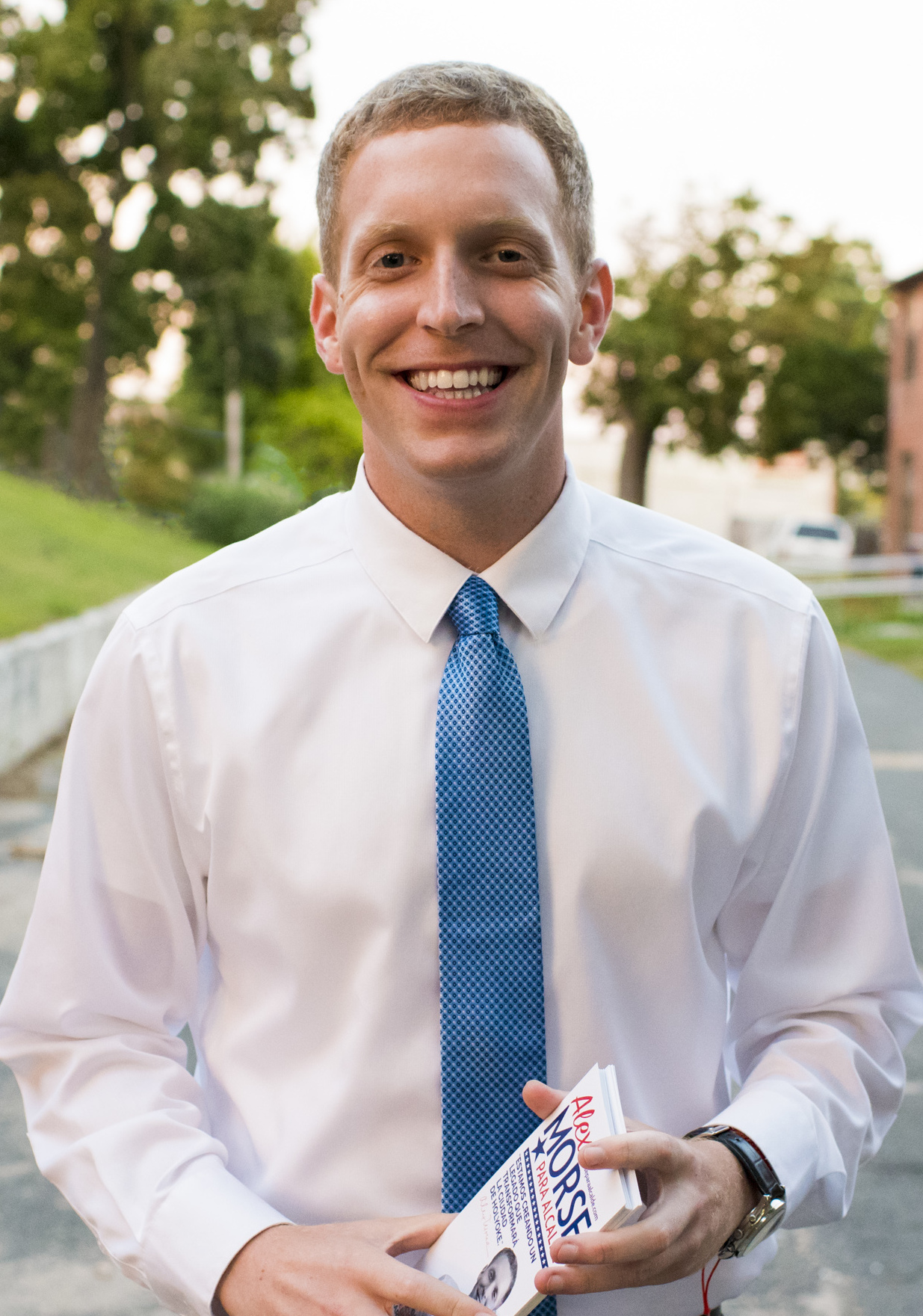

Town Manager of Provincetown
- Incumbent
- Assumed office April 5, 2021
- Preceded by: Charles Sumner (interim)

44th Mayor of Holyoke
- In office January 2, 2012 – March 26, 2021
- Preceded by: Elaine Pluta
- Succeeded by: Joshua A. Garcia

Personal details
- Born: Alex Benjamin Morse; January 29, 1989 (age 37) Holyoke, Massachusetts, U.S.
- Party: Democratic
- Education: Brown University (BA)
- Website: Government website Campaign website

Alex Benjamin Morse (born January 29, 1989) is an American politician who served as the 44th mayor of Holyoke, Massachusetts from 2012 to 2021. A member of the Democratic Party, he was elected the youngest mayor of Holyoke at age 22. He was reelected three times, with his final term expiring in January 2022. Morse resigned on March 26, 2021, to accept a position as the town manager of Provincetown, beginning on April 5, 2021.

Morse was the first incumbent mayor in Massachusetts to endorse the legalization of cannabis during a 2016 ballot initiative, an industry he has since sought to promote in Holyoke's economy, in tandem with information technology startups. In September 2020, Morse lost the primary for Massachusetts's 1st congressional district to incumbent Richard Neal.

== Early life and education ==
Alex Benjamin Morse was born January 29, 1989, in Holyoke, Massachusetts, the youngest of three children of Tracey and Ingrid Morse (née Powell). He took an interest in politics at an early age. In 2001, at age 12, he joined the Holyoke Youth Commission, a group that advises city leaders on issues affecting young people.

A graduate of the Holyoke Public Schools, Morse served two terms as student representative for the Holyoke School Committee and three years on the Massachusetts Governor's LGBT Commission. He was a participant in Upward Bound, a federal program that facilitates higher education in students from low-income families.

During his time at Holyoke High School, Morse formed a chapter of the Gay-Straight Alliance, and was the inaugural recipient of Boston's Parents and Friends of Lesbians and Gays Elsie Frank Award, a scholarship named in honor of the mother of Congressman Barney Frank.

The following autumn Morse entered Brown University, working part-time as an assistant for David Cicilline, the mayor of Providence, Rhode Island, and a future Congressman. Morse graduated in the spring of 2011 with a Bachelor of Arts in urban studies. In 2016, he completed Harvard University's John F. Kennedy School of Government program for Senior Executives in State and Local Government as a David Bohnett LGBTQ Victory Institute Leadership Fellow.

== Career ==
=== Mayoral elections ===
In January 2011, while in his final semester at Brown University, Morse announced his campaign for mayor of Holyoke. The previous summer, he had attended a three-day workshop in New York City hosted by Wellstone Action, a grassroots campaign training organization for progressives, and began quietly fundraising at the end of 2010.

Morse's election in 2011 at the age of 22 received national coverage, as he was the city's youngest and first openly gay mayor and, at the time, among the youngest mayors in the United States. He was reelected in 2013 and 2015.

In 2015, Holyoke's mayoral term was extended from two years to four, effective 2017. Morse was reelected that year, and is the first Holyoke mayor to serve a four-year term.

On December 1, 2020, Morse announced that he would not seek reelection as mayor in 2021.

=== Mayoral tenure ===
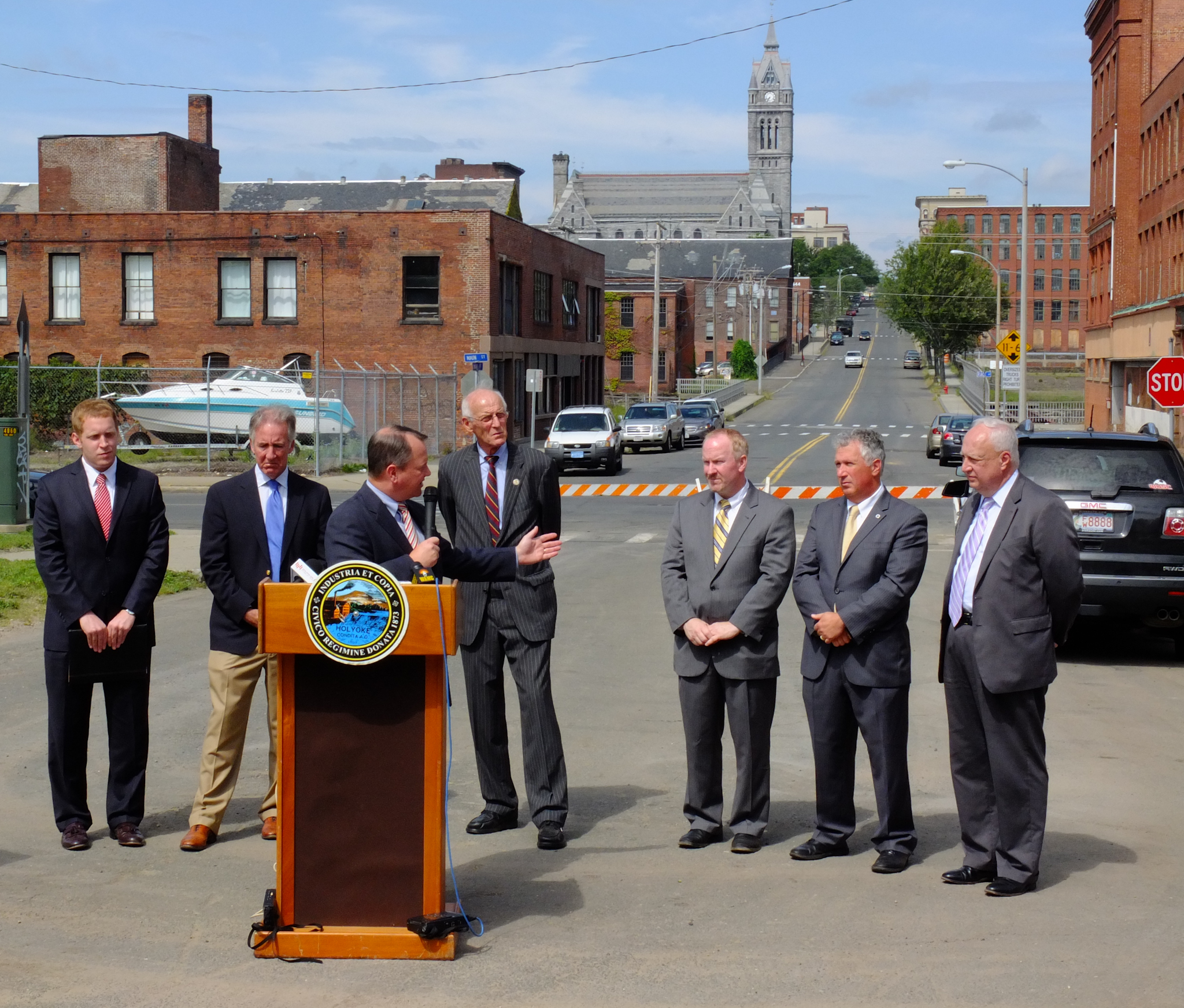
Left to right: Alex Morse, Richard Neal, Lt. Gov. Timothy Murray, Congressman John Olver, and others presiding over groundbreaking in 2012 for Holyoke station; a $73 million federal grant by the American Recovery and Reinvestment Act (ARRA) restored rail service for the first time since 1967

==== Cannabis industry ====
On August 1, 2016, Morse became the first Massachusetts mayor to publicly endorse the legalization of cannabis. Following legalization, Morse has encouraged investment of marijuana cultivation in the city, calling Holyoke "the Rolling Paper City"; he vetoed a 2017 moratorium the city council placed on recreational retailers.

Morse has attended several cannabis cultivation forums as a speaker, including several on the industry hosted in Holyoke. Among the earliest projects to open in Holyoke was a $10 million cultivation facility for Chicago-based Green Thumb Industries (GTI), which was operational by mid-2018. Several other businesses have since purchased facilities in the city, including a $3.2 million sale of a former American Thread Company mill to Trulieve, a company seeking to produce and sell retail marijuana at the site.

==== Casino ====
During Morse's 2011 campaign, a prominent issue was plans for a casino in the city, with then-mayor Elaine Pluta supporting such plans and Morse opposing them. In an October 2012 editorial, Morse elaborated on his position, concluding, "I oppose a casino in Holyoke because I have not given up on Holyoke".

On November 26, 2012, Morse held a press conference announcing his reversal on this stance, vowing to work with local businessman Eric Suher and others to build a casino at Mountain Park, with the city accepting a $25,000 payment from the developer for the costs of a review process. Facing backlash from supporters of his previous campaign against casinos, by December 2012 Morse reversed course and returned the funds, citing a "resounding voice against the casinos".

==== Education ====
As the chair of the Holyoke School Committee, Morse opposed state receivership before the 2015 state takeover, saying, "We should agree that local control matters, which is to say that a corporate takeover of our district or a charter organization running our district is not acceptable". Since receivership he has become increasingly supportive of state implementation, as public schools have seen marked improvement, with graduation rates increasing 20%. Morse has also publicly supported state expanded programs such as bilingual education, and the tentative construction of two new middle schools for a reported estimate of $132 million.

==== Labor support ====
In 2017, following a trial shutdown, or "brownout", of a local fire engine company, the International Association of Fire Fighters Local 1693 made a vote of no confidence in Morse, saying in a press release, "Chief Pond's continued reductions to the Department and practice of operating the Department at unsafe levels, all with the support of [the] Mayor". Morse has repeatedly affirmed support of the fire chief and denied the validity of these concerns, saying at a protest outside of a fundraiser that "the points that they're making just are untrue."

The Pioneer Valley AFL–CIO and the New England Regional Council of Carpenters Local 108 endorsed Morse in his 2017 reelection campaign.

==== Municipal finance ====
In 2014 the city council criticized Morse for refusing to disclose the reason for providing a $45,000 exit agreement to city solicitor Heather Egan, a year after her appointment. In response, Morse said in a Reddit AMA: "I do admit that I should have briefed the City Council before executing the settlement agreement with this former employee as to avoid issues of perception. Again, when faced with the decision to potentially spend hundreds of thousands of dollars in legal costs to fight frivolous lawsuits, or to execute a settlement agreement with funds that were already allocated in the budget, I chose the latter. Separation agreements are not uncommon in both the private and public sector."

Following the resignation of the city auditor in 2018, who suggested receivership and said he did not believe the mayor's office followed protocol, state auditor Suzanne Bump responded to a city council request stating, "I do not believe the circumstances in Holyoke rise to the level of warranting a state audit". In the previous month, a private audit by firm CliftonLarsonAllen found all city funds accounted for. Although Holyoke's government has a strong mayor–council government, Morse has called for finance-related departments to be placed under a chief financial officer appointed by the mayor and subject to City Council confirmation. The charter currently calls for the election of city treasurers.

==== Sanctuary city status ====
On November 19, 2014, Morse issued an executive order to the Holyoke Police Department, asking the department not to enforce federal civil detainer requests for holding immigrants suspected of being in the country illegally past the point they would usually be released. This codified a practice previously implemented during his tenure. The practice would not apply those who were registered as sex offenders, had previous indictments or convictions, or outstanding warrants.

Following a threat by the Trump administration to defund sanctuary cities in 2017, Morse reaffirmed this practice. Morse acknowledged that he knew of no instance where local police ignored federal immigration requests, and that the policy did not directly affect Holyoke's largest group of Latino residents, the Puerto Rican community, who hold American citizenship.

=== 2020 congressional campaign ===
On June 22, 2019, Morse announced his run for the U.S. House of Representatives against incumbent Democrat Richard Neal, to represent Massachusetts's 1st congressional district. He was later endorsed by the Justice Democrats, the Sunrise Movement, and Humanity Forward. Morse was defeated by Neal by around 17 percentage points.

In an August 2020 email, as part of what Morse and Out magazine later called a smear campaign, the College Democrats of Massachusetts alleged that Morse had used "his position of power for romantic or sexual gain". The email said that Morse had used dating apps to match with and contact students, aged 18 and above, at the University of Massachusetts Amherst, where Morse was an adjunct instructor. The political group disinvited Morse from any future events on campus. Morse responded, "I have never violated UMass policy". The local chapter of the Sunrise Movement voted to retract its endorsement of Morse, and the national organization announced that it would no longer campaign for him. Other organizations, including the Justice Democrats and the Working Families Party, affirmed their support of Morse.

On August 12, 2020, The Intercept published an article on chat logs shared with the publication, reporting that the accusations had been organized starting almost a year earlier as part of a sting operation by the UMass Amherst College Democrats in an attempt to aid Neal. The released chat logs discussed looking for Morse's dating profiles and how to lead him into saying incriminating things, and their hopes of gaining internships with Neal in exchange. The Neal campaign and the UMass Amherst College Democrats both denied having cooperated. Timothy Ennis, the chief strategist and former president of the UMass Amherst College Democrats, had taken a class with Neal and was highlighted as a driving force behind the allegations, with members of the group saying that Ennis saw Neal as his "in" for a political career. Former members of the UMass Amherst College Democrats alleged an "anti-Morse bias" in the group. On August 12, Business Insider journalist Grace Panetta wrote on Twitter that she had been contacted anonymously in April 2020 and that the names in the chat logs The Intercept had acquired were the same as those who had written her with vague allegations against Morse.

Massachusetts state senator Julian Cyr said the situation showed how "vague and anonymous allegations can be easily launched against LGBTQ candidates to destroy their campaigns". Journalist Glenn Greenwald expressed a similar sentiment, writing that the allegations were "old homophobic tropes" and calling the allegations a "smear campaign". LGBTQ Victory Fund political director Sean Meloy called the incident "a series of orchestrated political attacks meant to weaponize Alex’s sexuality and appeal to a homophobic narrative around the sex lives of LGBTQ people." On August 16, 2020, the Sunrise Movement resumed campaigning for Morse.

Further reporting by The Intercept alleged that the executive director of the Massachusetts Democratic Party, Veronica Martinez, coordinated with College Democrats before the allegations were made public, and that she "demanded records of her communications with CDMA members be destroyed" once the allegations were brought into question. Martinez denied the report. In response to evidence and allegations that party officials and elected representatives may have collaborated in originating and circulating the allegations for political gain, more than 50 Massachusetts Democratic State Committee members wrote that the organization's leadership "may have behaved unethically" and demanded an independent investigation before the September election into "what appears to be an unprecedented abuse of power".

That independent investigation found that Massachusetts Democratic Party leaders played a role in encouraging the students to send the letter, intentionally affecting the campaign and violating party rules.

An independent investigation requested by UMass found that Morse had used dating apps to "aggressively pursue dates and sexual relationships with students" but had not violated any school policy. It also found no evidence that Neal's campaign had had a role in the initial report and advised the school to tighten its policies on teacher-student relationships.

=== Town manager of Provincetown ===
After ending his tenure as mayor of Holyoke, Morse was unanimously chosen by the Provincetown selectboard to be the next town manager, replacing an interim town manager.

== Personal life ==
Morse is Jewish and openly gay. He was born to a Christian father and a Jewish mother. In 2012, Morse was ranked #9 in Out magazine's annual list of 100 most eligible bachelors; in 2013 the magazine ranked him #66. In response, Morse said, "I'd like to thank Out magazine for their recognition. It's always positive to see Holyoke highlighted in national publications."

Morse was a lecturer of political science at the University of Massachusetts Amherst from 2014 to 2019.

Forbes magazine named Morse in their 2019 30 Under 30 list for Law & Policy, citing his "initiatives include offering refuge to Puerto Ricans displaced by Hurricane Maria, encouraging legal marijuana businesses and restoring the city's downtown."

Morse's mother suffered from severe mental health issues and his brother struggled with drug addiction; both died during his mayoralty.

== Electoral history ==
Alex Morse's electoral history

Holyoke mayoral election, 2011
Primary election
Party	Candidate	Votes	%
Nonpartisan	Alex Morse	2,023	39
Nonpartisan	Elaine Pluta (incumbent)	2,022	39
Nonpartisan	Daniel C. Boyle	806	16
Nonpartisan	Daniel C. Burns	310	6
Total votes		5,161	100
General election
Nonpartisan	Alex Morse	5,121	53
Nonpartisan	Elaine Pluta (incumbent)	4,513	47
Total votes		9,634	100

Holyoke mayoral election, 2013
Primary election
Party	Candidate	Votes	%
Nonpartisan	Alex Morse (incumbent)	2,419	45
Nonpartisan	Jeff Stanek	2,249	42
Nonpartisan	Daniel Szostkiewicz	305	6
Nonpartisan	Jim Santiago	197	4
Nonpartisan	Daniel C. Boyle	190	4
Total votes		5,360	100
General election
Nonpartisan	Alex Morse (incumbent)	5,274	54
Nonpartisan	Jeff Stanek	4,425	46
Total votes		9,634	100

Holyoke mayoral election, 2015
Primary election
Party	Candidate	Votes	%
Nonpartisan	Alex Morse (incumbent)	2,694	43
Nonpartisan	Francis O'Connell	2,450	39
Nonpartisan	Anthony Soto	1,145	18
Total votes		6,289	100
General election
Nonpartisan	Alex Morse (incumbent)	5,429	53
Nonpartisan	Francis O'Connell	4,855	47
Total votes		10,284	100

Holyoke mayoral election, 2017
Primary election
Party	Candidate	Votes	%
Nonpartisan	Alex Morse (incumbent)	1,984	56
Nonpartisan	Jay Ferreira	992	28
Nonpartisan	Michael Thomas Siciliano	354	10
Total votes		3,330	100
General election
Nonpartisan	Alex Morse (incumbent)	4,557	58
Nonpartisan	Jay Ferreira	3,316	42
Total votes		7,873	100

U.S. House Democratic Primary, 1st Congressional District, 2020
Primary election
Party	Candidate	Votes	%
Democratic	Richard Neal (incumbent)	84,092	58
Democratic	Alex Morse	59,110	41
Total votes		145,136	100

Political offices
Preceded by Elaine Pluta	Mayor of Holyoke; 2012–2021	Succeeded by Joshua A. Garcia
