= 1938 Massachusetts gubernatorial election =

- November 8, 1938
- Turnout: 41.55% (total pop.)
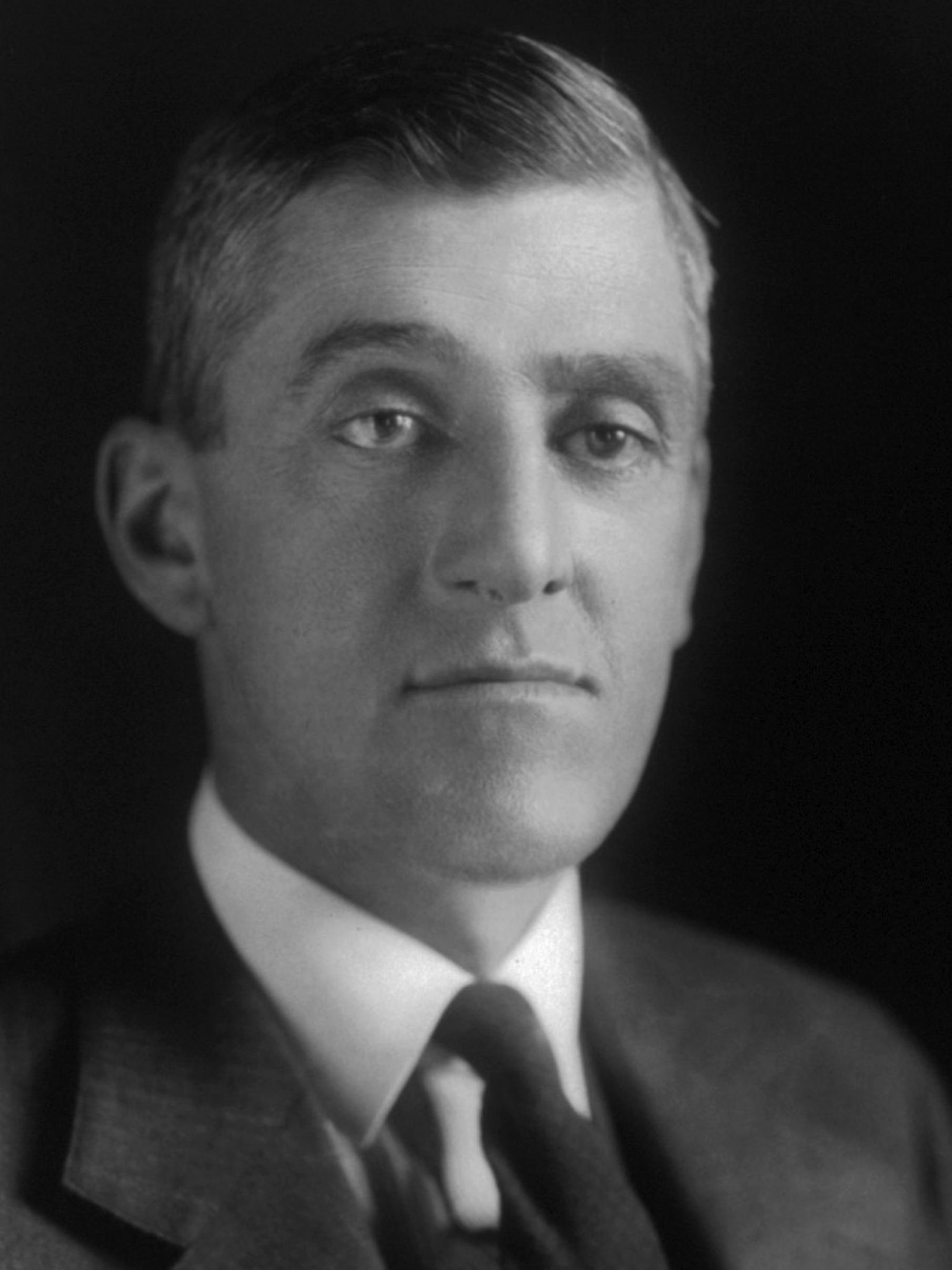

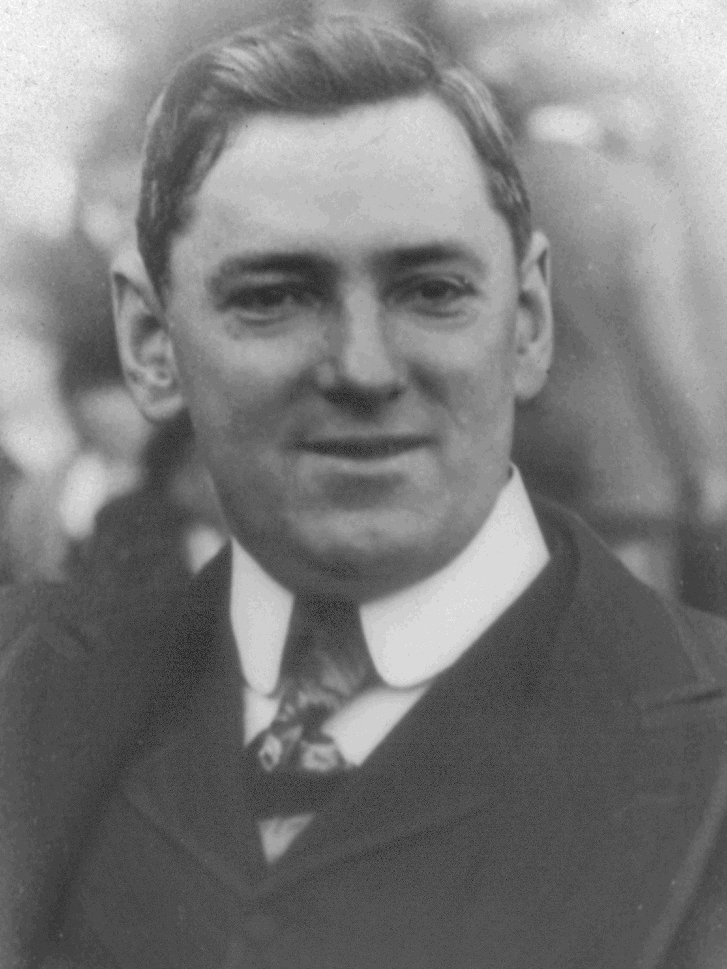
Nominee	Leverett Saltonstall	James Michael Curley
Party	Republican	Democratic
Popular vote	941,465	793,884
Percentage	53.32%	46.08%
- Saltonstall: 40–50% 50–60% 60–70% 70–80% 80–90% >90% Curley: 40–50% 50–60% 60–70% 70–80%
Governor before election
Charles F. Hurley
Democratic
Elected Governor
Leverett Saltonstall
Republican

The 1938 Massachusetts gubernatorial election was held on November 8, 1938.

Former governor James Michael Curley defeated incumbent governor Charles F. Hurley in the Democratic primary, but Curley was defeated by former Speaker of the Massachusetts House of Representatives Leverett Saltonstall in the general election.

Saltonstall's victory returned control of Beacon Hill to the Republicans after an unprecedented eight years of Democratic governors.

== Democratic primary ==
=== Governor ===
==== Candidates ====
- James Michael Curley, former governor, mayor of Boston, and U.S. representative
- Charles F. Hurley, incumbent governor
- Francis E. Kelly, incumbent lieutenant governor
- Richard M. Russell, former U.S. representative

==== Results ====
1938 Democratic gubernatorial primary
Party	Candidate	Votes	%
Democratic	James Michael Curley	210,286	41.13%
Democratic	Charles F. Hurley (incumbent)	168,161	32.89%
Democratic	Francis E. Kelly	101,978	19.95%
Democratic	Richard M. Russell	30,485	5.96%
Write-in	All others	383	0.07%
Total votes		511,293	100.00%
None	Blank votes	13,882	—
Turnout		525,175	100.00%

=== Lt. Governor ===
==== Candidates ====
- James Henry Brennan, former state senator and member of the Executive Council
- Edward T. Collins, member of the Executive Council
- Alexander F. Sullivan, former state representative
- Joseph C. White, state senator
- William P. Yoerg, mayor of Holyoke

==== Results ====
1938 Democratic lieutenant gubernatorial primary
Party	Candidate	Votes	%
Democratic	James Henry Brennan	139,653	30.50%
Democratic	Joseph C. White	132,716	28.98%
Democratic	Edward T. Collins	76,008	16.60%
Democratic	Alexander F. Sullivan	66,007	14.42%
Democratic	William P. Yoerg	34,221	7.47%
Write-in	All others	241	0.05%
Total votes		457,898	100.00%
None	Blank votes	67,277	—
Turnout		525,175	100.00%

== Republican primary ==
=== Governor ===
==== Candidates ====
- Frederick Butler, chairman of the Essex County Board of Commissioners and former state senator
- William McMasters, publicity agent for Charles Ponzi and candidate for governor in 1936
- Leverett Saltonstall, former speaker of the Massachusetts House of Representatives and nominee for lt. governor in 1936
- Richard Whitcomb, director of the Boston Survey Commission

==== Results ====
1938 Republican gubernatorial primary
Party	Candidate	Votes	%
Republican	Leverett Saltonstall	323,003	72.73%
Republican	William McMasters	48,133	10.84%
Republican	Richard Whitcomb	45,139	10.16%
Republican	Frederick Butler	27,739	6.25%
Write-in	All others	122	0.03%
Total votes		444,136	100.00%
None	Blank votes	24,993	—
Turnout		469,129	100.00%

Following his loss in the Republican primary, McMasters declared his campaign as an independent on the Townsend Recovery Act line.

=== Lt. governor ===
==== Candidates ====
- Dewey G. Archambault, mayor of Lowell
- Horace T. Cahill, speaker of the Massachusetts House of Representatives
- J. Watson Flett, chairman of the Belmont Board of Selectmen
- Charles P. Howard, Massachusetts state commissioner of administration and finance
- Kenneth D. Johnson, judge for the Quincy District Court
- Robert Gardiner Wilson Jr., member of the Boston City Council

==== Results ====
1938 Republican lieutenant gubernatorial primary
Party	Candidate	Votes	%
Republican	Horace T. Cahill	112,140	26.78%
Republican	Kenneth D. Johnson	93,538	22.33%
Republican	Charles P. Howard	84,477	20.17%
Republican	Dewey G. Archambault	52,358	12.50%
Republican	Robert Gardiner Wilson	38,920	9.29%
Republican	J. Watson Flett	37,329	8.91%
Write-in	All others	50	0.01%
Total votes		418,812	100.00%
None	Blank votes	50,317	—
Turnout		469,129	100.00%

== General election ==
=== Candidates ===
- Henning A. Blomen, perennial candidate (Socialist Labor)
- Roland S. Bruneau, of Cambridge (independent)
- Jeffrey Campbell, Black Universalist Unitarian minister (Socialist)
- James Michael Curley, former governor, mayor of Boston, and U.S. representative (Democratic)
- William A. Davenport, former state representative (Independent Tax Reform)
- Otis Archer Hood, candidate for governor in 1936 (Communist)
- Charles L. Manser, of Boston (Sound, Sensible Government)
- William McMasters, publicity agent and whistleblower in the Charles Ponzi case (Townsend Recovery Act)
- Leverett Saltonstall, former speaker of the Massachusetts House of Representatives and nominee for lt. governor in 1936 (Republican)
- George L. Thompson, former chairman of the New Hampshire Prohibition Party (Prohibition)

=== Results ===
1938 Massachusetts gubernatorial election
Party	Candidate	Votes	%	±%
Republican	Leverett Saltonstall	941,465	53.32%	▲7.24
Democratic	James Michael Curley	793,884	47.62%	▼2.66
Townsend	William McMasters	7,206	0.41%	N/A
Socialist	Jeffrey W. Campbell	5,691	0.32%	▼0.20
Socialist Labor	Henning A. Blomen	3,927	0.22%	▲0.01
Communist	Otis Archer Hood	3,488	0.20%	▼0.08
Independent	Roland S. Bruneau	3,400	0.19%	N/A
Independent Tax Reform	William A. Davenport	3,118	0.18%	N/A
Prohibition	Alfred H. Evans	2,046	0.12%	▼0.07
Sound, Sensible Government	Charles L. Manser	1,533	0.09%	N/A
Write-in	All others	111	0.01%	▲0.01
Total votes		1,765,869	100.00%	
None	Blank votes	29,820	—	
Turnout		1,795,689	100.00%	
Republican gain from Democratic		Swing		

== See also ==
- 1937–1938 Massachusetts legislature

== Bibliography ==
- Frederic W. Cook, Secretary of the Commonwealth (1939). Election Statistics, 1937–39. Boston, MA.
