= Holyoke City Hall =

US historic place in Holyoke, Massachusetts

- U.S. National Register of Historic Places
- U.S. Historic district – Contributing property
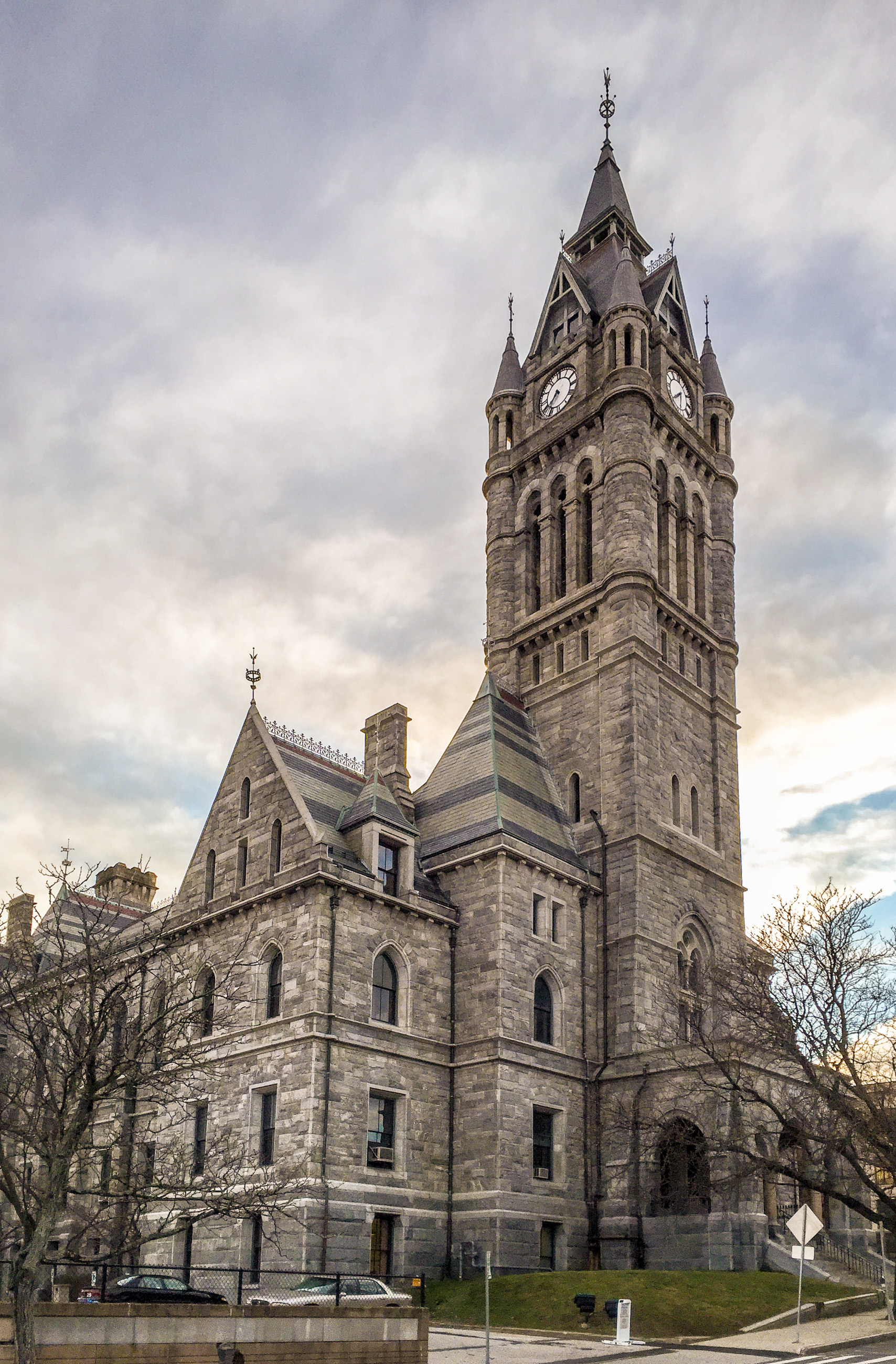
- Holyoke City Hall

- Location within Holyoke Location within Massachusetts Location within the United States
- Location: Holyoke, Massachusetts
- Coordinates: 42°12′23″N 72°36′28″W
- Area: 0.95 acres (0.38 ha)
- Built: 1871
- Architect: Atwood, C. B.; et al.
- Architectural style: Gothic Revival
- Part of: North High Street Historic District (ID92001725)
- NRHP reference No.: 75000259

Significant dates
- Added to NRHP: December 6, 1975
- Designated CP: December 24, 1992

Holyoke City Hall is the historic city hall of Holyoke, Massachusetts. It is located at 536 Dwight Street, on the south east corner of High Street and Dwight Street. Serving both as the city administrative center and a public timepiece for the industrial city's workers, construction began on the Gothic Revival structure in 1871 to a design by architect Charles B. Atwood. Difficulties and delays in construction were compounded by Atwood's failure to deliver updated drawings in a timely manner, and the design work was turned over to Henry F. Kilburn in 1874. The building was completed two years later at a cost of $500,000. It has housed city offices since then.

== Architecture ==
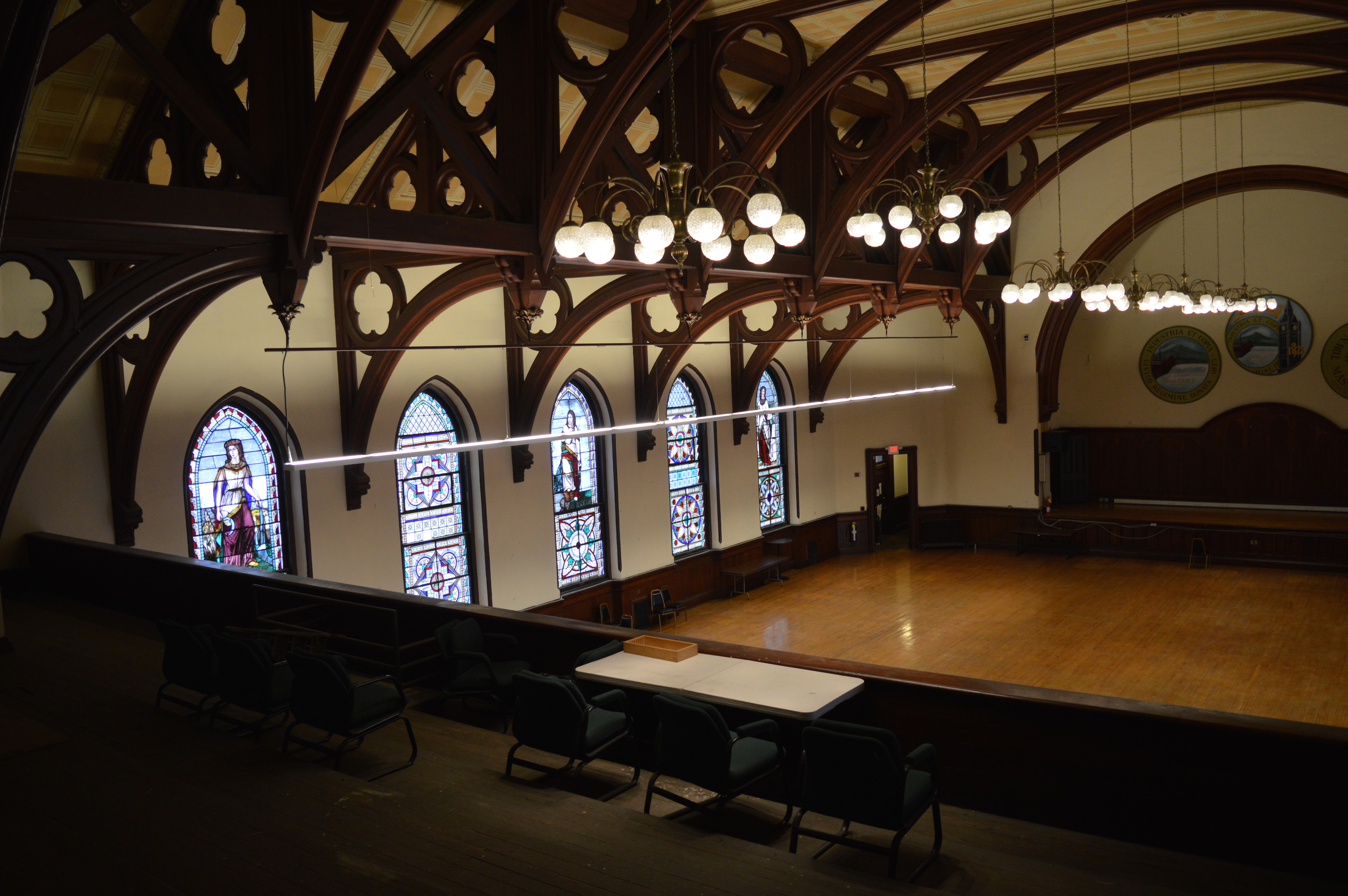
Interior of the grand ballroom, featuring stained glass windows by 19th century Boston artist Samuel West.

City Hall is a large stone structure in the Gothic Revival style, built with granite quarried in Monson. Basically rectangular in shape, it has transept-like wings on both long sides, near the ends. It has pointed-arch windows, and is structurally supported by Gothic buttresses. The roof is predominantly dark slate, with bands of red and green slate interspersed. The main tower is 220 feet (67 m) tall, and houses a bell weighing over 4,000 pounds (1,800 kg).

The building was listed on the National Register of Historic Places in 1975, and included in a boundary expansion of the North High Street Historic District in 1992.

=== Clock tower ===
Originally done in blackwood with gold numbers, which many onlookers found difficult to read, today the hall's large clock tower contains four faces of Belgium milk glass. The movement, a Seth Thomas no. 14, eight-day mechanism installed in 1877, contains all bronze components and is one of only three such clock movements sold by the company in New England. The 2.5 ton bell was cast in 1875 by the Jones & Co. Troy Bell Foundry of Troy, New York, and contains a custom-built strike movement as the bell sits on a separate floor from the mechanism and the transmission room where the clock faces and lighting sits. In the 1930s the clock was electrified with General Electric motors to raise its counterweights.

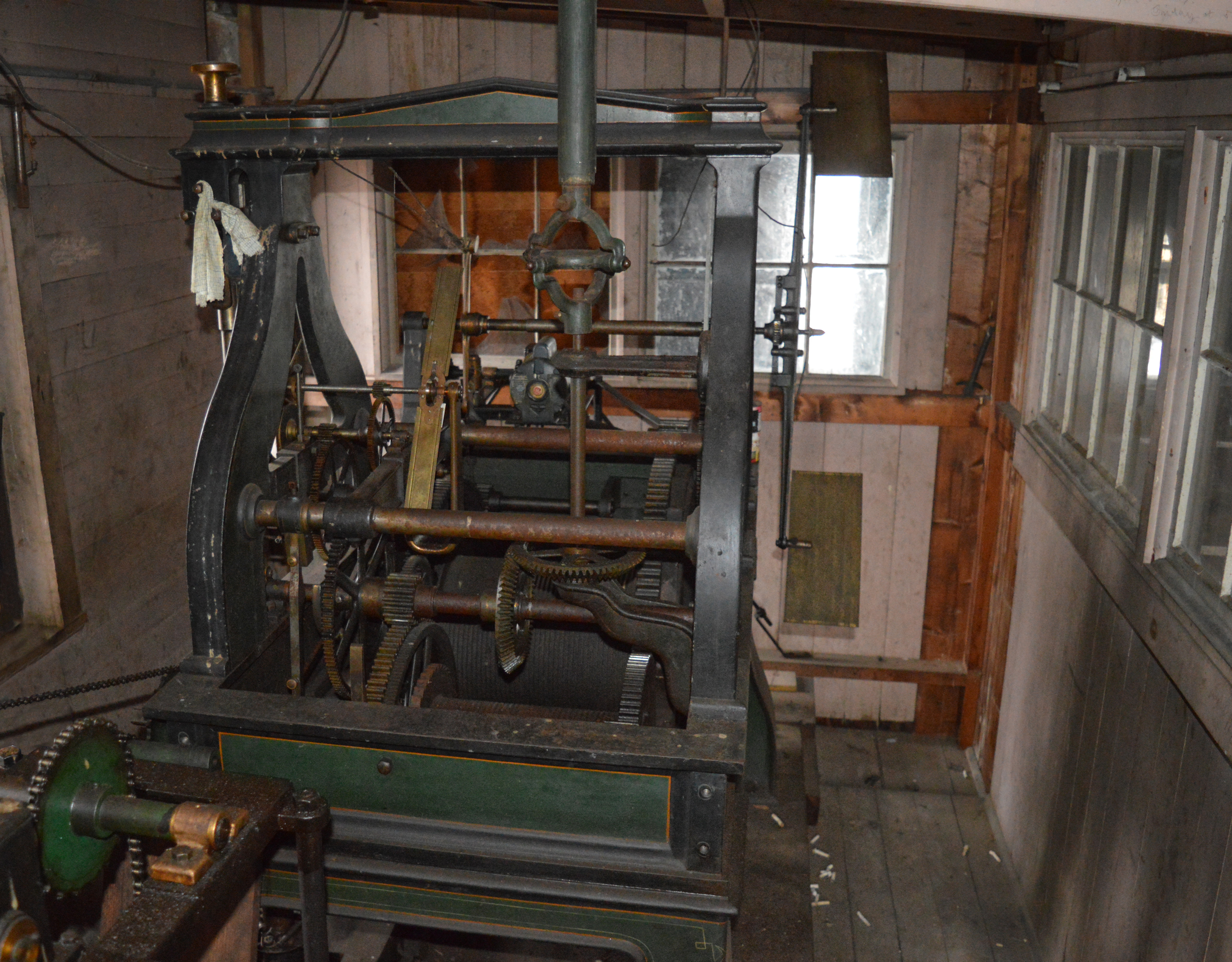
The Seth Thomas no. 14 clock mechanism, as it appeared in March 2018, prior to restoration

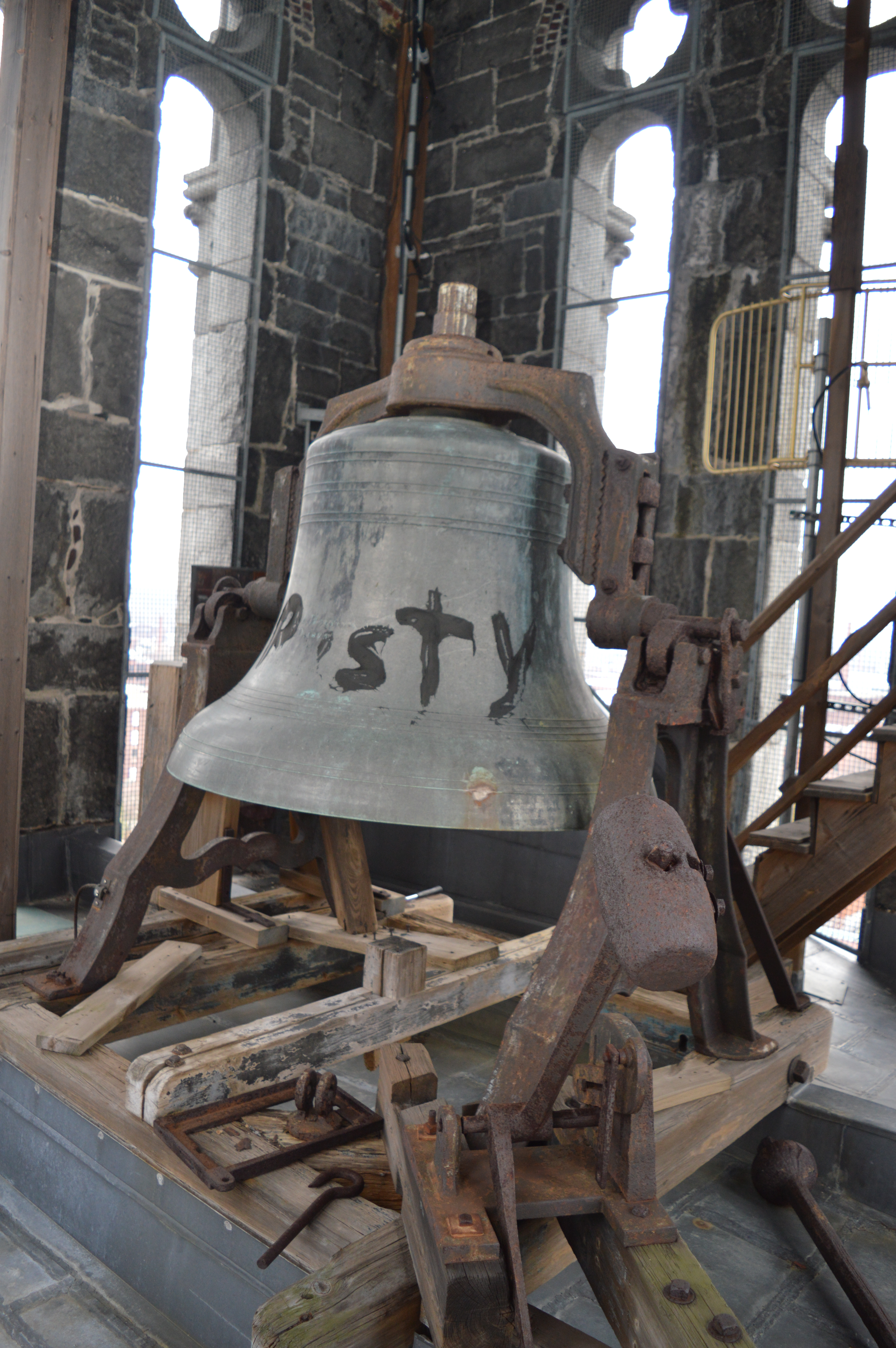
The 2.5 ton Jones & Co. bell in the clock tower, with the word "rusty" plastered in tar; the ringing mechanism does not function at this time

=== Stained glass ===
During the building's original construction in 1876, 13 stained glass windows were commissioned by the city and made by Samuel West of Boston. Three of these are located in the stairwells to the auditorium, including two rosettes, and a larger window with two figures- one representing Liberty, and the other a personification of the United States. In the auditorium are the remaining 10 windows, with 4 showing decorative patterns, and 6 showing figures personifying art, agriculture, music, commerce, industry, and water power.

== History ==
=== Design and construction ===
The construction of city hall was a multiyear effort, spanning six years. Its foundations were first laid in 1871 by stonemason John Delaney and his crew, who had also overseen the initial construction of the Holyoke Canal System. By December 17, 1874, the roof was reported as complete, and the building was sealed from the elements for the winter. By 1877 its tower was topped out and the clock's timekeeping mechanism was installed.

=== Early functions ===
During the late 19th and early 20th centuries, the building served as the de facto hub of the Holyoke Street Railway, as all trolley lines converged there, with zone fares based on the distance between that location and the system's various stops. From 1876 until 1902 the building was also home to the Holyoke Public Library until it moved to its current location.

In addition to housing city offices, City Hall's main second-floor ballroom has also been used as a public function space. It has been used for school graduation ceremonies, theatrical productions, dances, receptions for presidential candidates and foreign dignitaries, and from 1912 until 1926 annually hosted the New York Philharmonic as well as at least one such performance by the Boston Symphony Orchestra.

During his 1900 presidential campaign against William McKinley, orator and anti-imperialist William Jennings Bryan made a speech at the City Hall on his way to another at Harvard on February 3, 1900, greeted by a reported 2500-3000 attendees who completely filled the grand hall and corridors, with another 1000 said to be waiting to greet him on the lower floors. Bryan would return to deliver a second speech in the Hall on January 10, 1902, and later that same year on October 27, Mother Jones would deliver a speech about the coal strike of 1902. During a busy Massachusetts tour in his 1912 presidential campaign, Woodrow Wilson concluded a day of touring in Boston, Worcester, and Springfield with a campaign rally on the evening of April 27, 1912 in the grand ballroom, in tandem with speeches by Dudley Field Malone and Mayor Newton D. Baker of Cleveland. Though prior to his campaign for president, then-Assistant Secretary of the Navy, Franklin D. Roosevelt would lead a fundraiser for the American Red Cross in a packed hall in 1918. Following the legalization of boxing in Massachusetts, the grand hall was used for a time as a venue for hundreds of bouts, by the army and other promoters. City Hall's auditorium was also briefly the home venue for the Interstate Basketball League's Holyoke Reds, who played only for a few seasons in the early 1920s, winning the league championship in 1923. At the end of the Second World War the auditorium was renovated, but was kept as a basketball court from 1946 until these changes reversed in 1973 for the city's centennial.

On November 9, 1901, the Woman's Christian Temperance Union donated and dedicated a Temperance fountain modeled after the Gothic aesthetic of the City Hall building and made of the same Monson granite, which stands at the corner of Dwight and High Street today. The gift, costing between $1,500 and $2,000 at the time, was presented to Mayor Chapin by Mrs. Rosina A. Whiting, and was said to provide drinking water to originally be cooled in pipes by a chamber for ice beneath it. On its sides read two inscriptions from the Bible and one passage from Shakespeare's Othello, as follows-

O thou invisible spirit of wine, if
thou hast no name to be known
by, let us call thee devil. (Note: Othello, Act 2 - Scene 3)

I give waters in the wilderness,
rivers in the desert. To
give drink to my people. (Note: Isaiah 43:20)

He whose spirit is without restraint
is like a city that is broken
down and hath no walls. (Note: Proverbs 25:28)

In contrast, during the Prohibition Era, City Hall's employees, reportedly including mayors and police chiefs of the era, would access a since-razed speakeasy across Dwight Street through a tunnel connected to the building. Later accounts of P. J. Murray's, better known as The Bud, described this tunnel as located in City Hall's basement or on its grounds, leading to a series of passageways hidden behind the former bar's fireplaces. It is unknown when such a tunnel was constructed or demolished; The Bud however, would be razed in 2015.

A session of the aldermen was interrupted on April 29, 1930, while several councilors, as well as city employees, successfully extinguished a fire on building's roof started by high winds blowing embers from a large blaze in the Caspar Ranger Lumber Yard. Due to the severity of the other fires started across downtown, the public was evacuated and the roof fire had to be extinguished by hand, as too many hydrants were in use to provide adequate pressure for fire hoses.

=== Contemporary history ===
Up until the 1980s the clock's bell also rang on special occasions, including every two minutes during the funeral service of President Kennedy, and with one of the last times being during the re-lighting of the torch of the Statue of Liberty on July 4, 1986 by President Reagan. However increasing maintenance costs and maintenance deference kept the clock from running much of the time in the latter half of 20th century, with one of the most notable problems being the collapse of a sub-ceiling above the bell chamber in 1975. Until a grate was put across the belfry, damage from birds remained a persistent problem, with one notable repair attempt leaving mechanics to fight off a reported 1,500 blackbirds that returned to roost during one evening in January 1982. For several years the clock gears had also been lubricated with standard motor oil rather than a specialty lubricant, leading to the coagulation of residue on the gear teeth. One problem that prevented the use of the bell was the seepage of water into the wooden driveshaft case, causing it to expand and warp.

While the exact date the clock stopped regularly functioning is unknown, after about 30 years of being out of service the mechanism was restored in the Spring of 2018 by local steeplejack and arborist Dave Cotton, and a UMass professor emeritus of English, John Nelson, who worked on the clock of the Old Chapel previously. On July 4, 2018, the clock was restarted with new face lighting and repaired electrical systems, all from donated components and time. Due to problems with its mechanics, the bell however does not function and no immediate plans have been put into place to restore it in the foreseeable future.

During a town hall meeting held at City Hall on September 29, 2018, Senator Elizabeth Warren first expressed interest in running for president in 2020, saying she would "take a hard look" at the idea; Warren would later make her candidacy official in Lawrence, Massachusetts on February 8, 2019.

== See also ==
- National Register of Historic Places listings in Hampden County, Massachusetts
