= Holyoke Housing Authority =

Public housing agency in Holyoke, Massachusetts

Agency overview
- Formed: April 5, 1938
- Jurisdiction: Holyoke, Massachusetts
- Headquarters: 475 Maple Street, Holyoke, MA 01040
- Annual budget: $23.1 million
- Agency executive: Matthew Mainville (2013–), Executive Director
- Website: holyokehousing.org

The Holyoke Housing Authority (HHA) is a public agency of the city of Holyoke, Massachusetts that provides subsidized public housing to low- and moderate-income families and individuals.

In the federal government model of the United States Department of Housing and Urban Development (HUD), HHA is a public housing agency. As such, HHA administers federal government assistance programs and monies for locally subsidized housing.

The Housing Authority owns and operates 12 developments, which contain 821 housing units. These include Beaudoin Village, Lyman Terrace, Toepfert Apartments, Churchill Homes, Zielinski Apartments, Coughlin Apartments, Beaudry-Boucher Apartments, Falcetti Apartments, Rosary Towers, the Murphy Congregate House, and Seibel Apartments. In addition to these sites, the agency also administers 1,400 Section 8 Housing Choice Vouchers for housing units in the private market.

The agency is overseen by a 5-member board of commissioners. Four of the commissioners are appointed by the mayor and one commissioner is appointed by the Governor. Each year the HHA awards two scholarships through the Holyoke Community College Foundation to eligible students who are residents of public housing or Section 8 leased properties, meeting the required 12 credit enrollment for full-time students, and 6 credits for nontraditional students.
