= Blanchet =

Blanchet is a French surname. Notable people with the surname include:

- Abbé François Blanchet (1707–1784), French littérateur
- Augustin-Magloire Blanchet (1797–1887), first Bishop of Walla Walla and Nesqually (Washington); brother of François Norbert
- Bertrand Blanchet (1932–2025), Canadian Catholic prelate
- Emile-Robert Blanchet (1877–1943), Swiss-born, French-settled pianist and composer
- François Blanchet (disambiguation)
- Jean Blanchet (watchmaker), Swiss watchmaker, founder of Manufacture d'Horologerie Blanchet & Cie
- Joseph-Goderic Blanchet (1820–1890), Canadian physician and politician
- Luz Blanchet (born 1966), Mexican TV host
- Madeleine Blanchet (born 1934), Canadian physician
- Yves-François Blanchet (born 1965), Canadian politician
- Karl Blanchet (born 1969), Professor in Public Health

== Other uses ==
- Blanchet (watch), luxury Swiss watch brand, belong to D Group
- Blanchet (harpsichord makers), a family of harpsichord and piano makers
- Mount Blanchet Provincial Park in northwestern British Columbia is named for George Blanchet
