= Yale University Collection of Musical Instruments =

Coordinates: 41.3124°N 72.9237°W

Yale Morris Steinert Collection of Musical Instruments
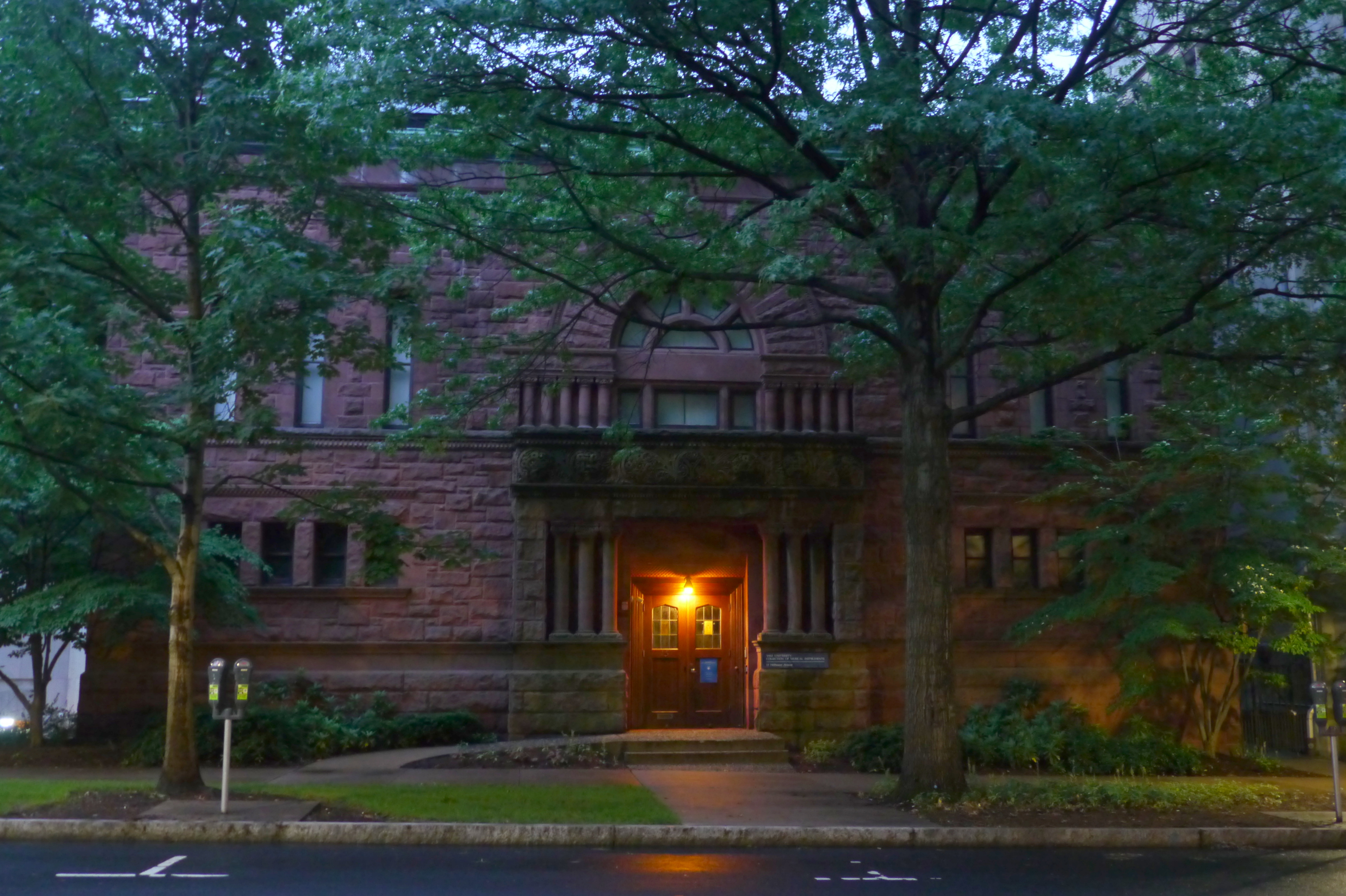
- Established: 1900
- Location: New Haven, Connecticut
- Type: Instrument museum
- Curators: Susan E. Thompson; Christina Linsenmeyer
- Website: collection.yale.edu

The Yale Morris Steinert Collection of Musical Instruments, a division of the Yale School of Music, is a museum in New Haven, Connecticut. It was established in 1900 by a gift of historic keyboard instruments from Morris Steinert, and later enriched in 1960 and 1962 by the acquisition of the Belle Skinner and Emil Herrmann collections. Initially housed under the dome of Woolsey Hall, it was moved in 1961 to a historic Romanesque structure on Hillhouse Avenue, constructed in 1895 for the Alpha Delta Phi fraternity.

== Collections ==
Highlights from the museum's holdings include keyboard instruments from six centuries, featuring an organ by John Snetzler (London, 1742), harpsichords by Ruckers (Antwerp, 1640), Blanchet (Paris, c. 1740), and Taskin (Paris, 1770), a clavichord by Hoffman (Ronneburg, 1784), and pianos by Könnicke (Vienna, c. 1795), Boesendorfer (Vienna, c. 1830), and Érard (Paris, 1883). The Collection possesses stringed instruments by Antonio Stradivari, Pietro Giovanni and Andrea Guarneri, Antonio and Nicolò Amati, and Jacob Stainer. Also included are a number of historical wind instruments, world instruments, and a large collection of bells given in 1975 by Robyna Neilson Ketchum.

The Collection maintains permanent exhibits, regularly mounts special exhibitions, and is open to the public during regular visiting hours. In addition to presentations made to Yale classes, the Collection offers tours and lecture-demonstrations to school and private groups by appointment.

== Concerts ==
The annual concert series presented by the Collection of Musical Instruments features performers of music in its historical context, often using the appropriate instruments from the Collection that have been restored to playing condition. Performers and ensembles that have appeared on the concert series include: The Alarius Ensemble, Malcolm Bilson, Anner Bylsma, The Flanders Quartet, John Holloway, Monica Huggett, Ralph Kirkpatrick, Jeanne Lamon, Gustav Leonhardt, Amsterdam Loeki Stardust Quartet, Paul O'Dette, London Baroque, Steven Lubin, Paolo Pandolfo, Phantasm, Stanley Ritchie, Jaap Schroeder, Fernando Valenti, and Marion Verbruggen. Also presented in the series is the Collection's resident ensemble, the Yale Baroque Ensemble, directed by Robert Mealy.

== See also ==
- List of music museums
- Wistariahurst § Music Room era, first exhibition of the Belle Skinner instruments
