= Jean Blanchet =

Jean Blanchet may refer to:

- Jean Blanchet (Quebec politician) (1843–1908), Conservative leader of the Opposition in the Legislative Assembly of Quebec
- Jean Blanchet (physician) (1795–1857), physician and political figure in Canada East.
- Jean Blanchet (watchmaker) (died 1852), Swiss watchmaker
- Jean-Baptiste Blanchet (1842–1904), Canadian politician
- Jean Blanchet (aircraft constructor), see List of aircraft (Bf–Bo)
