= Blanchet (watch) =

- Industry: Watch manufacturing
- Founded: 1819
- Founder: Jean Blanchet
- Headquarters: Switzerland
- Products: Wristwatches, Accessories
- Owner: D Group
- Website: www.blanchetwatches.com

Blanchet is an historic watch brand stated in Switzerland in 1819 by Jean Blanchet. The current owner of Blanchet is the D Group, which relaunched the brand in 2010.

== History ==
Jean Blanchet was a Swiss watchmaker who grew up in France (Lyon) where his father Pierre Blanchet owned a small watch dial factory. Since youth, Jean Blanchet was fascinated by the French and Swiss watches tradition. He launch his own watch manufacturing in 1789. From the first steps his company had a cross-border success all over the old continent.

In 1828 Jean Blanchet married Laura Wilson, the daughter of an English ambassador. One year later she gave birth to their son Yves Blanchet. In the age of 20 he decided to go to the Royal School of watchmaking (Ecole Royale de l'Horlogerie de Cluses).

Yves took over the company in 1852, when Jean died during an accident. Four years later he moved close to the Lake of Geneva, in Coppet, to perfection his watchmaking technique and start his own business "Manufacture d'Horologerie Blanchet & Cie".

Jean Blanchet owned some vineyards in Haute-Savoie near Geneva. He usually used to say "...designing and create a watch is similar to cultivate a vineyard..."

== Notable owners ==
Among the admirers of Blanchet watches there were some important historical figures. Napoleon III commissioned some models as present for French Army officers.

British Prime Minister William Ewart Gladstone showed his Blanchet timepiece to Camillo Benso, count of Cavour, the leading figure in the movement toward Italian unification.

== See also ==
- ADINA Watches
- Carlo Ferrara
- List of Swiss watch manufacturers
