= Puerto Ricans in Holyoke, Massachusetts =

Puerto Ricans in Holyoke
Los puertorriqueños de Holyoke
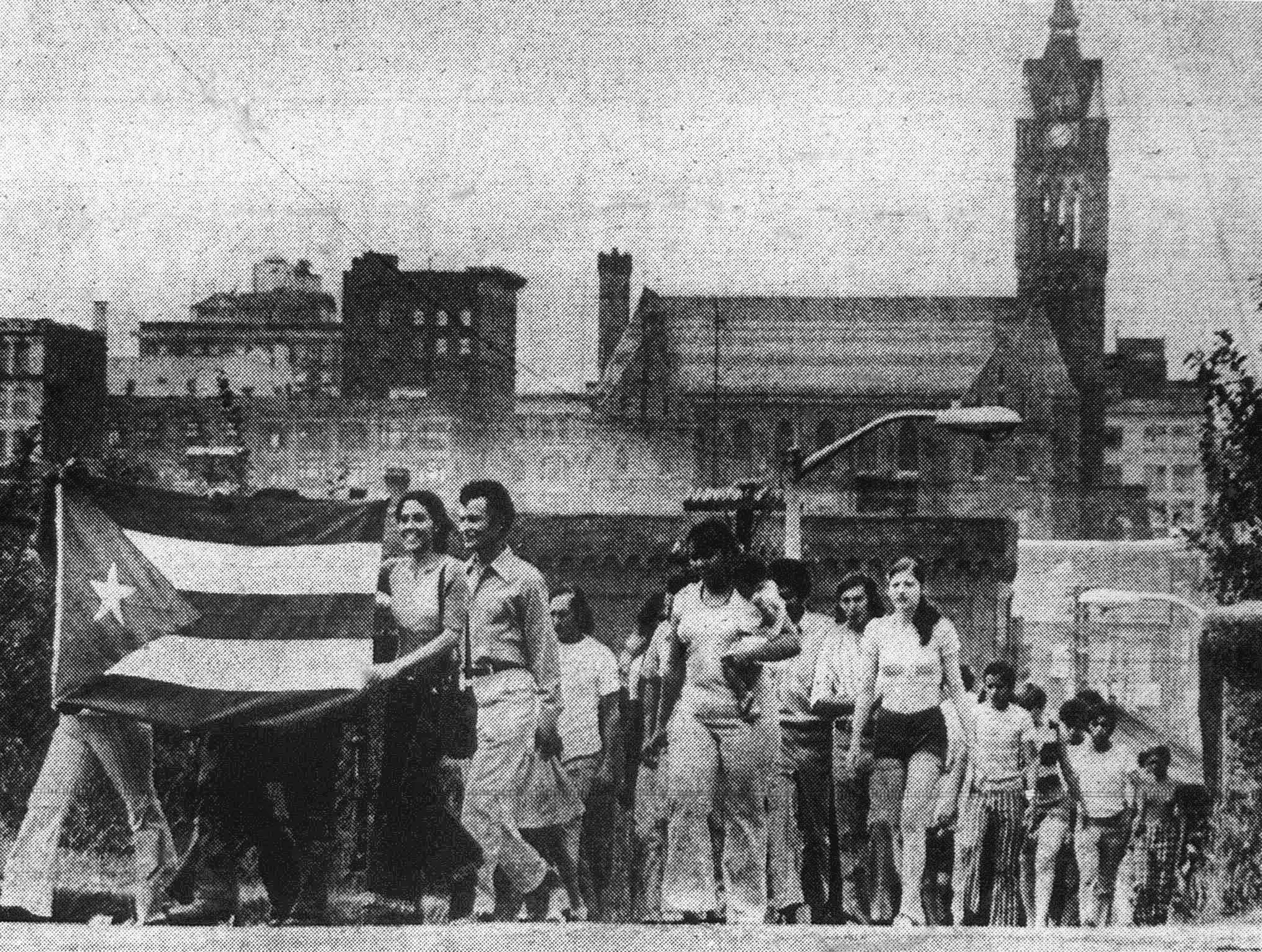
- Members of the Puerto Rican community and other residents of The Flats march peacefully on City Hall on August 1, 1973

Total population
- 44,826 (2010)

Languages
- Puerto Rican Spanish, American English, New York City English

As of the 2010 census, Holyoke, Massachusetts had the largest Puerto Rican population, per capita, of any city in the United States outside Puerto Rico proper, with 47.7% or 44,826 residents being of Puerto Rican heritage, comprising 92.4% of all Latinos in the community. From a combination of farming programs instituted by the US Department of Labor after World War II, and the housing and mills that characterized Holyoke prior to deindustrialization, Puerto Ricans began settling in the city in the mid-1950s, with many arriving during the wave of Puerto Rican migration to the Northeastern United States in the 1980s. A combination of white flight as former generations of mill workers left the city, and a sustained influx of migrants in subsequent generations transformed the demographic from a minority of about 13% of the population in 1980, to the largest single demographic by ancestry in a span of three decades.

In time the city has become a center of Puerto Rican culture on the mainland, with at least one member of the Senate of Puerto Rico being an alumnus of Holyoke Community College, and the city being honored by both the Puerto Rican Cultural Center in the Chicago, and in New York City's National Puerto Rican Day Parade.

== History ==
=== Colonialism and early cultural exchange ===
Following the passage of the Foraker Act, a United States designated colonial government was formed, as the island had been annexed by the Americans following the Spanish–American War. Soon after this government was instituted, several delegations were sent from Puerto Rico to various cities in the United States that were seen as potential trading partners on the mainland. Among the first of these delegations of legislature members and trade representatives, was one which would visit Springfield in 1901. In the following year the newly formed Puerto Rican government would offer to make the first assistant of that city's Mechanic Arts High School, Arthur D. Deane, the supervisor of the island's industrial training. Deane would ultimately decline this offer but accepted one as a temporary agent to the Puerto Rico Department of Education, observing and making a report back to the agency in January 1902 on steps needed to establish Puerto Rico's first industrial arts programs.

In 1901, former Holyoke mayor and congressman William Whiting invited the first civilian colonial governor Charles H. Allen to the city. Allen, an infamous figure in Puerto Rico's history as an American colony, was a former congressman from Lowell and Assistant Secretary of the Navy during the Spanish–American War who was appointed to head the island's new government by President McKinley, whom he had accompanied to Mount Tom two years earlier. During his visit Allen touted the construction of roads which had been completed with no-bid contracts as a resounding success, while also praising the tariff situation around the island's sugar industry as ideal. He would also emphasize the sugar growing capacity of the island and lament that less than half of the island's arable land was in production. During his short tenure as governor and the years that followed, he wasted no time in changing this to suit his own interests. By 1907 Allen would position himself as the robber baron of sugarcane, controlling an estimated 98% of the United States' sugar capacity through his American Sugar Refining Company, which vastly reshaped the economy of the island. By 1930, an estimated 45% of all arable land on Puerto Rico was dedicated to sugar plantations under Allen's control. At the time of his visit to the city a writer for The Republican would close the description of Allen's reception optimistically, comparing Holyoke with San Juan, remarking that the two cities were roughly the same population at that time.

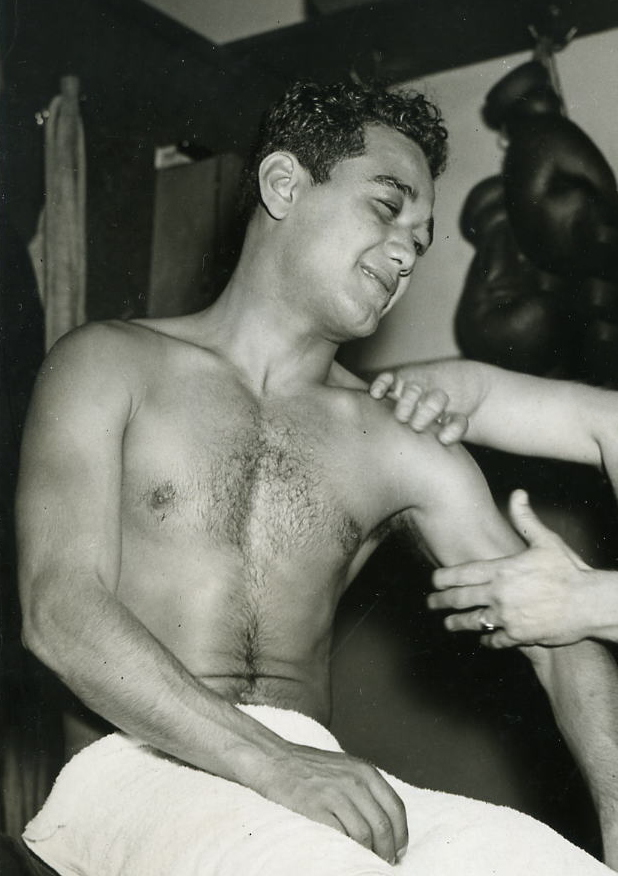
Sixto Escobar, seen here in a 1930 press photo, made his mainland debut at Holyoke's Valley Arena in 1934, and would ultimately become Puerto Rico's first world champion

While the first Puerto Rican immigrants would not arrive in Holyoke en masse until after the Second World War, its own history in Puerto Rican culture begins with Sixto Escobar's mainland debut at the Valley Arena. On May 7, 1934, Escobar defeated bantamweight contender and Canadian flyweight titleholder Bobby Leitham, in a fight that made headlines in local papers and was seen as a dramatic upset in the world of boxing. A few weeks later on May 22, Escobar faced his second opponent on the mainland, Joey Archibald, at the same venue, beating him handily before moving on to a rematch with Leitham in Montreal. These two matches marked an early chapter in a storied career; Escobar would go on to become Puerto Rico's first world champion.

In 1950, the Puerto Rico Industrial Development Company, other offices of the Puerto Rican government, in collaboration with the government of Argentina, assisted in a trial run of the first bagasse (sugar cane waste) based newsprint paper at the mills of the Chemical Paper Company. The demonstration production batch would be manufactured before more than 100 paper, sugar, and chemical magnates and representatives from more than a dozen other countries.

=== Early settlement ===
Historical Puerto Rican Population of Holyoke
Year	Residents	Growth (%)	Percent Total Pop. (%)
1970	≈5,000	–	≈10%
1980	5,764	–	13.5%
1990	12,687	120.1%	29.0%
2000	14,341	13.0%	35.9%
2010	17,826	24.3%	44.7%
2020	19,597	9.9%	51.3%

At the end of World War II, the government of Puerto Rico began the Puerto Rican Farm Labor Program, coordinating with the US Department of Labor to bring seasonal farm workers into the mainland, not unlike the Mexican Bracero program. Between 1947 and 1990 the program would bring in 421,238 Puerto Rican agricultural laborers to the United States. Many of these workers found work in Connecticut and the Pioneer Valley, particularly working for the Shade Tobacco Growers Agricultural Association.

Holyoke's history in Puerto Rican settlements first began around the mid 1950s, when a landlord named Domingo Perez, purportedly became the city's first Puerto Rican resident. By 1956 an article in The Republican reported on 1,000 Puerto Ricans in a self-described immigrant colony in the Greater Springfield area. The first to settle in the area were met with racial discrimination and open hostility, with one Boricua restaurateur describing their people being "treated like animals" at the time. This same family had followed a similar route many others would, having previously moved to the area from New York where they had previously settled in 1948. Another early report of the Puerto Rican community that same year appeared in a Springfield Union article of a wedding held at Holyoke City Hall on January 3, between a Carmen Hermandez and Jesus Mejias, both born in Porto Rico [sic] and residing on Main Street in South Holyoke, who would spend their honeymoon in New York City. At the time Hermandez reportedly worked for the Adams Plastics Co., a South Holyoke-based firm employing 175 workers which future-Mayor Samuel Resnic had cofounded. By this time the company, a maker of "pakkawood" composite handles, was sold to EKCO, however Resnic remained with the firm, and would travel to Puerto Rico himself as Mayor in 1963 while vacationing, representing one of Holyoke's earliest informal exchanges with the island.

By 1958, the Union had begun referring to a Puerto Rican community in The Flats neighborhood of Holyoke, also known as Ward 1. One of the biggest challenges with making inroads with existing communities was the language barrier of the first arrivals, with many only speaking Spanish. Some of the earliest programs working towards integration came from the Greater Springfield Council of Churches, which by 1961 had recruited a number of volunteers, many of whom were retired teachers, to help teach English to Puerto Rican women. Other early cultural exchange programs were held in churches such as Holyoke's St. Paul's Episcopal, which in 1956 hosted a lecture on Puerto Rican culture by a native of the island whose father had served as chancellor of the Episcopal diocese there.

In the 1960s, a large segment of the valley's Puerto Rican population was displaced when Springfield launched a massive urban renewal project in part to expand its highway system, razing many of the low-cost brick tenements between Metro Center and Memorial Square. During this time many would find low-cost housing in the blocks of Holyoke's lower wards, moving to former mill worker areas like South Holyoke and Springdale. Seeing the relative success of relatives and friends, in the 1970s a new wave of immigration began when a large number of families emigrated from New York City and Hartford, moving northward.

=== Mass migration and exclusion ===
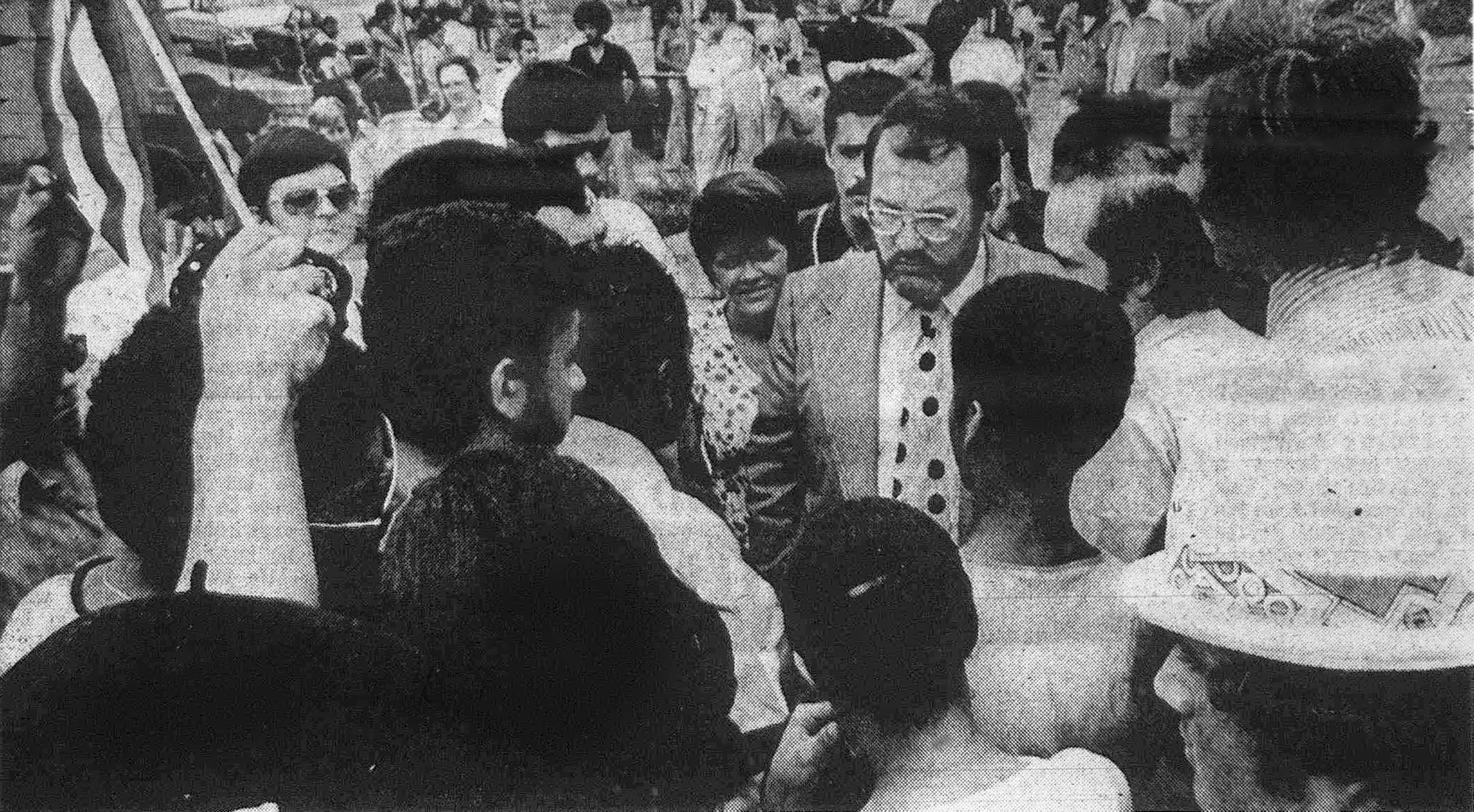
Protesters from Ward 1 confront Mayor William Taupier over police actions and the curfew imposed on them several days prior, providing a list of demands

"I thought I was the only Puerto Rican in town. Then sometime in 1971 I woke up one day and heard a lot of Spanish. By 1972 I became cognizant of what was a change in attitude. Some of the warmth was gone."
—Josephine Carabello, director, Mount Holyoke Office of Compliance
"Let's face it, we're here to stay...The first generation gets the brunt. Then it eases up. That's the way with every ethnic group, the Irish, the Polish and French-Canadians. Our tensions will ease."
—Efrain Figueroa, sales representative for Nabisco
"I don't see any reason why Puerto Ricans...cannot follow the same phases of other migrant groups. But we will always be considered a defined race. If you have a drop of black blood, you are non-white. Race is the most undetermined and difficult to define in terms of sociology. It means different things to different cultures."
—José Efrain Martinez, teacher, Holyoke Public Schools
Quotes from Moriarty, Jo-Ann (July 24, 1983). "Holyoke's Hispanics span economic spectrum". The Republican. Springfield, Mass. p. B-1.

By the time many Puerto Rican families were being uprooted by Springfield's redevelopments, a large upsurge in new arrivals had occurred. In 1967 this new population was mainly low income and very young, with more than half of all Puerto Rican residents being school-aged children, while public agencies remained poorly equipped to provide for the community's needs. Reception to the community from those already in Holyoke and Springfield proved difficult not only due to social discrimination and racism but also as many businesses and government agencies lacked resources for Spanish speakers at a time when substantially fewer in the community spoke English. Far fewer translators were available at that time than today, and growing up in schools that did not speak their mother tongue, many in the younger demographic remained unable to read or write. This was exacerbated by a time when Holyoke saw a level of economic decline it had not witnessed before, or since, with 50% of all industrial jobs disappearing from 1955 to 1975; in this period, Puerto Ricans were witness to a changing colonial economy, leading many laborers to emigrate from the island. While more Puerto Ricans arrived in Holyoke in the 1970s, bringing the population to 5,764 or 13% of the total population by 1980, their numbers were fewer than the subsequent decade, and due to these economic circumstances the city as a whole would see a population decrease of nearly 11%, the most in its history.

The growth of Holyoke's own community, coupled with these aforementioned factors and substandard housing, led to an increasing gap between the Puerto Rican community and a police force that was described by a 1973 Police Foundation report as a group of "117 people, many of whom were related to each other" in the city of 50,000. The report goes on to say that representatives from the Model Cities Program and Governor Sargent's office urged greater outreach and would describe the relationship between the police and Puerto Rican community at that time as "the police [being seen] as brutal men with clubs, [while] the police saw the [Puerto Rican] community as tempestuous people with no respect for law and order".

The growing tension between the two groups reached a breaking point when on July 27, 1973, a 20 year old Boricua man was arrested for stealing a bicycle, struggling with officers before being handcuffed on the hood of a police cruiser. In the short time of this scuffle a crowd of some 400 people had amassed, with some shouting down officers and pelting the police squad with stones, bottles, and bricks. In response the police called in 60 additional backup officers in riot gear from more than a 21 agencies, including a state police unit, bringing between 125 and 200 officers to the area, with numbers differing across news reports. By the end of this disturbance one police officer had been injured and nine individuals were arrested for disturbing the peace. In response to the unrest Mayor William Taupier imposed a curfew during which he directed police himself. From the 27th until the 31st the entirety of ward 1, better known as The Flats was under lockdown from 6pm to 6am with no traffic entering or leaving for reasons other than to reach one's residence or for emergencies, with residents required to present identification to enter or exit the area.

While Taupier would state that no charges of police brutality were found substantive, the police response to the unrest was met with demonstrations and even rebuke by the ward's own Model Cities Program, which had managed the community outreach portion of the city's team policing program. In a report at the organization's policy board meeting, the chairman outlined narratives from both sides of the conflict, concluding that 90% of those reported in the crowd that had formed were spectators, and that the language barrier between police and the community had been one of the key causes of the incident. Following some discussion between a group of residents and representatives of the US Department of Justice, on August 1, 1973, a group of about 100 residents from Ward 1 organized a march through flyers passed around by the Springfield chapter of the Puerto Rican Socialist Party, meeting with the mayor at the end of the demonstration. During the march, community members detailed a formal list of grievances such as alleged harassment of Puerto Ricans by police prior to the incident, as well as such demands as an end to the team police program and for the city's officials to provide greater community involvement in decisions such as the curfew. Following this discussion, an agreement was reached for further discussions with the mayor in the future, and the group marched from their neighborhood to City Hall, where they would demonstrate peacefully.

Ultimately many of the groups demands went unmet by Taupier, including greater consultation with community leadership. The Mayor would deny any allegations of police brutality, saying such complaints could have been officially lodged with the chief of police, and stating that he did not see the group of residents as representative of their community as they themselves were not officeholders. However the considerable political fallout from this incident and the team policing program led Holyoke's aldermen to refuse further funding for the program that same year. Taupier would charge that this was an abuse of power by the council, as according to the city charter he was tasked with directly appointing the police chief and managing the department; nevertheless by 1974 all police had resumed their regular patrols and practices from prior to the program.

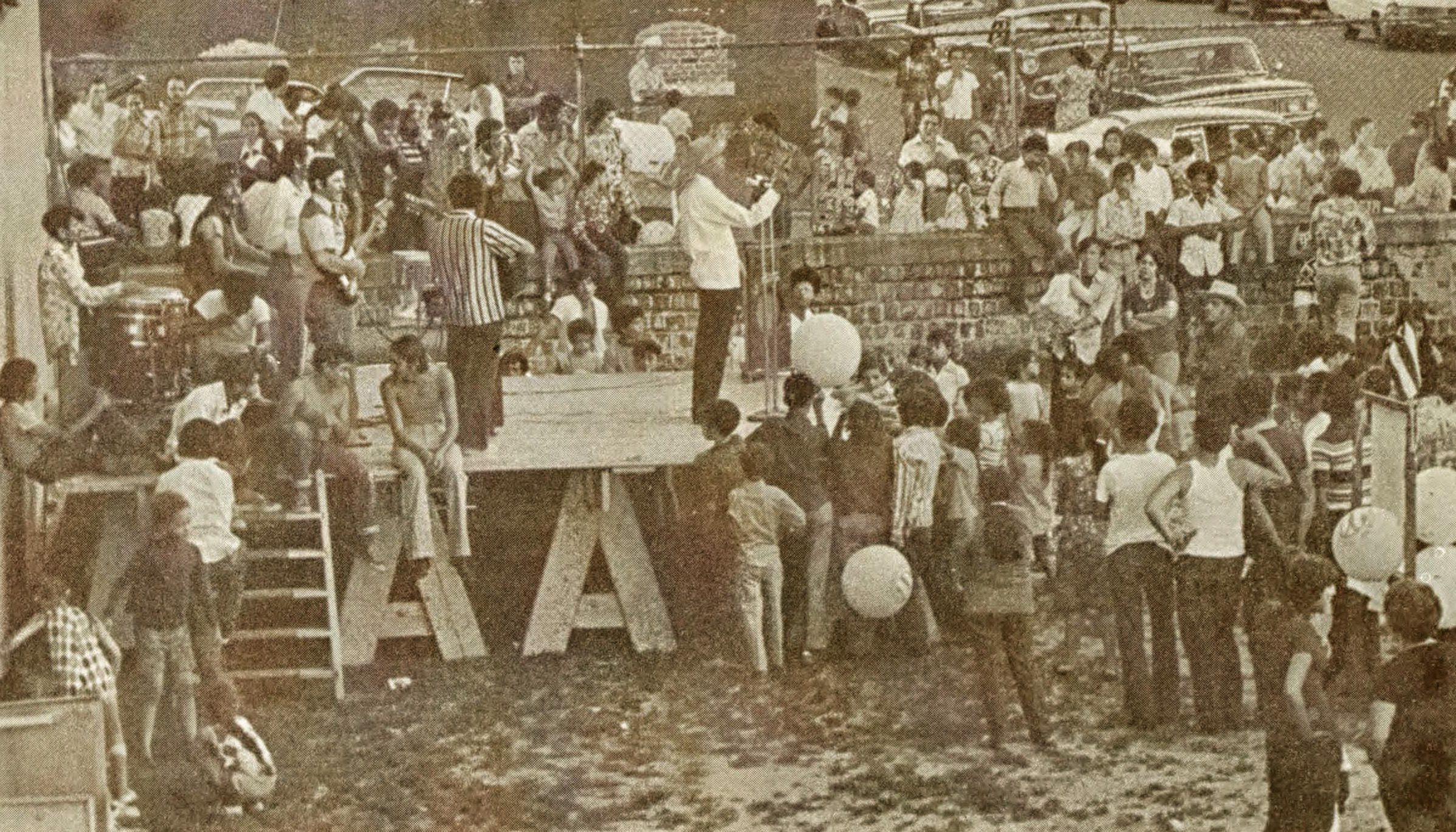
A Puerto Rican street festival during the city's centennial, 1973

Many additional challenges faced the Puerto Rican community at this time, including what the Model Cities director had cited as a lack of leadership and political means of representation in municipal government. In time Puerto Rican culture had seen some acceptance by the cultural institutions of the city, as early as 1975 a Christmas parranda was held at Wistariahurst featuring traditional music and dance. An effort was also made by city hall to establish a referral agency for Latino voters, the block grant-funded Casa Latina was set up in the early 70's but, regarded by community members as ineffective, would be dissolved before the end of the decade.

=== Integration and early representation ===
In many ways the 1980s would redefine the Puerto Rican community socially and politically to this day, as new independent institutions were formed and the first Puerto Ricans would claim positions within city leadership. From 1980 to 1990 the community's population would more than double with nearly 7,000 new residents. It was also around this time in the city's history that Puerto Rican culture would see greater representation in day-to-day life in the city as well, with the first Western Massachusetts Puerto Rican Parade and Festival hosted at Springdale Park in 1984.

School integration became a high priority; following an unsuccessful municipal attempt at redistricting the public schools due to certain closures in 1981, a group of parents formed the Hispanic Parents Advisory Committee which brought suit against the city and the US Department of Education. The latter would rule that the city "was behind in its desegregation efforts and that there were abuses in the isolation of Hispanic students throughout the system." By July a consent decree was reached, with the schools applying for federal grants of $1 million to develop and implement a new integration program, and the police chief at the time reached out to Holyoke Public Schools, vowing full support and to provide any resources necessary to ensure "the success of the integration plan and to insure the safety of all school children." This consent decree however was met with opposition by then-Mayor Ernest Proulx who argued the binding order would put the city in a difficult financial situation if Federal funds went unguaranteed in the future, representing approximately 3% of the city's total budget. Following a multi-month standoff between the mayor's office and the Federal government, and threats of litigation by the latter for contempt, the desegregation plan was signed in US District Court on December 22, 1981, redistricting the city's schools.

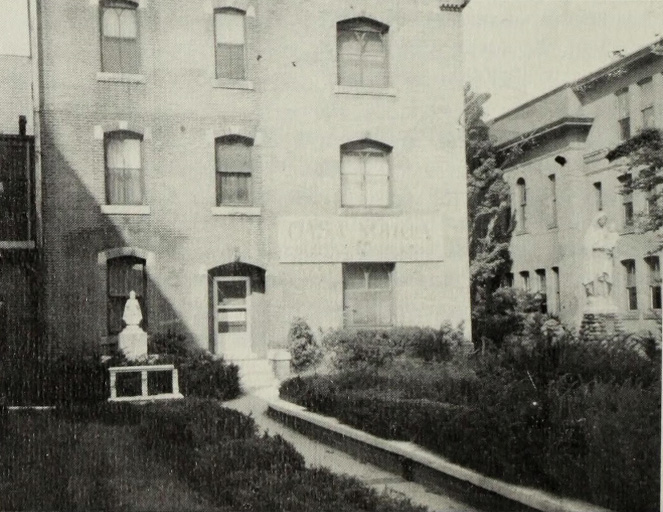
Casa Maria, an early Puerto Rican church in The Flats in the 1970s, run by the Catholic Spanish Apostolate Mission under Father Bonneville; early Spanish Protestant services at that time were found at the Christian Pentecostal Church under the Reverend Wilfredo Hernandy

Among of the concerns frequently cited among both the greater Holyoke Puerto Rican communities and formal surveys from the Valley's nonprofits was a profound lack of representation within the ranks of city government. By 1980 the community represented nearly 15% of the city's population, but total representation from all minority groups in Holyoke city government accounted for less than 4% of all municipal employees. In time a commitment was made by the city with the Department of Housing and Urban Development to raise this number to at least 10% by the end of 1982. However this voluntary compliance in affirmative action did not address the community's needs specifically, nor its lack of leadership.

In May 1982, Carlos Pineiro, a government official of Puerto Rico's Migration Division in Hartford, began publicly urging Mayor Proulx to put a moratorium on all Community Development Block Grants until such time that a Hispanic Affairs Office was established to address the city's poor housing conditions and provide greater youth programs for Hispanic youth. At the time, Proulx would reject this call, citing that current block grants had already received approval for that year, and went on to state that he saw no need for such a commission. By 1984 the political landscape led Proulx to change on this issue, and on February 27, 1984 he appointed a six member Commission on Hispanic Affairs, to act as liaisons for important issues facing the community.

Among new community coalitions was Nueva Esperanza. In the wake of a wave of arson, demolitions used with community development money, selectively enforced building codes, and a high infant mortality rate, a number of organizations including the Valley Opportunity Council, HAPHousing, and Brightwood Development Corporation set aside funds for purchase of one such neglected building and the hiring of a director, one Miguel Arce. Incorporated on July 28, 1982, the community development corporation made its official debut to the city government on April 1, 1983, with plans to purchase and rehabilitate two troubled properties in South Holyoke. By 1987 the organization had renovated and leased seven buildings or 59 units to tenants. Nueva Esperanza's mission, though initially dealing in improving housing conditions for the Puerto Rican community and South Holyoke's poor, gradually incorporated the work of developing neighborhood leadership.

Around this same time, a higher infant mortality rate, and the onset of the AIDS epidemic, both of which had a disparate effect on minorities, including the Puerto Rican population, led to the establishment of the Coalition of Spanish Speaking Providers. This organization, eventually renamed the Holyoke Latino Community Coalition, represented part of the maturation of institutions in the community, bringing health professionals like Sue Tenorio and Orlando Isaza, two of its key figures, to connect the disenfranchised community with a difficult to navigate healthcare establishment.

=== Contemporary history and culture ===
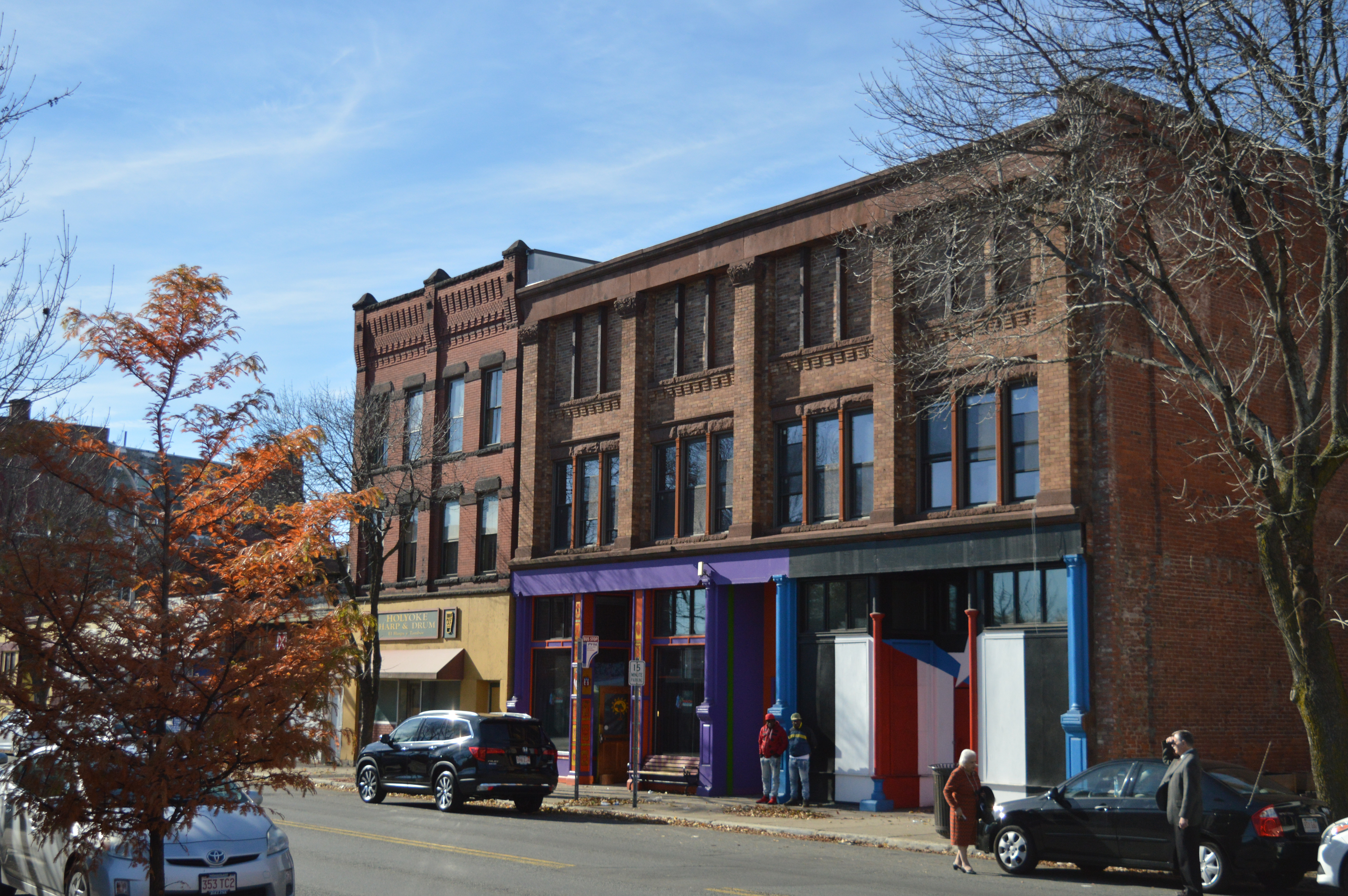
The Puerto Rican-Afro Caribbean Cultural Center, in South Holyoke

While there would not be a prominent Puerto Rican presence in politics until the end of the 20th century, since the 1970s, a number of campaigns were launched by Puerto Ricans and Latino candidates, many of which were, in the words of the candidates themselves "more to assert a Latino political presence than an expectation of winning". Among these was Carlos Vega. An Ecuadorian community activist who managed Nueva Esperanza for many years, Vega would lose to another candidate for a school board seat in 1971. In 1973 Heriberto Flores would see the same outcome, though he would be the very first Puerto Rican to run for Holyoke City Council, then-known as the Board of Aldermen. It was not until 1985 that the first would be elected to city government, with Betty Medina gaining a seat on the school board. Medina, who was active instrumental in organizing the nonprofit Enlace de Familias, serving as its director in subsequent decades would be the first Puerto Rican woman to hold any public office in the Commonwealth. In city politics, Diosdado López, one of Nueva Esperanza's former interns, and key figure in La Familia Hispaña, was the first to be elected to the city council in 1992. By 2018, the representation of Puerto Rican and Latino councilors closely resembled that of the city's demographics, an outcome from gradual integration from the previous margins of municipal politics.

Gradually Puerto Rican culture in schools saw greater acceptance as well; in 1988 the city hall would host more than 100 exhibits talking about the history and art of the island made by students of Holyoke Public Schools. This same year, artist and retired factory worker Angel Sánchez Ortíz moved to Holyoke, and began to work with youths in the city and the Greater Springfield area to provide them with new outlets of creativity and combat a culture of gang activity. Working with local cultural centers Ortíz taught a generation how to make vejigante masks and the traditional dance and festivities which they were associated with on the island. Since that time his own work has been featured in a number of venues, including the Worcester Art Museum, Lowell Folk Festival, and the Augusta Savage Gallery at the University of Massachusetts Amherst.

Following a campaign by Diosdado Lopez, the first member of the community elected to the Board of Aldermen, the city renamed Park Street of South Holyoke to Roberto Clemente Street on August 20, 1993. Clemente, the first Latin American to be inducted into the National Baseball Hall of Fame, was also known for his philanthropy in the Caribbean and Central America, and died in a plane crash on a trip to provide relief supplies to earthquake victims in Nicaragua on New Year's Eve 1972. In attendance for the dedication ceremony was the right fielder's widow, Vera Clemente (née Zabala), who thanked city residents for honoring her late husband, and presided over the unveiling with the department of public works.

In recent years the Holyoke community has seen greater national coverage, including a feature in NPR's Code Switch, and in 2016 hosted a summit of New England Puerto Rican leaders sponsored by Hunter College's Centro de Estudios Puertorriqueños. On June 23, 2017, the city's Mayor Alex Morse, and city councilors Gladys Lebron-Martinez, Nelson Roman, and Jossie Valentin, would honor national Puerto Rican figure Oscar López Rivera, controversial militant and former leader of the clandestine paramilitary independence group Fuerzas Armadas de Liberación Nacional Puertorriqueña. A month earlier López Rivera had been released from prison from a commuted sentence by President Barack Obama, and while he had never been formally charged in the FALN bombings on offices of the US Defense Department, López Rivera, had faced other felony charges including seditious conspiracy. In response to his marching in the Puerto Rican Day Parade in New York, a boycott campaign had been launched against the event by the Media Research Center, and several Democratic officials like Senator Chuck Schumer and Governor Andrew Cuomo had pulled out of appearances at the event; in contrast, the board of that event had unanimously declared Rivera a "hero of the nation." When confronted about this terrorist label by reporters during his ceremony in Holyoke, López Rivera responded "all my actions have been actions of love — love for my people, love for the future of my people, love for humanity...so I don’t have any problems with people and their labels."

The city would receive national coverage as Puerto Rico residents on the island became displaced in the aftermath of Hurricane Maria, many turned to relatives in the city, and during the 2017-2018 school year, Holyoke Public Schools saw 235 new students enroll whose families were displaced. In some cases children were sent to live with relatives temporarily while the island rebuilt. In 2018, San Juan mayor Carmen Yulín Cruz spoke in Holyoke, describing the gradual recovery of the island as well as its severe lack of resources. Cruz was presented the key to the city on April 28, 2018 by Mayor Alex Morse to honor that "in such a time of despair [she] provided a beacon of hope and opportunity for Puerto Ricans."

In 2021 the city elected its first mayor of Puerto Rican descent, Joshua A. Garcia, who had previously served as the chair of Nueva Esperanza.

== Enclaves ==
A map of Holyoke, Springfield, and Pioneer Valley block groups by percent Spanish speaking households in 2016 where English is not a household language; the greatest proportion of the population found in Holyoke and the North End of Springfield Legend 0.325–0.542 0.25–0.325 0.175–0.25 0.10–0.175 0.05–0.10 0.018–0.05 0

While there is a Puerto Rican demographic throughout all of Holyoke today, as of 2018 the neighborhoods of South Holyoke, The Flats, and Churchill were among those areas with the largest Puerto Rican populations proportionally, all having more than 75% residents of Puerto Rican heritage, with 83.5% of all South Holyoke's residents being of Puerto Rican heritage. Despite efforts to create more equitable housing from a variety of nonprofit groups, as of 2018, South Holyoke had the highest percentage of renter-occupied housing in any neighborhood outside of Boston, with an average of 1.5% owner-occupied households across the neighborhood's two census block groups.

According to the Census's 2012-2016 American Community Survey, Spanish is spoken among a large segment of the population but, as a language spoken at home, comprised a fraction of households. The highest proportion of Spanish or Spanish Creole speaking households was about 54.2% in a block group in one section of Churchill. In South Holyoke about 45% of households speak Spanish at home, while no block group in The Flats neighborhood exceeded 25%.

As of 2018, ongoing efforts have been put forward to formally create a cultural district along the Main Street areas of South Holyoke and the Flats, in what would be a first for the city. Today many events are held by the community, including by its cultural centers at Nueva Esperanza and Nuestras Raices, with work going towards bringing an official state designation to support programs that encourage cultural exchange, tourism, and commerce. Not unlike in the Greater New York area, Holyoke and its surrounding cities of Springfield and Chicopee, are home to a number of self-identified bodegas, small independent convenience stores often having delis or produce. In one 2008 survey it was found South Holyoke alone was home to at least 18 such stores.

== Events ==
Among the city's annual events are the Western Massachusetts Puerto Rican Parade and Festival, a three-day festival, held every summer in Springdale Park since 1984. Additionally El Sabor de South Holyoke ("Taste of South Holyoke Festival"), which features local Puerto Rican cuisine, has been held annually in the fall since 2016.

== Institutions ==
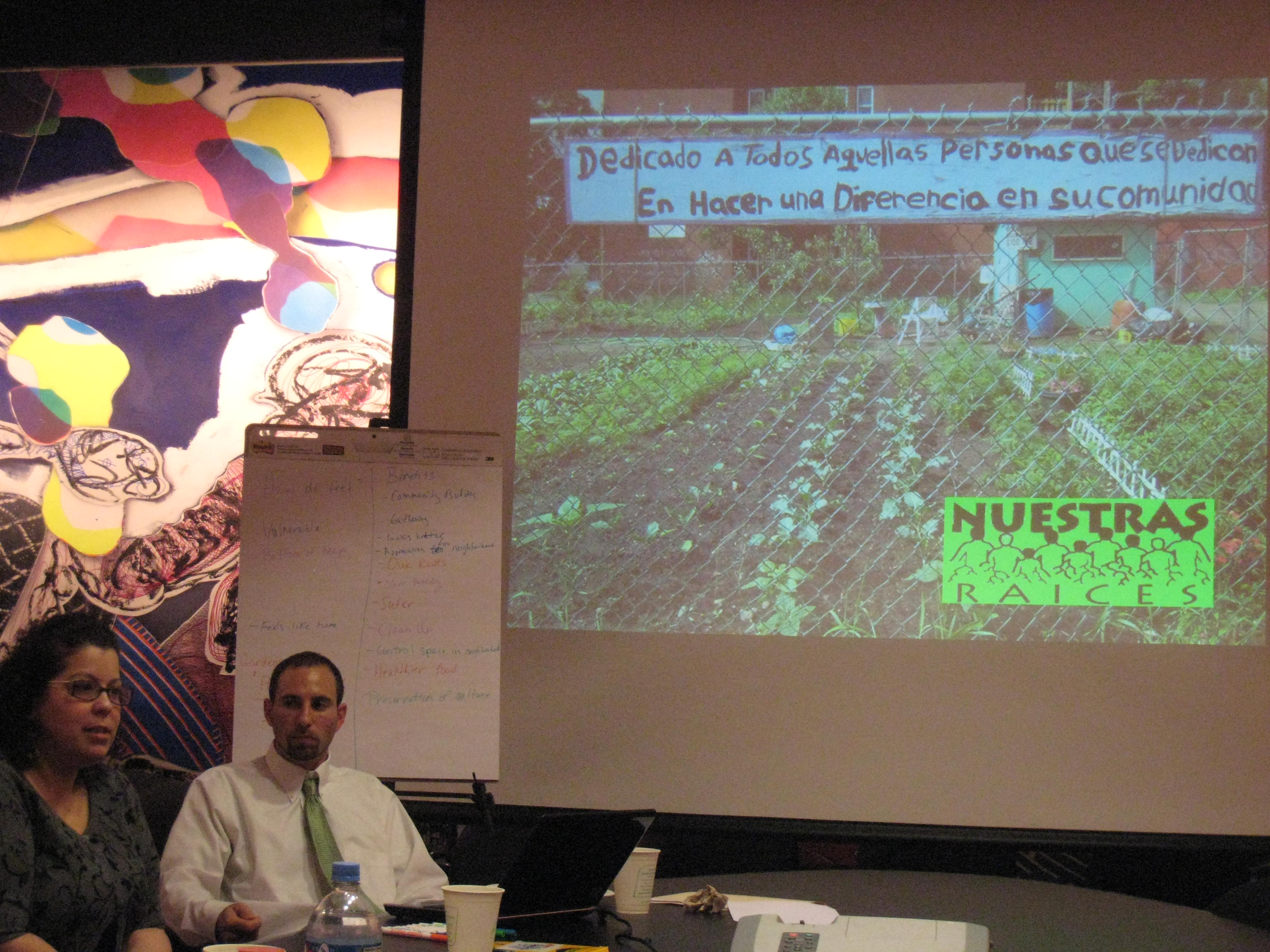
A presentation given by Nuestras Raices at MIT discussing urban agricultural programs, and community based food systems

From this legacy of more than fifty years of Puerto Rican culture in Holyoke, a number of institutions serving the Puerto Rican and broader Latino community have maintained a presence in the city including, but not limited to, the Massachusetts Latino Chamber of Commerce, the New England Farm Workers’ Council, Nuestras Raices, Nueva Esperanza which now managed the Puerto Rican Afro Caribbean Cultural Center (formerly known as El Mercado), and the Puerto Rican Cultural Project. The city is also home to a number of domino clubs, as the game holds particular popularity in island and mainland culture.

Over the years Wistariahurst, which provides historic and cultural exhibits and resources for Holyoke's many ethnic communities, has amassed a substantial collection on Holyoke's Puerto Rican history. The museum, working in tandem with the Holyoke Public Library, has also been in the process of collecting and curating firsthand accounts of this history through the "Nuestros Senderos" program, with the help of a grant from the National Endowment for the Humanities. In 2019, a portion of a large private book collection of Puerto Rican history and literature was donated to the Holyoke Public Library and its affiliate the Puerto Rican Cultural Project (PRCP) by Celia Vice Acosta, daughter of Celia Acosta Vice (1919–1993). Acosta Vice, a longtime community activist in New York City, was the first female grand marshall of the National Puerto Rican Day Parade, as well as the first Latina Puerto Rican real estate broker in Brooklyn, where she founded the first bookstore in the City devoted to the island's culture, the Puerto Rican Heritage Bookstore. The collection is planned to serve as a foundation for a broader Puerto Rican cultural archive in the Holyoke Public Library.

In 2018 the Massachusetts chapter of the Borinqueneers Motorcycle Club, so-named in honor of the 65th Infantry Regiment, was established in Holyoke, making the state the 6th to have its own chapter. The motorcycle club, whose membership comprises members of the unit, veterans, and their descendants, holds community events and raises awareness about veterans issues, taking part in national veterans rides like Rolling Thunder.

=== Media ===
Title card for Vecinos/Neighbors, c. 1991–1995

As a growing demographic, the Puerto Rican community began to see greater representation in media. In the 1970s, the Holyoke Transcript-Telegram's publisher, William Dwight Jr., attempted to cover some local news in Spanish. Though it had only been a decade since Holyoke's last major non-English publication, the French La Justice, had folded, the effort to introduce a non-English paper was not well-received at that time. The city's Latino population was a much smaller demographic then, and not enough additional papers were sold to warrant the change, while the decision was met with paranoia by many non-Hispanic whites who, Dwight would later speculate, "thought we were going to sneak stories over on them." In 1991, citing a lack of news coverage and negative portrayals, local resident Maria Figueroa reached out to Rev. Gus Peterson, a member of the board of Nueva Esperanza and owner of The Reminder in South Hadley; together they published La Nueva Era (The New Era) in March 1991, a biweekly Spanish-language newspaper extant for some duration of the early 1990s. Not long after the Transcript folded in 1994, the Holyoke Sun would make a similar attempt with a single page dedicated to news in Spanish; however, this was received as too little by the Puerto Rican community and again faced the same backlash from non-Spanish speakers. Since that time, the paper has continued to cover the events and issues of the community; however, at the beginning of the 21st century, new outlets would publish material that catered to Spanish speakers in the Valley. In 2000, local journalist Anita Rivera worked with The Republican to launch El Pueblo Latino (The Latin People), a Spanish weekly which covers news in the Greater Holyoke area. Other independent media outlets would appear as well, including El Sol Latino, a bilingual monthly which was launched by former UMass professor Manuel Frau Ramos in 2004, as well as La Prensa (The Press) in 2007, a monthly bilingual news outlet which covered Latino culture in the Greater Springfield area until 2013.

In 1991, activist Carlos Vega and Holyoke Public School teachers Sylvia Galván and Gary O'Connor launched Vecinos/Neighbors, a weekly bilingual public-access television program talking about life in Holyoke's Puerto Rican community during that time, featuring performances by local artists and interviews with prominent community figures. Among those interviewed were nationally known Latino figures, including writer Sandra Cisneros and labor activist Cesar Chavez. The program ceased following a reorganization of local cable public-access in 1996. In July 2018, Diosdado Lopez and La Familia Hispana, Inc. donated a collection of tapes containing Vecinos/Neighbors programs and other related local media to the Puerto Rican Cultural Project at the Holyoke Public Library. In June 2019, the Council on Library and Information Resources announced it had given a grant of $14,644 for the digitization of these more than 100 recordings for online publication as part of its "Recordings at Risk" program.
