= Wistariahurst =

Historic house in Massachusetts, United States

Wistariahurst Museum
- Former name: Holyoke Museum of Fine Arts and Natural History
- Established: 1901 (original museum); 1959 (current site)
- Location: Holyoke, Massachusetts
- Coordinates: 42°12′17″N 72°37′4″W
- Type: Historic house museum
- Director: Megan Seiler
- Owner: City of Holyoke
- Public transit access: Bus: PVTA B23, R24 (all)
- Website: wistariahurst.org
- Wistariahurst
- U.S. National Register of Historic Places
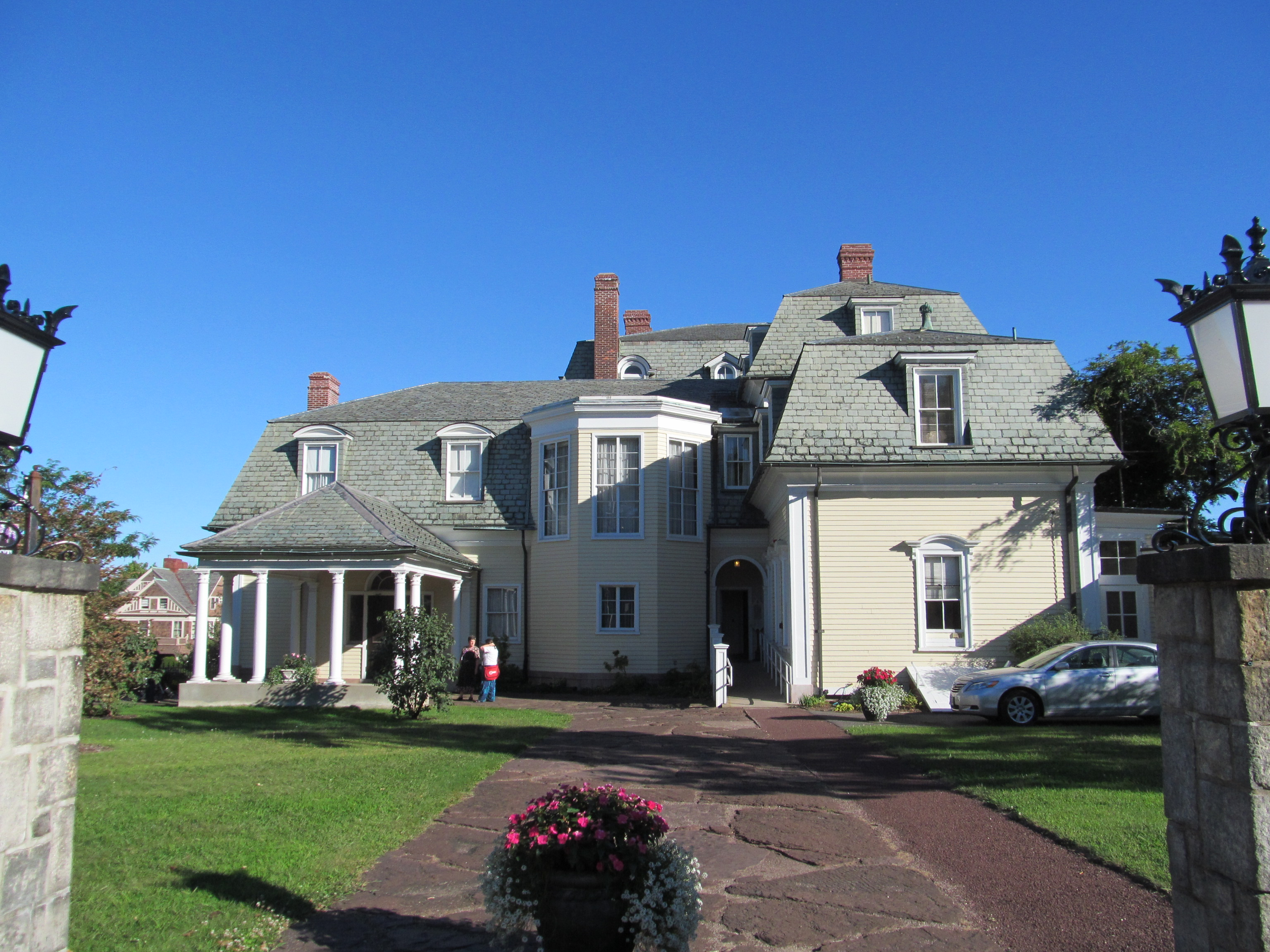
- Wistariahurst

- Location within Holyoke Location within Massachusetts Location within the United States
- Location: 238 Cabot St., Holyoke, Massachusetts
- Area: 2.5 acres (1.0 ha)
- Built: 1868; 1874 (Note: Moved and rebuilt in Holyoke)
- Architect: William Fenno Pratt; Clarence Sumner Luce; Wilson Eyre (Note: In 1868 William Fenno Pratt designed the original 3-story structure which comprises the main portion of the home to the east, as well as the carriage house at a later date after the building had been moved to Holyoke. Deconstruction, moving, and 1874 reconstruction plans were devised by Clarence S. Luce who also initially designed the music room expansion. Wilson Eyre would design the house's current main entryway in 1927.)
- Architectural style: Second Empire
- NRHP reference No.: 73000295
- Added to NRHP: April 23, 1973

Wistariahurst is a historic house museum and the former estate of the Skinner family, located at 238 Cabot Street in Holyoke, Massachusetts. It was built in 1868 for William Skinner, the owner of a successful silk spinning and textile business, and is named for the abundant wisteria vines which cascade across its eastern facade. Originally constructed in Williamsburg in 1868, the mansion designed by Northampton architect William Ferro Pratt was moved to Holyoke in 1874, following the devastating flood which swept away the original Skinner mills. Following the death of Belle Skinner, its music room was operated as a private museum from 1930 to 1959, housing the Belle Skinner Collection of Old Musical Instruments, before their donation by the family to Yale University. Since 1959 it has been operated as the Wistariahurst Museum, and is open to the public. The property was listed on the National Register of Historic Places in 1973.

== Architecture and history ==
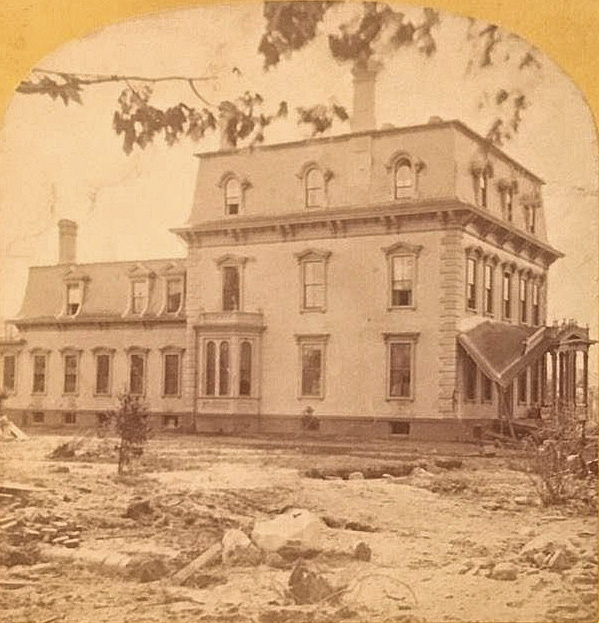
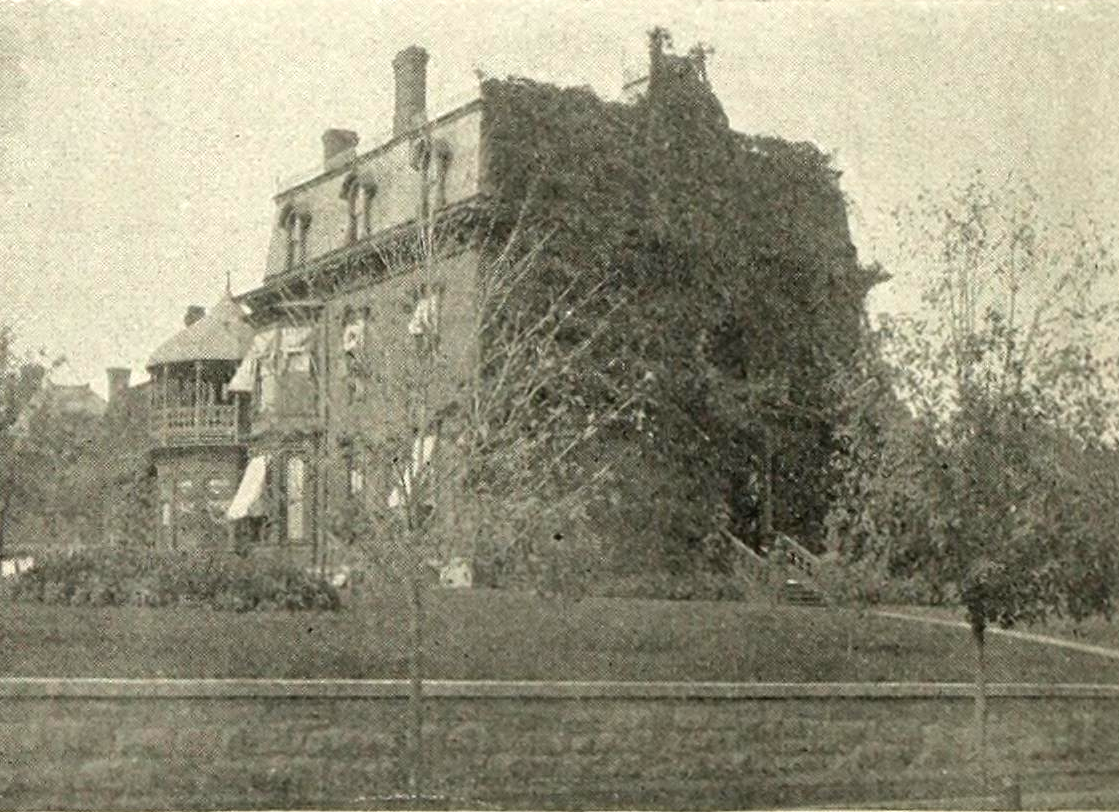
Top to bottom: Wistariahurst in Williamsburg after the Mill River Flood of 1874, and as it appeared in its current location in Holyoke in 1891

Wistariahurst occupies an entire city block in central Holyoke, bounded by Cabot, Beech, Pine, and Hampshire Streets. The lot is ringed by a low stone retaining wall, which is topped by iron fencing, with entrances on the Beech Street side providing vehicular access to the carriage house and main drive. The main walkway entrance is on Cabot Street, flanked by marble lions. The main house is a three-story wood-frame structure, to which a number of additions and alterations have been made over the years. The main, and oldest, portion of the structure is basically square and topped by a mansard roof. The wisteria vines were planted around the same time as the estate was moved, and though the house was previously the subject of news articles for its hanging wisteria gardens, the name "Wistariahurst" first appeared in the Springfield Republican in 1904, in a notice for the wedding of Katharine Skinner and Stewart Kilborne. A two-story hall projects from one side, added in 1927, and a single-story addition housing a music room and conservatory were added in 1913. The interior is lavishly decorated with original period finishes including tooled leather wall finishings in one room, and original wallpaper in another. The mansion comprises 26 rooms, as well as 16 fireplaces.

The oldest part of the mansion was built while Skinner lived in the nearby town of Williamsburg, and was moved to Holyoke in 1874 when he relocated his business there after a devastating flood. Additions were made to the premises in 1913 and 1927. The buildings and grounds were owned continually by the Skinner family until 1959, when Katharine Skinner Kilborne, the youngest child of William and Sarah Skinner, and her heirs gave Wistariahurst to the City of Holyoke for cultural and educational purposes. Initially considered for demolition by the city for a parking lot for the adjacent high school building at the time, it became the home of the Holyoke Museum of Fine Arts and Natural History, and subsequently a cultural and historic house museum after 1976 when the Library Corporation withdrew its collections.

=== Carriage house ===
Designed by Northampton architect William Ferro Pratt around the same time as the house was removed to Holyoke, the carriage house was constructed circa 1880, and eventually expanded in 1913 to accommodate automobiles. Following the donation of the estate the building was home to the Holyoke Youth Museum which featured a Native American exhibit and the taxidermy collection by Burlingham Schurr, a former curator of Amherst College's zoology collections and curator of the museums prior to its relocation to Wistariahurst when it was known as the Holyoke Museum of Natural History and Art. The building originally was crowned with a large cupola and spire, however by the end of the 1960s this was removed, several windows were filled, and by 1980 the entrance was altered to its present appearance today.

Following a period of disuse and deferred maintenance, it was decided around 2005 that the carriage house would be restored to house the archives of Wistariahurst's various collections in a climate-controlled environment. Although a new cupola would remain absent, following $1 million in refurbishments provided by the United Bank Foundation, Massachusetts Cultural Council, and the city, the building was restored largely within its original architectural style and reopened as the archival research center in October 2009.

== Museum ==
=== History ===
==== Predecessor and founding ====
Prior to the donation of the Wistariahurst estate, the museum was originally the Holyoke Museum of Natural History, and later the Holyoke Museum of Fine Arts and Natural History. Its origins were rooted in the meeting of an earlier counterpart, the Holyoke Scientific Club, which first began holding meetings as early as 1886 in William Whiting's Windsor Hotel and the homes of its 30 or so members, discussing such topics as water engines, the Cowles Syndicate's process for metal reduction, and developments in the Holyoke Water Power Company among others. The early association largely took interest in subjects related to industrial technologies and early on in its existence the group consulted with one of the directors of the Water Power Company on the idea of opening a school of technology. In 1887 its name was changed to the Holyoke Scientific Association, and on February 17, 1888, it was granted a formal charter.

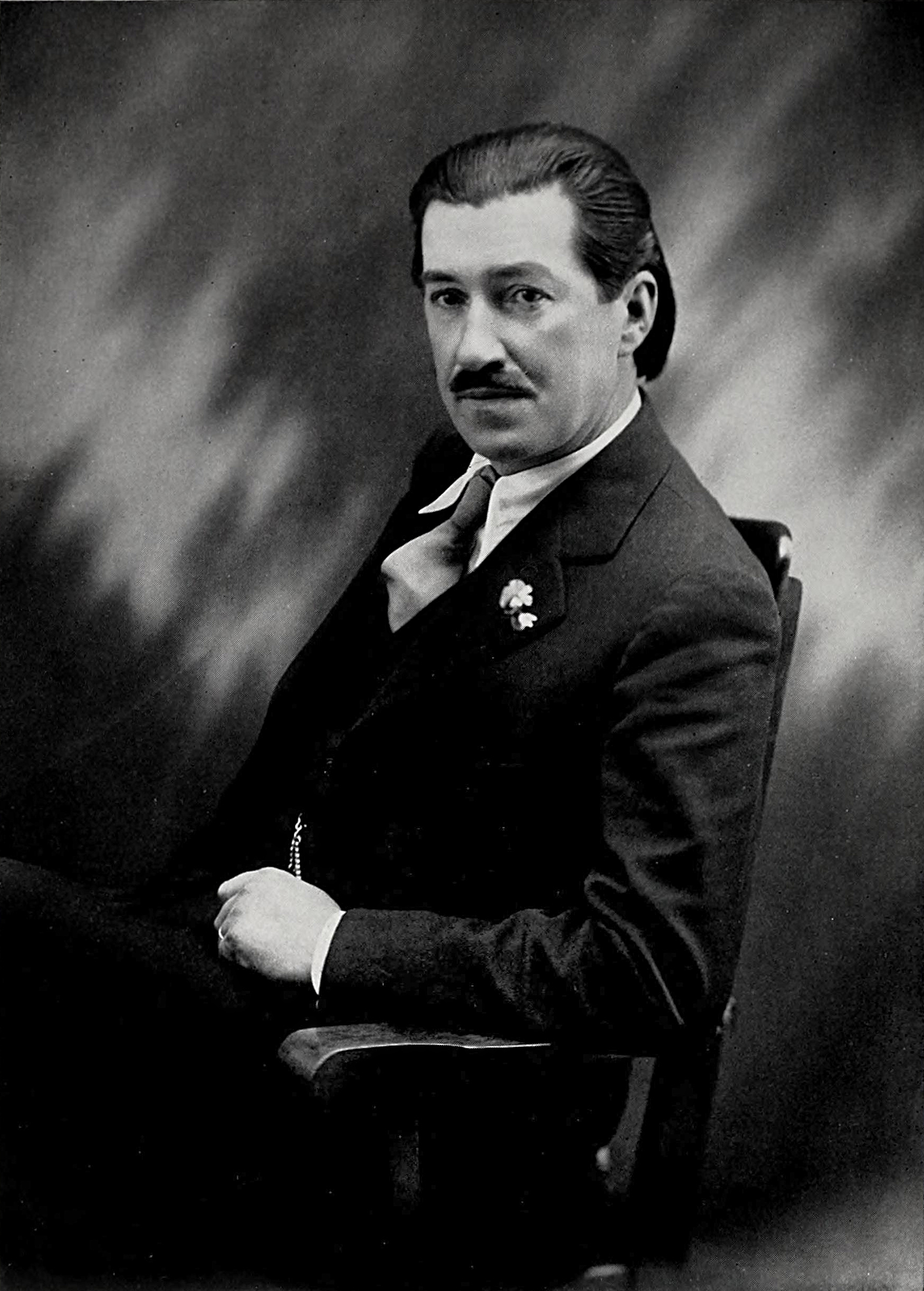
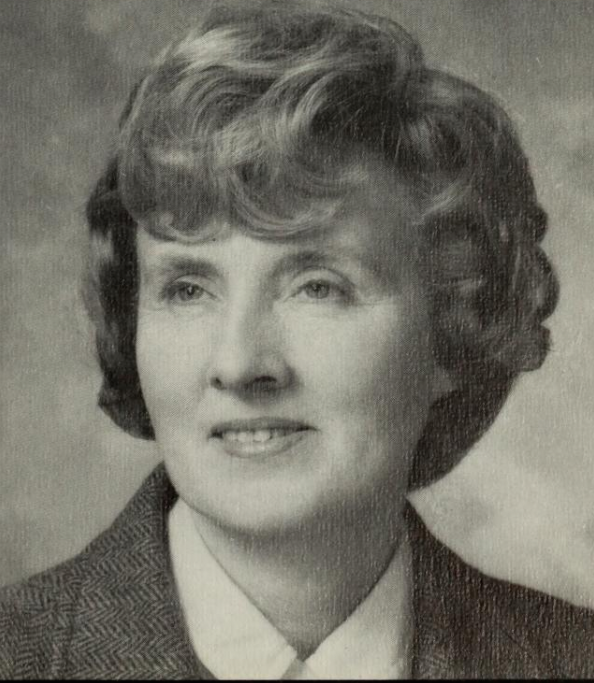
Burlingham Schurr (top), the Holyoke Museum's director during its time in Holyoke Public Library, from 1926 until his death in 1951; his daughter Marie Schurr Quirk (bottom), museum director at Wistariahurst, 1959-1975, during the Library Corp. era, again from 1976-1984 after the City reopened Wistariahurst

The initial mission of the Association was "to awaken and maintain an active interest in the Practical Sciences, and to aid generally in connection with Arts, Agricultural, Manufacturers and Commerce", and its bylaws would introduce the museum, which was to be curated by the city's librarian. When the library opened in 1902, the museum found its first home in the east wing on the second floor, and by that time had acquired the "Sherman Indian Collection" of indigenous stone implements from one of its members, William J Howes. Initially such collections could only be viewed by appointment in the organization's earliest years. In 1926 the museum, then known as the Holyoke Museum of Natural History, hired Burlingham Schurr, who had previously curated the Berkshire Museum and the Worcester Museum of Natural History, as the directing curator. Schurr, a naturalist and taxidermist, would assemble a comprehensive collection of specimens from the Pioneer Valley's flora, fauna, minerals, and fossils, and served in this post until his death in 1951.

In 1928 the museum purchased 29 paintings, beginning its art collection, of which William Skinner II was a contributor. And by 1952 the Aldermen passed an order for Mayor William Toepfert to name a committee to provide the museum with a permanent home with regular hours. That same year the museum received a donation of 20,000 beetle, moth, and butterfly specimens with the donation of the Charles M. Barr Memorial Case of Insects, and in 1953 it received Charles Coe Collection of Mexican and South American Items. During the 1950s lecture tours on wildlife and art were held in order to raise funds for a permanent home, along with the sale of Christmas cards for fundraising. Early contributors of funds included Quota Club, Holyoke Women's Club, Holyoke Lions Club, as well as local troops of Boy Scouts and Girl Scouts, and several memorial donations. The former Kenilworth Castle was reportedly one of the sites considered for the museum but was deemed too prohibitively expensive to fit its needs. Finally in June 1959 the Skinner-Kilborne family's Wistariahurst estate was donated to the city for cultural purposes, and subsequently designated as the permanent home of the museum, where in the course of the next several decades it would retool its exhibits gradually around the Skinner's silk industry history and cultural subjects. By the beginning of the 21st century the natural history collections would almost entirely be donated to the University of Massachusetts.

==== Music Room era ====
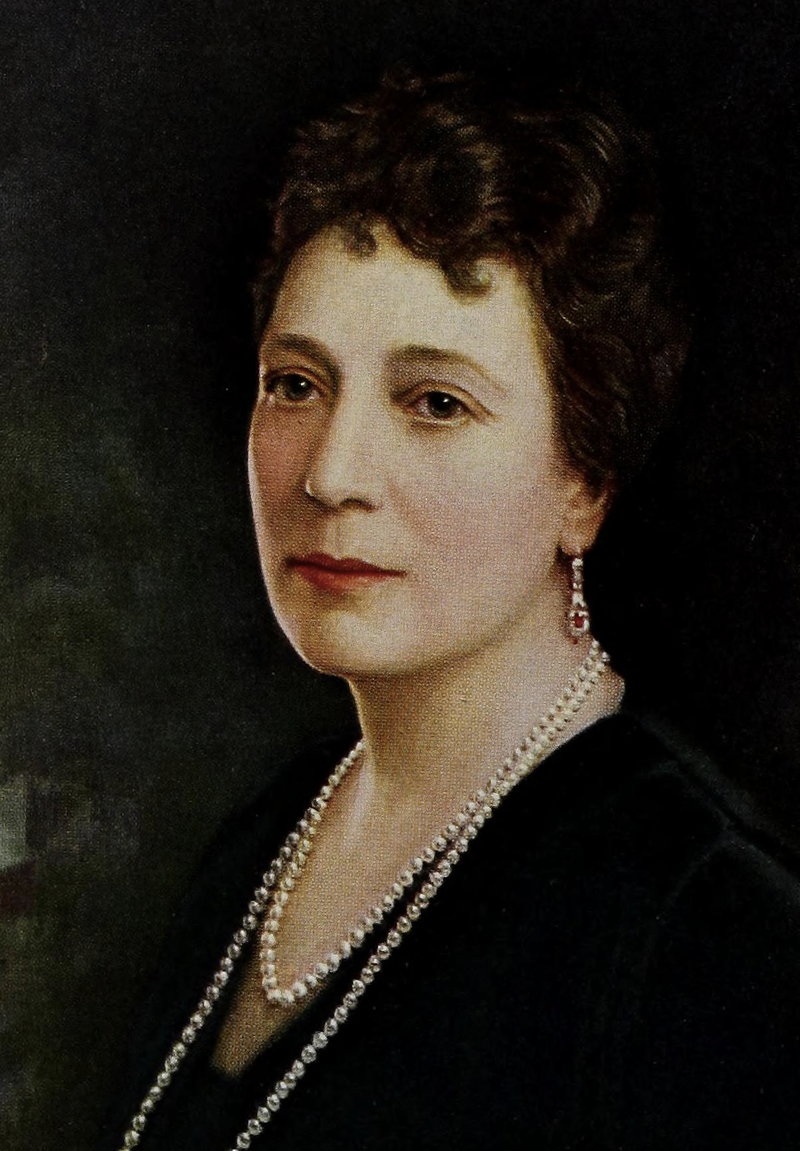
Detail of portrait of Belle Skinner by Irving Wiles

With Belle Skinner's untimely death in 1928, her brothers, Joseph and William, would work to preserve and share the treasures of her estate, including her world-renowned rare instrument collection. While the house remained owned and occupied by the Skinner family for three more decades, according to the United States Office of Education, in 1930 the Music Room housing the Belle Skinner Collection of Old Instruments was established as a museum open to the public. Its hours were described in 1937 through at least 1946 as being limited to 2:30 to 5pm on Fridays, or otherwise by appointment, with tickets sold at the Skinner Silk Mill offices of 208 Appleton Street, and admission limited to 6 to 8 people at a time. From 1930 to 1933, it was maintained by Nils J. Ericsson, a pupil of Arnold Dolmetsch who worked at Boston's Chickering & Sons before becoming curator in 1923, assisted Dolmetsch with his restoration of many of Belle Skinner's instruments, and compiled much of the notes that went into the collection's official 1933 catalog. Though fond of Miss Skinner, Dolmetsch himself was a critic of the collection during its cataloguing in that time, claiming some pieces such as the clavicytherium purported to belong to Pope Gregory XIII were obvious forgeries, though being careful to note others were indeed authentic, writing to William Skinner II that he believed the most valuable possession of the collection was the 1610 hammerklavier (Skinner #85/Yale 4988.1960), an early example of piano preceding Bartolomeo Cristofori's by nearing a century. Ultimately Dolmetsch's name would barely grace the pages of the catalog, and in the midst of cataloging the instruments of the collection, Ericsson died suddenly on February 17, 1933, as a result of an operation at Springfield Hospital. Following his death, his work was assumed by one of his protégées, Fanny Reed Hammond, a musician, musical arranger, and wife of the noted organist William Churchill Hammond.

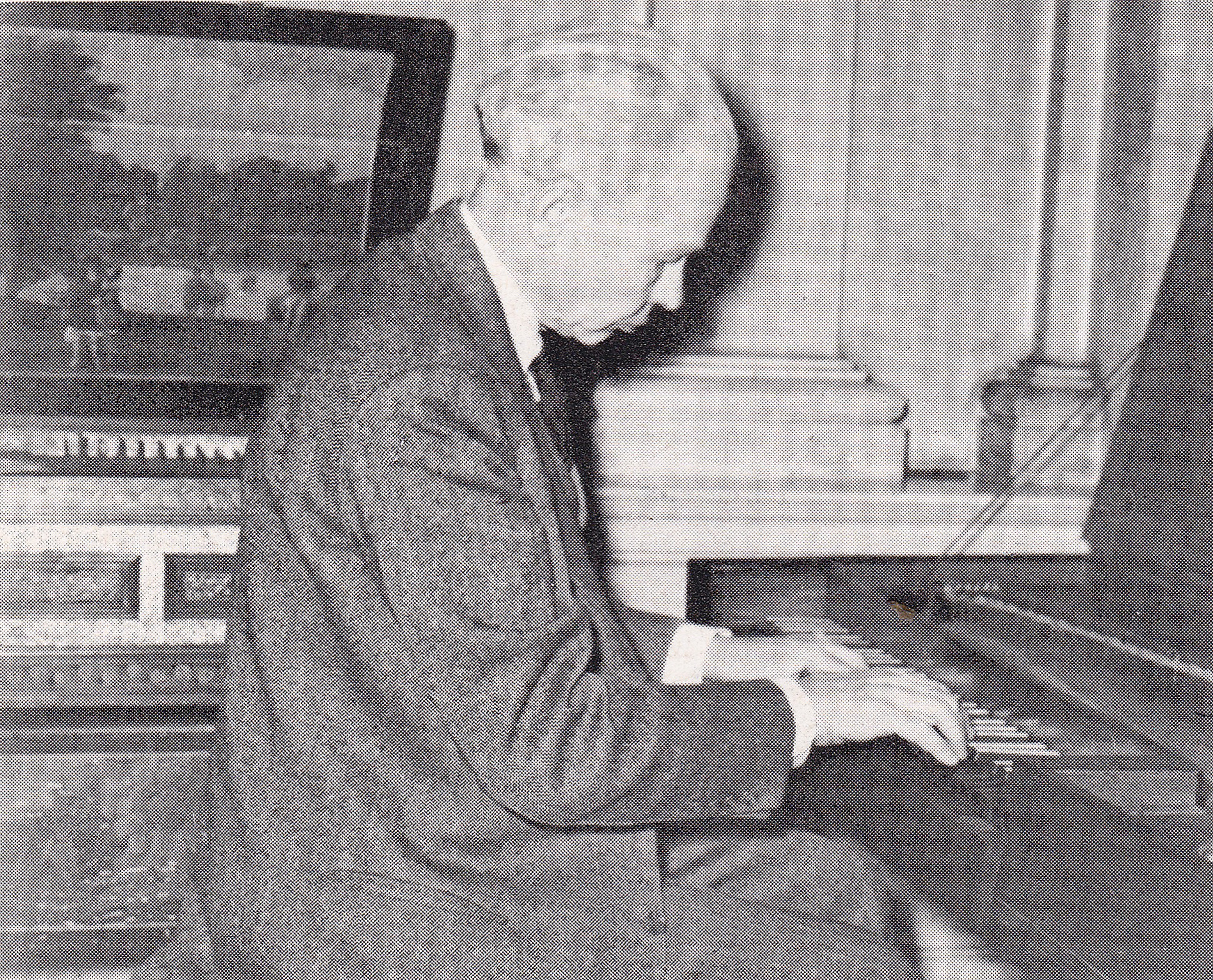
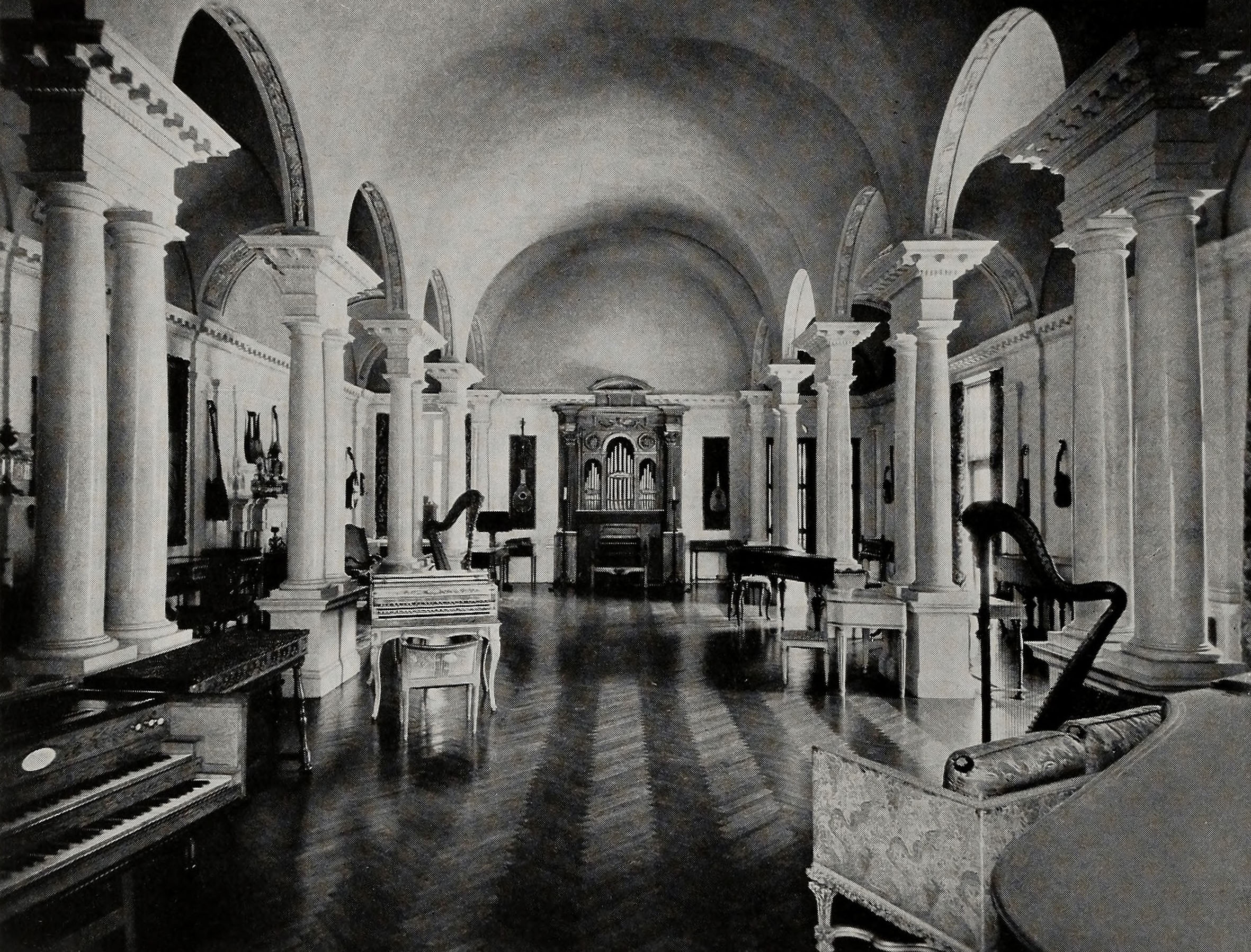
Left to right: Bruce Simonds, Professor of Music and former Dean of the Yale School of Music, plays the clavichord in 1955, during the first public recording of the Belle Skinner Collection; the Wistariahurst Music Room in 1933, with several of the collection's instruments shown

She would remain curator of the collection until its move to Yale University in July 1959.

For the three decades that the music room was open, Wistariahurst would host many social clubs, colleges, and musicians, including Serge Koussevitzky, director and conductor of the Boston Symphony Orchestra, who described it as "a collection of superlatives". Hammond would also give the occasional recital on the instruments to various groups, such as the Sunderland Woman's Club. Among other notable pieces in this collection was a spinet built by Pascal Taskin for Marie Antoinette, a virginal made for Nell Gwyn, one of the only surviving examples of keyboards from Carolean England, and a Yuan dynasty era guqin bearing the signature of noted Chinese poet and musician Zhao Mengfu.

In the mid-1950s, one of the Skinner heirs, Elizabeth Kilborne Hudnut, made strides to render the collection's treasures more accessible to the public. In 1955 she would invite a group of musicians from Vox Records to make the first public recordings of the collection, including Bruce T. Simonds, a former dean of the Yale School of music. The resulting album was a two disc collection called Spotlight on Keyboard, featuring the instruments as well as other collections, as part of a broader series illustrating the evolution of musical instruments across the centuries. Though the effort to capture the qualities of these historic instruments was praised by music critics, the release was also panned by some, including one reviewer in Gramophone who lamented “unfortunately the recording techniques used are so poor that the net result is an often unacceptable sound”. Though this would be the only Wistariahurst album on a record label, in 1958 and early 1959, Elizabeth would commission private pressings of two more albums, narrated by Mrs. Hammond, which offered a history of the collection as well as explanations of the stories of each recorded instrument. By this time however, despite Elizabeth's efforts, the two other heirs of the collection, Robert Stewart Kilborne, and William Skinner Kilborne, no longer had interest in maintaining it. In May 1959, after several months of discussing the donation of the Wistariahurst estate to the City of Holyoke, the heirs were approached by Sibyl Marcuse, who had recently become director of Yale's fledgling instrument collection, a 1900 donation by New England Steinway dealer Morris Steinert. Struggling to find a permanent home for a collection deemed unimportant by administrators, she sought to add to the collection to a degree that it would be so impressive as to warrant its own space. Ultimately it was agreed that the two nephews, Yale alumni, would donate their stake in the collection to the university, while the remaining stake, that of Elizabeth, was purchased for $47,000 (approximately $416,000 in 2020 USD), with funds raised by the Friends of Music at Yale. The Wistariahurst estate was donated to the City in-full the following month, and by the end of July 1959, the last of the rare instruments had been moved to Yale's campus in New Haven, becoming in-effect, the first major acquisition of the Yale Collection of Musical Instruments, establishing it as a world-renowned repository of musical instruments. With the sale of the Skinner Mills two years later in 1961, the Skinner family marked the end of a century of working and living in Holyoke.

==== Library corporation era ====
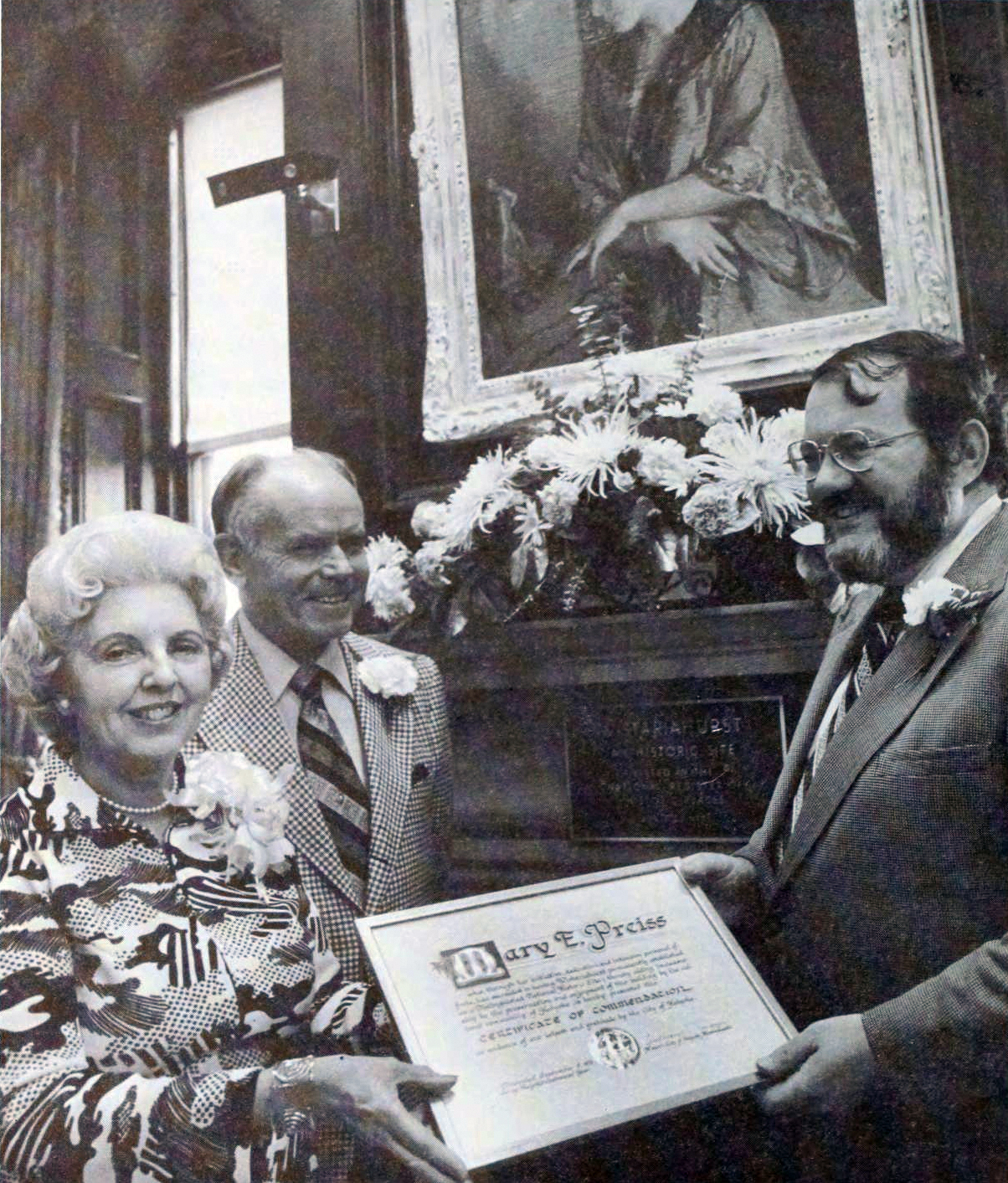
Mayor William Taupier presenting Mary E. Preiss a certificate of commendation for her work in getting Wistariahurst on the National Register of Historic Places, 1973

When the entirety of Wistariahurst was first opened to the public in 1959 as a museum, it was operated by the Holyoke Public Library Corporation which, despite its name, is a private organization. As early as 1939 the corporation had sought to use the space for its collections, as well as incorporating those of Belle Skinner. The group and its director, Mary Preiss, would successfully get the Wistariahurst estate on the National Register of Historic Places in 1973, and during this period its collections of natural history specimens, art, and artifacts were prominently featured in the halls of the house, as well as a number of notable exhibitions, including an example of Claude Monet's Houses of Parliament, loaned from the Metropolitan Museum of Art in 1968. This period of the museum's history would come to an end however in June 1975. Shortly before his resignation, Mayor William Taupier demanded the private Library Corporation relinquish control of the Wistariahurst estate to the city's Historical Commission, in return for public funding. Agreeing to the terms, the Library would also remove its collections as well, leading the city to file suit against the corporation to determine what parts of this collection were private property and which belonged to the city.

Unfortunately, in the years following a 1989 multimillion-dollar budget shortfall, the Library Corporation would sell more than 80 paintings in 1991 and 1992 to private collectors, some originally gifts of their artists. This collection, once housed in Wistariahurst in the mid-20th century held British, Irish, and American Impressionist paintings, including examples by Holyoke local William Chadwick, William Merritt Chase, Frederic Edwin Church, F. O. C. Darley, Francis Day, Frank Duveneck, John Joseph Enneking, Edward Gay, Mauritz de Haas, Howard Russell Butler, Joseph Goodhue Chandler, Eastman Johnson, Régis François Gignoux, Charles P. Gruppé, Hugh Bolton Jones, Alfred Jacob Miller, Edward Moran, John George Brown, N. C. Wyeth, Maitland Armstrong, Ivan Olinsky, Thomas Gainsborough, Arthur Fitzwilliam Tait, John Henry Twachtman. With the absence of the Library Corporation's collections, for a brief time after the estate reopened in the late 1970s, it would house a volleyball exhibit, a rough predecessor of the Volleyball Hall of Fame. The museum briefly faced the prospect of closure when in 1982 the city council passed a tentative budget calling for the complete removal of its budget, prompting a preservation campaign by concerned citizens. Fortunately this budget was later invalidated by the state revenue office, as the full membership of the council had not been present during said votes.

=== Visiting today ===
Wistariahurst Museum today provides a view into the lives and tastes of the two generations of the Skinner family that lived in it. The museum features original leather wall coverings, columns, elaborate woodwork and an interesting tale of how two generations perceived and used the house very differently. The museum's permanent collection includes decorative arts; paintings and prints, textiles, and a rich manuscript collection of family and local papers. The museum offers a variety of programs and events, including workshops, concerts, lectures, and demonstrations. The museum is also available for private rental and group tours, and its grounds are rented out to weddings and other social functions.

The museum hosts annual events like its Annual Plant Sale, which raises money toward maintaining the estate's gardens, as well as events for students like "Immigration Experience". The day-long workshop brings in elementary school students from surrounding communities to learn about the lives of immigrants across different ethnicities and classes as they entered the United States via Ellis Island, including millworkers, as well as the Skinner family themselves, as William Skinner himself had immigrated from England.

Through the University of Massachusetts Amherst and support from the National Endowment for the Humanities, the museum has in recent years previously offered a 1 credit graduate history workshop for school teachers, covering women's history in the city, and the use of primary sources to develop classroom curricula. Working with the Holyoke Public Library, the museum has also been instrumental in archiving histories of minority communities, including the National Endowment for the Humanities-funded, Nuestros Senderos, collecting stories, photographs, and primary sources for Holyoke Puerto Rican history, as well as supporting Black Holyoke, a project by Erika Slocumb, and funded by Mass Humanities, archiving accounts of Holyoke's Black community history.

=== Archive collections ===
In addition to seasonal exhibits, gallery shows, and programming with partner institutions, the museum also maintains numerous items found in its permanent collections. Beginning with content donated by the Skinner family, in the decades since the museum's founding it has received multiple donations of material related to the culture and industry of the city.

Ref #	Name	Years	Description
MS 101	Skinner Family Collection	1864-1980	211 boxes; primarily of material dating between 1860 and 1960 concerning Skinner Family and their silk business
MS 201	Holyoke Collection	1794–Present	200 boxes; multifaceted collection containing items related to culture, industry, government, clubs, education, transportation and media
2011.1.2	Carlos Vega Collection of Latino History in Holyoke	1948-1980	43 boxes; organizational records of Nueva Esperanza, social, political, and cultural Latino experience in Holyoke
L2011.028	Holyoke City Hall Collection	1859-1976	104 volumes; ledger records, including mortgage records, tax liens, and legal notices
2012.019	Magoon Collection of Papermaking History	1870-2008	8 boxes + equipment; donated by David Magoon, founder of University Products, contains Am. Writing, Parsons, Chemical, Newton, and Whiting Paper ephemera
2016.010	Holyoke Canoe Club Collection	1888-1993	15 boxes; by-laws, financials, postcards, and ephemera relating to the Holyoke Canoe Club in Smith's Ferry
TEXTILES.001	Textile Collection	1830-1970	157 boxes; clothing, linens, accessories. Includes Skinner family clothing and others either made by Skinner or worn by residents.
	Holyoke Postcard Collection	1876-1990	3 boxes; Approximately 1,900 postcards featuring landmarks and natural landscapes
	Natural History Collection	1927-1951	Burlingham Schurr's taxidermy primarily donated to UMass Amherst Natural History Collection, "Frog Circus" still kept
	William Cobbett Skinner Journals	1876, 1888	Donated by Elizabeth Kilborne Hudnut in 1989, contains journal entries for William Skinner's first-born son at ages, 19 & 31

== Gallery ==
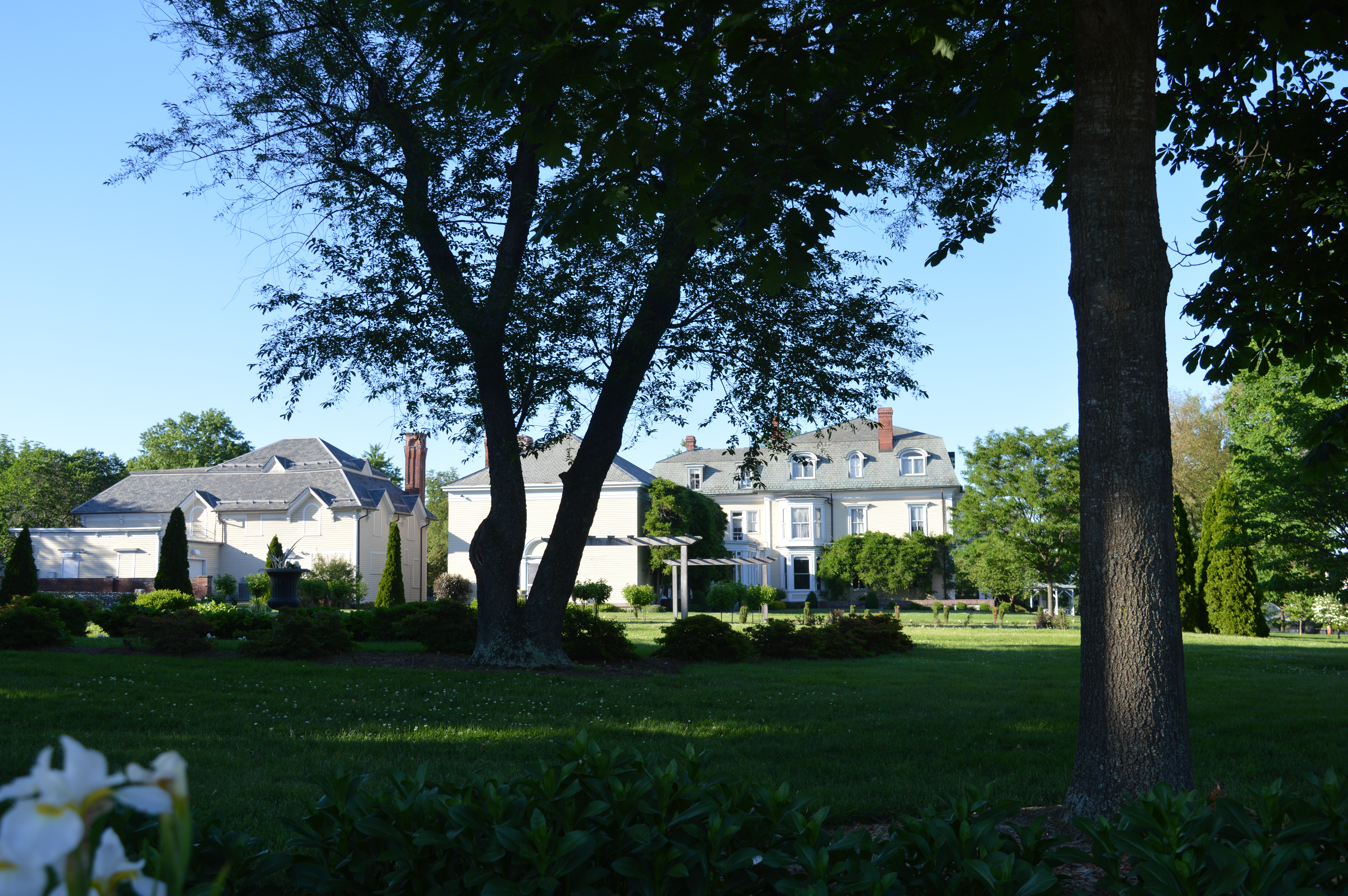
The estate and gardens of Wistariahurst, with the carriage house visible at the left

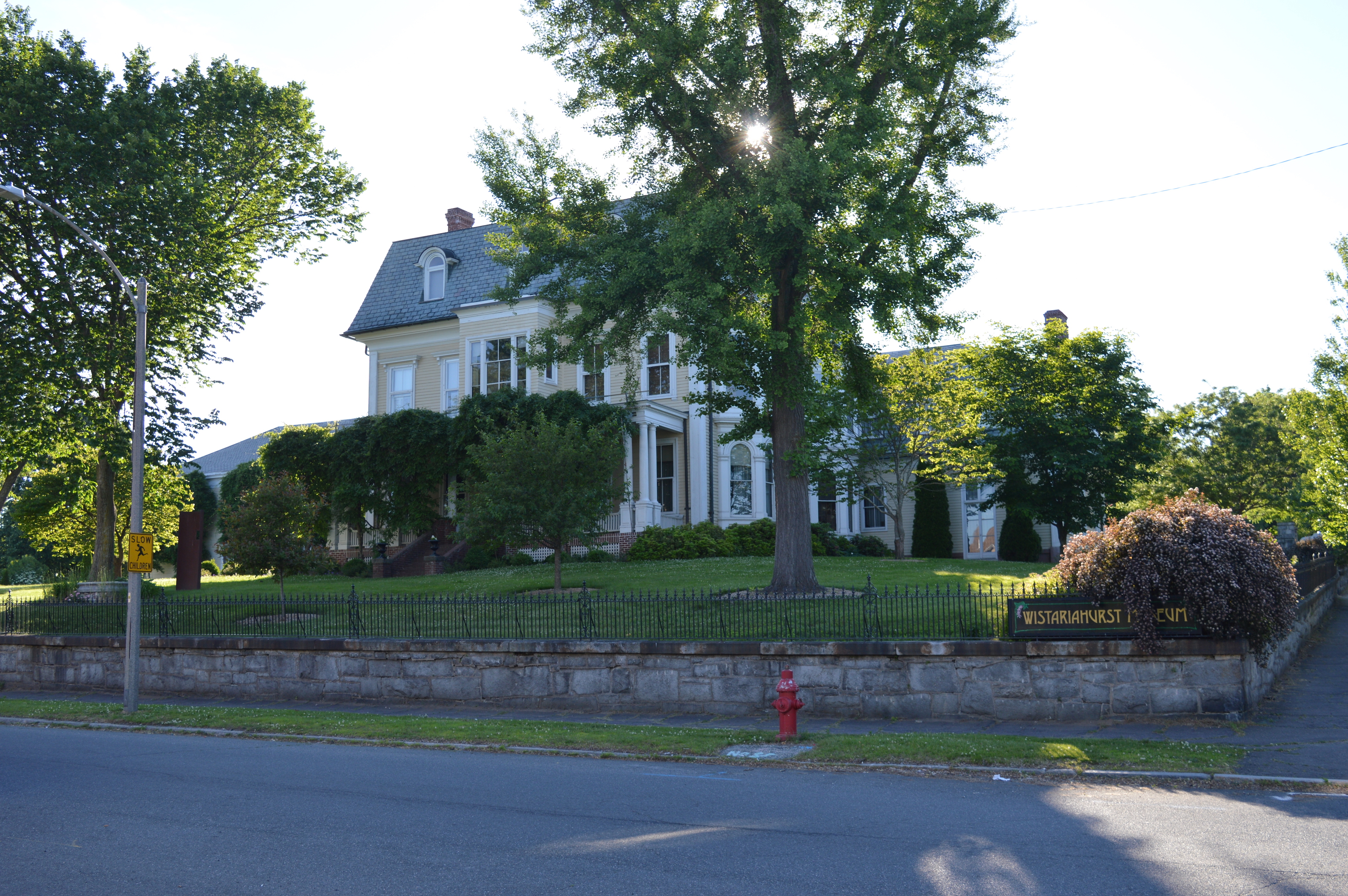
The easterly facade of the house, with its eponymous wisteria hanging gardens

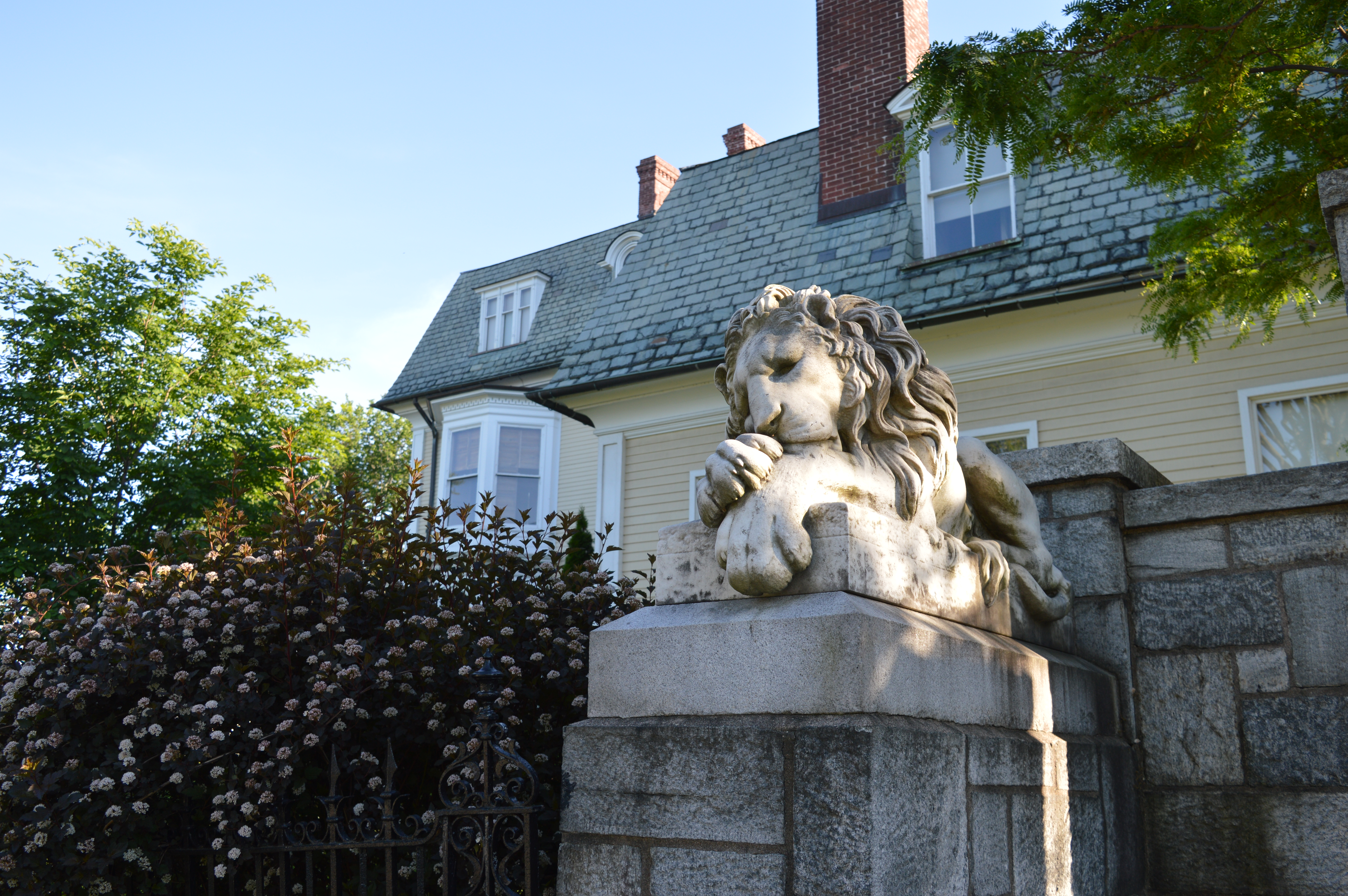
The Sleeping Lion, one of two marble lions by Cabot Street, purchased in Rome by Sarah Skinner, they are based on the lions of the Tomb of Pope Clement XIII.

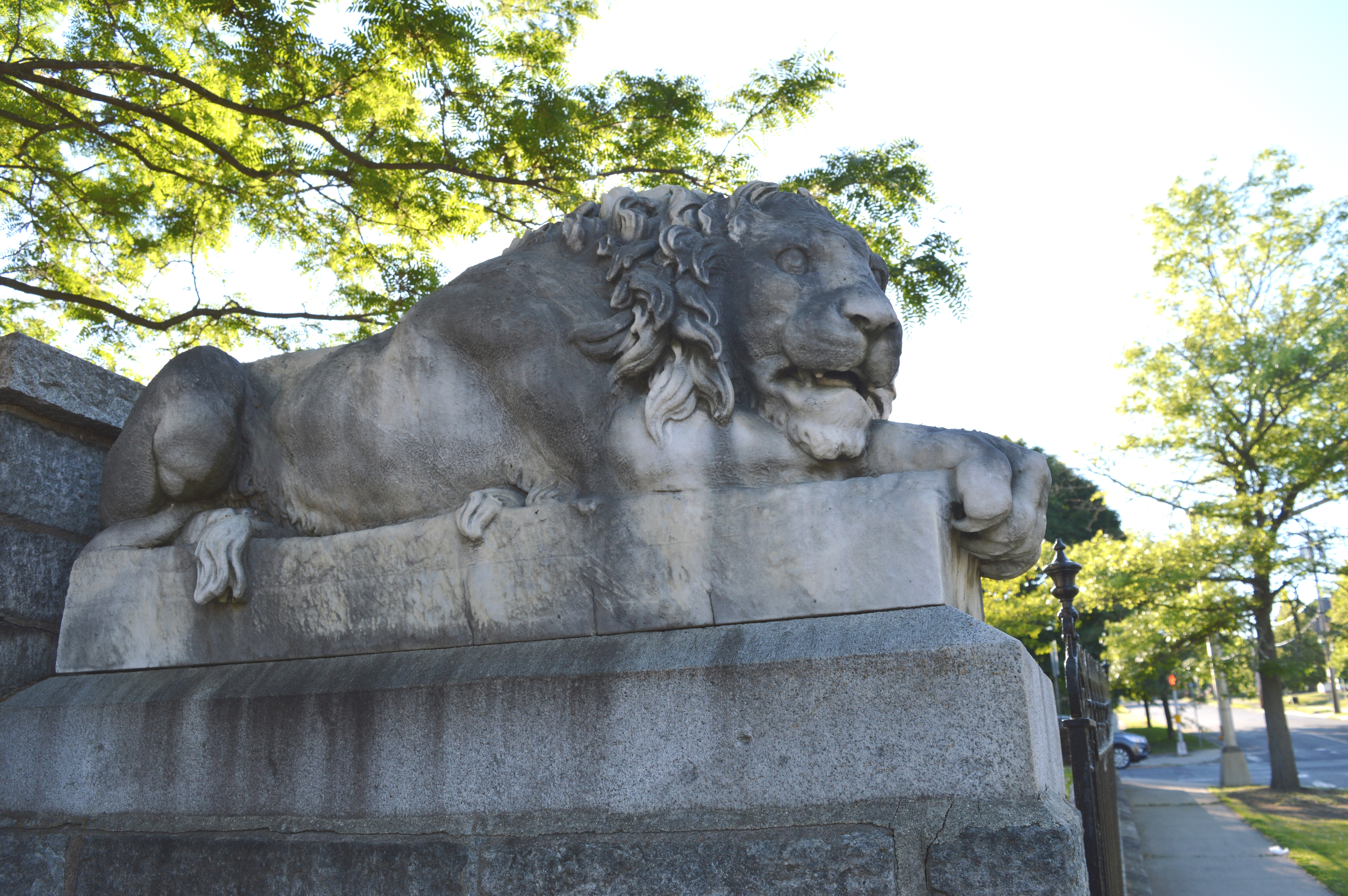
The Alert Lion

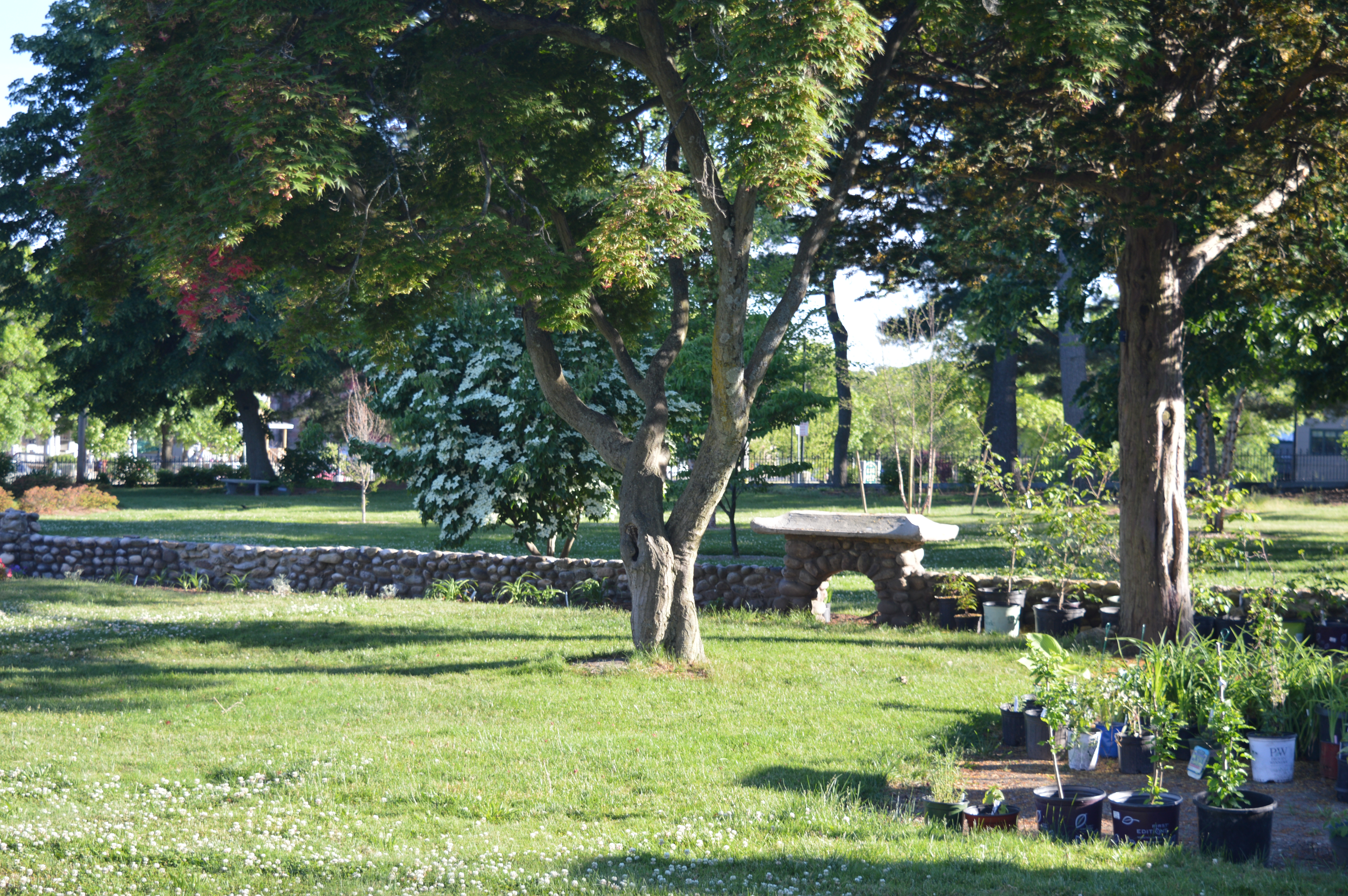
Remnants of the Tea Garden, a garden which previously contained a Japanese pavilion in the early 20th century

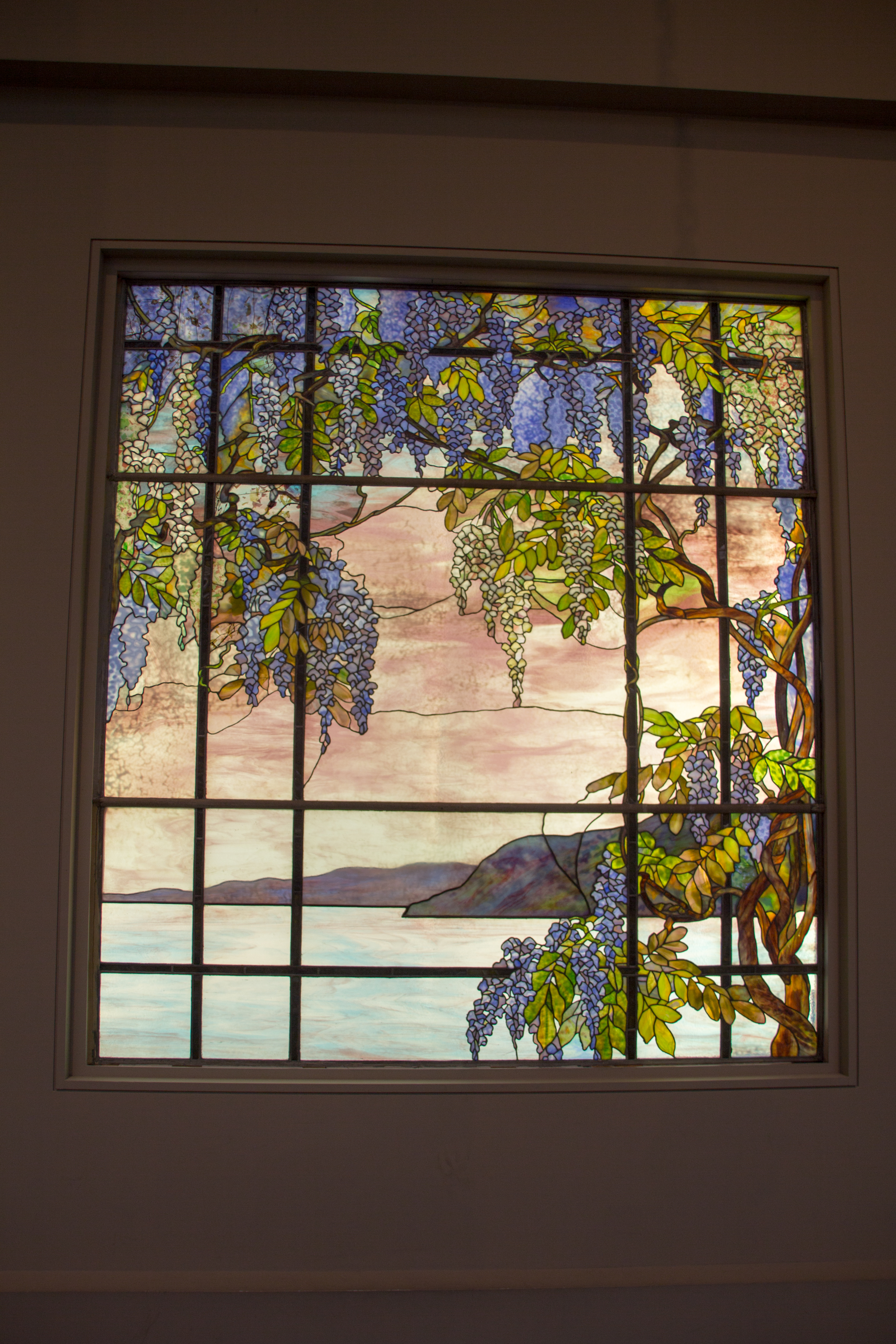
View of Oyster Bay (1908), by Louis Tiffany; named for Tiffany's locale, the piece actually evokes wisteria of the estate. Commissioned by William Skinner, and overseen by Belle, it was for the family's townhouse at 36 E. 38th Street, New York City. Today on display at The Met.

== See also ==
- Belle Skinner
- Joseph Allen Skinner Museum
- William Skinner and Sons
- National Register of Historic Places listings in Hampden County, Massachusetts
