= Joseph Allen Skinner Museum =

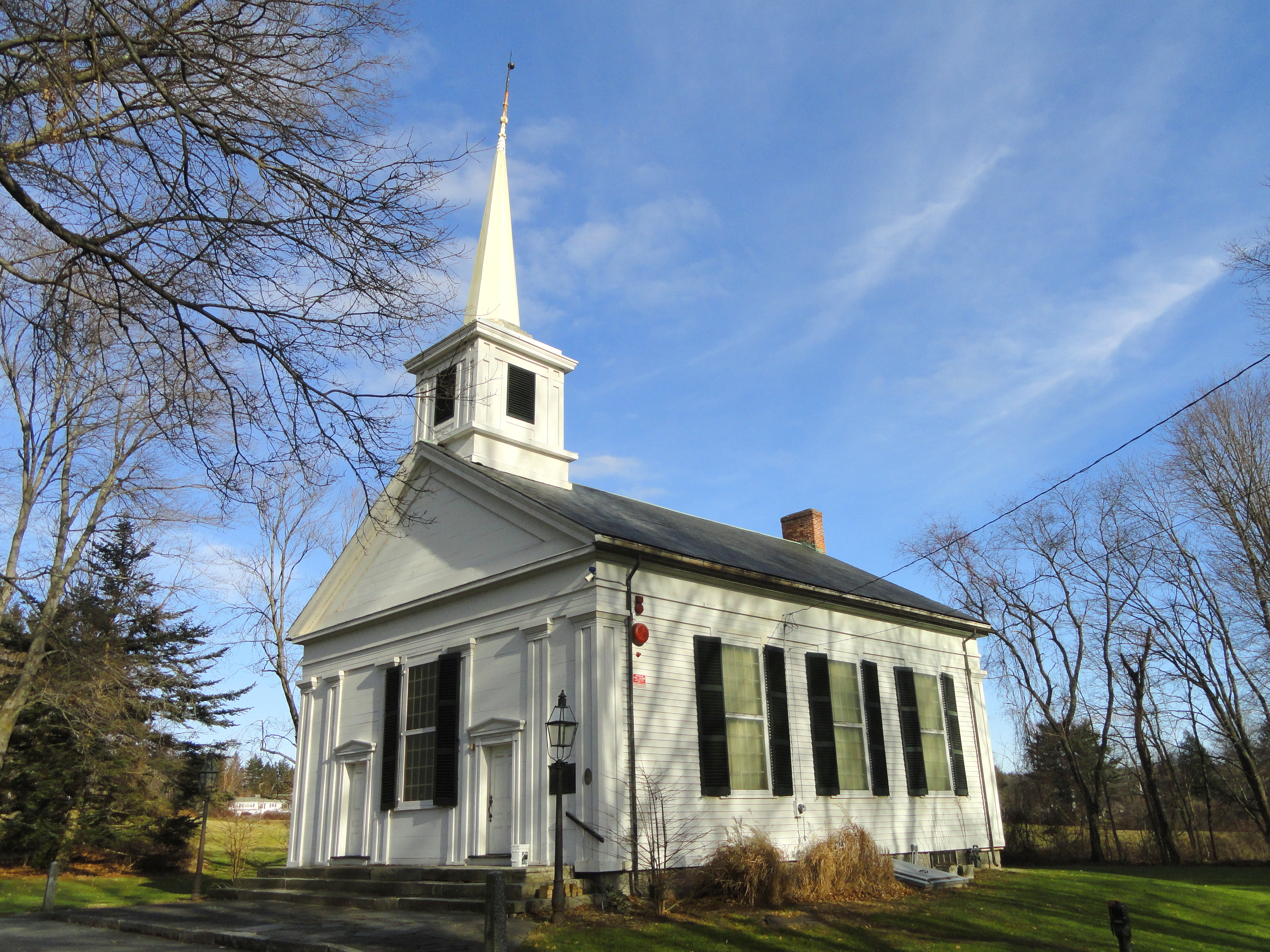
- Skinner Museum in 2012
- Established: 1946
- Location: South Hadley, Massachusetts
- Coordinates: 42°12′17″N 72°37′4″W
- Type: Cabinet of curiosities
- Owner: Mount Holyoke College
- Public transit access: Bus: PVTA 38, 39 (all)
- Website: artmuseum.mtholyoke.edu/collection/joseph-allen-skinner-museum

The Joseph Allen Skinner Museum is a cabinet of curiosities collected by silk magnate Joseph Skinner throughout his life. The collection is housed in the former First Congregational Church of Prescott, Massachusetts, which was built in 1846 and moved to South Hadley by Skinner in 1930 during the creation of the Quabbin Reservoir. Skinner, a benefactor of the college, deeded the entire collection to Mount Holyoke College following his death in 1946. Today the museum is maintained by the college's art museum. With the emergence of the COVID-19 pandemic in 2020, the museum closed temporarily and reopened in 2022.

== See also ==
- Wistariahurst, historical museum in the former Skinner family estate in Holyoke, Massachusetts
