= Carlo Ferrara =

Italian watch brand

Carlo Ferrara is a luxury Italian watch brand known for its collection of timepieces named "Regolatore" that feature hour and minute hands on independent vertical elliptical tracks. The timepieces are manufactured in Italy.
