= Madeleine Blanchet =

Canadian doctor

Madeleine Blanchet OQ FRSC
- Born: 26 April 1934 (age 91); Quebec City, Quebec, Canada
- Education: M.D.
- Alma mater: Université Laval
- Occupation: Doctor

Madeleine Blanchet OQ FRSC (born 26 April 1934) is a Canadian doctor. She was an advisor on the Castonguay-Nepveu Commission and helped transform the public health care system in Quebec.

== Biography ==
Blanchet obtained a bachelor of arts degree at the Convent des Ursulines de Québec and a doctorate in medicine from Université Laval. She also graduated in public health from the Université de Montréal and holds a master of science degree in maternal and child health from Harvard University.

She was chief medical officer at the health unit of Hochelaga, Quebec and in 1967 became medical advisor on epidemiology with the Castonguay-Nepveu Commission, conducting a three-year inquiry into the state of health care in the province. Much of health care in Quebec was then under the jurisdiction of the clergy, and the commission's report recommended a new state-run health insurance policy and health care network, to give broader access to health and psychiatric care for the population.

Claude Castonguay was appointed Quebec's Minister of Health in 1970 and, like several others on the commission, Blanchet joined the ministry's staff to see the commission's blueprint realized and to maintain continuity of the health system. She was head of the Department of Epidemiological Studies at the Ministry of Social Affairs (into which the Ministry of Health had been merged). She was coordinator of the 1972 Nutrition Canada survey and set perinatal and nutrition policies. In 1980 Blanchet was made President of the Social Affairs Council.

In the late 1980s Blanchet collaborated with the research team for another report into the state of Quebec's healthcare. Blanchet gained a reputation for approaching health issues from a social perspective. She was elected to the Royal Society of Canada in 1989 and was made an officer of the National Order of Quebec in 1992.

== Honours ==
- 1980 – Prize of the Canadian Institute of Quebec
- 1989 – Member of the Royal Society of Canada
- 1992 – Officer of the National Order of Quebec
