= Belle Skinner =

American businesswoman and philanthropist

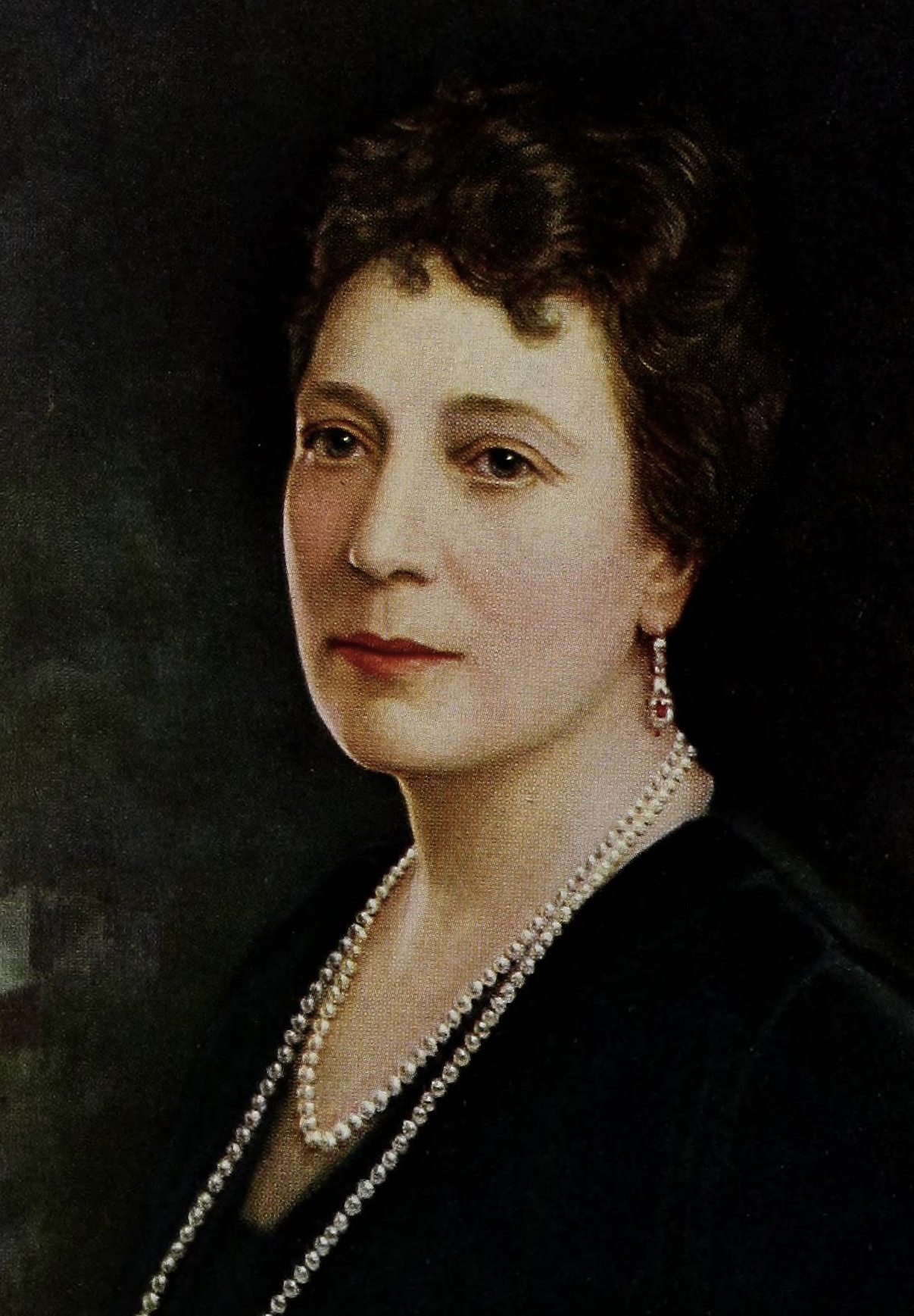
- Oil portrait of Belle Skinner, date unknown
- Born: Ruth Isabel Skinner; April 30, 1866; Williamsburg, Massachusetts, US
- Died: April 9, 1928; Paris, France
- Education: Vassar College
- Awards: Médaille de la Reconnaissance française; Chevalier de la Légion d'honneur

Ruth Isabel Skinner (April 30, 1866 – April 9, 1928) was an American businesswoman and philanthropist. She was a daughter of silk manufacturer William Skinner (1824–1902) and his second wife, the former Sarah Elizabeth Allen (1834–1908). Belle Skinner was a humanitarian and music-lover whose life her brother William memorialized in the construction of the Skinner Hall of Music at Vassar College in 1932. She lived most of her life at the family home, Wistariahurst, in Holyoke, Massachusetts, now a historic site. She renovated and expanded this house to reflect her interests, including adding the music room, where she housed her musical instrument collection, now housed at Yale University.

In 1902, she and her sister Katharine established the Skinner Coffee House in honor of their late father, the coffee house initially hosted women working in Holyoke's mills for social, service, and educational activities but gradually became a meeting place for dozens of men's and women's clubs, the 4-H Club, neighborhood organizations, children's groups, and dancing clubs.

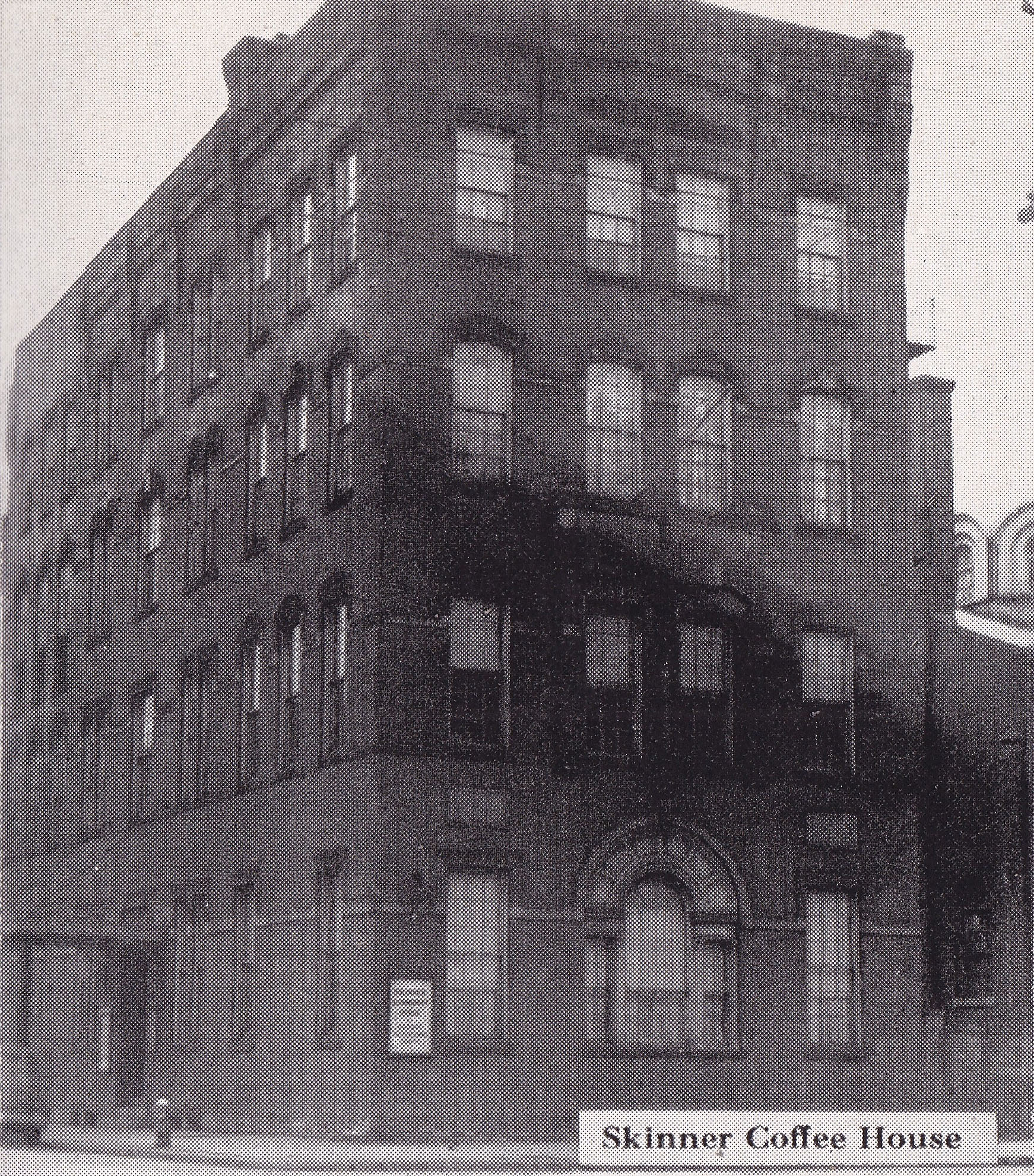
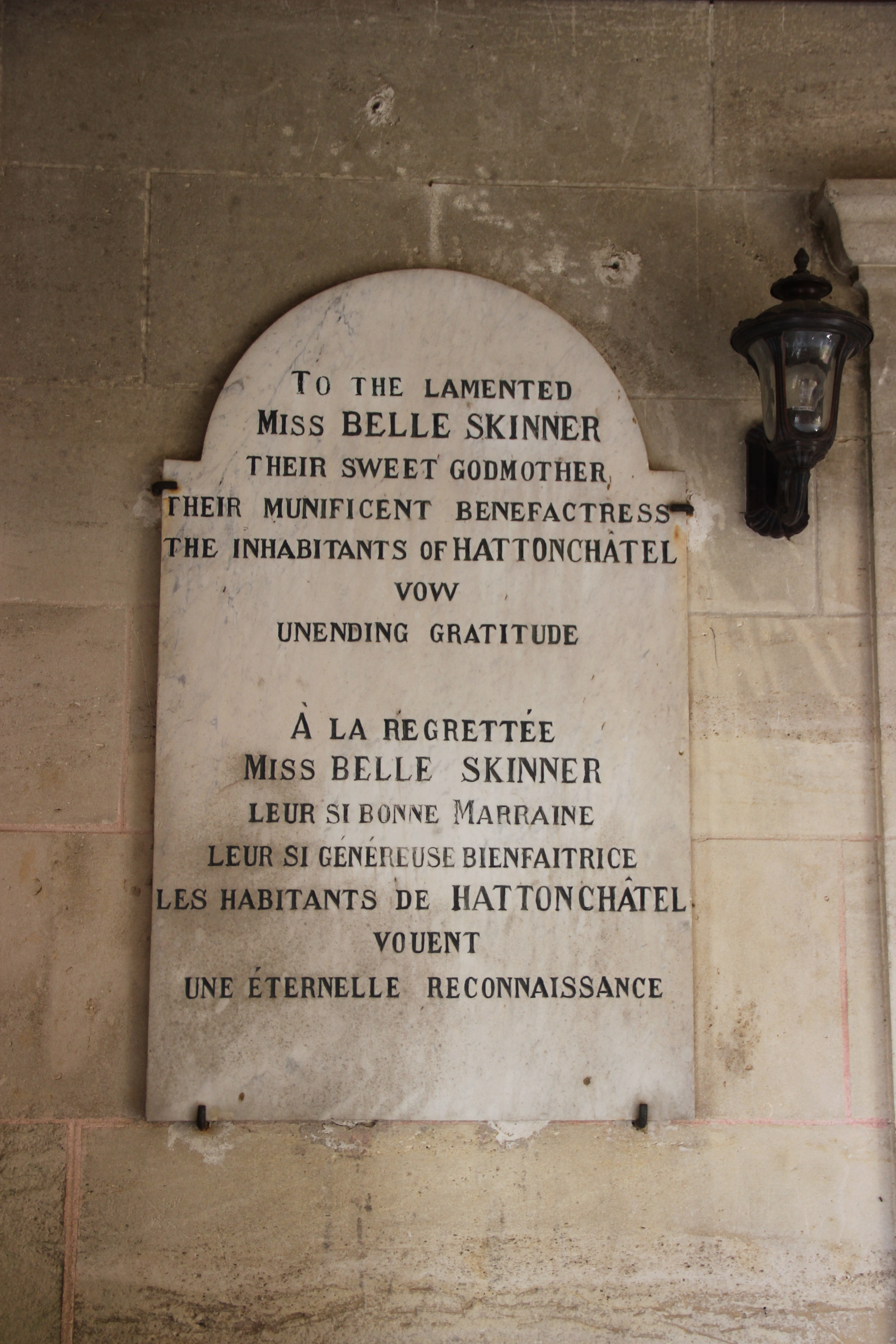
The Skinner Coffee House building, as it appeared in the mid-20th century; a plaque honoring Ms. Skinner in the Château de Hattonchâtel

After the first world war, Belle Skinner helped rebuild the small town of Hattonchâtel and Château de Hattonchâtel. In return for her efforts following the war, Ms. Skinner was presented the Médaille de la Reconnaissance française by future French president and then-commissioner general of Alsace-Lorraine, Alexandre Millerand, in January 1919, at the ministry of foreign affairs in Paris. She also led the effort to rally American cities to adopt French villages during the postwar reconstruction, establishing the American Committee of Villages Libérés in New York City later that year. Holyoke would be the first city to take part in the program, providing a water supply to the village of Apremont-la-Forêt. Two years later on January 26, 1921, she was decorated with the rank of Chevalier in the Légion d'honneur for her continued aid to the French people. While her acts of charity to the French village received general praise and influenced other towns and cities to follow suit, they also drew the ire of nativists and anti-Catholicists, the Klan publication The Fiery Cross lambasted Skinner's efforts "to throw away one million excellent American dollars on two hundred French peasants when a few thousands of that sum would have built them good comfortable homes...is little less than a crime against one's country".

Ultimately Skinner would contribute greatly to her alma mater, providing Vassar College with the first fellowship for foreign studies in 1926, $10,000 for graduates to study history in France, as she had spent time in Paris as a young girl herself soon after her own graduation. While travelling to France to oversee the completion of the Hattonchâtel restoration, Ms. Skinner contracted pneumonia and died on April 9, 1928, her death being reported by papers all across France and the United States. In her memory, her brother William would contribute funds to raise her fellowship to $25,000, as well as fund construction of Skinner Hall for the college's department of music. Belle Skinner's body was brought back to New York City, where a funeral service was held, after which a second was held days later at the Skinner Memorial Chapel of the Holyoke United Congregational Church. She was interred in the family's plot at Forestdale Cemetery.

Posthumously, she has been described by the American Musical Instrument Society as a "pioneer American instrument collector".

== Selected works ==
- "The Christening of the Bell". The Atlantic Monthly. July 1921. pp. 62–66.
- "Christmas at Hattonchatel; A Story of Village Reconstruction in France". The Outlook. December 20, 1922. pp. 707–709.
- "The Month of Mary". The North American Review. Vol. CCXIX, no. 822. May 1924. pp. 673–678. JSTOR 25113305.
