= François Blanchet =

François Blanchet may refer to:

- François Norbert Blanchet (1795–1883), first archbishop of Oregon City
- François Blanchet (physician) (1776–1830), physician, seigneur and politician in Lower Canada
