= Jean Blanchet (watchmaker) =

Jean Blanchet (1767–1852) was a Swiss watchmaker who grew up at Lyon, Lyonnais in France where his father Pierre Blanchet owned a small watch dial factory.

== Life and career ==
Since his youth, Jean Blanchet was fascinated by the French and Swiss watch tradition. He launched his own watch manufacturing firm in 1789. From the beginning, his company was successful throughout Europe. He eventually created his own eponymous line of Swiss watches, Blanchet.

In 1828 Jean Blanchet married Laura Wilson, the daughter of an English ambassador. One year later she gave birth to their son Yves Blanchet. In the age of 20 Yves decided to go to the Royal School of Watchmaking (École Royale de l'Horlogerie de Cluses).

Yves took over the company in 1852, when Jean died during an accident. Four years later he moved close to the Lake of Geneva, in Coppet, to perfect his watchmaking technique and start his own business " Manufacture d'Horologerie Blanchet & Cie".
