= History of the Irish in Holyoke, Massachusetts =

Irish people in Holyoke
Éireannaigh Holyoke
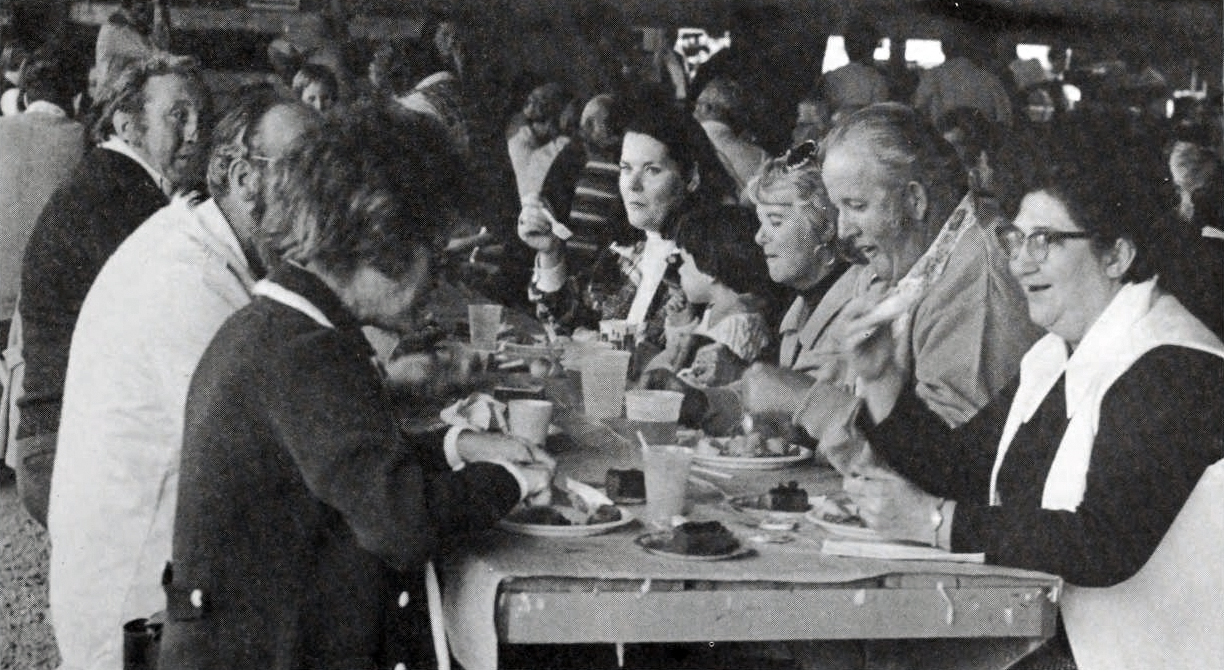
- Attendees of a banquet held by the Holyoke Irish Centennial Anniversary Committee, 1973

Total population
- 6,076 (2010)

Languages
- American English, Irish language (in 19th century, rare)

From the beginning of the city's history as the western bank of Springfield, Irish families have resided in and contributed to the development of the civics and culture of Holyoke, Massachusetts. Among the first appellations given to the city were the handles "Ireland", "Ireland Parish", or "Ireland Depot", after the village was designated the 3rd Parish of West Springfield in 1786. Initially occupied by a mixture of Yankee English and Irish Protestant families, many of whom belonged to the Baptist community of Elmwood, from 1840 through 1870 the area saw a large influx of Irish Catholic workers, immigrants to the United States, initially from the exodus of the Great Famine. During that period Irish immigrants and their descendants comprised the largest demographic in Holyoke and built much of the early city's infrastructure, including the dams, canals, and factories. Facing early hardships from Anti-Irish sentiment, Holyoke's Irish would largely build the early labor movement of the city's textile and paper mills, and remained active in the national Irish nationalist and Gaelic revival movements of the United States, with the Holyoke Philo-Celtic Society being one of 13 signatory organizations creating the Gaelic League of America, an early 20th century American counterpart of Conradh na Gaeilge.

Changes in industry and culture, and successive waves of different immigrant demographics would displace the Irish community to an extent, however the demographic remained an active identity in civic life throughout the 20th century. The Irish community today organizes the largest public event held in Holyoke annually, the Holyoke Saint Patrick's Day Parade. With representatives from surrounding towns and cities, the parade is a regional celebration for people of Irish ancestry. Today people of Irish ethnicity are the second largest demographic in Holyoke and the largest non-Hispanic group, representing about 15% of all residents, and 17% of residents of Hampden County, the second-largest single group by ancestry.

== History ==
=== Early settlement and Ireland Parish ===
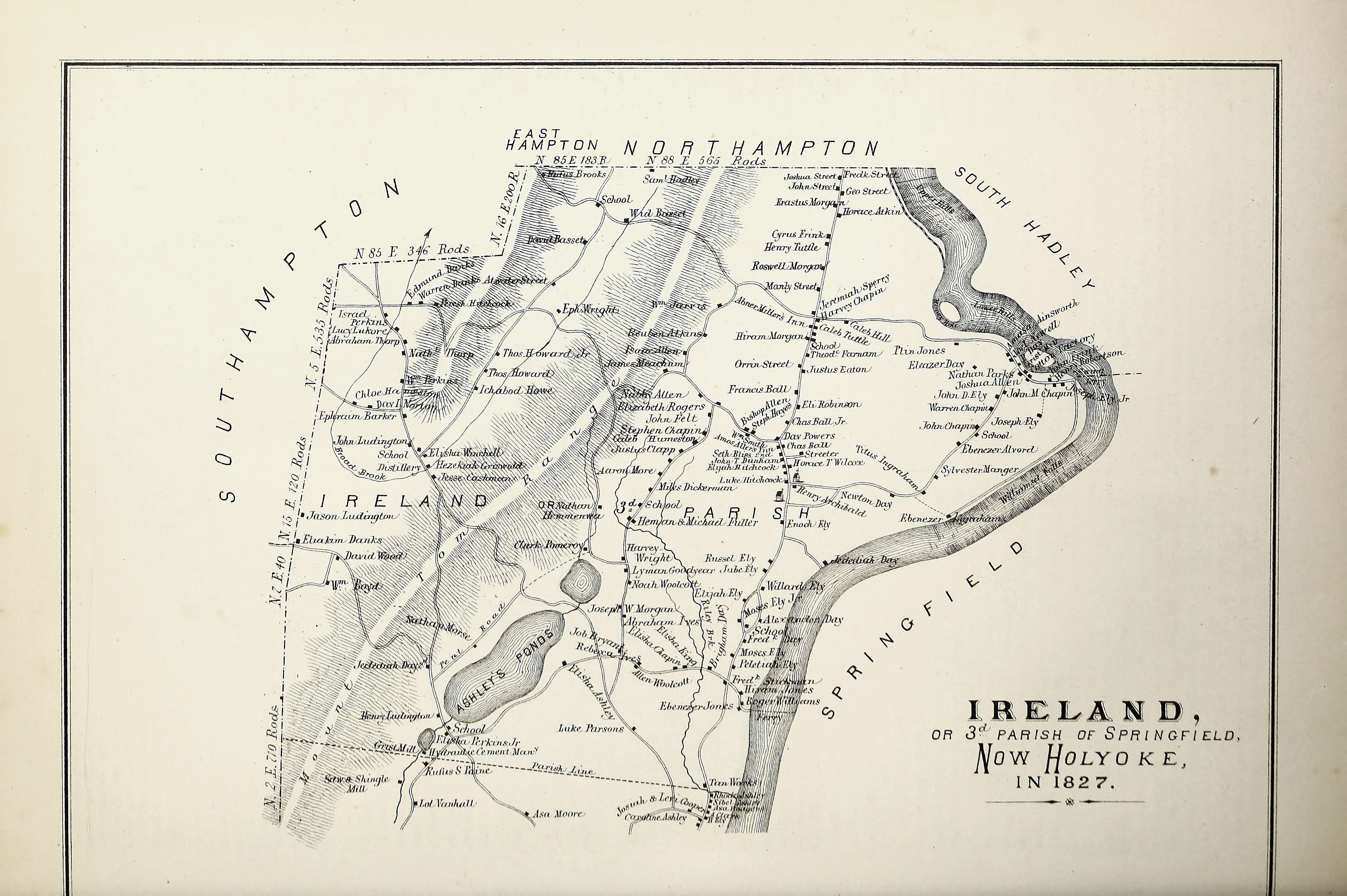
One of the earliest maps of Holyoke, as "Ireland, or 3^{d} Parish of Springfield", often corrupted as "Ireland Parish", 1827

While the earliest settlers of Springfield would largely be of Yankee English stock, the first of the residents of the 3rd Parish of West Springfield were Irish immigrants who began settling in the region before the construction of the dam and industrialization that followed, granting the area the name "Ireland" or "Ireland Parish." Colonists had claimed lands by 1655, and early accounts refer to John Riley as the first permanent settler of Holyoke, but though Riley owned 28 acres along "Riley's Brook" (Tannery Brook in modern-day Ingleside), his daughters Mary and Margaret, and their Irish Protestant husbands, Joseph Ely and William MacCranny, would first establish their homesteads in 1667. By the time West Springfield was partitioned in 1707, numerous Irish families had moved to the Parish, and eventually it was chartered as such, the 3rd Parish of West Springfield, on July 7, 1786. Quickly it gained the nickname Ireland, for in those days a number of other families had joined the descendants of the Elys and MacCrannys; these names have also been in the past combined into the better known Ireland Parish handle.

=== Ireland Depot era ===
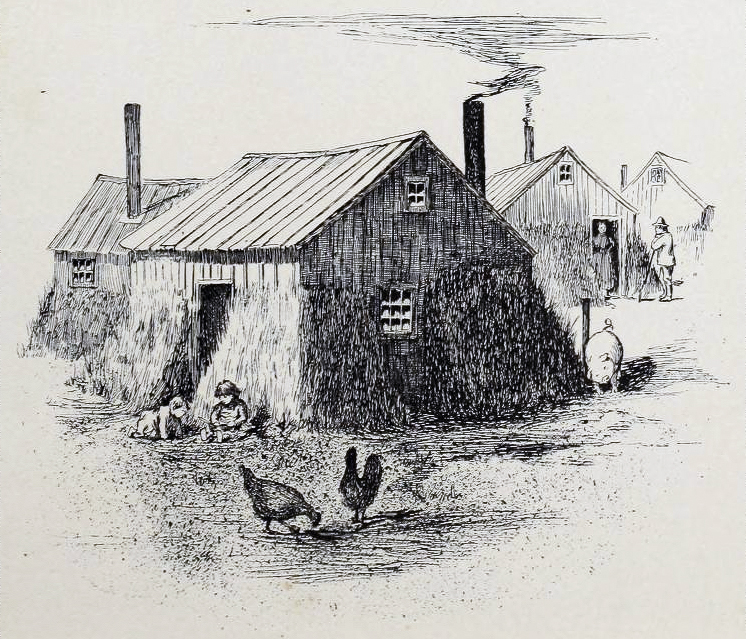
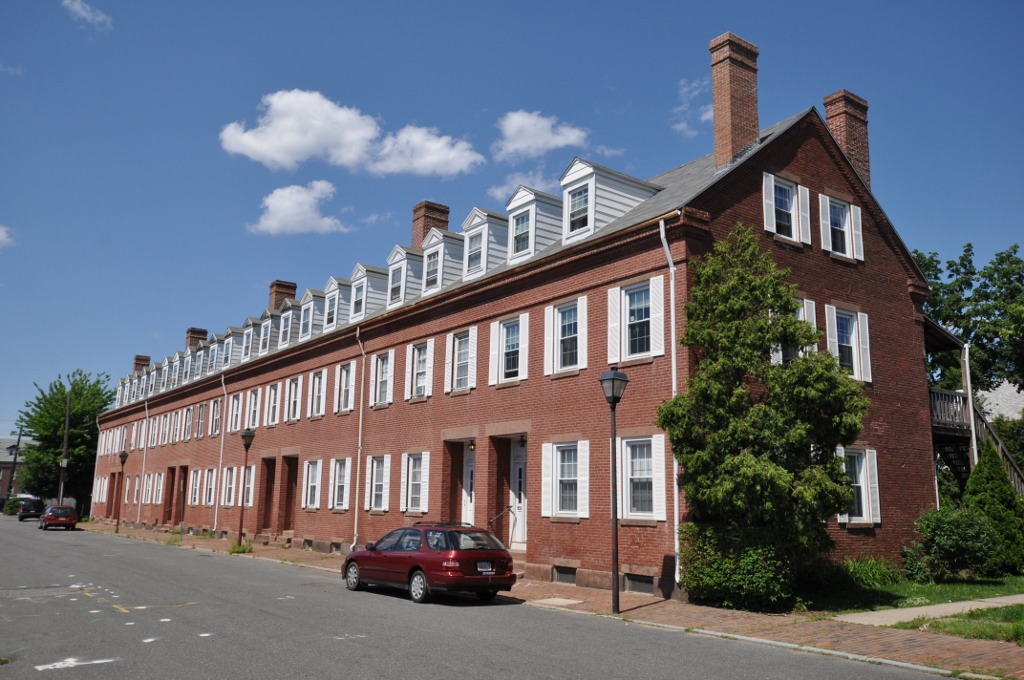
The contrast between "The Patch" (top), and 1840s worker housing in "The Flats" (bottom); within a generation most Irish laborers would find improved conditions representative of the latter, as "New City" and its infrastructure were built from field and forest

The growth of the Irish community up until this time can be found in birth records of West Springfield, of which Holyoke was its 3rd parish. In 1847 there were 14 births, none of which were of Irish surnames, but by 1848, 19 of 87 were, and by 1849 105 out of 221 West Springfield births were of Irish parentage. Many of the new arrivals came to find work in the construction of the dam and the factories that would be built with it. In the fall of 1848 the Hadley Falls Company put their building lots on the market, and of these lots, many were purchased by recently-arrived Irish. From these arrivals there formed three small villages, the abodes of the Hadley Falls Company Housing, otherwise known as the "North Flats" at the time, designed by mill engineer John Chase, and built by one Charles MacClellan. Long lost to history there existed two smaller shanty villages, "The Patch", lying where Pulaski Park stands today, and "The Bush", a series of dwellings in the fields of South Holyoke. Another early settlement, simply referred to as "The Field", would be rechristened "Ireland Depot" with the arrival of the railroad in 1845, today being part of the broader-defined "The Flats" or more specifically "Depot Hill", which was used for tillage predating the development of the grid and canal system.

In contrast with the skilled-labor class and the rowhouses of the Hadley Falls Company in The Flats, the early dwellings of The Patch were primitive, ephemeral, and described as shanties. Construction of these structures was described in Clifton Johnson's Hampden County as "a shanty built by putting four upright posts, to which rough boards were nailed ... a roof of overlapping boards was put on top, places cut for a door and windows ... Inside the shanty the earth was smoothed ... and a rude floor of boards put down". These buildings typically housed a single family, however some were boarding houses for large groups of workers, the largest described as being 40 feet long at its longest wall and housing 30 people. Livestock would often be seen milling freely about between such buildings in areas like The Patch.

Tragedy struck in 1849, when the immigrant colonies suffered a severe epidemic of cholera. Men, women and children would get sick in the evening, and perish by the morning; with no cemetery other than one across the river in Chicopee, the epidemic spread quickly and acutely. It was reported to have resulted in hundreds of deaths, and the outbreak resulted in the deaths of 10% of the city's early Irish population. Part of a national phenomena, the cause of the outbreak was likely from the unsanitary conditions on ships bringing large groups seeking refuge from the Great Famine. Prior to the construction of Prospect Park on the site and the construction of a modern sewage system, conditions at The Patch led to outbreaks that would persist for its residents there in the ensuing decades.

In 1850 following a meeting of the Hadley Falls Company, the New City was dubbed Holyoke. Emigration from Ireland to Holyoke would continue well into the 20th century and yet, with some irony it was after the changing of the name "Ireland Parish" from the New City to an English surname, that the area changed from more predominantly English Yankee, into a city substantially more Irish in character. With the emergence of industry and a new wave of immigration, by 1855 more than a third of residents in Holyoke were of Irish origin.

=== Tradesmen and builders ===
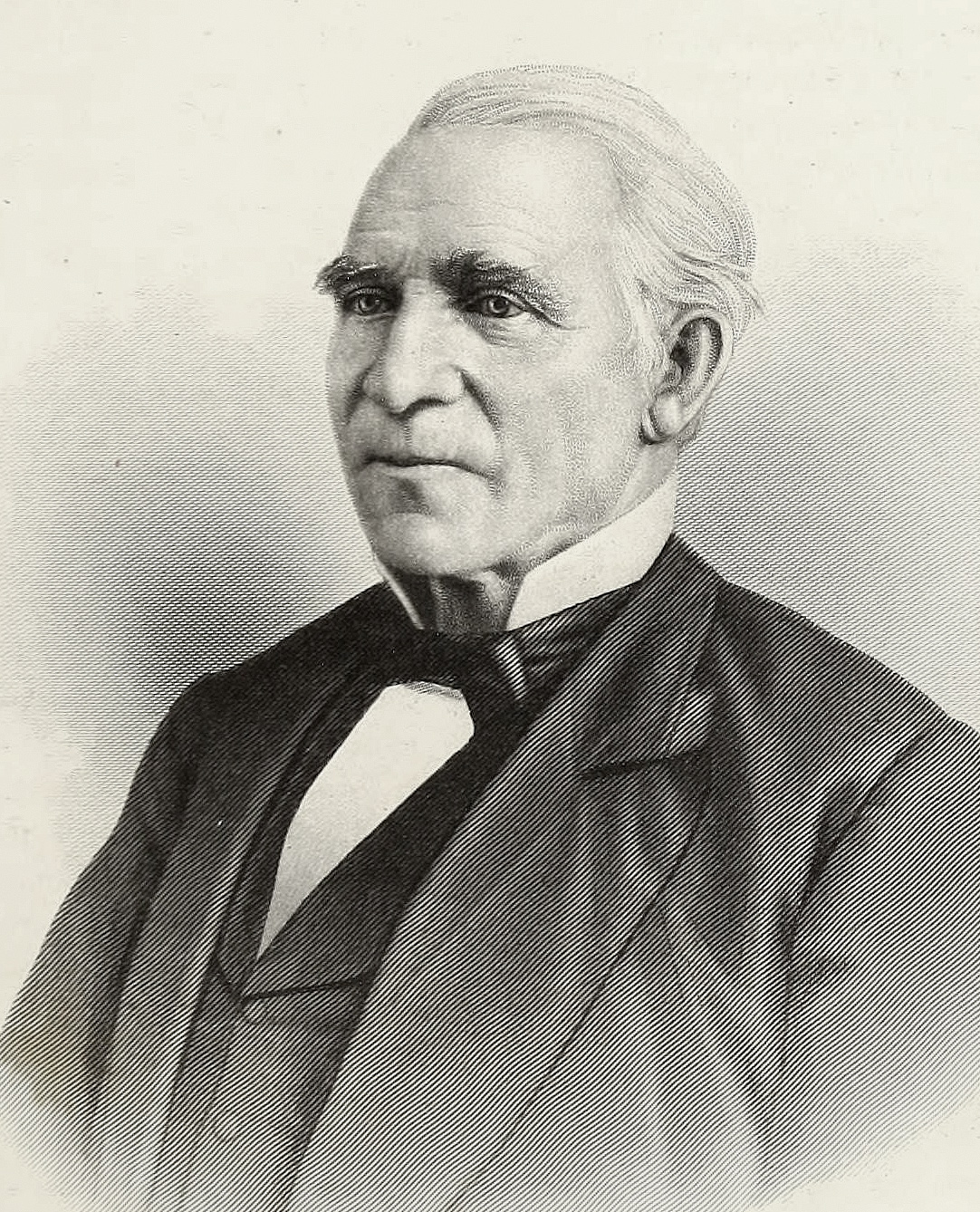
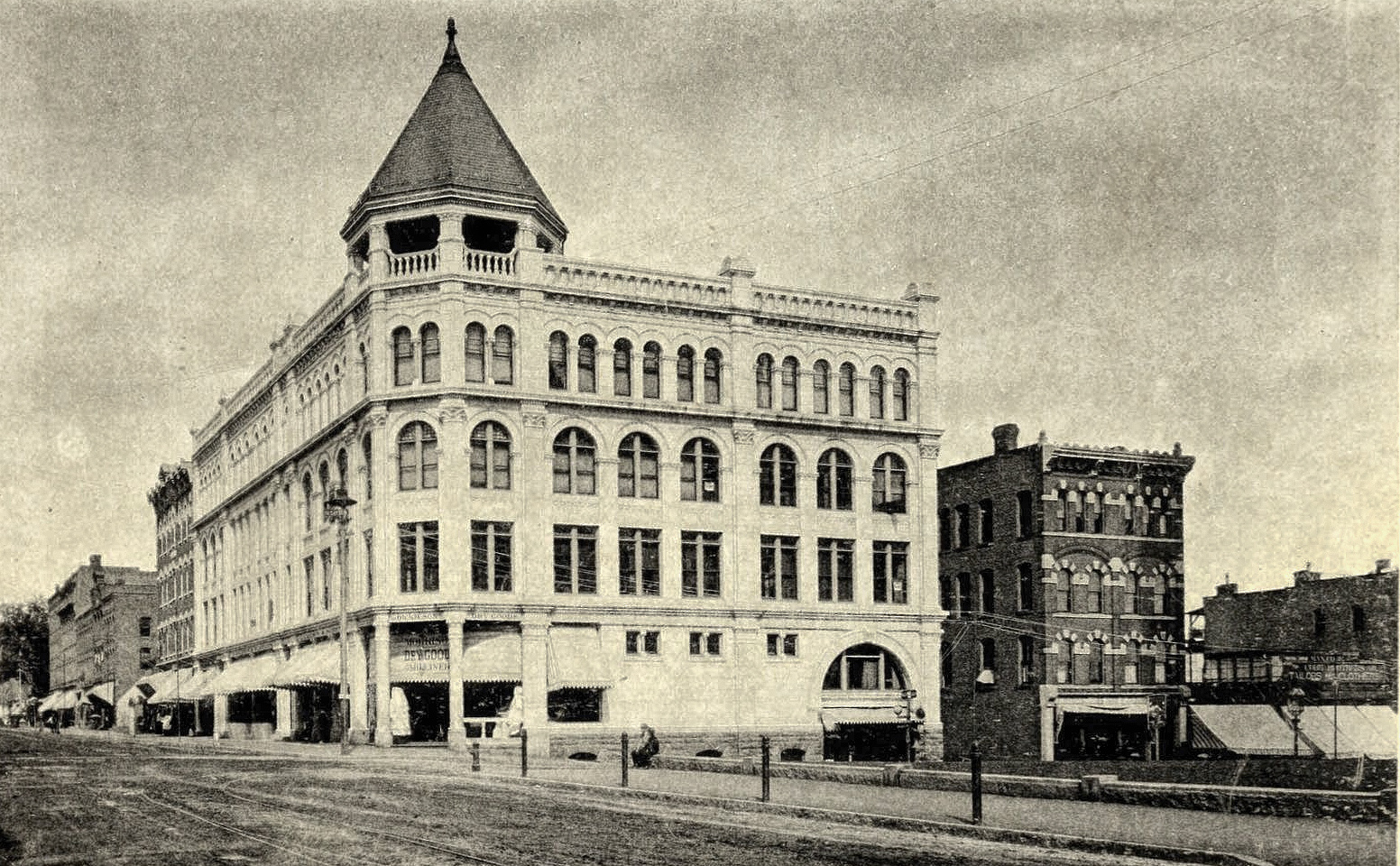
Left to right: John Delaney (1815–1887), and "Delaney's Marble Block", or Marble Hall, as it appeared on the corner of Dwight and High Street the late 1880s

Irish immigration to Holyoke would continue well into the 20th century. The majority of immigrants to the city would be predominantly Irish in the first decades of the city's existence, from the famine refugees of the 1840s through the later factory worker arrivals of the 1890s. By 1900, larger groups of French-Canadians had begun to arrive, however with their early arrival and the separation of French language institutions, the Irish would however come to define Holyoke's identity as founders. They, along a much smaller and separate German demographic, would establish much of the city's early social, political, and labor institutions.

Although many of Holyoke's earliest arrivals would be farmers, these would-be laborers included a number of tradesmen such as carpenters, masons, and blacksmiths, some of the industrial city's workers who would construct its dam, canals, and factories in subsequent decades. This was reflected in a shifting demography: in 1860, three in four skilled construction workers were Yankee Americans; by 1880 fewer than one in five reflected the same demographic, the vast majority being Irish tradesmen who would define the labor community of unions and local politics for virtually the entirety of the city's history. One of Ireland's notable sculptor's Jerome Connor, was brought to the United States as a boy as his stonemason father, Patrick Connor, was among Holyoke's early tradesmen.

Despite anti-Irish sentiment in the United States during the 19th century, the Irish were split into two classes, with about 50% working in industry between 1860 and 1900, and 25–36% represented in professional services, such as lawyers, architects, bankers, and other occupations, during the same period, exceeding the proportions of the other immigrant demographics and native-born populations in such occupations during that time.

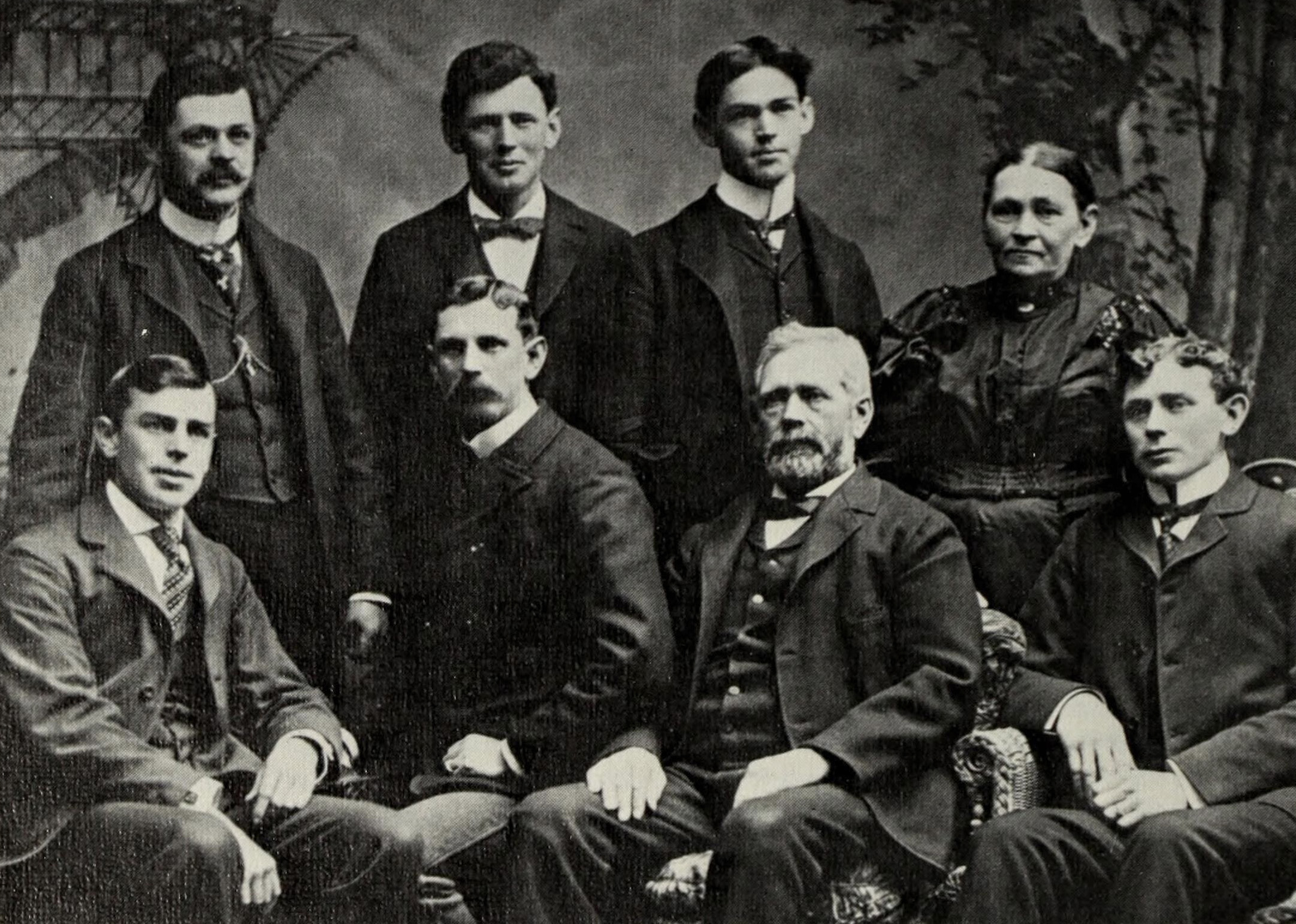
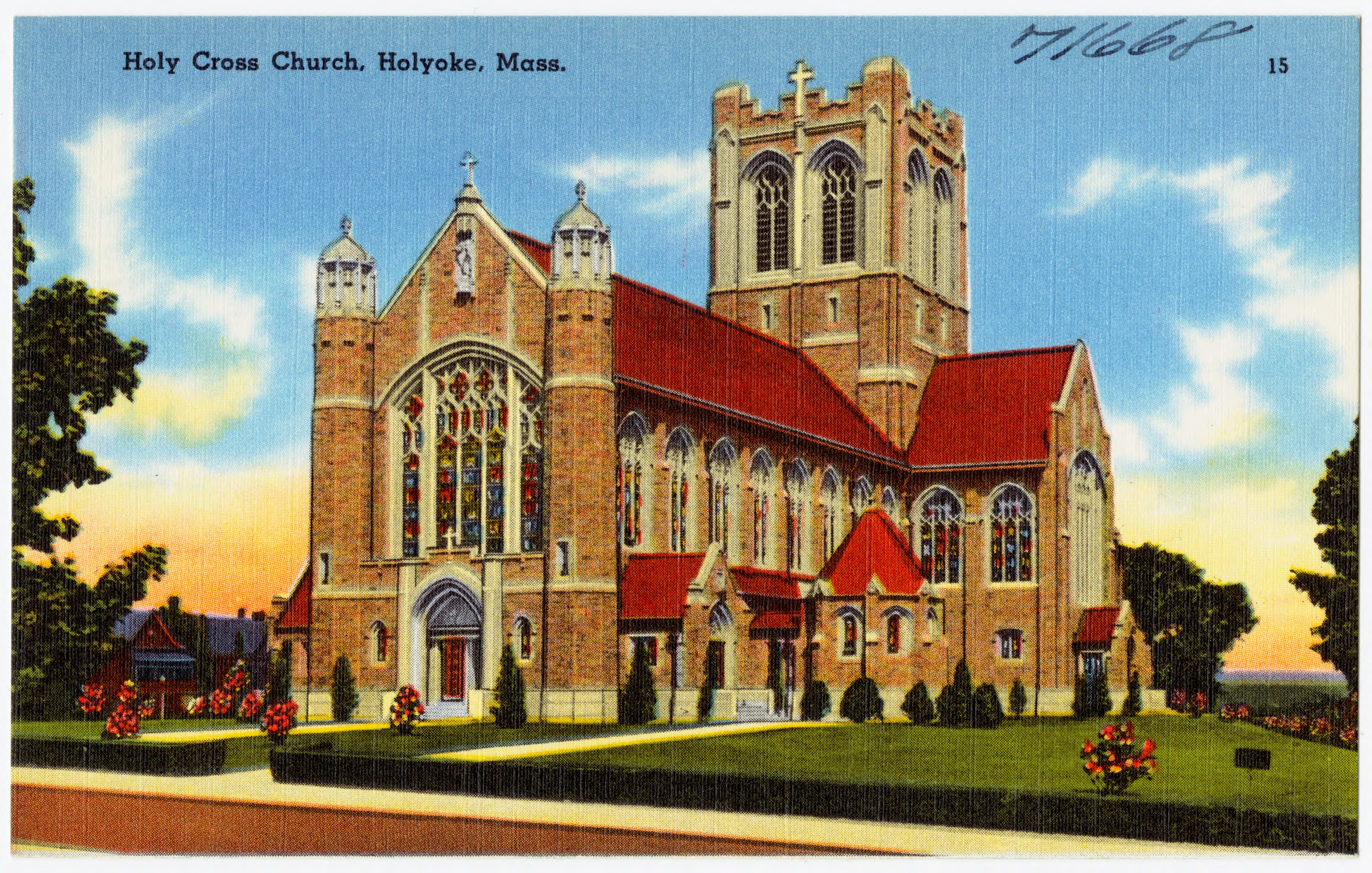
Top to bottom: Johanna (née Brassil), Daniel O'Connell and Sons, c. 1908; the Holy Cross Church, now Our Lady of the Cross, erected by the Daniel O'Connell's Sons firm in 1926 when they incorporated under that name, one of many projects the firm would complete, including the W. E. B. DuBois Library at UMass Amherst and Springfield's Monarch Place

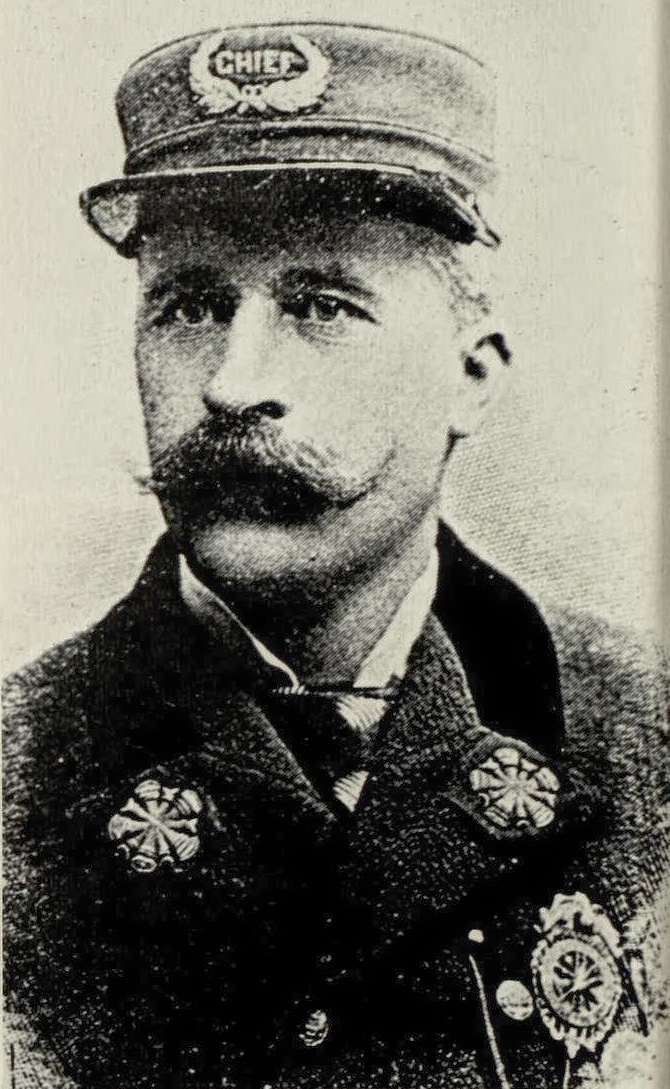
Fire Chief John T. Lynch, a fixture in Holyoke for decades, best remembered for his bravery as a lieutenant in rescuing parishioners in the 1875 Precious Blood Church fire

Among the earliest arrivals in Holyoke's workmen and contractors was John Delaney, a stonemason. By the time he would arrive in Holyoke in April 1849, Delaney had previously worked on the Croton Water-works supplying the City of New York, Fort Warren in Boston, and the Lowell Canal System. In his time in Holyoke he would become known for supervising the construction of the Holyoke Canal System, as well as a number of its mills, and oversaw the construction of Holyoke City Hall's foundations. In the latter years of his career, Delaney wished to build "a worthy monument to leave behind him", and purchased the old Second Congregational Church that once sat across from City Hall in 1884. By January 1885, work had begun in razing the old structure and plans had been drawn up by architect James A. Clough to build a grand building made of Sutherland Falls marble from Vermont, from a quarry owned by Vermont Governor Redfield Proctor's family, with foundational ashlar facing Dwight Street taken from Delaney's quarry at Mount Tom. When Proctor would visit Holyoke, Springfield, or one of its surrounding towns thereafter, he would make a point to pass that corner of Dwight and High "to see how his marble weathered." Unfortunately Delaney's monument to Holyoke's tradesmen would succumb to the wrecking ball after 65 years, for by 1950 its tenant the W. T. Grant Department Store sought a more modern building. Demolished in January and February 1950, a total of 195 trucks hauled the dismantled marble South Hadley, where it was used as ground fill in a new housing development. Today the legacy of Delaney and his men remains most visible in the stone facades of the city's canal system.

A prominent figure in Holyoke's printing industry was one Michael J. Doyle. Born in Ireland on September 27, 1872 to Thomas and Mary Doyle (née Murphy), Doyle would arrive in America with his parents in 1880. Educated in Holyoke Public Schools, he would eventually take up an engraving apprenticeship in Springfield, and began a firm under the handle "M. J. Doyle Printing Company" in 1893, was elected to the board of aldermen in 1897 and water commission in 1904, running many jobs for the city's annual reports and publications through the early 20th century.

Daniel O'Connell was one of the most influential of the early Irish tradesmen. Born in County Kerry in 1833, he and his family arrived in Chicopee Falls and subsequently Holyoke in 1847. His first job was as a water boy for the workers of the first, ill-fated dam. In 1864 he began serving as superintendent of streets, an early counterpart of the superintendent of the department of public works. Following the election of Mayor William Ruddy in 1879, O'Connell was called into the new mayor's offices and told to put four new men on his payroll, and initially to fire the six he already had under employ. Even after Ruddy retracted this demand and told O'Connell to simply add the four as a political favor, O'Connell would not abide and resigned, starting an independent contracting business. The next morning William Skinner knocked on O'Connell's front door and after discussing the circumstances, hired him to pave the yards of the Skinner and Sons Silk mills in the city. The first O'Connell would go on to serve as one of the subcontractors for the granite Holyoke Dam, and would work on a number of other projects including the construction of the New Bedford reservoir. Following his death in 1916, his sons and their descendants would continue his legacy, formally incorporating the company as Daniel O'Connell's Sons in 1926, and going on to work on a number of major projects in the Commonwealth, the broader United States, and as far away as South America. Among their notable works are the world's tallest academic library, W.E.B. DuBois Library at UMass Amherst, Springfield's Monarch Place, Interstate 391, Steven Holl's Simmons Hall for MIT, as well as the Frank Gehry-designed Richard B. Fisher Center for the Performing Arts of Bard College.

=== Second wave, labor, and trade unions ===
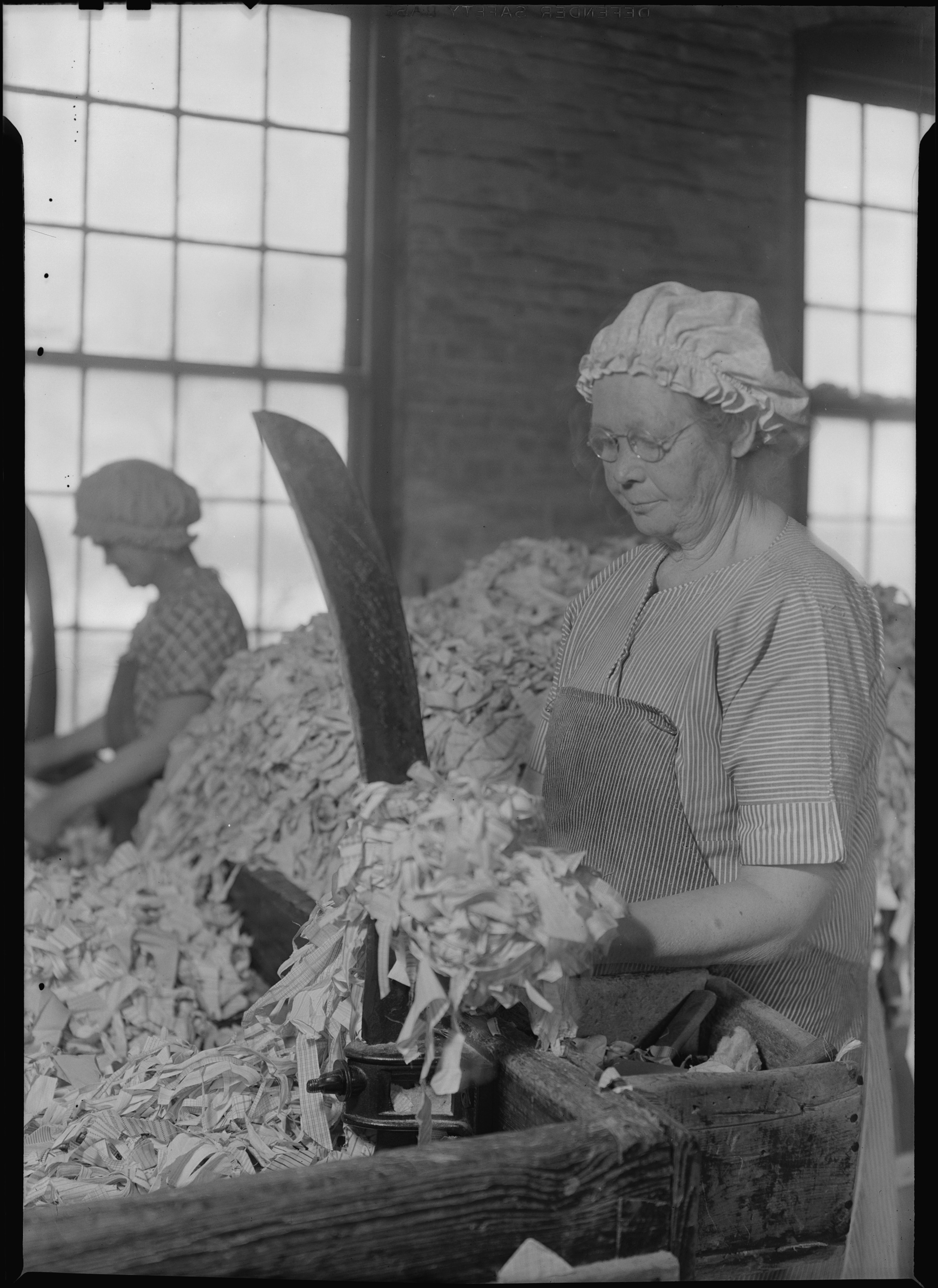
"Rag girls" cut up cotton rags used in making fine writing paper in a Holyoke mill of the American Writing Paper Company, c. 1937

In the decades after the Great Famine of Ireland up until the Great Depression, a number of single Irish women would immigrate to the United States, following the footsteps of families and male relatives who had come before. Many would take up work as domestic servants for wealthy families in larger cities, and while some of Holyoke's wealthier mill owners like the Skinner family would have servants in their homes, many of Holyoke's would find work in the city's textile factories. Holyoke would also have among the first female police officers in the Commonwealth, Mary McMahon, who was appointed to that role in 1917 and retired after marrying in 1921. Although historian Marcella Kelly would place her as the first female police officer in the Commonwealth, and her appointment predated Boston's first by several years, early accounts also refer to previous woman officers in Springfield and Northampton at the time of her tenure.

Many of the earliest factory worker arrivals saw new tensions between their unions and the arrival of French-Canadian workers, who while some would participate in unionism elsewhere in New England, were largely unorganized in Holyoke and brought in by mill owners to undermine the workers' leverage for better wages and working hours. In the successive generations more ethnic groups would be taken into the fold but much of the city's earliest union movements comprised Irish and German laborers. Irish identity in the working class community became synonymous with unionism, as unions gradually took on the roles associated with ethnic organizations in public meetings and cultural events. Examples of such trade unions include a local of the United Brotherhood of Carpenters and Joiners of America which was organized in the city soon after the formation of that trade union in 1881, and also the Holyoke Irish role in founding the United Brotherhood of Paperworkers. Ultimately representing workers of all backgrounds, it first began as a social club within the city's Irish trade unionists known as the Eagle Lodge, receiving charter as Local 1 from the American Federation of Labor in May 1883. Even as the organization grew, it would remain tied to the community through the 20th century, among other occasions, the city would host the International Brotherhood's president in 1913, and during Holyoke's centennial in 1973, the union, then a member of the AFL-CIO, would be one of the ceremonies sponsors. The union would reorganize and merge several times over the subsequent decades, eventually becoming the Paper, Allied-Industrial, Chemical and Energy Workers International Union in 1999, ultimately folding into United Steelworkers in 2005.

Anna Sullivan, who first unionized Holyoke's silk industry

One of Holyoke's leading figures in organized labor into the twentieth century was Anne B Sullivan (née Burns), whom Senator Ted Kennedy would describe as the "first lady of labor" at a testimonial dinner in 1975. Sullivan, born in Holyoke in 1903 to an Irish father and second generation Irish and German mother, began her career in labor joining the Weavers Union in 1932 and, inspired by the Textile Workers Strike of 1934, by she had 1936 had organized workers to join the Textile Workers Union at William Skinner and Sons, the first mill in Western Massachusetts to unionize under the CIO. Up until this time, workers were offered no real guarantee of consistent pay or work, with one example being a mill which would lay off its employees for two weeks at the holidays, with no pay at Christmas. Besides the dangers of the loud, heavy machinery used in the mills and common respiratory illnesses from particulate in the air, foremen could fire workers for any reason, and with women workers, as Sullivan recalled, "if [the foreman] liked the color of your hair today you were alright. If he didn't like it tomorrow, good bye." By the end of the 1920s, the urgency of additional work for the same wages as well as a practice of fining workers for flaws made in satins were part of the impetus which led to unionization at Skinner's mills in the next decade. Despite labor being replaced by successive generations of immigrant labor, and the movement of many factories to cheaper operations in the South, part of what Sullivan attributed to the union's leverage was the skill required to be a weaver, especially in silk, which meant months of training with each hire, which didn't even guarantee mastery from each worker's efforts.

Sullivan would go on to serve as manager of the Holyoke Joint Board of Textile Workers from 1944 to 1966, and the Berkshire Joint Board in Pittsfield from 1958 until 1966 when deindustrialization severely reduced textile work. Sullivan would also run once for Congress in 1950 on the Democratic ticket, losing to incumbent John W. Heselton, part of her reason for running being to fight rising food costs attributed to shortages from the Korean War. During her campaign she gathered more than 1000 signatures in a petition to President Truman stating in part that "we pledge ourselves to support our soldiers, in Korea by refusing to hoard foodstuffs ... We earnestly petition you to request the Congress to roll back prices to their levels of June 15, 1950, and to request the Anti-Trust Division of the Department of Justice to investigate whether a conspiracy exists to profiteer in food in violation of our laws." Even after entering state government in 1966 as a representative for Springfield's office of the Massachusetts Commission Against Discrimination, she remained active member of the Springfield-Chicopee-Westfield Labor Council and on the board of directors of the Springfield Chapter of the American Red Cross. In a memorial address delivered before Congress Rep. Edward P. Boland lionized her as a pioneer in Massachusetts labor, a good friend, and described her as a close personal friend of John F. Kennedy.

=== Baseball ===
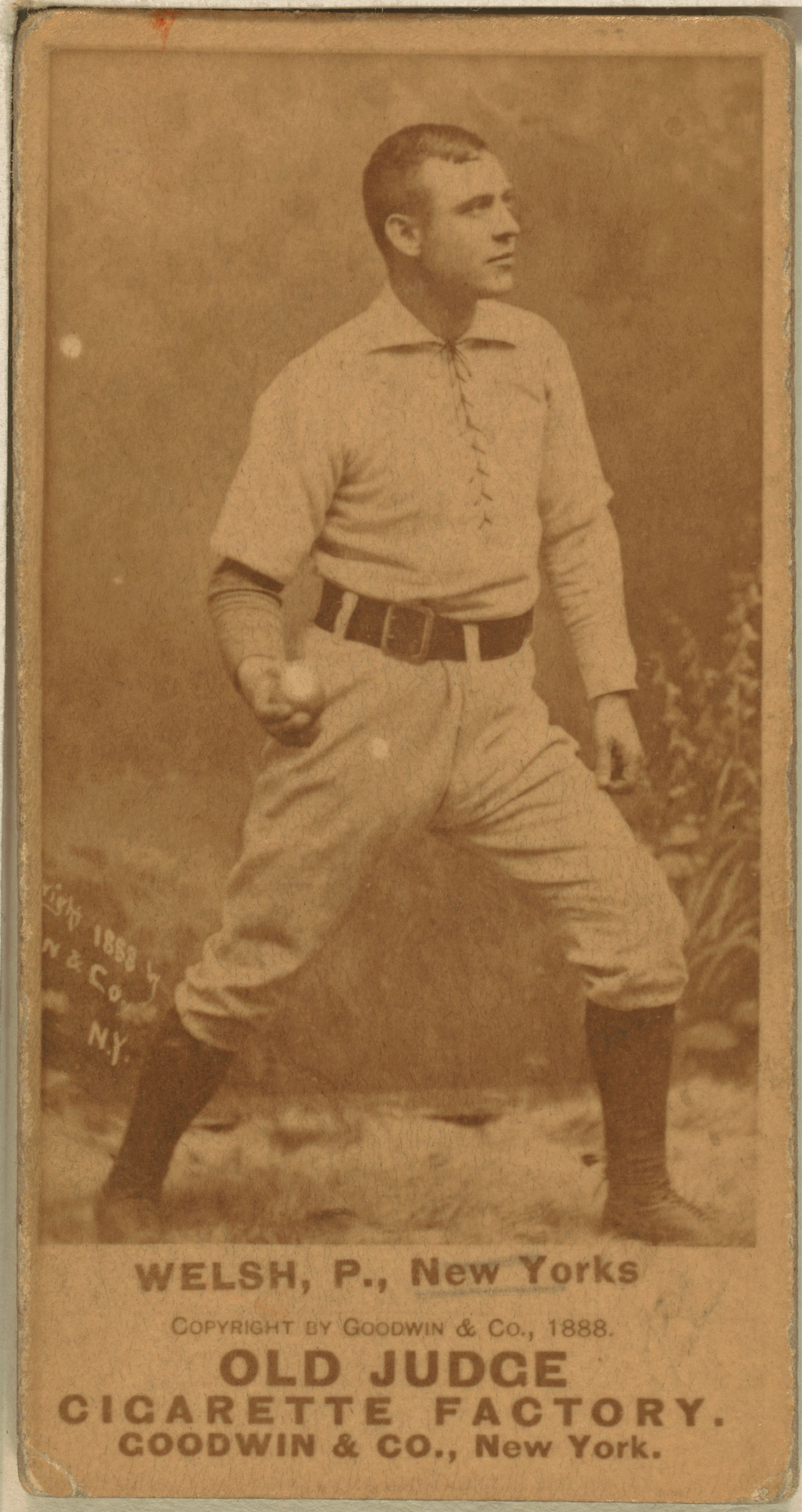
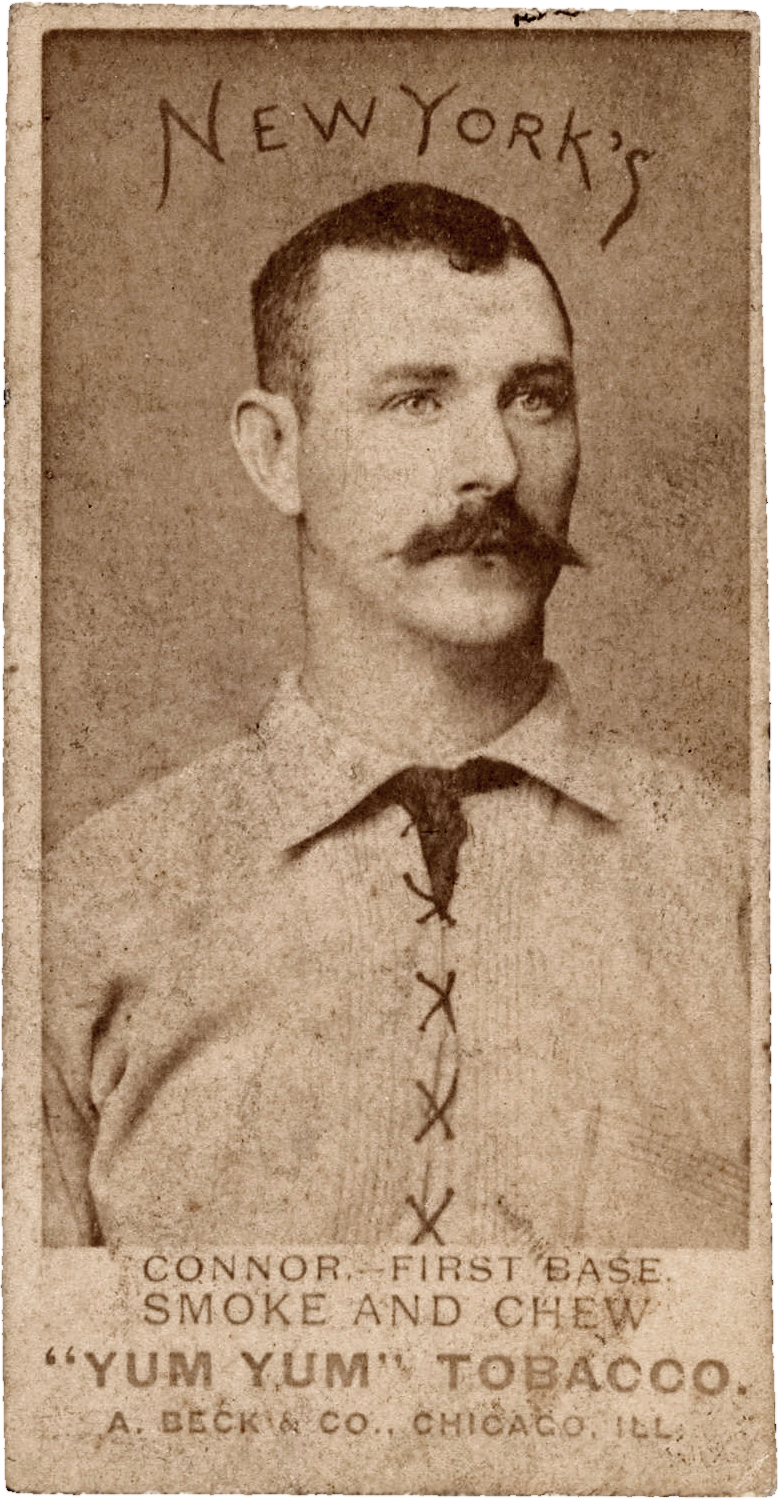
Mickey Welch (left), and Roger Connor (right), both MLB Baseball Hall of Fame inductees who started early in their careers on the roster of the Holyoke Shamrocks

In the national context, Irish players were a key part of professional baseball in its formative years. Between 1871 and 1920, 23 percent of all baseball players were Irish or Irish-American, with about 58 percent born in American towns outside the largest 14 cities of the United States. In his 2014 book The Irish and the Making of American Sport, 1835-1920, historian Patrick Redmond, would describe Holyoke specifically as "crucial to baseball's Irish history", with 19 major league players born in the city, 10 of whom were Irish Americans from during that period. South Holyoke, known as Tigertown in the 1870s, was a frequent venue for baseball and earned its name from the tensions that ran between competing teams, particularly between Holyoke and Springfield, including at least one such game where a squad of police larger than both teams was required to break up a riot that had broken out between the two.

Though not on any Holyoke professional team, there would be a number of players during this era born in the city, such as Tommy Tucker, and Tommy Dowd. However more than being the hometown of such players, for a time the city hosted a number of baseball teams itself. A wealth of largely-Irish baseball clubs were formed in the 19th century and teams named the "Shamrocks" abounded, however of the period between 1871 and 1920, only the Holyoke Shamrocks would attain professional status, competing in the National Association and the International League.

Records for Holyoke Shamrocks are decidedly fragmented, however during their 1879 season with the National Association, the team won the league pennant with a 23-14 record, with two future inductees of the Baseball Hall of Fame on their roster, Mickey Welch and Roger Connor, as well as four additional players who would later play in the MLB: Larry Corcoran, Jerry Dorgan, Peter Gillespie, and Fergy Malone. Roger Connor, became known for his repeated home runs, knocking balls across the fields of Tigertown into the Connecticut River. Boss Bob Ferguson, of Springfield, Massachusetts, took notice of the young Connor in Holyoke, and signed him on to the majors in the Troy Trojans, launching a long baseball career. Raised in Holyoke, Jack "Dirty Jack" Doyle would go on to become the city's police commission from 1908 to 1909 before returning to baseball as an umpire, and eventual scout for the Chicago Cubs. Even in a varied career across the United States, he would call the city his home his entire life, eventually retiring there.

Although Irish identity would be less prominent in later baseball teams, Holyoke's pioneers were predecessors of many successive professional minor league teams through the next century, including the Holyoke Paperweights, Holyoke Millers, and the collegiate Valley Blue Sox today.

=== Representation on Beacon Hill ===
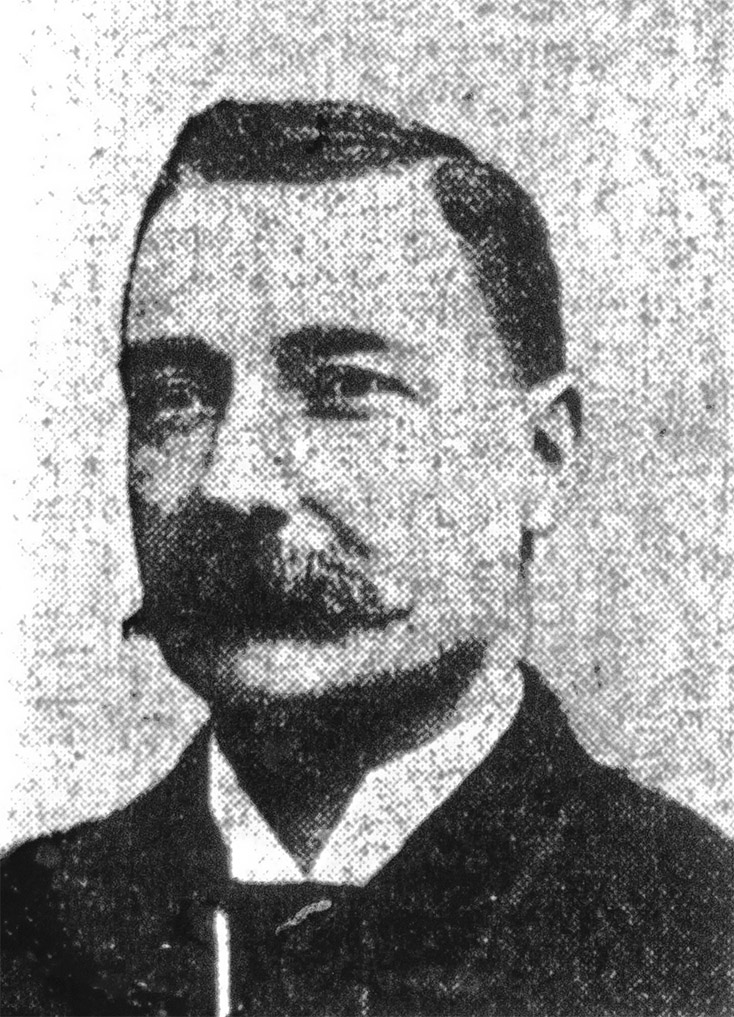
Col. James E. Delaney, among the first of Holyoke's Irish mayors, who also served as city clerk, auditor, and as a member of Governor Russell's military staff

With the exception of the earliest Yankee Protestants, Holyoke's political history encompasses an exhaustive list of Irish and Irish-American figures represented in all years of the city's civic operation, even during those times where it has not been the largest voting bloc, in offices too numerous to name in entirety. A handful of key figures in the Irish community however, especially in the 20th century, would grant it broader influence on the discourse of the Commonwealth in Boston's body politic. One early example was Francis X. Quigley, a member of the Holyoke Philo-Celtic Society and a journalist, who served as a member of the Massachusetts House (1908-1911) and of the state Senate (1911-1913), and was appointed by President Woodrow Wilson in 1913 to be appraiser to the Port of Boston.

One of Holyoke's earliest members of the Irish community to see representation in a municipal, state, and federal capacity was Mayor James Delaney. A son of John Delaney, he was born in Lowell during his father's work on that city's canals, came to Holyoke at the age of one, and eventually graduated from Eastman Business College. Delaney would go on to work for the Holyoke Water Power Company and serve on the city's board of assessors for a year. In 1875 he was elected to the common council, from 1877 to 1882 served as city clerk, and was elected mayor twice in 1883 and 1884, serving two terms before being elected again in 1888 for a third. During that same year Delaney served as delegate-at-large to the convention nominating Grover Cleveland, and elected an alternate for the next Democratic convention. Governor Russell would grant him the honorary title of colonel of the governor's military staff, under Adjutant General of Massachusetts Samuel Dalton. Posthumously the Springfield Republican would describe him as having bipartisan support, and holding a legacy of growth in the city upon leaving office. During his time on the governor's military staff, Delaney attended the inauguration of Pres. Cleveland as well as serve in the state delegation to the World's Columbian Exposition. Attending events such as the inauguration of Russell's successor Frederic T. Greenhalge and events such as charity balls in Boston, spread the influence of the then-still 20 year old city during its greatest period of industrial growth.

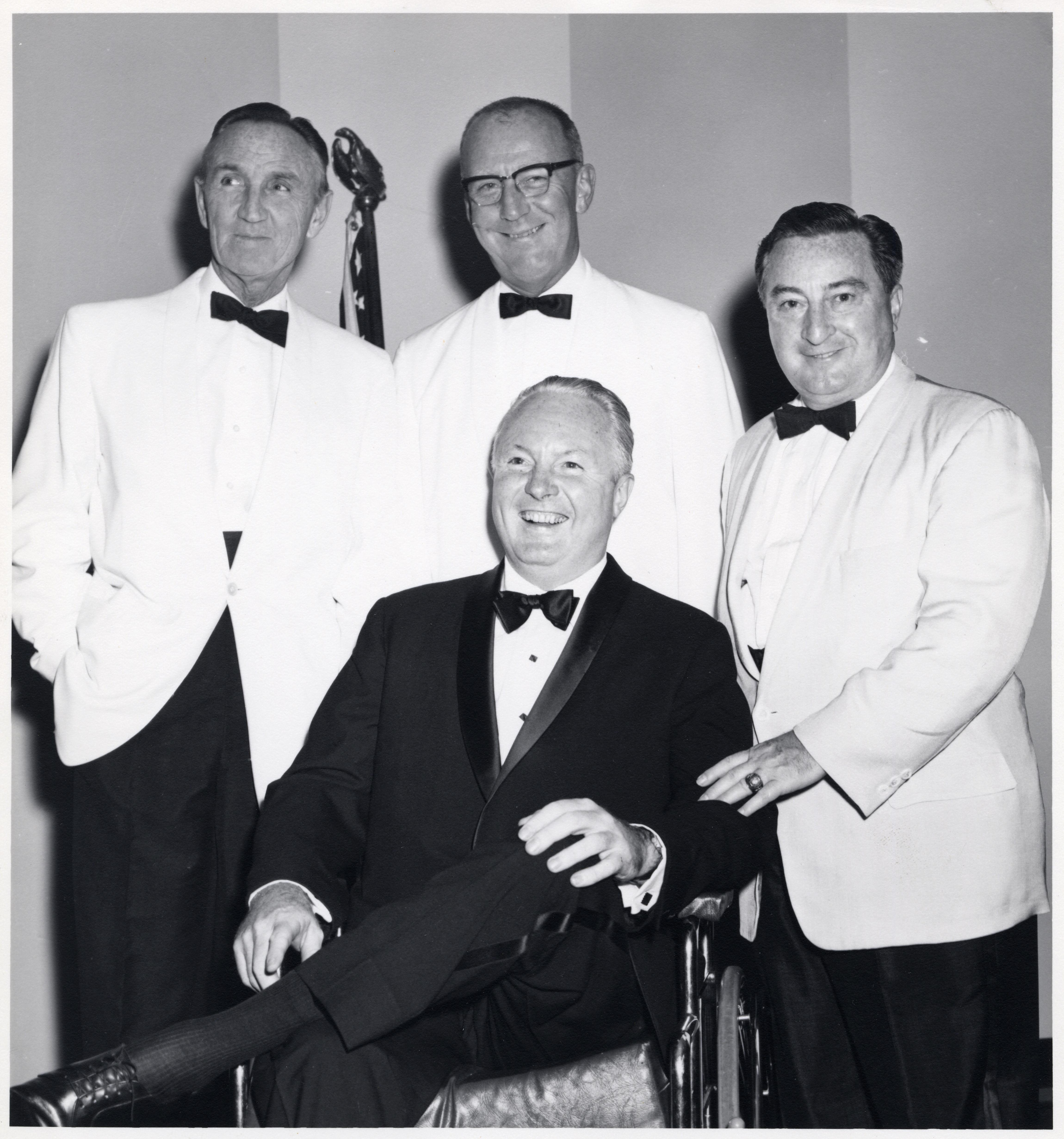
Maurice Donahue (center), stands behind Boston's Mayor Collins (front), c. 1960–1968

In the latter half of the 20th century, Maurice A. Donahue was a Holyoke figure who loomed large in Massachusetts politics. First elected as part of the Commonwealth's first Democratic Party majority in the Massachusetts House of Representatives in 1948, Donahue would go on join the State Senate in 1950, and by 1958 had become the Senate Majority Leader. In this position he lobbied for a number of interests in Western Massachusetts, including for the restoration of the old Mount Holyoke Prospect Summit House at J. A. Skinner State Park and its incline railroad. Though the latter is lost to history, the former would be restored in Donahue's lifetime. By 1964 Donahue had risen to the rank of President of the Massachusetts Senate, a position he held until 1971, longer than any Democratic politician in that post before him. Though a prominent figure in state politics, in a 1976 interview for the John F. Kennedy Library, Donahue would describe John Kennedy's electoral campaigns as lacking the same connections in Holyoke–Chicopee–Springfield as he and his staff had, noting a common respect between the region and Boston but less "down-the-line Democrat" territories than rural towns where Kennedy was able to build a substantial ground staff. Donahue's political career would end in 1971 after failing to garner the post of Democratic nominee for governor in the previous year. Choosing not to seek re-election to the senate, he would be appointed as a professor of political science at the University of Massachusetts and became the first director of the Institute for Governmental Services, a publicly funded consultancy and think-tank which would later bear his name, the UMass Donahue Institute.

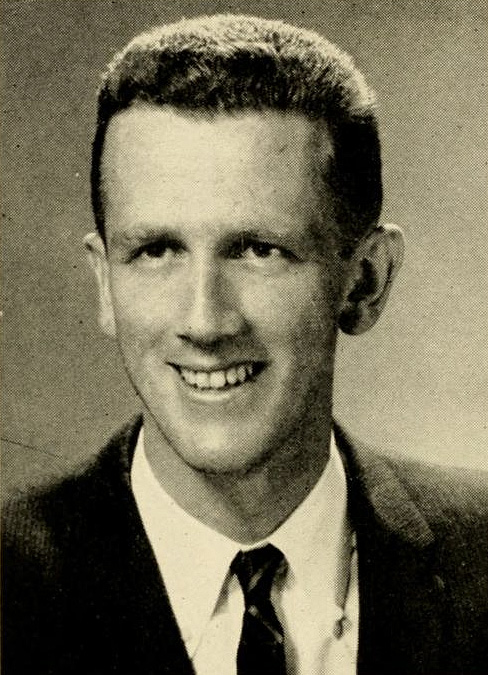
David M. Bartley, c. 1963, as a member of the Massachusetts House of Representatives

Another influential resident of Holyoke in Beacon Hill politics was David M. Bartley, son of a Holyoke police chief James Bartley, who followed a similar career to Donahue's in the General Court, though in the Massachusetts House rather than the Senate. In describing the difference between the two in a 1969 interview with the Boston Herald, Bartley noted their views had "a shade of difference ... After all Donahue grew up through the depression which I did not. And this has given him a certain different Democratic emphasis". Taking the post as Speaker that same year, Bartley was the youngest to assume the second-most powerful political position in Massachusetts in 200 years. As Speaker, Bartley lobbied for what became known as the Bartley-Fox Law, a nationally-studied law which, in 1974, imposed a 1-year mandatory minimum sentence on anyone possessing an illegal firearm; the law has since received mixed appraisal in its efficacy in curbing violent crime. In contrast, Bartley received overwhelming praise for his work in sponsoring, with education committee chairman Michael Daly, what was known as the "Bartley-Daly Law". A culmination of efforts by the Coalition for Special Education, now known as the Federation for Children with Special Needs, the 1971 law removed the legal terms "mentally retarded" or "emotionally disturbed" and placed them under the broader label, "school age children with special needs." The law would also remove IQ test qualifications, and created a legal mechanism by which parents could appeal student placement, as well as incentivized public schools to accommodate such special needs students by mandating public coverage of their tuitions if they were enrolled in private schools. The bill, and programs created by Massachusetts school districts in response, would be the subject of extensive study, influencing special education programs across the United States as the first law providing state funds in the pursuit of "maximum feasible potential" of disabled persons in public education. In the wake of a crisis, wherein an estimated 40,000 to 60,000 students were not receiving education in a language they understood, Bartley and Daly also passed the nation's first bilingual state education law, mandating transitional bilingual programs in districts with 20 or more students of inadequate English proficiency, and temporarily waiving certain teacher certification requirements to encourage more with necessary Spanish, Italian, and Portuguese skills to enter the workforce. Bartley would leave the legislature in 1975 when he was appointed president of his alma mater Holyoke Community College, a post he retained until 2004.

== Events ==
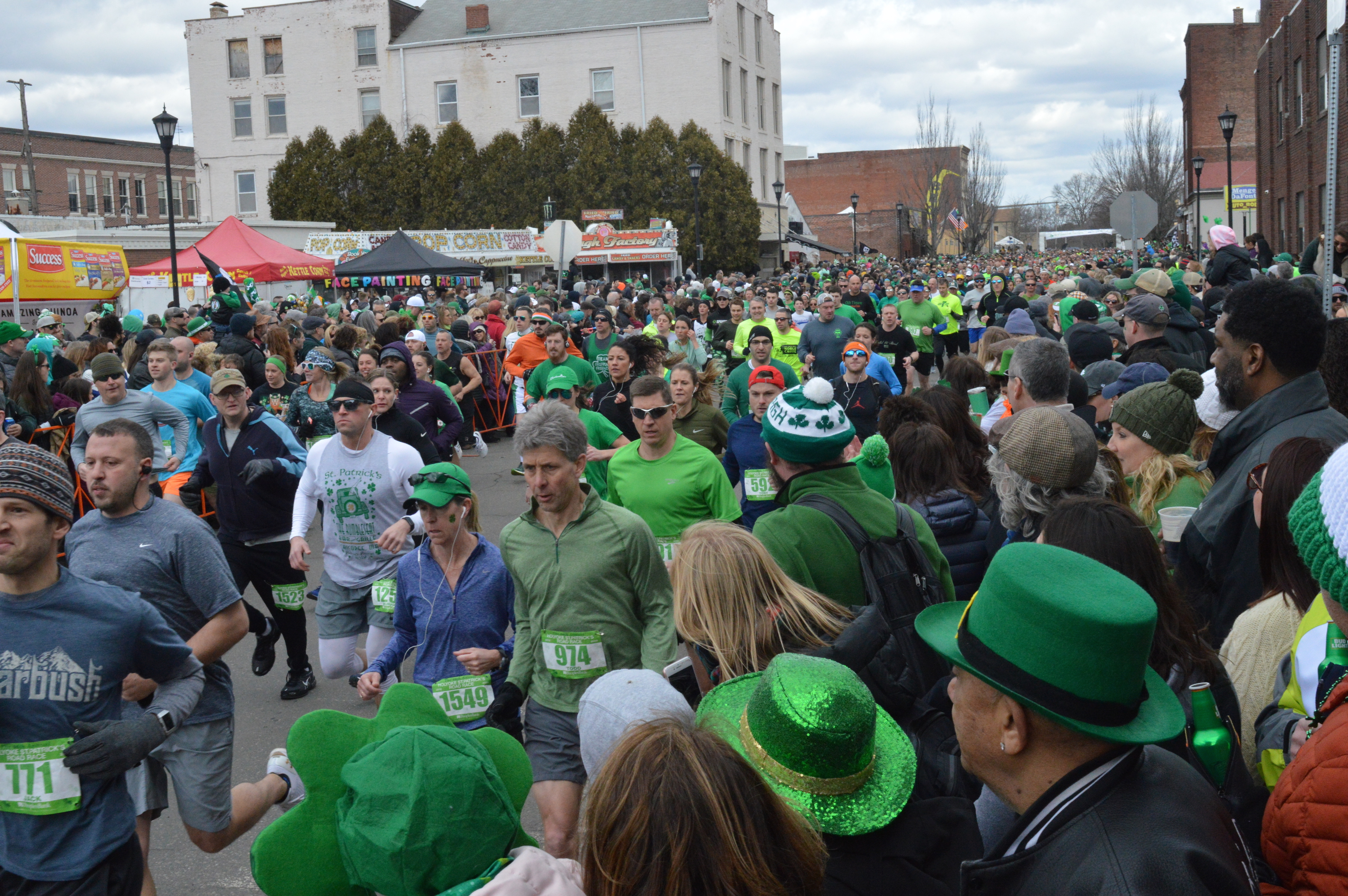
Runners cross the starting line during the 44th annual St. Patrick's Road Race, 2019

Many of Holyoke's Irish cultural events center around the Holyoke St Patrick's Day Parade; leading up to it there are several events, including the Grand Colleen Pageant, typically held the first Saturday in January, of which five young women are selected who go on to the Grand Colleen Ball, at which one is crowned as the parade's Grand Colleen based on presentation and questions related to their Irish heritage.

Other events include the Grand Marshal Reception, held the second Friday of January, a reception at The Student Prince in Springfield with participants of the parade such as the Mummers bands and Holyoke Caledonian Pipe Band, and two road runs. Since 2014, every September the Parade Committee has held the Halfway 5K Run, marking the six months before the next parade, and the better-known 10k, the Holyoke St. Patrick's Day Road Race. Hosted annually the day before the parade since 1975, it has been called by Olympian John Treacy "a miniature Boston", had a record 6,800 contestants complete the course in 2014, and was placed among the best St. Patrick's runs in the nation by Runner's World in 2019.

== Institutions ==
Emblem of the Holyoke St. Patrick's Day Parade Committee, which has held its namesake event annually since 1952

In addition to the role played by labor unions, soon after the arrival of Holyoke's Irish workers many of the city's earliest immigrants would organize cultural institutions. By 1865 it was reported that a Circle of the Fenian Brotherhood had been established. Among the early institutions of the Irish were local courts of the Massachusetts Catholic Order of Foresters. According to the Irish Ancestral Research Association, the first of four was organized in 1887, however newspapers from the time reference such groups in Holyoke as early as 1880, a year after the Massachusetts Order was first organized in Boston. A fraternal benefit society, the Order was predominantly Irish, but also one of the few groups which, in its Catholic origins, had members of both Irish and French-Canadian backgrounds, though not without being at odds over the matter of conduct in the English language.

=== Philo-Celtic Society ===
One of the few city institutions to define itself by the use of the Irish language, the Holyoke Philo-Celtic Society was an Irish cultural group organized by Patrick J. Judge in 1895, who sought to make it "the banner society" among those in America studying the language and literature, offering free courses to all Irish men and women. The society would regularly feature dancing and social functions including regular violin playing of jigs and reels, at most it met on Sundays, Mondays and Fridays in its Emmet Hall, a floor above a "High Street Bank", and described itself as being among the only of such societies to have its own hall and regularly meeting three times a week. The platform for its speakers was described as decorated in alternating small American and Irish flags, with a portrait of Irish republican martyr Robert Emmet at its center.

Though serving its Irish community, the society also sought to promote interest in Irish culture and language to the general public and was known to have published at least one small book described as "Irish in design as well as partly so in language". Indeed by 1898 the Irish American in New York printed remarks made during a meeting of a Providence counterpart which compared New York and Holyoke's societies as comparably outstanding in the advancement of the study of the Irish language among their peers. Though considerably smaller, the population drew regular coverage from the Irish of New York City, with the New York Irish American lauding that "Holyoke seems to be destined to have the banner Irish Language Society, notwithstanding it has only a population of about 40,000". A similar praise came from New York's Irish World, (Note: Not to be confused with the 1987 established The Irish World) which lauded Holyoke's Philo-Celtics as "probably ahead of any other societies in the United States in having [their] own rooms and in meeting three times a week. They have quite a few good Irish scholars there, and a number of active workers".

In 1898, the Holyoke society became a founding organization of the Gaelic League of America, an American counterpart of Conradh na Gaeilge, with 12 other societies including groups from Boston, New York, and Chicago. The two stated objectives of the League were "the preservation of Irish as the National Language of Ireland, and the extension of its use as a spoken tongue" and "the study and publication of existing Gaelic Literature, and the cultivation of a modern literature in Irish". Though the Gaelic League and its member societies described themselves as "non-political and unsectarian", they were not solely a literary or language movement, but one supporting the Irish Cause abroad in financial assistance, though such societies were rarely patronized by the wealthy. By 1908 the Society had also affiliated itself among the ranks of the Irish Texts Society.

=== Hibernians ===
The Ancient Order of Hibernians Division No. 1 of Holyoke, now known as the Ancient Order of Hibernians of Hampden/Hampshire Counties, James A. Curran Div. 1 and Ladies Auxiliary Div. 2, was first established in February 1872. Much of Holyoke's international outreach to Ireland would be made through the AOH throughout the decades, and the division would host Massachusetts' Hibernian convention in 1904.

Facing financial difficulties and dwindling membership, Holyoke's AOH credits its continued existence to Holyoke contractor James Curran, who began hosting its meetings with the establishment of his "Wherehouse" banquet hall in 1977; the division would be named in his honor in 2010. In addition to its involvement in organizing the Holyoke Saint Patrick's Day Parade Committee, the AOH continues to organize banquets, fundraisers, and Irish cultural events primarily at The Wherehouse Banquet Hall in the downtown. Of the 16 divisions extant in Massachusetts today, it is the only one remaining west of Worcester, outside the Greater Boston area.

=== Brian Boru Club ===
On July 20, 1949, the Brian Boru Club of Holyoke was incorporated as a social club, within the year branching out to sponsor its own basketball team in a local league. One day a couple of business men tossed out the idea of holding a St. Patrick's Parade at a Club meeting, and in the following year the group would work with the Hibernians, fire, and police departments, to organize the first annual Holyoke St. Patrick Day Parade in 1952.

By 1960, the Club had acquired the former Union Club Hall, designed by George P. B. Alderman in 1909, and while keeping the Brian Boru name have retained its original liquor license, appearing as "The Union Club of Holyoke Inc. DBA Brian Boru Club" in temporary license applications for the St. Patrick's Day Parade as recently as 2016.

=== Newspapers and publishers ===
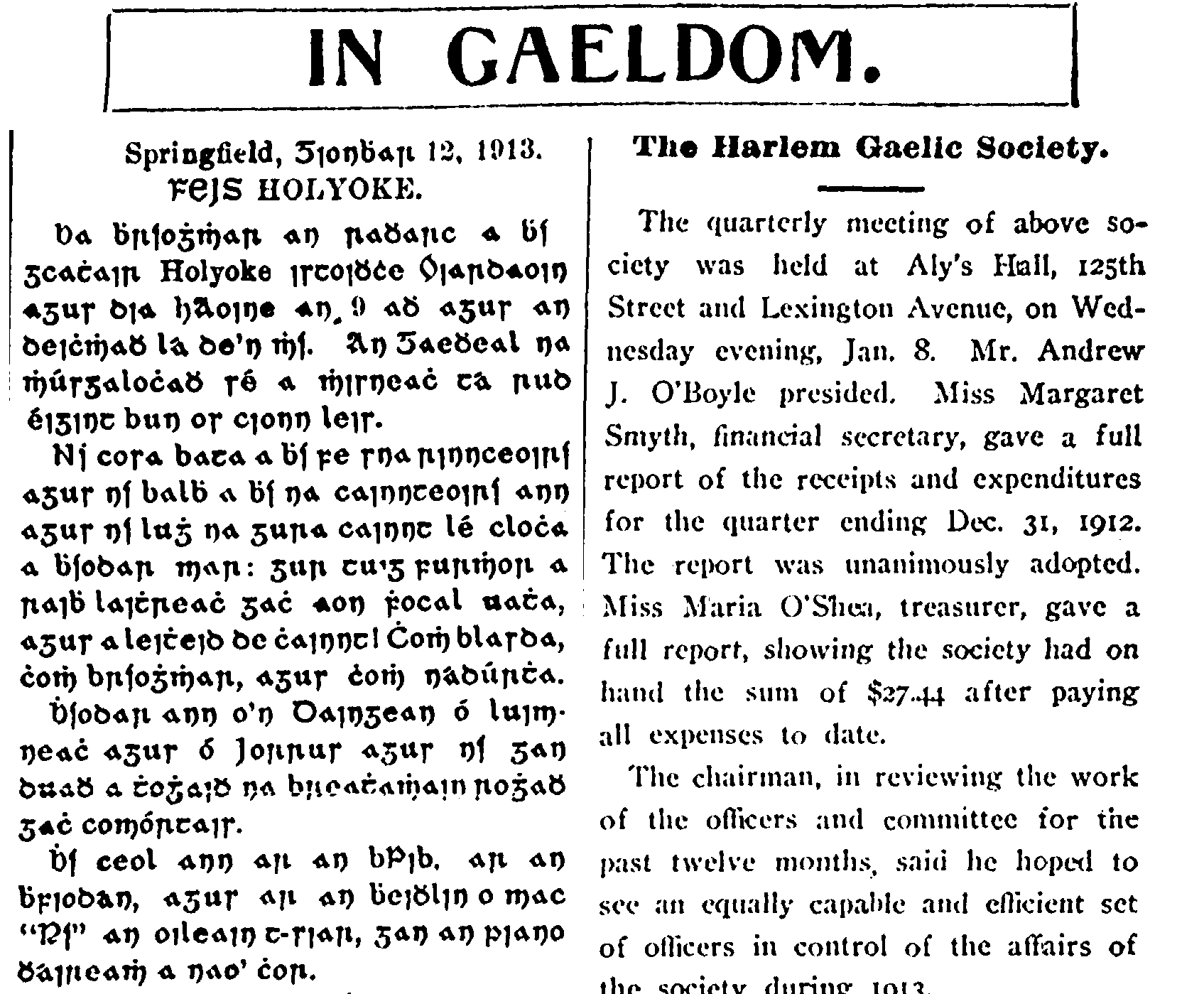
An example of Irish language coverage set in Gaelic script, of a feis in Holyoke; as it appeared in New York City's Irish American newspaper, 1913

Much of the Irish community's affairs were documented in the Holyoke Transcript-Telegram, with its publishers including Mary "Minnie" Dwight (née Ryan), a daughter of Irish immigrants, who was the first female editor of the paper following the death of her husband William G. Dwight, from 1930 until her death in 1957. Ms. Dwight would also be the first woman to receive an honorary degree from the University of Massachusetts. In contrast with other communities, no major circulars were published specifically covering Irish community and much of their stories were those of the daily press, covered in the Transcript until its closure in 1994, as well as the Springfield Union and Springfield Republican of the late 19th century to the present day. However, in New York City's Irish press the community would see extensive coverage in both English and Irish from the 1860s through the 1920s, including such papers as the Irish American, Irish Nation, and Irish World. Even today the city's St. Patrick's Day Parade and announcements related to the Hibernians and other groups are covered by Manhattan's The Irish Echo, as well as Irish America.

== International relations ==
The Holyoke Catholic Benevolent Society has proved by its action that its works of benevolence are not confined to its members; but that it looks above and beyond its local duties, and sees that there is another work of the purest benevolence to be done, and charitably and patriotically it comes forward to assist in its accomplishment.

We hope the example given by this society will be followed by the other Irish societies in the United States and Canada, that are independent of the Brotherhood, and it will show to the world that though Irishmen are not all members of the Fenian Brotherhood, yet their hearts are united in the one grand object, the liberation of Ireland—from Hudson's Bay to Long Island Sound, from the Pacific to the Atlantic, and from the Ganges to the Shannon.

—I remain respectfully yours,
Patrick McGee
Secretary
Vote of thanks given by Holyoke Circle of the Fenian Brotherhood for $100 given to them by the Benevolent Society, declared Sept. 30, 1865, and printed in the New York Irish American and the Boston Pilot

In a speech at the Roger Smith Hotel in 1951 to alumni of Elms College, the Irish consul at Boston, Joseph F. Shields would describe Holyoke as "very well known among the people of Ireland," especially for its support of The Cause. In its history, Holyoke's Irish would maintain relations between the Emerald Isle, and their newfound home in the Commonwealth, and receive numerous figures and officials during British rule and independence thereafter, often raising funds for the cause of Irish republicanism.

Between the raids of 1866 and 1871, General John O'Neill of the Fenian Brotherhood would make a stop in Holyoke on March 13, 1868, as an honored guest of the Brotherhood's unit in that city. With the meeting chaired by builder John Delaney, O'Neill would rally Holyoke's Irish men and women, saying they must be "ready and willing to aid their suffering native land by money and men in its struggle for Irish liberty." In November 1881, Irish republican John Devoy would make a speech before Holyoke's Fenians, predicting the Easter Rising of World War I, stating "Ireland's opportunity will come when England is engaged in a desperate struggle with some great European power."

In 1887 the New York Herald reported that Mayor James J. O'Connor presided over a meeting organized by a local body of the Irish national league hosting Home Rule members of parliament, Sir Thomas Esmonde and Arthur O'Connor during their tour of the Commonwealth. Received by a large party of local politicians including Congressman William Whiting and former Mayor William B. C. Pearsons, the two offered speeches decrying British rule to rousing applause from what was described as one of the largest audiences ever in the Holyoke City Hall up until that time.

In 1898 the Philo-Celtic Society would host Rev. Father Eugene Sheehy of County Limerick for one of their meetings. Sheehy would offer a speech titled the "Language and Music of Our Race" to a packed Emmet Hall, including a delegation from the Springfield Irish Language Society. A series of traditional tunes such as Barney, Come Home and The Meeting of the Waters were played and the meeting concluded with Sheehy reciting the Lord's Prayer in Irish.

On May 17, 1903, the United Irish League's Holyoke chapter would host Mr. Joseph Devlin, Irish journalist and future MP, who, with Mayor Chapin presiding, spent the evening discussing the ramifications of Ireland's Wyndham Land Act. Three years later on November 9, 1906, Mayor Avery would receive MPs Richard Hazleton, and Tom Kettle during their tour of the United States for the Cause. Describing the realities of British rule and progress made toward independence, the two would draw comparison between the independence of the United States and Ireland from the Crown and during the evening some $700, about $20,000 in 2017 US Dollars, was raised.

On November 26, 1911, Michael O'Flanagan and Shane Leslie gave speeches at Holyoke's Empire Theater at the behest of the local Ladies' Division of the Hibernians as envoys of the Gaelic League. Following the Easter Rising of 1916, in December of that year Nellie Gifford was hosted in the city, remarking her pleasant surprise to see the Statue of Liberty represented as a woman, and giving her account of the events of the preceding months, including the Proclamation of the Irish Republic and the possibility of moving further toward Irish independence.

Even after Irish independence, the city would receive members of the Irish Republic. In 1966, Seán Flanagan, minister of health in the Irish government, would be an honored guest among those marching in the St. Patrick's Day Parade, and in recent years the city would twice host Sinn Féin leader Gerry Adams. Adams would march in the parade in 2006 and 2015, giving a press conference at City Hall at his first appearance, as a guest of honor by Congressman Richard Neal, a Holyoke Community College alumnus, who worked with both the IRA and Ulster loyalists and members of Congress to ensure an American role in Irish peace after the Good Friday Agreement. In 2017, Mayor Alex Morse would work with Neal's office to formally establish a sister city relationship between Holyoke and Tralee, of County Kerry, mirroring a sister city agreement with neighboring Springfield.

In addition to its politics, the city played a small role in Irish musical history as well. In the 1970s, polka musician Larry Chesky, began to expand his Polish-American record label Rex Records to include Irish traditional music. Among the dozen or so albums Chesky produced of musicians from the Emerald Isle, included the debut album of Irish accordionist James Keane, and the American debut of The Barleycorn.

== Legacy ==
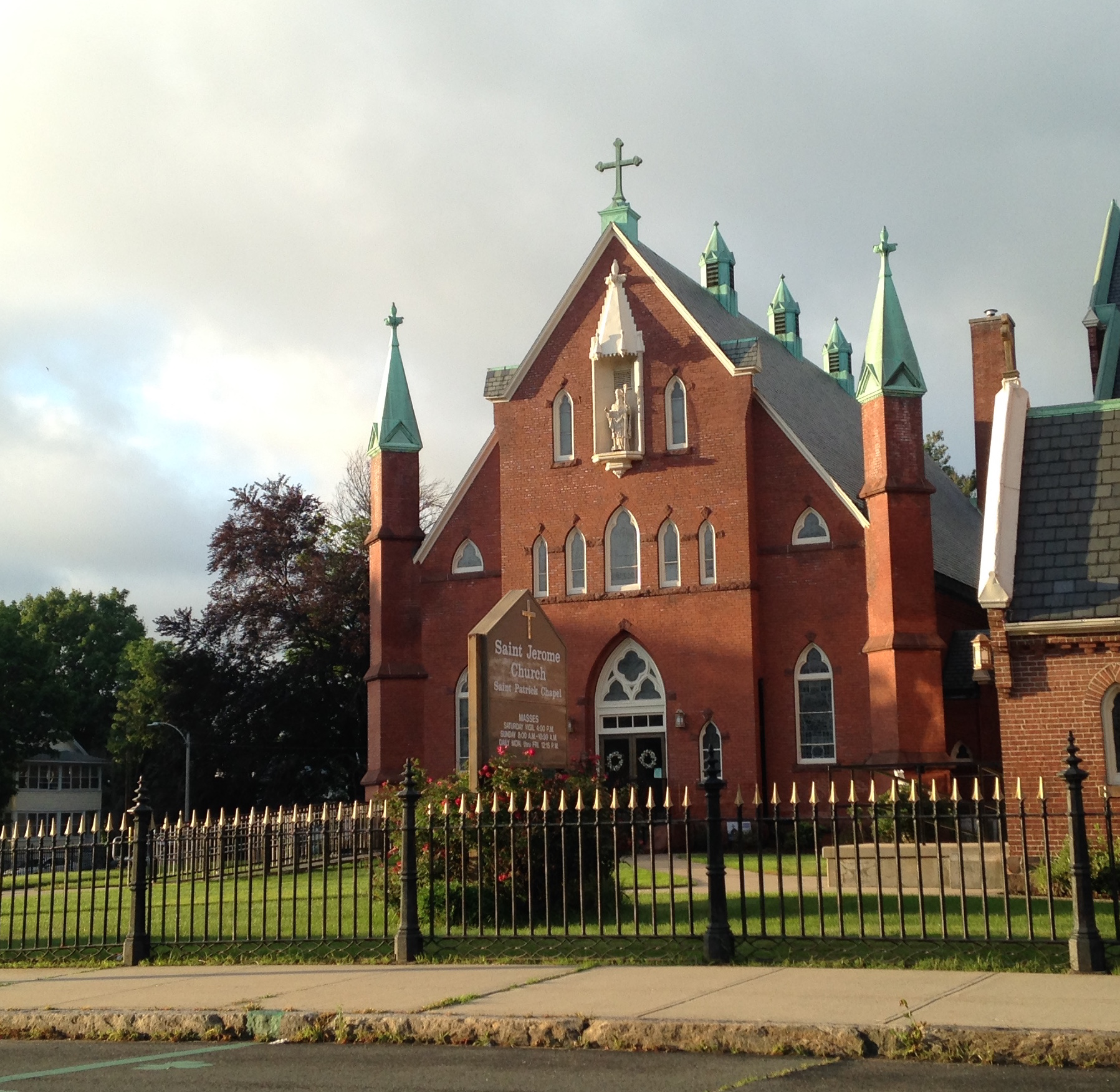
The Saint Patrick Chapel at Saint Jerome Parish

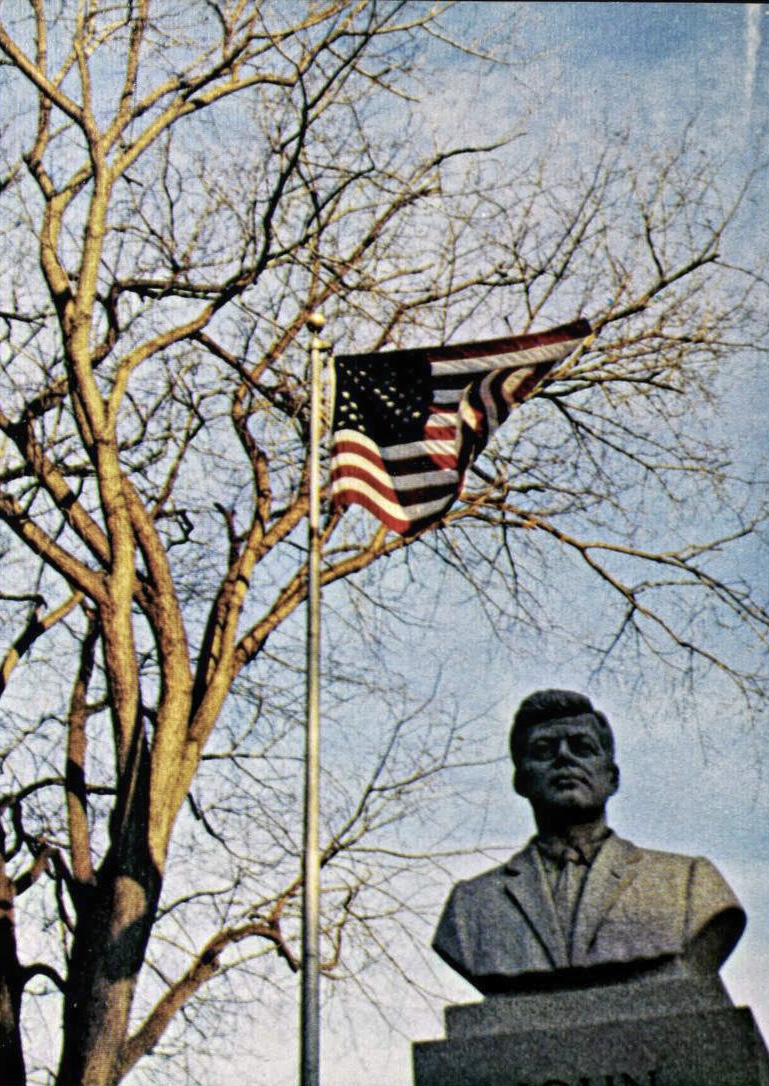
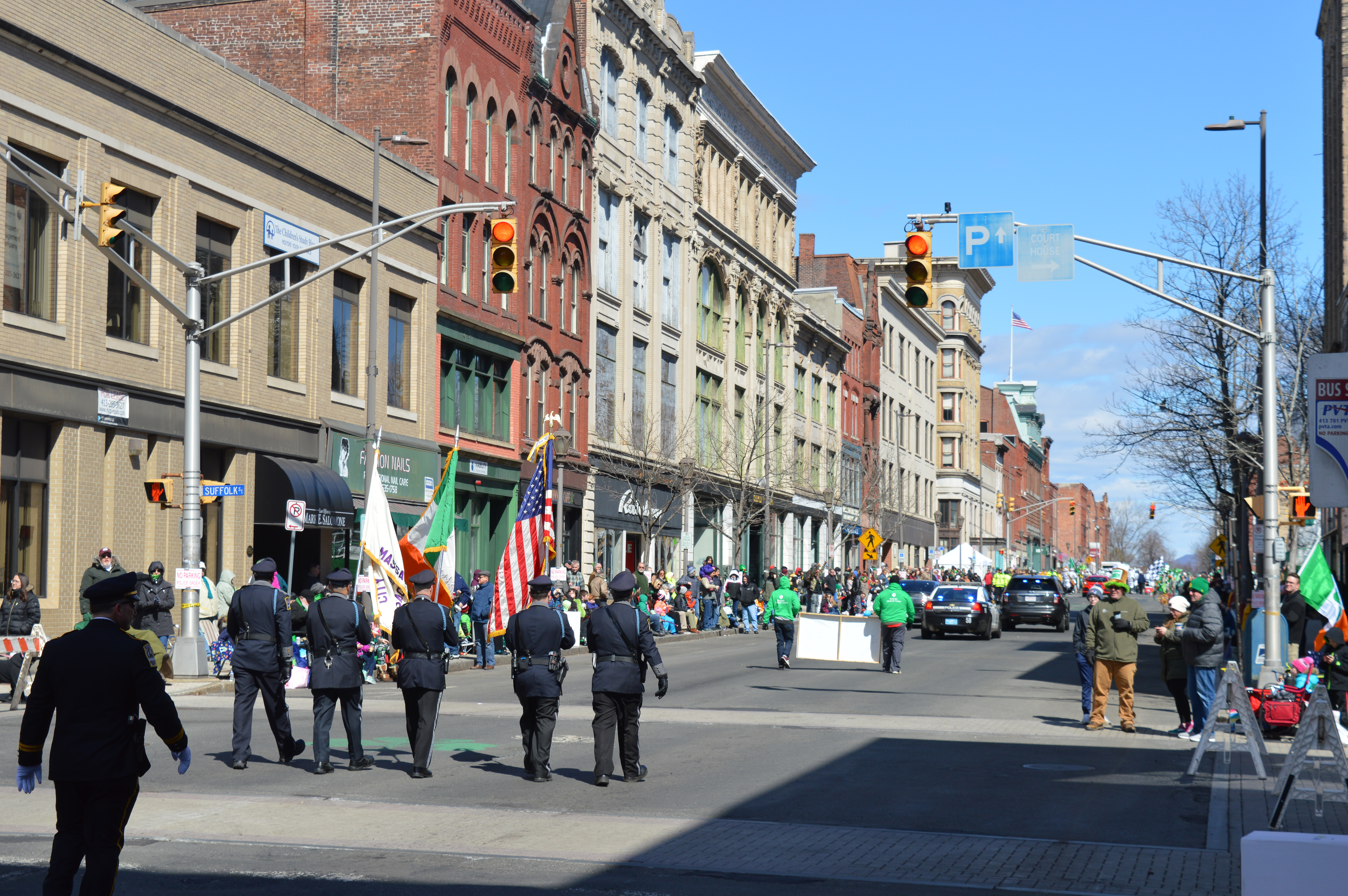
The John F. Kennedy Memorial, at the corner of Suffolk and Appleton in front of Our Lady of the Cross Parish, dedicated in 1967; Holyoke Police officers lead the St. Patrick's Parade with the colors of the Holyoke, Ireland, and the United States

Today Holyoke's Irish leave the legacy of not only the cultural institutions and structures they built but also the cultural diaspora. The Victory March of Notre Dame's Fighting Irish was written and first publicly performed in Holyoke in the winter of 1908 by John and Rev. Michael Shea, both alumni of the college. Michael Shea was the organist for St. Patrick's Cathedral in New York City at that time, and returned to Holyoke to devise the song with his brother who lived there. Shortly after completing their composition, Father Michael would run into his childhood music teacher, Professor William C. Hammond of Mount Holyoke College, who was the music director of the Second Congregational Church. Upon telling Hammond about their aspiring rally song, Hammond suggested Shea perform it in on the church's organ, and in 1908 the fight song for a world renowned Catholic research university was first publicly performed at a Protestant church in Holyoke. At the conclusion of the performance, a group of the church's deacons walked in and "were not a little shocked to see a man wearing a Roman collar energetically thumping away on the keys of their organ. One deacon had a remark to make when the recital was finished. 'Brother,' he said, 'you've got something there.'" The tune has since been described by Sports Illustrated and CBS Sports as the most recognizable fight song in college football today.

"It is nice to be Irish anytime, but it is especially nice on March 17 in Holyoke"
—Sen. John F. Kennedy, receiving inaugural parade award as a Distinguished American of Irish Descent, March 16, 1958

Following a memorial mass at Holy Cross Parish, on May 30, 1967, a year after Ted Kennedy received his brother's namesake award and marched in the St. Patrick's Parade, the Parade Committee dedicated a bust of John F. Kennedy at the corner of Suffolk and Appleton Streets. Presiding over the ceremony were Mayor Daniel F. Dibble, Bishop Christopher Joseph Weldon, Maurice J. Ferriter, and William Rogers, who all played active roles in fundraising for the monument. Cousin Robert P. Fitzgerald would be in attendance, and although the ceremony was unable to be attended by Ted or Bobby Kennedy, the former would make a special phone call to the dedication site from Washington, and the latter would send a telegram noting their late brother's affection for Holyoke and its people. David M. Bartley would serve as the ceremonies key speaker. The memorial remains a part of the ceremonies of the St. Patrick's Day Parade events every year.

In recent decades Irish identity in the Holyoke area has seen renewed interest in language. As recently as 2016 Holyoke Community College maintained a small Irish Studies department offering coursework in Island Literature, Culture, and the study of the Irish diaspora, and today Elms College in Chicopee offers a minor in Irish Studies. The latter was largely created through the efforts of local scholar Thomas Moriarty, a professor emeritus of history. Moriarty, along with Sister Kathleen Keating, then-president of Elms, and Sean Cahillane, would launch the Irish Cultural Center at the college in 1999, and in 2015 it was spun off into a separate entity, the Irish Cultural Center of Western New England based out of West Springfield. Sponsored in part by the Emigrant Support Programme of the Government of Ireland, today the center offers classes in the Irish language as well as tours of Ireland, and hosts events around Irish cuisine, literature, and song.

=== Literature ===
First edition of The Parish and the Hill (1948), by Mary Doyle Curran

Among Holyoke's few literary works was Mary Doyle Curran's The Parish and the Hill. Released in 1948 by Houghton Mifflin, the novel explored the conflicts between first generation Irish immigrants with later generations in the "climb from shanty Irish to lace curtain Irish" by moving from the Irish Parish neighborhood to The Hill. Republished by the City University of New York's Feminist Press in 1986 and 2002, editors lauded the novel as "one of the first to explore Irish life from a woman's point of view". Curran's poetry was featured in the Boston literary journal Ploughshares in 1979, and posthumously her unpublished anthology The Paper City has been featured in MELUS, the journal of the Society for the Study of the Multi-Ethnic Literature of the United States, for early portrayals of the uneasy interethnic relations between early Irish and French immigrant arrivals as well as attitudes toward an indifferent Yankee upper class. Toward the end of her career Curran would head the Irish Studies department at UMass Boston, today the university offers a need-based creative writing scholarship to both graduate and undergraduate students in her name. Today Curran's papers and unpublished manuscripts are in the Special Collections of the W.E.B. DuBois Library at UMass Amherst.

Though not as specifically discussing the social conditions of Irish families in Holyoke, 20th-century American novelist Raymond Kennedy would draw heavily on his own childhood in the city in his works, portraying several in a fictional backdrop of the city, identified by its historical moniker as "Ireland Parish". In 2002, Pulitzer Prize-winning author Madeleine Blais as well, would release her memoir, Uphill Walkers, on growing up in Holyoke, describing personal hardships of her family, and her experience growing up as a church-going Catholic.
