= Holyoke Saint Patrick's Day Parade =

Annual parade in Holyoke, Massachusetts

Holyoke St. Patrick's Day Parade
- Status: Active
- Genre: Parade
- Frequency: Annually
- Location: Holyoke, Massachusetts
- Country: United States of America
- Inaugurated: March 16, 1952
- Attendance: 400,000
- Organizer: Holyoke St. Patrick's Parade Committee
- Website: http://holyokestpatricksparade.com
- March 17, 2024

Holyoke Saint Patrick's Day Parade is hosted every year on the Sunday of the week of Saint Patrick's Day in Massachusetts, US. Each parade usually attracts around 400,000 spectators from all over the United States of America. Past participants have included John F. Kennedy, two Speakers of the House and other notable officials.

== History ==
Then-Massachusetts Senator John F. Kennedy in attendance at the 1958 Holyoke St. Patrick's Parade, receiving an honor as an "outstanding American of Irish parentage" from parade committee President James F. Millane, on the lawn of the Holyoke City Hall. Following Kennedy's assassination, the award was renamed the "John F. Kennedy National Award" in his honor.

Drawing on the Irish heritage of Holyoke, in its earliest days known as "Ireland Parish", the inaugural Saint Patrick's Day Parade was hosted on March 16, 1952, after a group of local businessmen met at the local Brian Boru Club and proposed the idea. Since that time the Holyoke Saint Patrick's Parade Committee which has since grown to more than 100 people and presents multiple awards to distinguished citizens every year.

As with the United States at-large, the parade has been widely participated in by people both of Irish and non-Irish heritage alike, and has come to be a reflection of Holyoke's syncretic culture, an example being local vendors selling such combinations as Café con leche with Irish soda bread, and wide variety of bands participating from all over the country, including but not limited to, the Aqua String Band, the Hawthorne Callaberos, and the Tian Guo Marching Band. Citing concerns about the coronavirus pandemic, in 2020 the parade and several associated events were cancelled for the first time in its 68 year run. It went on hiatus the next year before it resumed in 2022.

== Attendance ==
Parade spectator estimates by year (1952–2017)

| Year | Spectators (est.) |
|---|---|
| 1952 | 25,000 |
| 1960 | 100,000 |
| 1965 | 60,000 |
| 1970 | 100,000 |
| 1975 | 200,000 |
| 1980 | 250,000 |
| 1985 | 175,000 |
| 1991 | 250,000 |
| 2003 | 250,000 |
| 2009 | 350,000 |
| 2011 | 400,000 |
| 2017 | 400,000 |
| 2020-21 | 0 |

Since its inaugural event in 1952, the parade has grown substantially; while the first parade saw around an estimated 25,000 spectators, in recent years the estimated number of spectator's has exceeding 400,000, approximately ten times the population of Holyoke as of the most recent census. The event, considered as much a regional as local venue, attracts many spectators from surrounding states and even Ireland itself in recent years. In 2011 the UMass Donahue Institute estimated the parade brought in $20 million annually to the local economy, through its participants and spectators.

== Honorees ==
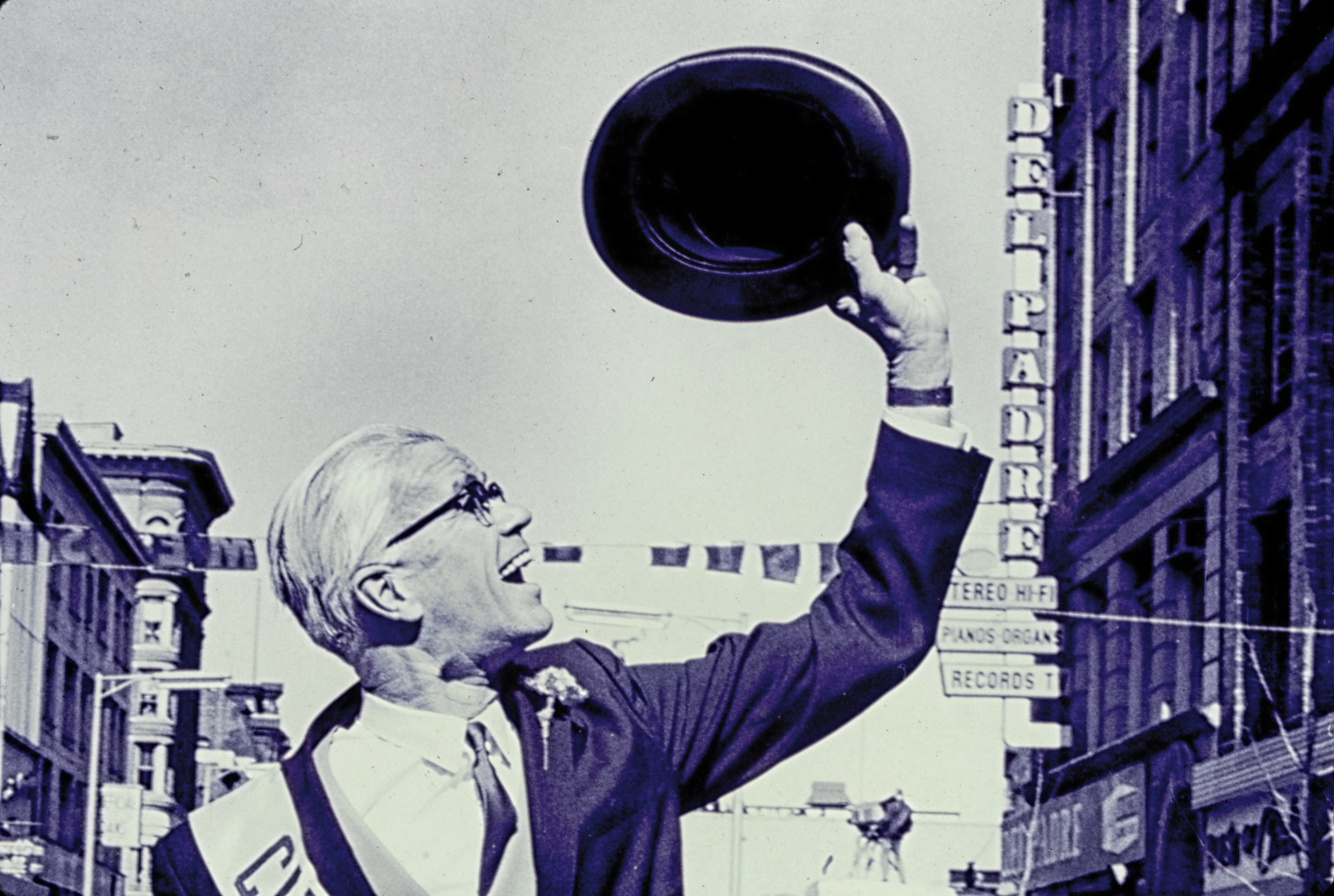
Robert Barrett Jr., president of the Holyoke Water Power Company and a recipient of the parade's Citizenship Award, tips his hat to spectators in the 1969 parade

Each year since its first iteration, the parade has had a parade president and grand marshal; in 1955 the first Colleen was chosen and given her own court and throne. Over the years a number of other awards have been created, including the Thomas Rohan Award (1957), named for the first grand marshall, for citizens contributing outstanding work to the parade; the John F. Kennedy Award (1958), named for its inaugural recipient, has been given to an "Outstanding American of Irish Descent" each year since that time and has included nationally known singers, actors, athletes, writers, an astronaut, mayors of Boston, several governors, senators, and Speakers of the House. Additional awards include the Citizenship Award (1966) honoring those of non-Irish descent who have made substantial contributions to the parade, the George E. O’Connell Award (1963) to members of the parade committee who have made longstanding efforts to fundraising, the Daniel J. Gallivan Award (1972) for others who have made significant contributions to the parade who do not reside in Holyoke, and the Ambassador Award (1992) to those who promote ties between the United States and Ireland.

Parade Honorees (1952–Present)

| Year | Grand Colleen | Grand Marshal | John F. Kennedy Award Recipient |
|---|---|---|---|
| 1952 | | Tom Rohan | |
| 1953 | | John S. Begley | |
| 1954 | | Daniel J. O'Connell | |
| 1955 | Kathleen O'Sullivan | Emmett C. Cauley | |
| 1956 | Mary Monaghan | Dr. Elmer J. Harrington | |
| 1957 | Maureen Murphy | William P. Sullivan | |
| 1958 | Geraldine Lawler | William R. Peck | John F. Kennedy |
| 1959 | Ann Burke | William E. Nolen | Jeremiah J. Minnehan |
| 1960 | Sheila McCormick | John J. Driscoll | John F. Collins |
| 1961 | Susan Hobert | Michael H. Moran | Christopher Joseph Weldon |
| 1962 | Francine Dillon | Maurice A. Donahue | Bob Considine |
| 1963 | Joan Riley | Eugene P. O'Neill | William Gargan |
| 1964 | Kathleen Kennedy | Jeremiah J. Lawler | James B. Donovan |
| 1965 | Mary Ellen McGinty | Joseph F. Lynch | James J. Shea |
| 1966 | Margaret Shevlin | Joseph J. Kelly | Edward M Kennedy |
| 1967 | Janet Kelly Desrosiers | Thomas W. Padden | Tommy Loughran |
| 1968 | Una Petcen | William J. Dean | Larry O'Brien |
| 1969 | Deborah Kennedy | James F. Millane | Richard Cushing |
| 1970 | Kathleen Welch | Frank R. King | John N. Dempsey |
| 1971 | Ann Marie O'Brien | William G. Rogers | Pat O'Brien |
| 1972 | Nancy Rainville | David M. Bartley | Timothy J. Dacey Jr. |
| 1973 | Sherry Lee McFadden | Timothy J. Sullivan | John W. McCormack |
| 1974 | Mary Ann Croke | George E. Frost | Jim Bishop |
| 1975 | Martha Marie Donohue | William W. Mahoney | Thomas P. Salmon |
| 1976 | Ann Marie Abel | Richard J. Murphy | Edward Bennett Williams |
| 1977 | Patricia Marie Dean | Francis J. Baker | Jimmy Breslin |
| 1978 | Katherine M. Quirk | Edward F. Sheehy | Tip O'Neill |
| 1979 | Corrine Baker | John F. Moriarty | Dan Devine |
| 1980 | Patricia Ann Long | James J. Shea | Art Rooney |
| 1981 | Ann Dean | Edward "Sarge" Nugent | William A. Nolen |
| 1982 | Patricia O'Connor | Maurice B. Martin | Maureen O'Hara |
| 1983 | Karen Barrett | John T. Hickey | Joseph F. Maguire |
| 1984 | Alyssa Fitzpatrick | James "Barry" Farrell | Edward Boland |
| 1985 | Maureen Simonds | James E. O'Leary | Frank McGuire |
| 1986 | Kerry Ann Moriarty | Leo Edward O'Neil | William A. O'Neill |
| 1987 | Theresa Clark | Anne Hearn McHugh | Dennis Day |
| 1988 | Ruth Ellen Allyn | Bernard M. Lavelle | Thomas Flatley |
| 1989 | Anne Marie O'Connell | Thomas J. Donahue | Neil Sheehan |
| 1990 | Mary Deleva | James K. Kelly | Leo Edward O'Neil |
| 1991 | Christine Brill | Patrick B. Bresnahan | Carmel Quinn |
| 1992 | Candice McKenzie | Edward B. "Pop" Coughlin | Tom Clancy |
| 1993 | Heather Bresnahan | Maurice J. Ferriter | Mary Rose McGeady |
| 1994 | Kara Elizabeth Shanahan | Robert J. Rohan | Raymond Flynn |
| 1995 | Marikate Moriarty | Charles W. "Bill" Dinn | Eoin McKiernan |
| 1996 | Shaena A. Smalley | Francis M. Baker | Robert Stack |
| 1997 | Mary Kate Cartier | John E. McHugh | John J. Sweeney |
| 1998 | Kimberly Lyn Willis | Daniel E. Tierney | Richard I. Neal |
| 1999 | Abby Gordon Woods | Francis M. Kane | Patti Ann, Conor, & Steven McDonald |
| 2000 | Abbey Louise McLaughlin | Francis X. Sullivan | Richard E. Neal |
| 2001 | Elizabeth Ann Cartier | Joseph F. McGuire | John Shea |
| 2002 | Kathleen C. Joyce | James A. Curran | Daniel Coughlin |
| 2003 | Mary Kate Moynihan | Peter F. Brady | William J. Flynn |
| 2004 | Sheila Maureen Murphy | Joseph V. Gosselin Jr. | Catherine Coleman |
| 2005 | Carolyn Patricia McLain | Russell J. McNiff Sr. | Tom O'Brien |
| 2006 | Katy Beth Brunelle | Frederick L. Sullivan | Tom Ridge |
| 2007 | Kim Erin Elliott | Alan F. Cathro | Dan Shaughnessy |
| 2008 | Ashley M. Reidy | Ann M. Gibbons | Fran Healy |
| 2009 | Ashley R. Tucker | Christine Padden Zajac | Joseph Loughrey |
| 2010 | Rosalyn C. Chesky | Joseph M. McGiverin | Dan Rooney |
| 2011 | Meaghan Leahy | Gerald D. Healy | David McCullough |
| 2012 | Brianna M. Fitz | Barry J. Farrell | Kevin O’Hara |
| 2013 | Brieanna M. Gresh | Brian Q. Corridan | Doris Kearns Goodwin |
| 2014 | Sheila S. Fallon | Roger P. Donoghue | Dick and Rick Hoyt |
| 2015 | Allyson Craven | Raymond H. Feyre | John M. Maguire |
| 2016 | Meghan N. Ryan | Patricia C. Devine | Micky Ward |
| 2017 | Margaret Walsh | Jane Morrissey | Ann Dowd |
| 2018 | Madelynne Kelleher | David “Archie” Donoghue | Archie Roberts |
| 2019 | Lauren Dulude | Roger Reidy Jr. | T. J. Jagodowski |
| 2020 | Moira McDermott | John “Jay” Driscoll | David Glidden |
| 2021 | | | |
| 2022 | Moira McDermott | John “Jay” Driscoll | David Glidden |

== Media coverage ==
The parade also enjoys an audience beyond its participants, with more than 1.2 million viewers watching over the channel and online streams of local PBS affiliate WGBY, which broadcast it every year from 2001 through 2018. WWLP resumed as the broadcaster of the parade in 2019 through its CW channel, and also included a livestream. Other local media outlets including WGGB-TV and the Springfield Republican also cover the event.

== Gallery ==
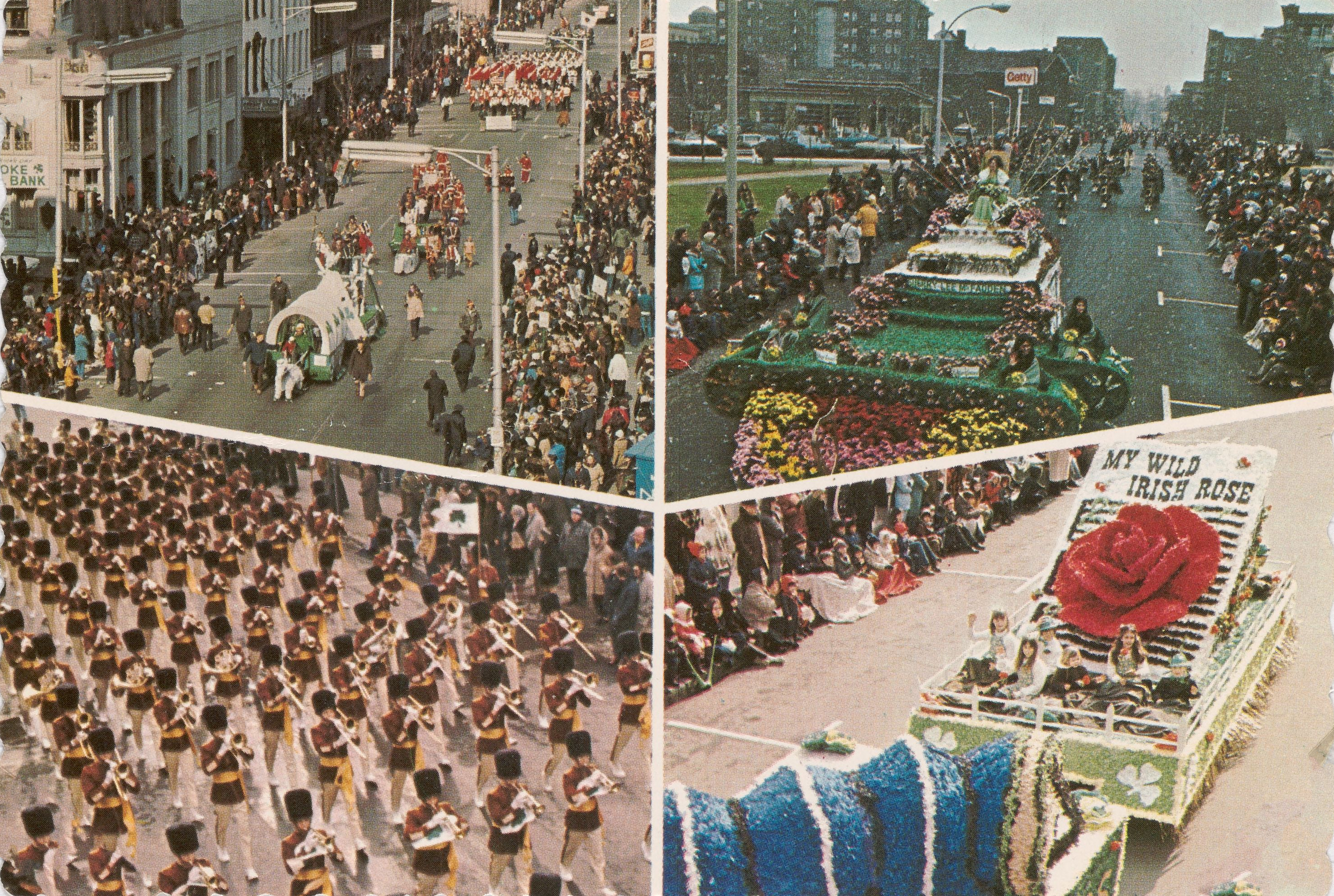
Various scenes of the Parade, 1973

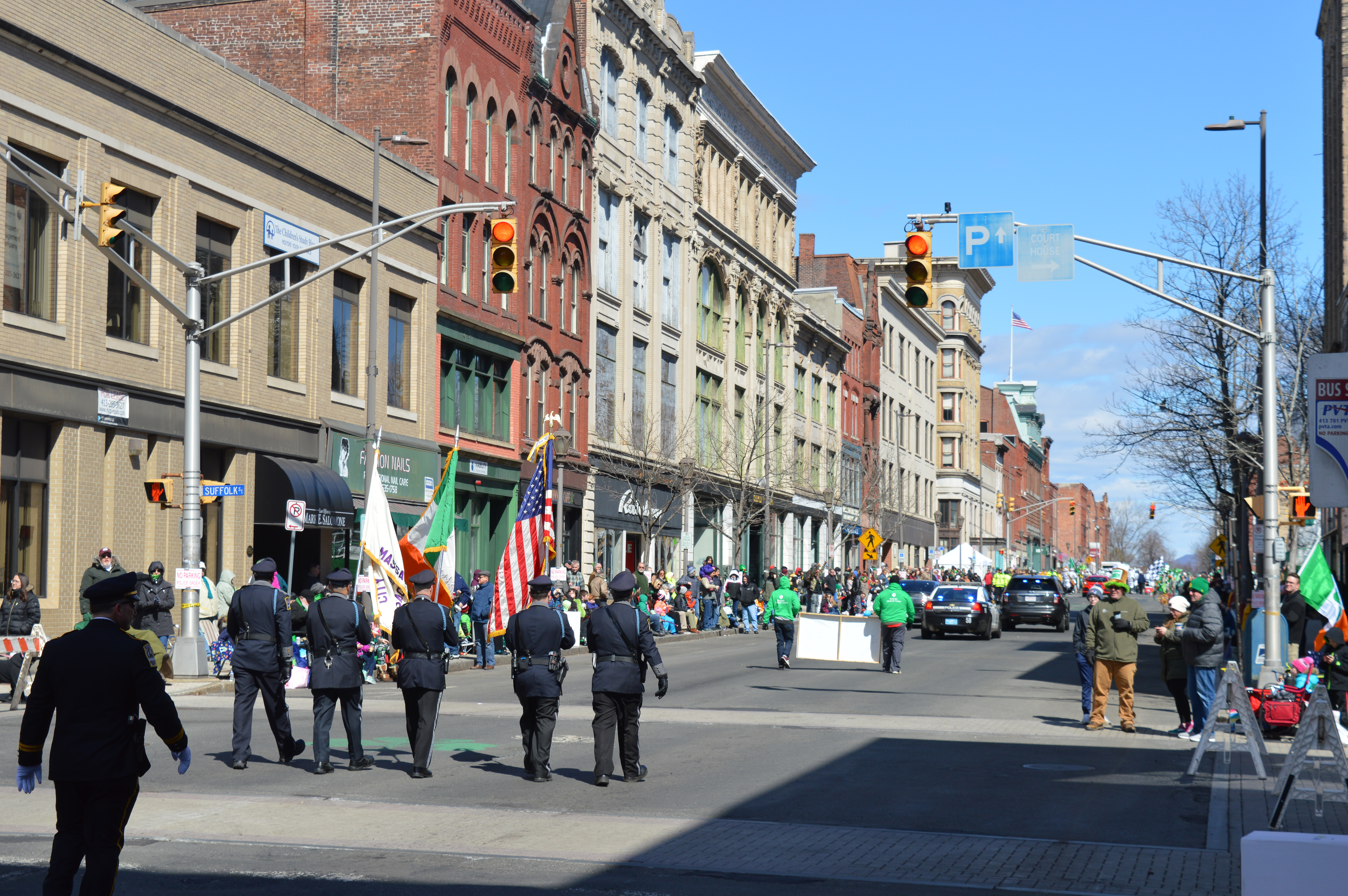
Flag carrying officers of the Holyoke Police Dept. leading the Saint Patrick's Parade, 2019

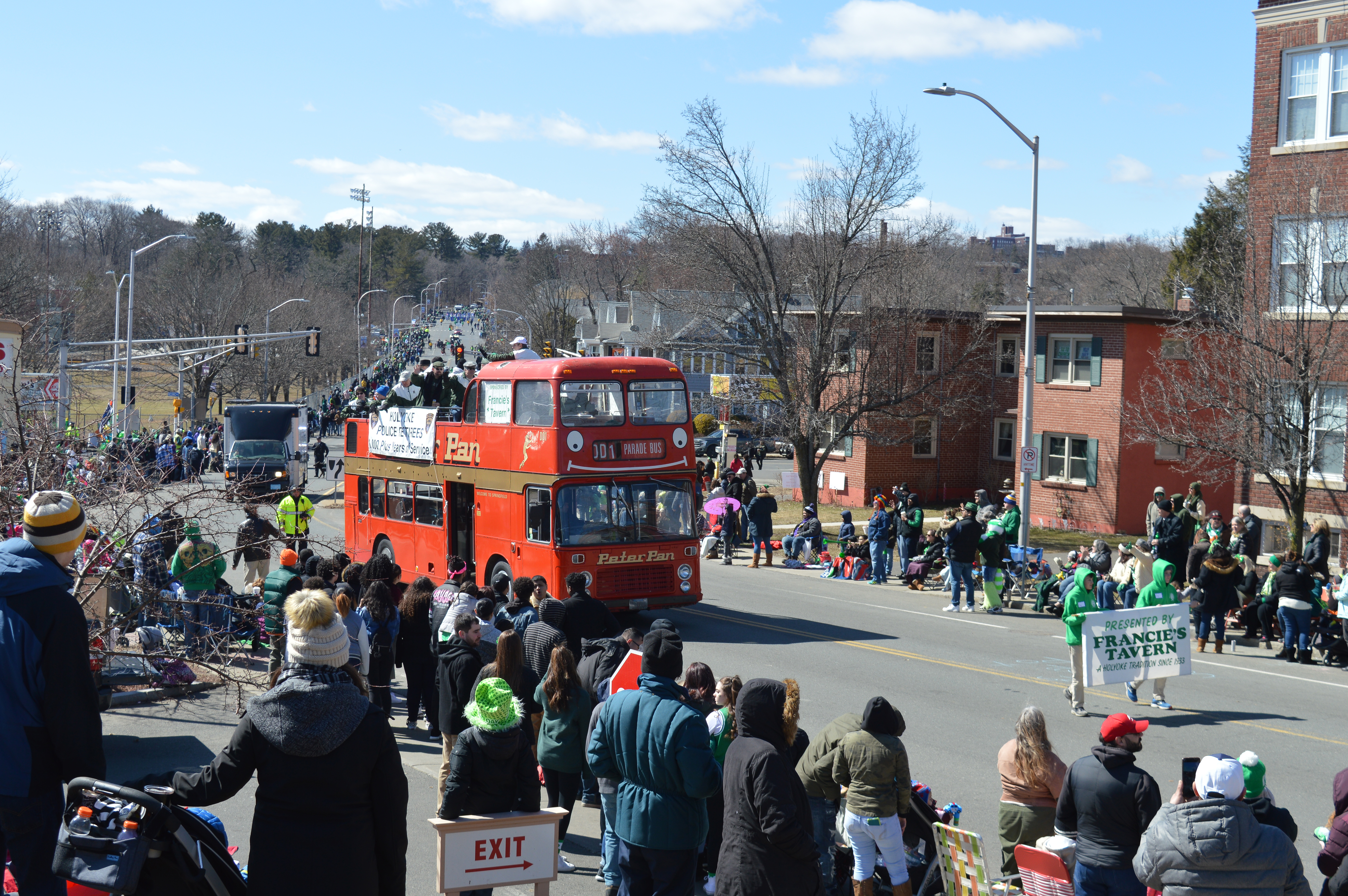
Parade floats, including the Peter Pan parade bus, move toward downtown on Beech Street

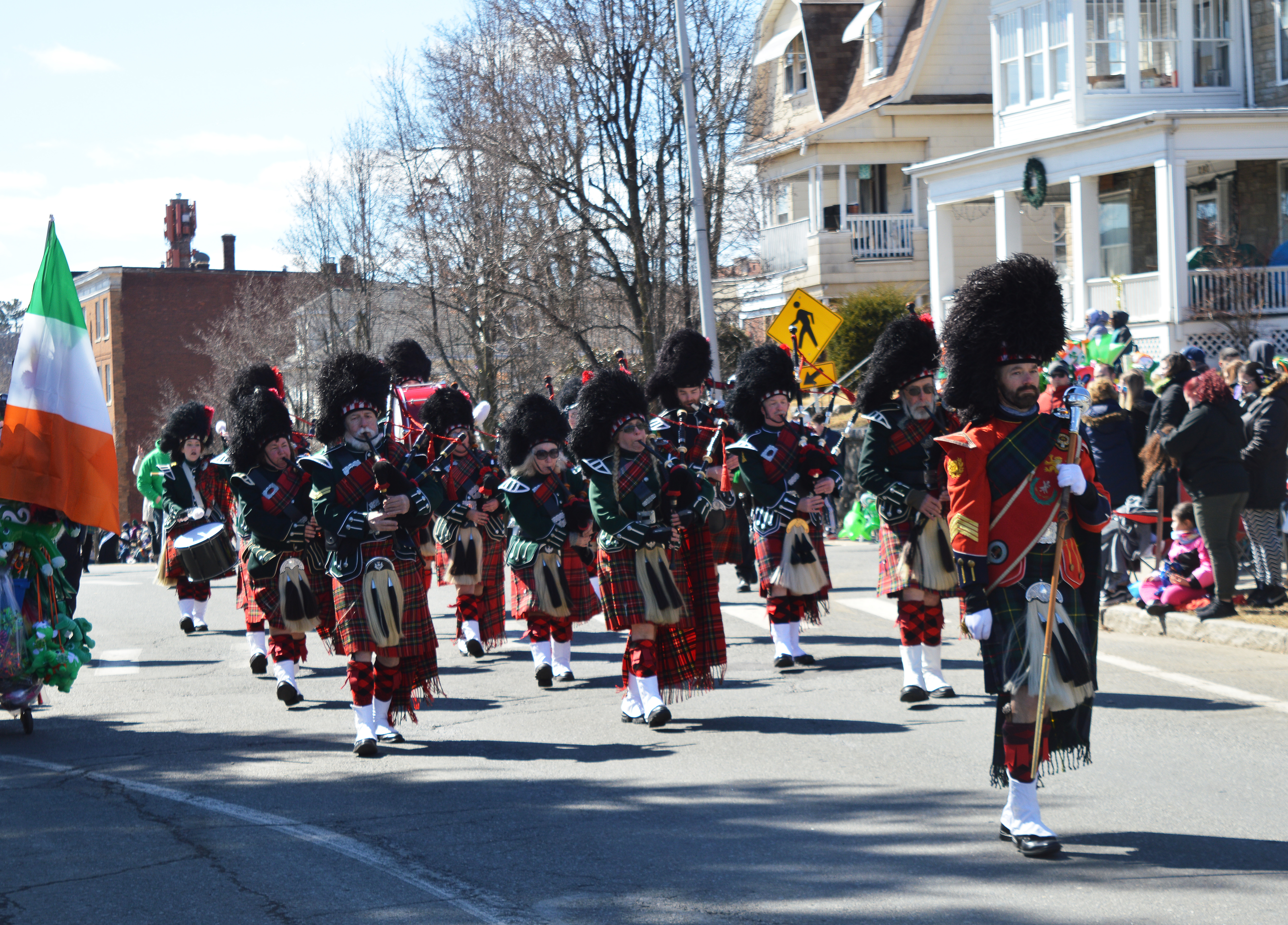
The Caledonian Pipe Band performing in the parade, preceding the Grand Marshall's party

== See also ==
- History of the Irish in Holyoke
- Holyoke Caledonian Pipe Band, regular feature in the parade since the first and oldest continuously operating pipe band in North America
- Saint Patrick's Day
