= T. J. Jagodowski =

American actor

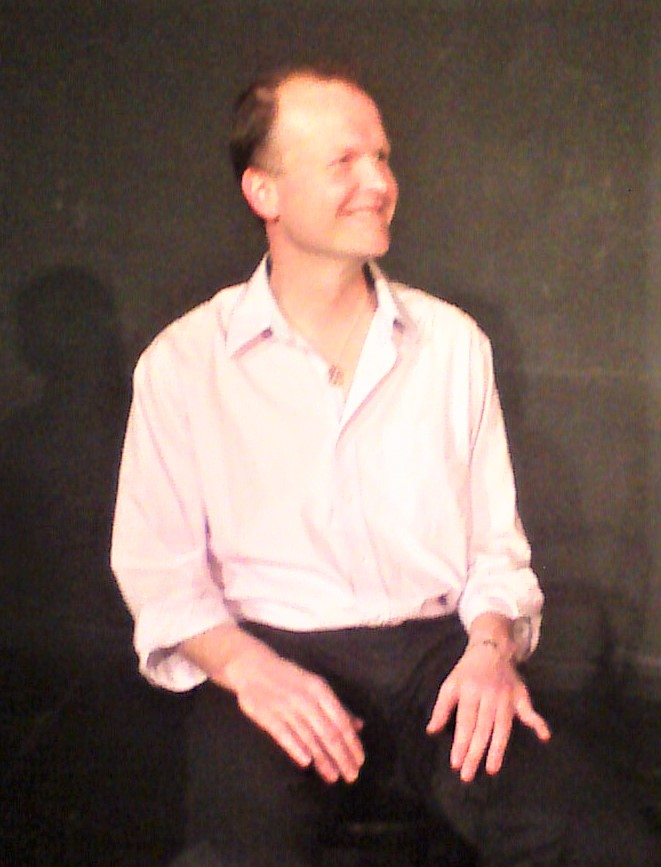
- on stage after a show at iO Chicago (April 2013)
- Born: Thomas James Jagodowski; September 2, 1971 (age 55); Holyoke, Massachusetts, U.S.
- Education: Syracuse University
- Known for: "Two Guys" ad campaign for Sonic

Thomas James Jagodowski (born September 2, 1971) is an American comedian, actor, and improvisational performer who resides in Chicago. He has been a member of The Second City as well as a performer and teacher at iO Theater, formerly known as "Improv Olympic". He has appeared in movies such as Stranger Than Fiction, The Ice Harvest, No Sleep Till Madison, Get Hard and the television show, Prison Break. He is most recognizable from the long-running series of improvised Sonic Drive-In commercials featuring him and Peter Grosz until 2020.

== Life and career ==
Jagodowski was born in Holyoke, Massachusetts. He attended Blessed Sacrament school and graduated as salutatorian of Holyoke Catholic High School in 1988.

While he was in college at Syracuse University, a vending machine fell on his right leg, breaking multiple bones. Plates and screws were installed in his leg to allow it to heal, but a rampant staph infection took hold. Doctors told him he was one week away from losing the leg to gangrene.

Jagodowski later discussed this crisis during his performance at "The Armando Diaz Theatrical Experience and Hootenanny", a weekly show at iO that uses one performer's/guest monologist's stories as inspiration for improvised scenes. He purportedly said he generally hates the use of such stories in improv.

Jagodowski began improvising in the early 90s. He started out on several Harold teams at iO Chicago. In 1998, he was cast in the Mainstage cast of The Second City, where he appeared in revues on both Mainstage and e.t.c. stages alongside Kevin Dorff, Susan Messing, Stephnie Weir, and many others. Since 2002, he has been performing at iO with David Pasquesi in the long-running improv show "T. J. and Dave."

The 2009 South by Southwest Film festival included the documentary "Trust Us, This is All Made Up", directed by Alex Karpovsky, which chronicles a "T. J. and Dave" performance.

The Chicago Improv Festival called Jagodowski "The best improviser in Chicago". New City Chicago said, "If Miles Davis had pursued comedy instead of music, the results might have looked something like this."

Jagodowski performs weekly in Chicago in a variety of improv programs, but most notably in "T. J. and Dave" with David Pasquesi, which the Chicago Reader has described as "an hour of subtle character development, verbal facility, and pantomimic agility that anticipates and plays off the audience's reactions." Since 2006, the duo performs this show monthly at The Barrow Street Theatre in New York City, and have been performing the show weekly since 2002 in Chicago.

From 2002 to 2012 and 2014 to 2020, Jagodowski starred as one half of the "Two Guys" for the Sonic Drive-In commercials, alongside fellow improviser Peter Grosz. In 2020, it was reported that Sonic's commercials would be going in a different directions, but that the "Two Guys" series would continue to be part of the chain's advertising in some way. Lori Abou Habib, Sonic's Chief Marketing Officer, said that the commercials are "a huge part of our voice, and they’ll be part of our brand going forward." The two actors also appeared together in the 2006 film Stranger Than Fiction.

Jagodowski was a guest on the NPR program Wait Wait... Don't Tell Me! for the weekend of November 2–3, 2013.

In 2019, the Holyoke St. Patrick's Day Parade Committee honored Jagodowski with the John Fitzgerald Kennedy National Award. The John F. Kennedy Award is presented annually to an American of Irish descent who has distinguished themselves in their chosen field. Past winners included Jimmy Breslin, Doris Kearns Goodwin, Tom Clancy, David McCullough, Leo Edward O'Neil, Art Rooney, Dan Devine, Tip O'Neill, Dennis Day, Neil Sheehan, as well as John F. Kennedy and Ted Kennedy.

== Filmography ==
=== Film ===
Year	Film	Role
1999	Serious Business	Improv Nerd
2001	Soul Survivors	ER Doctor
2002	No Sleep 'til Madison	Greg
2002	Streetriffs	Skeets
2005	The Ice Harvest	Officer Tyler
2006	Stranger Than Fiction	IRS Co-Worker #4
2009	Club83	Tj
2010	The Moleman of Belmont Avenue	Paulie
2012	Close Quarters	Patrick
2013	Oz the Great and Powerful	Quadling Mayor
2015	Get Hard	Chris
2015	Open Tables	William Burns
2026	Bulls	Ian

=== Television ===
Year	Show	Role	Notes
2001	What About Joan?	Ben	Episode: "Mr. Roboto"
2006	Prison Break	Pilot	2 episodes
2014	Couch Surferz	Gandulf	Episode: "Gandulf's Rules"
2016–19	Chicago Fire	Rodney Ogle	2 episodes
2016	Easy	Bern	Episode: "The Fucking Study"
2017	Shrink	Yourg	5 episodes
2021	Work in Progress	Death	Episode: "FTP"
2026	The Bear	Bar patron	Episode: "Gary"

=== Commercials ===
Year	Role	Company
2002-2012 and 2014-2020	Himself ("Two Guys")	Sonic Drive-In
?-present	Himself ("Two Guys")	Jiffy Lube
