= Holyoke Caledonian Pipe Band =

American pipe band

- Established: 1910
- Location: Holyoke, Massachusetts
- Grade: 4
- Tartan: Royal Stewart
- Notable honours: Oldest continuously operating pipe band In North America
- Website: www.holyokecaledonians.com

The Holyoke Caledonian Pipe Band is a pipe band based out of Holyoke, Massachusetts. Founded in 1910, it is the oldest pipe band in continuous existence in the United States. A regular feature in the Holyoke Saint Patrick's Day Parade since the first in 1952, the band also performs at Smith College's annual commencement, as well as charity and private events.

The pipe band was first founded by two Scottish immigrants Bob Ramsay and Jim Robbie, soon after arriving in Holyoke, and was initially connected to the Holyoke Caledonian Benefit Club. The Caledonian club, established in 1879, was a benefit society dedicated to granting charity to their fellow Scots "in times of sickness and distress" and for the cultivation of Scottish culture, through the promotion of literature and the arts. The band would hold regular rehearsals on the top floor of their namesake Caledonia Building in downtown Holyoke until 1966.

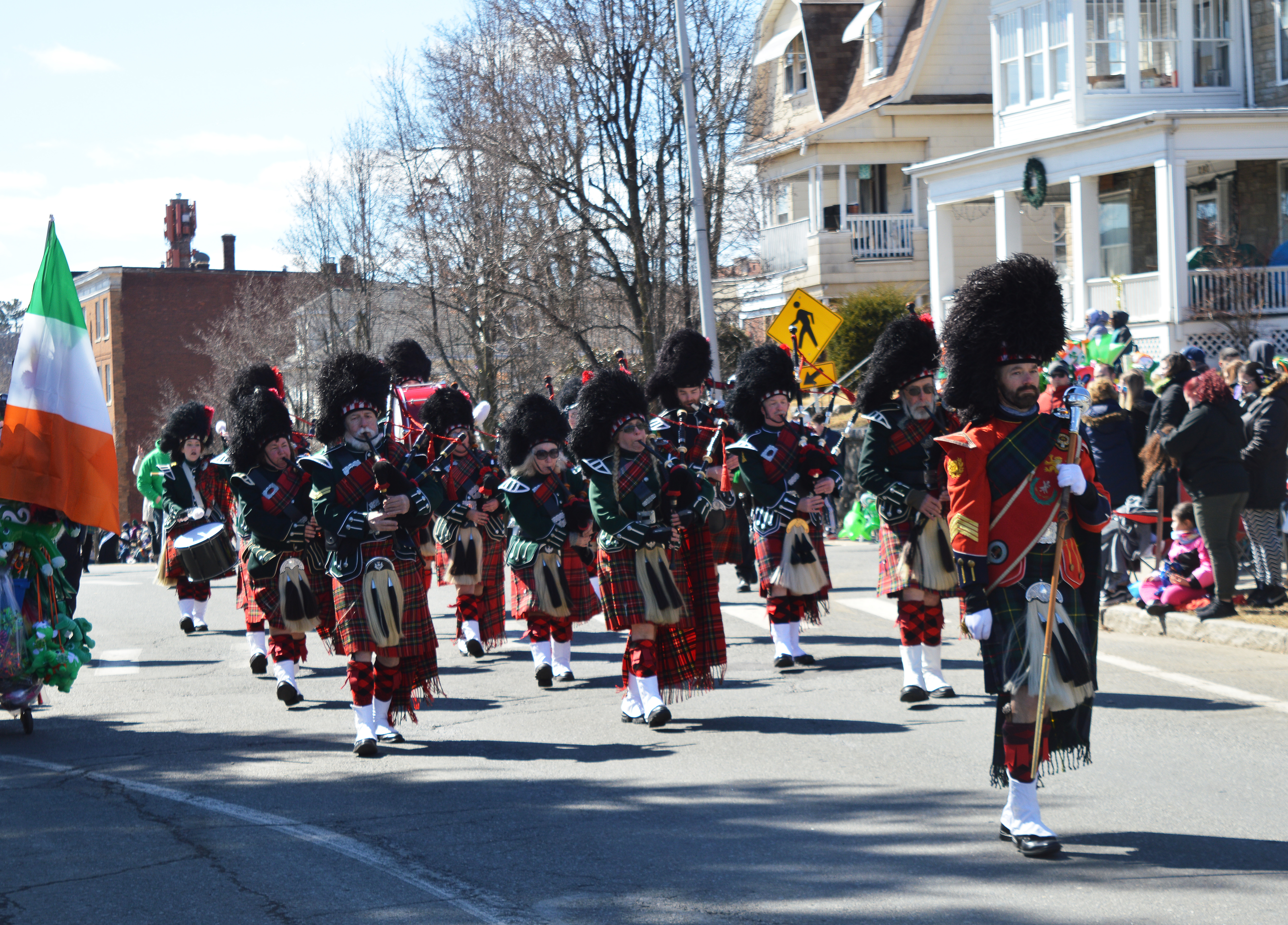
The pipe band performing in the 2019 Holyoke Saint Patrick's Day Parade

The band would make its first official appearance in Holyoke in the July 4th parade of 1910, with 8 pipers, 2 snares, and a bass drummer led by pipe major Ramsay, who went on to serve the band in this capacity until 1930. In their first appearance the pipe band wore no special uniforms or tartan. Within the next year the band had taken up the Ramsay Tartan, which it wore until 1935 when the Gordon tartan was adopted, as this tartan was readily produced by a local Holyoke mill. From 1962 until today the band has worn the Royal Stewart tartan.

Early in the band's history, it inspired the creation of the now second-oldest continuously operating pipe band. The Manchester Pipe Band, was established in 1914 after a visit from the Holyoke Caledonians and their bandmaster, which was said to have inspired several students in that city to start their own. Members of both bands have in the past competed jointly in Scotland in the Cowal Games.
