= William Whiting =

William Whiting may refer to:

- William Whiting (1660–1724), colonel of a provincial regiment from Connecticut during the Siege of Port Royal (1710)
- William B. Whiting (1731–1796), New York politician
- William Whiting (Massachusetts politician) (1813–1873), member of the U.S. House of Representatives from Massachusetts
- William H.C. Whiting (1824–1865), U.S. Army and Confederate Army officer
- William Whiting (poet) (1825–1878), English writer and hymnist
- William Whiting II (1841–1911), member of the U.S. House of Representatives from Massachusetts
- William Austin Whiting (1855–1908), Hawaiian politician and lawyer
- William F. Whiting (1864–1936), U.S. Secretary of Commerce
