= Valley Health Systems =

Valley Health Systems may refer to:

- The Valley Hospital, a hospital in Ridgewood, New Jersey, whose affiliates fall under the handle the "Valley Health System"
- Holyoke Medical Center, a hospital in Holyoke, Massachusetts, whose affiliates fall under the handle "Valley Health Systems"
