= George C. Ewing =

American politician (1810–1888)

George Clinton Ewing
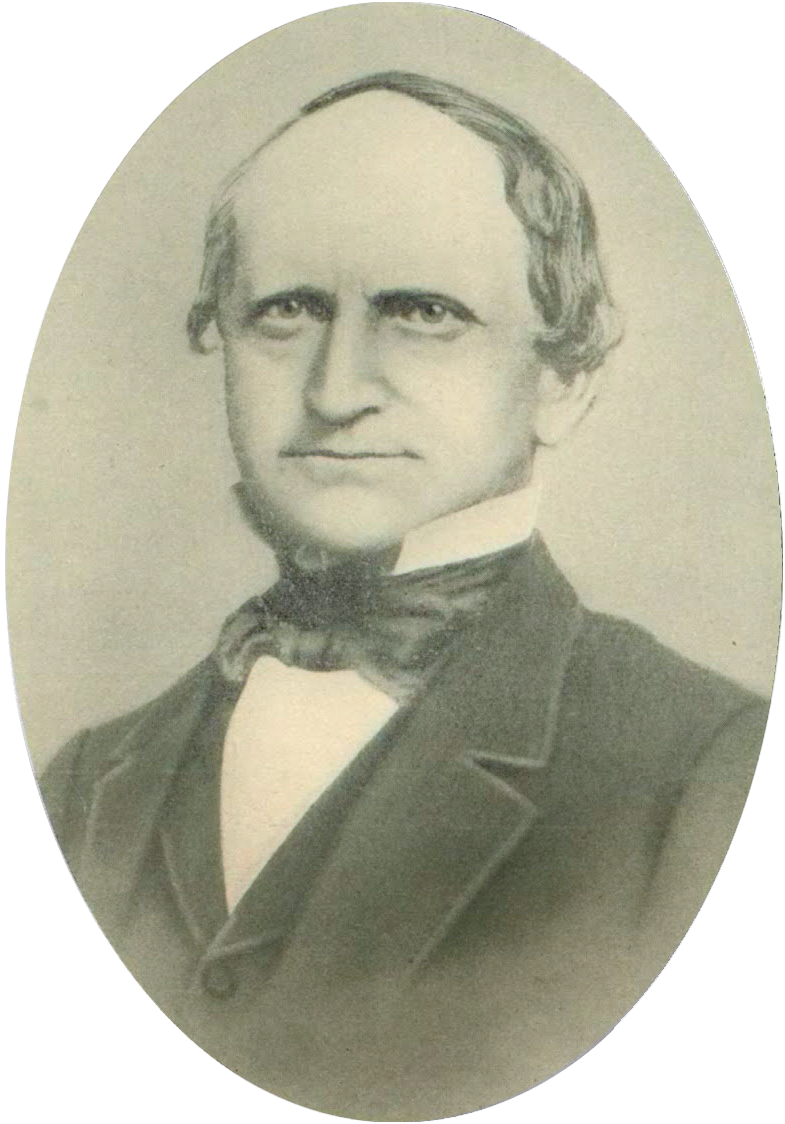

Member, Board of Directors of Holyoke National Bank
- In office 1872

Vice President of the Board of the Holyoke Public Library
- In office 1870-1871

Selectman of Holyoke
- In office 1869-1870

Superintendent of Holyoke Public Schools
- In office 1867-1869

Member of the Massachusetts House of Representatives
- In office 1852

Assessor of Holyoke
- In office 1851

Personal details
- Born: March/April, 1810 (Note: The sources cited dispute Ewing's month of birth.) Hudson, New York
- Died: July 16, 1888 (aged 78) Holyoke, Massachusetts
- Party: Whig Party; Prohibition Party
- Spouse: Lydia Ann Stillwell (m. 1834-1854; her death)
- Children: 5

George Clinton Ewing (March/April 1810 – July 16, 1888) was an American salesman, wainwright, land agent, superintendent, assessor, selectman, state representative, and most notably one of the chief founders of Holyoke, Massachusetts; he is credited as having first brought the idea of building a dam and industrial city at Hadley Falls to investors in Boston, New York, Hartford, and St. Johnsbury, Vermont in 1846.

== Personal life ==
Ewing was born in Hudson, New York on a day in March or April 1810 to Noble and Miriam (née Wolcott) Ewing. Early in his life, Ewing travelled to many locations, opening wainwright shops in Walpole, New Hampshire, Westminster, Vermont, and Littleton, New Hampshire. By the age of 30, he and his family had relocated to New York City where he became an associate of the Fairbanks Scale Company, serving as both a maker of scales and subsequently as a sales representative.

== Founding of the Hadley Falls Company ==
As a salesman for Fairbanks, Ewing travelled across the United States, Europe, and even Russia to expand the company's market. During his travels he had a chance to see the new dam and canals constructed at Lowell, and by 1846 had noticed that a 60-foot drop in the Connecticut River, at what would be Hadley Falls, would serve as an ideal location for a similar project. Having served many mills across the country as customers, Ewing was familiar not only with their operations but with their financiers as well. Although the company left the project soon after land was amassed, the Fairbanks Scale Company was largely responsible for the initial charter and water rights of the Hadley Falls Company. Ewing, having personally known Erastus Fairbanks, was able to convince him and a number of backers from Boston, Hartford, and New York to charter the company tasked with building a new planned industrial city. In March 1847 Ewing was appointed land agent and transferred 37 acres to the company, with very little resistance from the farmers whose land he had purchased. By the time Holyoke was chartered as a municipality this number had reached 1,300 acres. The one farmer who pushed back against the effort was one Sam Ely, who "declar[ed] that he would not sell to the 'cotton lords' of the Hadley [Falls] Company 'if they covered the entire field with gold dollars.' Finding no support from his contemporaries, Ely delayed sale of his land, but ultimately sold as well.

=== Labor disagreements and resignation ===
While Ewing, Fairbanks, and their associates were responsible for the conception of the Hadley Falls Company, their direct involvement in Holyoke's founding was cut short when Ewing severed ties as a company agent. Even during his time with the enterprise, Ewing had misgivings with his partners, the Boston Associates, including a decision to pay the dam's laborers 75 cents a day rather than the 85 cents they were initially promised; for the time he remained with the project Ewing paid the difference out of his own personal funds. A devout Christian, he fervently believed Sundays were a day of rest. When dam laborers were forced to work on Sundays, a strike broke out which was met with response from the state militia; it was not until a Catholic priest was brought from Springfield that the standoff was resolved. Finding fault with the actions of the company, Ewing and Fairbanks resigned from the enterprise thereafter. Their decision to leave the business proved sound when a series of poor design and construction decisions by the associates led to the very first dam washing down the Connecticut River within hours of its gates closing.

== Political career ==
Throughout his life Ewing had a varied political career of many positions both in Holyoke, and as a figure in Massachusetts politics. In his early political career he remained active in the Whig Party, serving as a delegate in at least one of the party's conventions in Boston. Having founded a Temperance Society in the city's earliest days, following the Whig Party's dissolution, Ewing became identified with the Prohibition Party.

In Holyoke, Ewing remained an ardent advocate of not only the city's development but also for reform of its labor, seeking to "bridge the growing gulf between the established and working classes", through such proposals as shorter hours for workers. One of the reforms he proposed was a law that would use state funds to compensate families whose children were attending school for the wages they would have made from working during that time; the motion lacked any political support. However, as superintendent of Holyoke's public schools from 1867 to 1868, he was able to successfully start an evening school program which proved a marked success; in 1868 there were 20 pupils in this program, by 1879 the number had grown to 300.

Among his many various positions in Holyoke civic life, Ewing served as an assessor in 1851, and a justice of the peace in 1855. In 1852 he served as a state representative to the Massachusetts General Court, the only official state office he held. Prior to its incorporation as a city, Ewing served as one of its selectmen from 1869 to 1870. When the Holyoke National Bank was founded in 1872, Ewing would serve as a member of its first board of directors.

Believing in prohibition for much of his life, Ewing was initially selected to run on the gubernatorial ticket of the Prohibition Party in 1878, but objected "the party ought to head the ticket with a bigger man than [himself], unless they prefer some one who isn't very well known". Ultimately the party selected Alonzo Ames Miner, Tufts University's second president to head the ticket instead. Ewing would run unsuccessfully for lieutenant governor in the gubernatorial race of 1878, receiving only 2,117 votes or 0.83% of the final count.

== Later life and death ==
George Ewing was a Congregationalist, serving as a lay preacher even into his later years for the Second Congregational Church of Holyoke, which he had joined in 1864. In his final years he wrote a history of the city to be published by its YMCA, which he proclaimed to the secretary of that chapter as well as his son, George Ewing Jr., would be his "last work". George Ewing died between the hours of six and seven on the evening of July 16, 1888; he was 78 years old.

== Ewingville ==
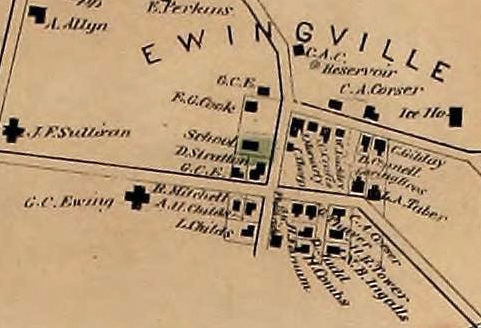
A section of a map of Ireland Parish, Holyoke, showing Ewingville as well as those properties owned by George C. Ewing, abbreviated "G.C.E."

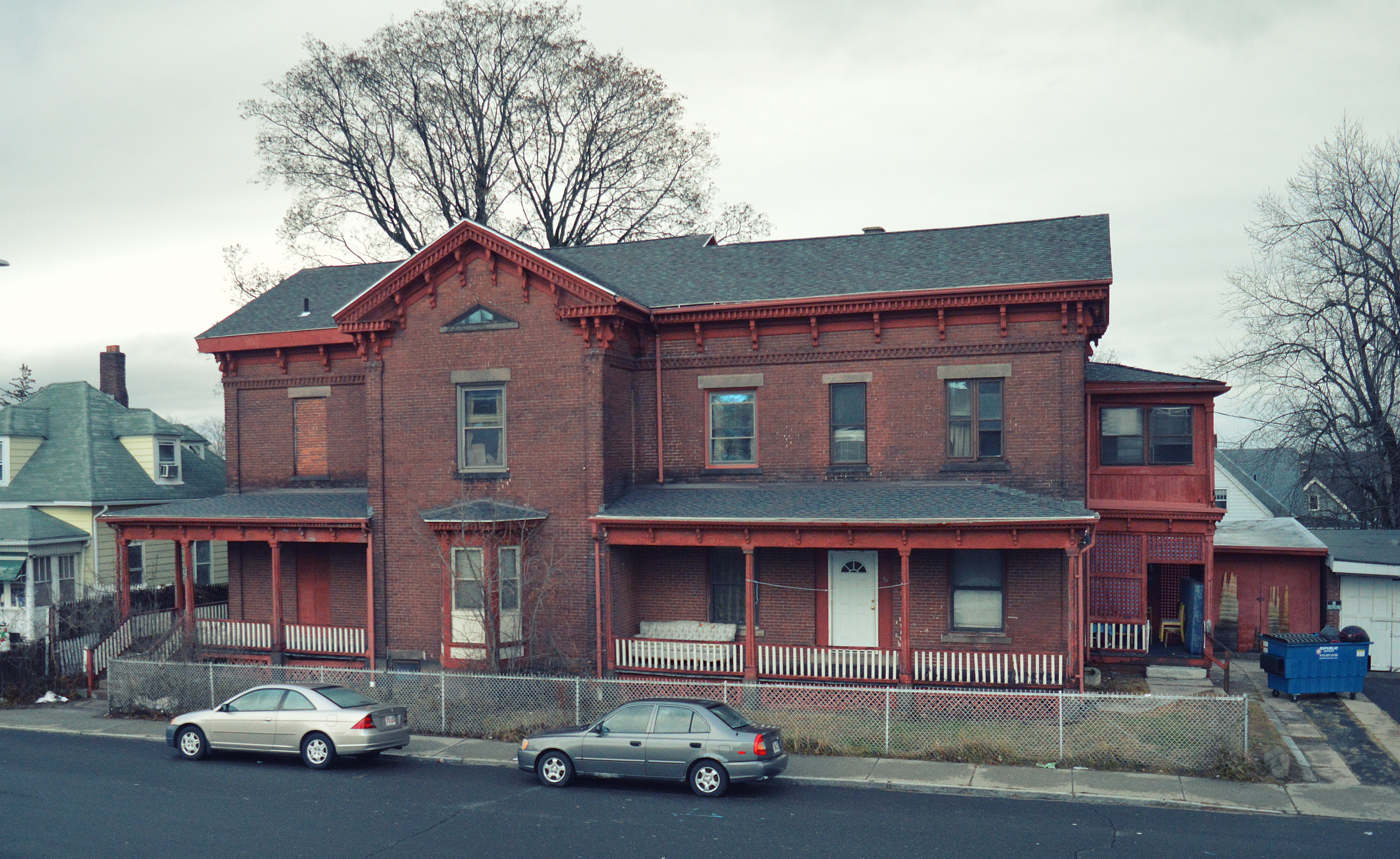
The George C. Ewing House; built before 1870, this Italianate structure was moved to its present site in 1925 during the construction of Our Lady of the Holy Cross Catholic Church.

In addition to purchasing land for the company, Ewing purchased a section of land for himself in an area between the Highlands and downtown Holyoke. With a patchwork of parcels owned by others, Ewing's large tract of land extended from west of Linden Street to Northampton Street; as far south as the present location of Forestdale Cemetery, and as far north as Beacon Avenue. Among his developments to that area, Ewing built four Italianate tenements along Dwight Street, connecting it from the Hadley Falls Company's grid to Northampton Street, a major thoroughfare.

Ewing constructed his own home there as well; the George C. Ewing House is a large brick Italianate structure with triangular windows and a brick cornice, built sometime before 1870. Following Ewing's death the building was sold to the Highland Parish in 1895 and used as a rectory until the house was moved to its present location in 1925 with the construction of the Holy Cross Roman Catholic Church.

== See also ==
- Boston Associates
- William Whiting II, another key figure in the founding of Holyoke, Massachusetts
