= Whiting Farms, Holyoke, Massachusetts =

Whiting Farms
- Neighborhood of Holyoke
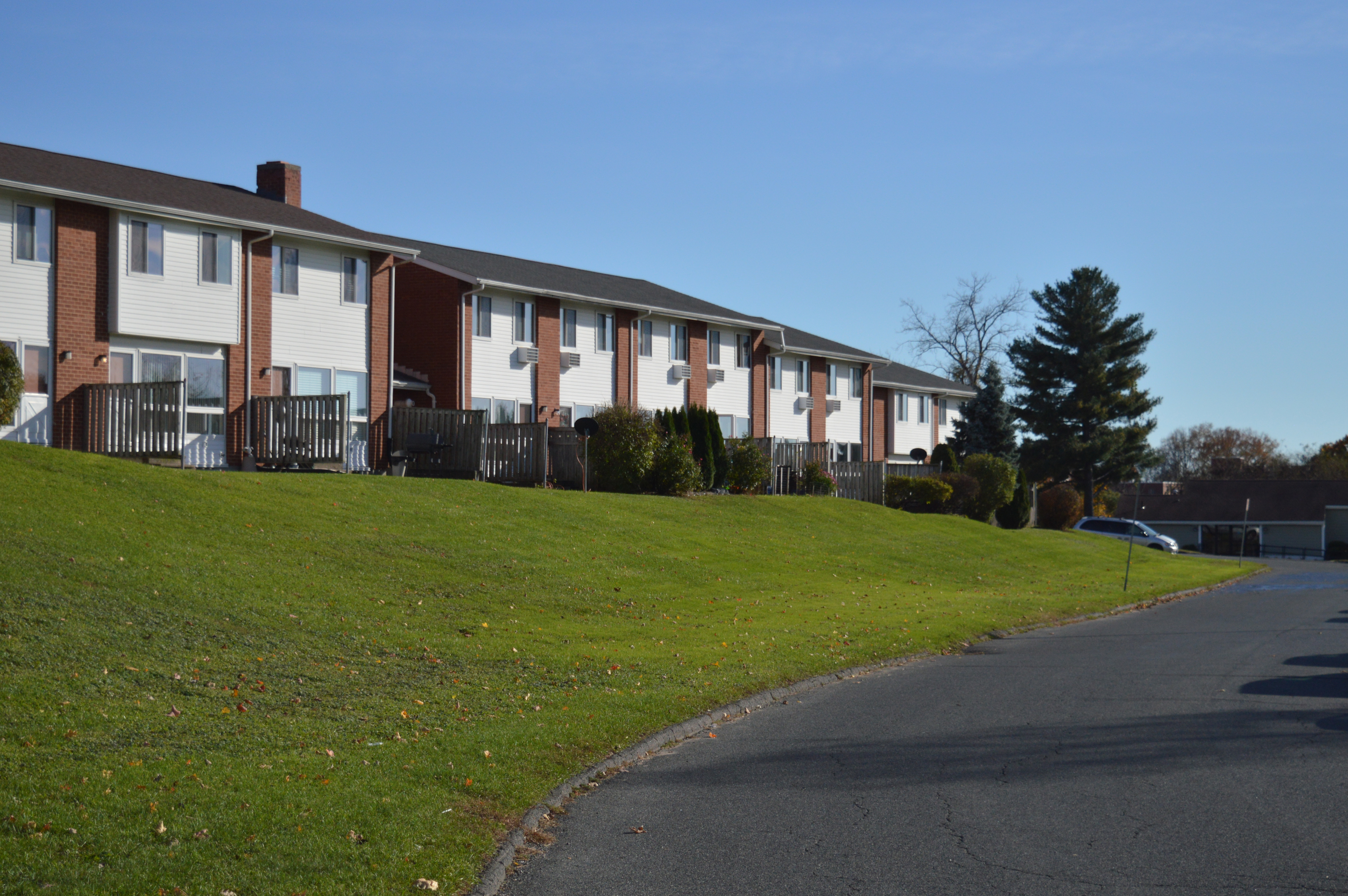
- Rowhouse apartments typical of Whiting Farms

- Location within Holyoke Location within Massachusetts Location within the United States
- Coordinates: 42.183582°N 72.634845°W
- Country: United States
- State: Massachusetts
- City: Holyoke
- Wards: 3, 5
- Precincts: 3A, 3B, 5B
- Developed: 1961

Area
  - Total: 0.64 sq mi (1.7 km^{2})
- Elevation: 318 ft (97 m)
- ZIP code: 01040
- Area code: 413

Whiting Farms is a neighborhood in Holyoke, Massachusetts, located to the southwest of the city center, approximately 2 miles (3.2 km) from downtown. Following the construction of Whiting Farms Road in 1961, the area was developed as a residential and commercial area in the 1960s and 1970s. Its name derives from its original use as site of the farm of William Whiting, where the former mayor and papermaker bred a prizewinning herd of Jersey cattle in the late 19th and early 20th century, many of which were sold for breeding to all parts of the country. A disastrous fire caused by arson in 1919 would kill off the entire herd of 75 head, and following this the farm, then-owned by William F. Whiting, became largely defunct. At the end of the Second World War it was proposed that the property be redeveloped into an airpark, however these plans would never come to fruition. Shortly after another case of arson in 1967 which destroyed a remaining barn, the property began to see the medium-density residential development that characterizes it today, with the First Whiting Farms Cooperative Housing breaking ground later that year. Initially criticized as the "Road to Nowhere" during Samuel Resnic's administration in the early 1960s, Whiting Farms Road today serves as a major artery for retail businesses and traffic to I-91 in the area.

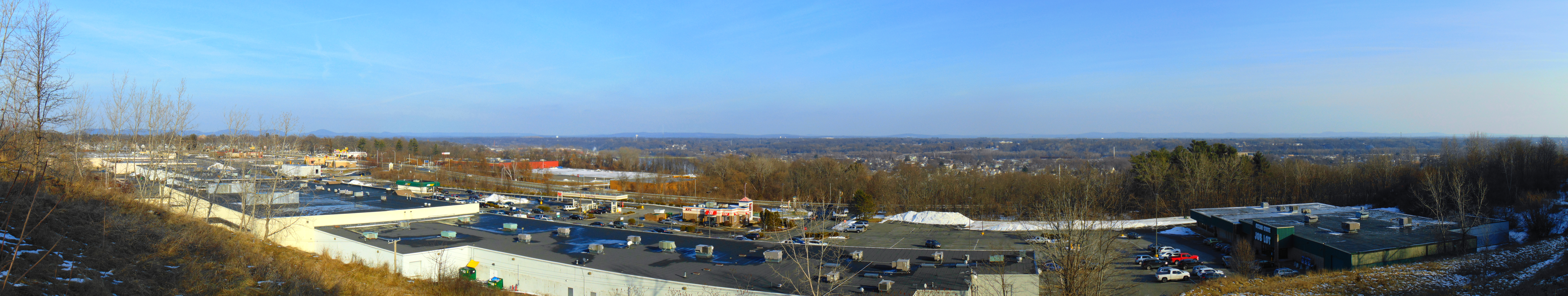
Holyoke Shopping Center, built on the fields and the site of the former farmhouse
