= William Franklin Draper (politician) =

American politician

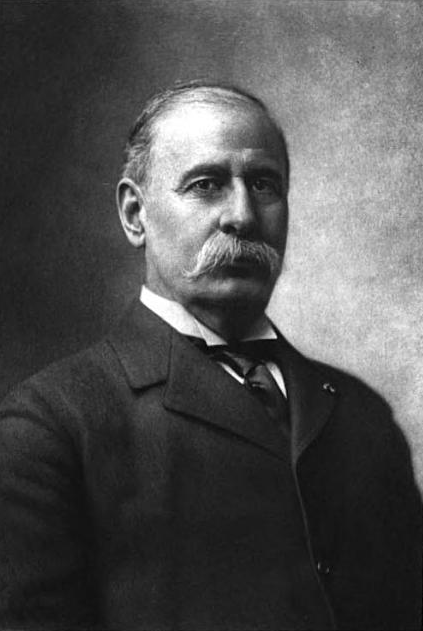

U.S. Ambassador and Minister Plenipotentiary to Italy
- In office 1897–1899
- President: William McKinley
- Preceded by: Wayne MacVeagh
- Succeeded by: George von Lengerke Meyer

Member of the U.S. House of Representatives from Massachusetts's 11th district
- In office March 4, 1893 – March 3, 1897
- Preceded by: Frederick S. Coolidge
- Succeeded by: Charles F. Sprague

Personal details
- Born: April 9, 1842 Lowell, Massachusetts, U.S.
- Died: January 28, 1910 (aged 67) Washington, D.C., U.S.
- Resting place: Hopedale Village Cemetery, Hopedale, Massachusetts
- Party: Republican
- Spouse(s): Lydia Joy; Susan Preston m. May 22, 1890.
- Awards: Brevet Colonel; Brevet Brigadier General.
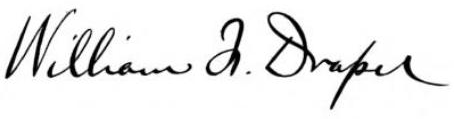
- Signature

Military service
- Allegiance: (United States) United States; Union
- Branch/service: United States Army; Union Army
- Years of service: September 5, 1861-October 12, 1864
- Rank: Private; (September 5, 1861); *Second Lieutenant (September 18, 1861); *Captain (August 12, 1862); *Lieutenant Colonel (May 6, 1963);
- Unit: Company B, 25th Massachusetts Volunteer Infantry. * 36th Massachusetts Volunteer Infantry.
- Battles/wars: American Civil War; Siege of Vicksburg; Battle of the Wilderness; Siege of Petersburg; Second Battle of the Weldon Railroad

William Franklin Draper (April 9, 1842 – January 28, 1910) was an American businessman, industrialist, and soldier who served as a U.S. representative from Massachusetts.

== Biography ==
Draper was born in Lowell, Massachusetts on April 9, 1842, and was a descendant of early Massachusetts settler James Draper. Draper attended public, private, and high schools, he studied mechanical engineering and cotton manufacturing.

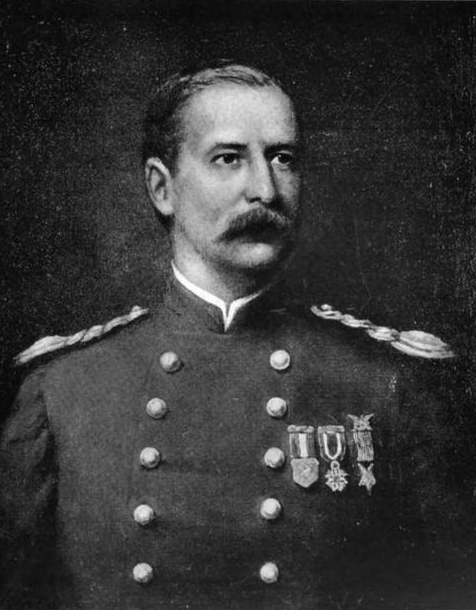
William F. Draper at the end of the American Civil War.

During the American Civil War Draper enlisted as a private in the Twenty-fifth Regiment, Massachusetts Volunteer Infantry, on September 9, 1861. He was soon elected Second Lieutenant of his company and was promoted rapidly to lieutenant colonel. After his discharge Draper was awarded the brevet grades of colonel and brigadier general of Volunteers.

After the war he joined his family's textile machine manufacturing business at Hopedale, Massachusetts, and patented many improvements. He also served as delegate to the Republican National Convention in 1876. He went on to serve as colonel on the staff of Governor John Davis Long from 1880 to 1883.

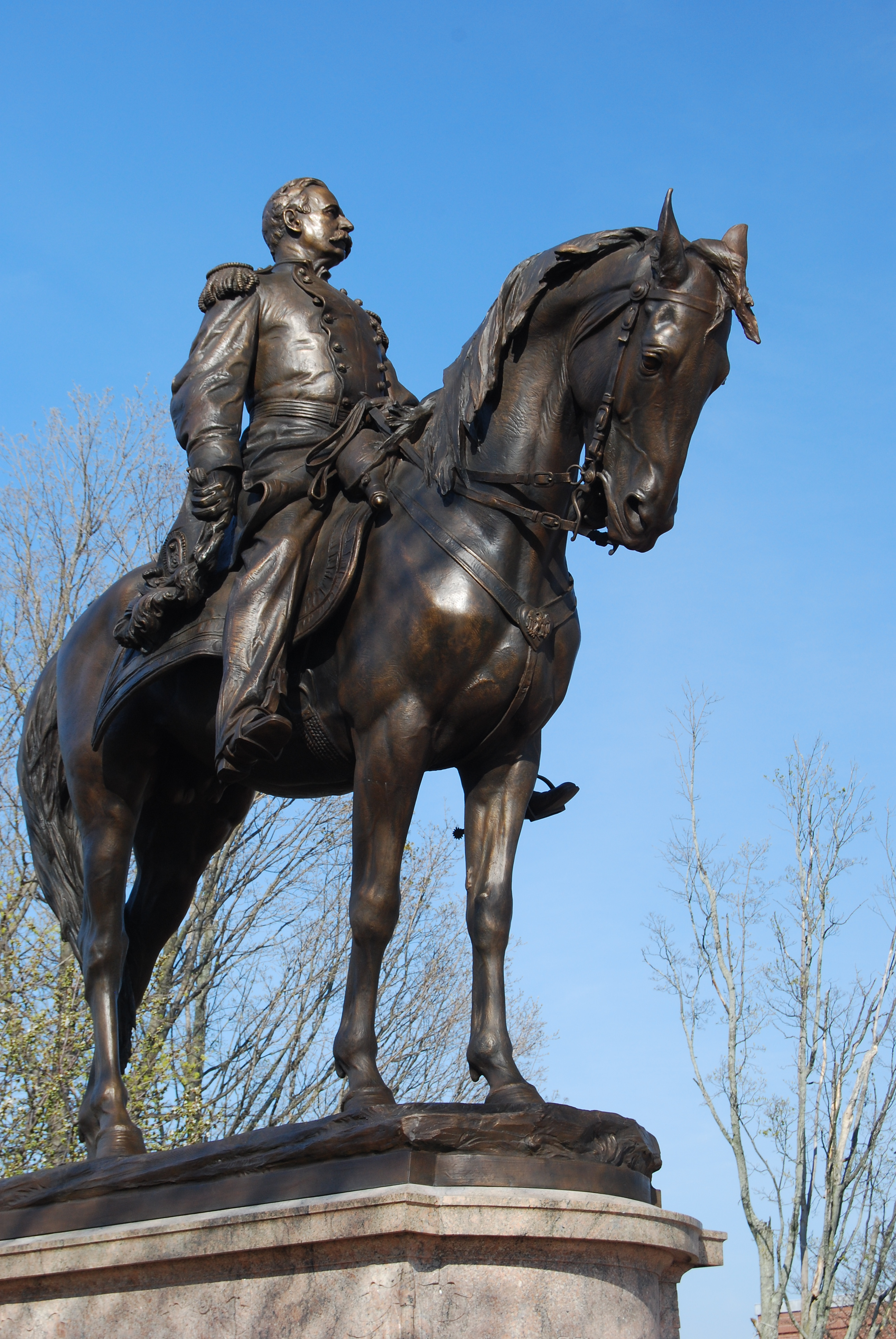
Equestrian statue of Draper erected in 1912 in Milford, Massachusetts.

Draper was elected as a Republican to the Fifty-third and Fifty-fourth Congresses (March 4, 1893 – March 3, 1897). Draper served as chairman of the Committee on Patents (Fifty-fourth Congress), however he was not a candidate for renomination in 1896. He later served as president of the Draper Co. upon its incorporation in 1896. Later he was the Ambassador and Minister Plenipotentiary to Italy 1897–1899.

Draper was married twice: to Lydia Joy from 1862 until her death in 1884, and to Susan Preston, daughter of General William Preston of Kentucky, who survived him. His second marriage may be the only one in which a Union general married the daughter of a Confederate general. Their daughter Margaret Preston Draper married Italian aristocrat Prince Andrea Boncompagni-Ludovisi.

He died in Washington, D.C., on January 28, 1910, he was interred in Village Cemetery, Hopedale, Massachusetts.

== See also ==
- List of Massachusetts generals in the American Civil War
- Massachusetts in the American Civil War

Diplomatic posts
Preceded by Wayne MacVeagh	Ambassador and Minister Plenipotentiary to Italy; 1897–1899	Succeeded by George von Lengerke Meyer
U.S. House of Representatives
Preceded by Frederick S. Coolidge	Member of the U.S. House of Representatives; Massachusetts's 11th district March 4, 1893-March 3, 1897	Succeeded by Charles F. Sprague
