= Frederick S. Coolidge =

American politician

Frederick Spaulding Coolidge
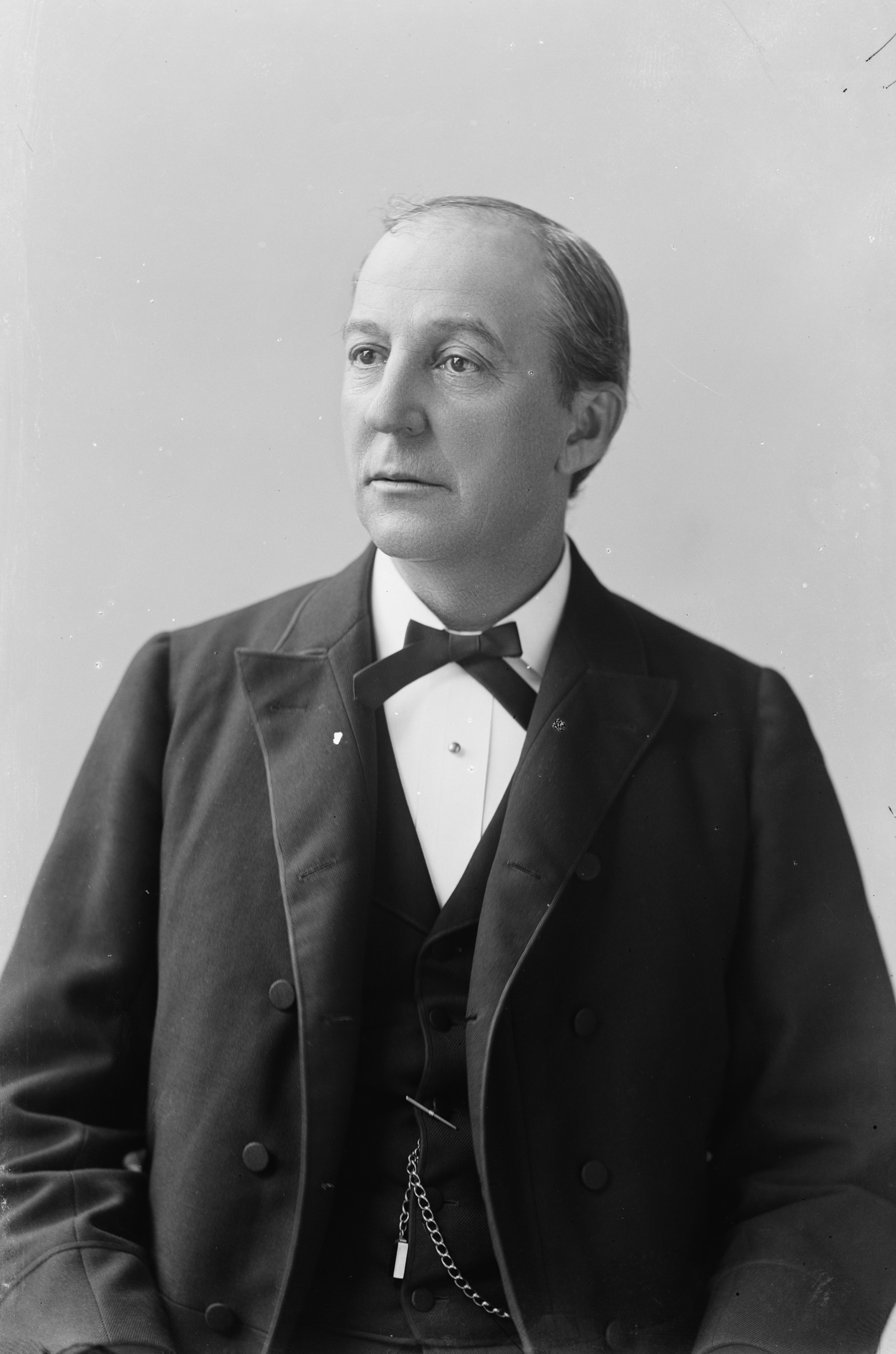

Member of the U.S. House of Representatives from Massachusetts's 11th district
- In office March 4, 1891 – March 3, 1893
- Preceded by: Rodney Wallace
- Succeeded by: William F. Draper

Member of the Board of Selectmen Westminster, Massachusetts

Member of the Massachusetts House of Representatives
- In office 1875–1875

Personal details
- Born: December 7, 1841 Westminster, Massachusetts, U.S.
- Died: June 8, 1906 (aged 64) Fitchburg, Massachusetts, U.S.
- Resting place: Mount Pleasant Cemetery, Westminster, Massachusetts
- Party: Democrat
- Spouse: Ellen Drusilla Allen
- Children: 3, including Marcus A. Coolidge
- Profession: Businessman, chair manufacturer

Frederick Spaulding Coolidge (December 7, 1841 – June 8, 1906) was a U.S. representative from Massachusetts and the father of United States senator Marcus Allen Coolidge.

== Biography ==
Born to Charles and Nancy (Spaulding) Coolidge in Westminster, Massachusetts, he was a descendant on his father's side of Thomas Hastings who came from the East Anglia region of England to the Massachusetts Bay Colony in 1634. Coolidge attended the common schools. He began his career working at his father's chair factory, however in 1876 his father's factory burned down. After the destruction of his father's factory Coolidge became manager of the Boston Chair Manufacturing Co. in Ashburnham, Massachusetts and later of the Leominster Rattan Works. Coolidge was a member of the Board of Selectmen of his native town for three years. He served as member of the Democratic State Central Committee.

Coolidge served as member of the Massachusetts House of Representatives in 1875.

Coolidge was elected as a Democrat to the Fifty-second Congress (March 4, 1891 – March 3, 1893).

While in Congress Coolidge served on the Committee on Pacific Railroads and on the Select Committee on Irrigation of Arid Lands in the United States. He was an unsuccessful candidate for reelection in 1892 to the Fifty-third Congress. He retired from active business pursuits.

His daughter, Cora Helen Coolidge, went on to be president of Pennsylvania College for Women (now Chatham University).

== Death and burial ==
Coolidge died in Fitchburg, Massachusetts, on June 8, 1906. He was interred in Mount Pleasant Cemetery, Westminster, Massachusetts.

== See also ==
- 1875 Massachusetts legislature

== Bibliography ==
- Buckminster, Lydia N. H.: The Hastings Memorial, A Genealogical Account of the Descendants of Thomas Hastings of Watertown, Mass. from 1634 to 1864, Boston: Samuel G. Drake Publisher (an undated NEHGS photoduplicate of the 1866 edition).
- Fulham, Volney Sewall (1909), The Fulham Genealogy: With Index of Names and Blanks for Records, Burlington, VT: Free Press Printing Co., pp. 132–133

U.S. House of Representatives
Preceded by Rodney Wallace	Member of the U.S. House of Representatives from Massachusetts's 11th congressional district March 4, 1891 - March 3, 1893	Succeeded by William F. Draper
