= Massachusetts's 11th congressional district =

Former U.S. House district from 1795 to 1993

- Obsolete district
- Created: 1795; 1850; 1870
- Eliminated: 1840; 1860; 1990
- Years active: 1795–1843; 1853–1863; 1873–1993

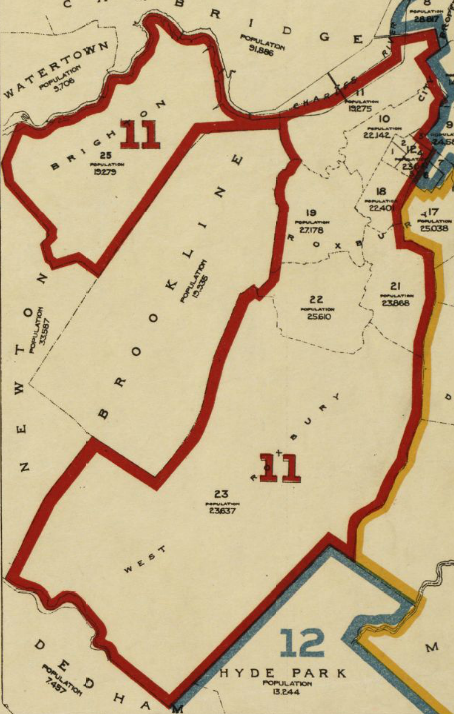
Massachusetts's 11th congressional district, 1901

Massachusetts's current districts, since 2013

Massachusetts's 11th congressional district is an obsolete district that was active during three periods: 1795–1843, 1853–1863, and 1873–1993. The district was located in several different areas of the state. It was most recently eliminated in 1993 after the 1990 U.S. census. Its last congressman was Brian J. Donnelly.

Notable persons elected to the U.S. House of Representatives from the 11th congressional district include John Quincy Adams following his term as president, John F. Kennedy prior to his term as president, and Tip O'Neill prior to his selection as Speaker of the House.

== Cities and towns in the district ==
=== 1890s ===
1893: Suffolk County: Boston, Wards 21, 22. 23, 25. "Middlesex County: City of Newton, towns of Belmont, Holliston, Sherborn, and Water- town. Norfolk County: Towns of Bellingham, Brookline, Dedham, Dover, Foxboro, Franklin, Hyde Park, Medfield, Medway, Millis, Needham, Norfolk, Norwood, Sharon, Walpole, and Wrentham. Bristol County: Town of North Attleboro. Worcester County: Towns of Hopedale and Milford."

=== 1910s–1940s ===
1916: Suffolk County: Boston Wards 10, 11 (Precincts 3, 4, 5, 6, 7, 8, 9), 12, 18, 19, 21, 22, 23.

1921: Boston (Wards 7, 8, 13, 14, 15, 16, 22, 23).

1941: Boston (Wards 1, 2, 3, 22), Cambridge, Somerville (Wards 1, 2, 3).

=== 1960s–1980s ===
1968: "Norfolk County: City of Quincy. Towns of Avon, Braintree, Canton, Dedham, Holbrook, Milton, Norwood, Randolph, Sharon, Stoughton, and Weymouth. Plymouth County: City of Brockton. Suffolk County: City of Boston: Ward 18."

1977: "Norfolk County: City of Quincy. Towns of Avon, Braintree, Holbrook, Milton, Randolph, and Stoughton. Plymouth County: City of Brockton. Towns of Abington and Whitman. Suffolk County: City of Boston: Wards 15, 16, 17, 18."

1985: "Norfolk County: City of Quincy. Towns of Avon, Braintree, Holbrook, Milton, Randolph, and Weymouth. Plymouth County: City of Brockton. Towns of Abington, East Bridgewater, Rockland, West Bridgewater, and Whitman. Suffolk County: City of Boston: Wards 15, 16, 17, and 18."

== List of members representing the district ==
| Representative (District home) | Party | Years | Cong ress | Electoral history | District location |
|---|---|---|---|---|---|
District created March 4, 1795
| Theophilus Bradbury (Newburyport) | Federalist | March 4, 1795 – July 24, 1797 | 4th 5th | Elected in 1795 on the third ballot. Re-elected in 1796. Resigned to become a Massachusetts Supreme Court Justice. | 1795 – 1803 "4th Middle district" |
| Vacant | | July 25, 1797 – November 26, 1797 | 5th | | 1795 – 1803 "4th Middle district" |
| Bailey Bartlett (Haverhill) | Federalist | November 27, 1797 – March 3, 1801 | 5th 6th | Elected August 4, 1797, to finish Bradbury's term and seated November 27, 1797. Re-elected in 1798. Retired. | 1795 – 1803 "4th Middle district" |
| Manasseh Cutler (Hamilton) | Federalist | March 4, 1801 – March 3, 1803 | 7th | Elected in 1800. Redistricted to the 3rd district. | 1795 – 1803 "4th Middle district" |
| William Stedman (Worcester) | Federalist | March 4, 1803 – July 16, 1810 | 8th 9th 10th 11th | Elected in 1802. Re-elected in 1804. Re-elected in 1806. Re-elected in 1808. Resigned to become Clerk of Courts for Worcester County. | 1803 – 1815 "Worcester North district" |
| Vacant | | July 16, 1810 – October 8, 1810 | 11th | | 1803 – 1815 "Worcester North district" |
| Abijah Bigelow (Leominster) | Federalist | October 8, 1810 – March 3, 1815 | 11th 12th 13th | Elected to finish Stedman's term. Re-elected in 1810. Re-elected in 1812. Redistricted to the 12th district and retired. | 1803 – 1815 "Worcester North district" |
| Elijah Brigham (Westborough (now Northborough)) | Federalist | March 4, 1815 – February 22, 1816 | 14th | Redistricted from the 10th district and re-elected in 1814. Died. | 1815 – 1823 "Worcester South district" |
| Vacant | | February 22, 1816 – December 1, 1816 | 14th | | 1815 – 1823 "Worcester South district" |
| Benjamin Adams (Uxbridge) | Federalist | December 2, 1816 – March 3, 1821 | 14th 15th 16th | Elected August 26, 1816, to finish Brigham's term and seated December 2, 1816. Re-elected in 1816. Re-elected in 1818. Lost re-election. | 1815 – 1823 "Worcester South district" |
| Johnathan Russell (Mendon) | Democratic- Republican | March 4, 1821 – March 3, 1823 | 17th | Elected in 1820. Redistricted to the 5th district and retired. | 1815 – 1823 "Worcester South district" |
| Aaron Hobart (East Bridgewater) | Democratic- Republican | March 4, 1823 – March 3, 1825 | 18th 19th | Redistricted from the 8th district and re-elected in 1822. Re-elected in 1824. [data missing] | 1823 – 1833 [data missing] |
| Aaron Hobart (East Bridgewater) | Anti-Jacksonian | March 4, 1825 – March 3, 1827 | 18th 19th | Redistricted from the 8th district and re-elected in 1822. Re-elected in 1824. [data missing] | 1823 – 1833 [data missing] |
| Joseph Richardson (Hingham) | Anti-Jacksonian | March 4, 1827 – March 3, 1831 | 20th 21st | Elected in 1826. Re-elected in 1828. Retired. | 1823 – 1833 [data missing] |
| John Quincy Adams (Quincy) | Anti-Jacksonian | March 4, 1831 – March 3, 1833 | 22nd | Elected in 1830. Redistricted to the 12th district. | 1823 – 1833 [data missing] |
| John Reed Jr. (Yarmouth) | Anti-Jacksonian | March 4, 1833 – March 3, 1835 | 23rd 24th 25th 26th | Elected in 1833. Re-elected in 1834. Re-elected in 1836. Re-elected in 1838. [data missing] | 1833 – 1843 [data missing] |
| John Reed Jr. (Yarmouth) | Anti- Masonic | March 4, 1835 – March 3, 1837 | 23rd 24th 25th 26th | Elected in 1833. Re-elected in 1834. Re-elected in 1836. Re-elected in 1838. [data missing] | 1833 – 1843 [data missing] |
| John Reed Jr. (Yarmouth) | Whig | March 4, 1837 – March 3, 1841 | 23rd 24th 25th 26th | Elected in 1833. Re-elected in 1834. Re-elected in 1836. Re-elected in 1838. [data missing] | 1833 – 1843 [data missing] |
| Barker Burnell (Nantucket) | Whig | March 4, 1841 – March 3, 1843 | 27th | Elected in 1840. Redistricted to the 10th district. | 1833 – 1843 [data missing] |
District eliminated March 3, 1843
District re-created March 4, 1853
| John Z. Goodrich (Glendale) | Whig | March 4, 1853 – March 3, 1855 | 33rd | Redistricted from the 7th district and re-elected in 1852. [data missing] | 1853–1863 [data missing] |
| Mark Trafton (Westfield) | Know Nothing | March 4, 1855 – March 3, 1857 | 34th | Elected in 1854. [data missing] | 1853–1863 [data missing] |
| Henry L. Dawes (North Adams) | Republican | March 4, 1857 – March 3, 1863 | 35th 36th 37th | Elected in 1856. Re-elected in 1858. Re-elected in 1860. Redistricted to the 10th district. | 1853–1863 [data missing] |
District eliminated March 3, 1863
District re-created March 4, 1873
| Henry L. Dawes (Pittsfield) | Republican | March 4, 1873 – March 3, 1875 | 43rd | Redistricted from the 10th district and re-elected in 1872. [data missing] | 1873–1883 [data missing] |
| Chester W. Chapin (Springfield) | Democratic | March 4, 1875 – March 3, 1877 | 44th | Elected in 1874. [data missing] | 1873–1883 [data missing] |
| George D. Robinson (Chicopee) | Republican | March 4, 1877 – March 3, 1883 | 45th 46th 47th | Elected in 1876. Re-elected in 1878. Re-elected in 1880. Redistricted to the 12th district. | 1873–1883 [data missing] |
| William Whiting (Holyoke) | Republican | March 4, 1883 – March 3, 1889 | 48th 49th 50th | Elected in 1882. Re-elected in 1884. Re-elected in 1886. [data missing] | 1883–1893 [data missing] |
| Rodney Wallace (Fitchburg) | Republican | March 4, 1889 – March 3, 1891 | 51st | Elected in 1888. [data missing] | 1883–1893 [data missing] |
| Frederick S. Coolidge (Ashburnham) | Democratic | March 4, 1891 – March 3, 1893 | 52nd | Elected in 1890. [data missing] | 1883–1893 [data missing] |
| William F. Draper (Hopedale) | Republican | March 4, 1893 – March 3, 1897 | 53rd 54th | Elected in 1892. Re-elected in 1894. [data missing] | 1893–1903 [data missing] |
| Charles F. Sprague (Brookline) | Republican | March 4, 1897 – March 3, 1901 | 55th 56th | Elected in 1896. Re-elected in 1898. [data missing] | 1893–1903 [data missing] |
| Samuel L. Powers (Newton) | Republican | March 4, 1901 – March 3, 1903 | 57th | Elected in 1900. Redistricted to the 12th district. | 1893–1903 [data missing] |
| John Andrew Sullivan (Boston) | Democratic | March 4, 1903 – March 3, 1907 | 58th 59th | Elected in 1902. Re-elected in 1904. [data missing] | 1903–1913 [data missing] |
| Andrew J. Peters (Boston) | Democratic | March 4, 1907 – August 15, 1914 | 60th 61st 62nd 63rd | Elected in 1906. Re-elected in 1908. Re-elected in 1910. Re-elected in 1912. Resigned to become Asst. Secretary to the US Treasury Department. | 1903–1913 [data missing] |
| Andrew J. Peters (Boston) | Democratic | March 4, 1907 – August 15, 1914 | 60th 61st 62nd 63rd | Elected in 1906. Re-elected in 1908. Re-elected in 1910. Re-elected in 1912. Resigned to become Asst. Secretary to the US Treasury Department. | 1913–1923 [data missing] |
| Vacant | | August 15, 1914 – March 3, 1915 | 63rd | | 1913–1923 [data missing] |
| George H. Tinkham (Boston) | Republican | March 4, 1915 – March 3, 1933 | 64th 65th 66th 67th 68th 69th 70th 71st 72nd | Elected in 1914. Re-elected in 1916. Re-elected in 1918. Re-elected in 1920. Re-elected in 1922. Re-elected in 1924. Re-elected in 1926. Re-elected in 1928. Re-elected in 1930. Redistricted to the 10th district. | 1913–1923 [data missing] |
| George H. Tinkham (Boston) | Republican | March 4, 1915 – March 3, 1933 | 64th 65th 66th 67th 68th 69th 70th 71st 72nd | Elected in 1914. Re-elected in 1916. Re-elected in 1918. Re-elected in 1920. Re-elected in 1922. Re-elected in 1924. Re-elected in 1926. Re-elected in 1928. Re-elected in 1930. Redistricted to the 10th district. | 1923–1933 [data missing] |
| John J. Douglass (Boston) | Democratic | March 4, 1933 – January 3, 1935 | 73rd | Redistricted from the 10th district and re-elected in 1932. [data missing] | 1933–1943 [data missing] |
| John P. Higgins (Boston) | Democratic | January 3, 1935 – September 30, 1937 | 74th 75th | Elected in 1934. Re-elected in 1936. Resigned to become chief justice of Superior Court of Massachusetts. | 1933–1943 [data missing] |
| Vacant | | September 30, 1937 – December 14, 1937 | 75th | | 1933–1943 [data missing] |
| Thomas A. Flaherty (Boston) | Democratic | December 14, 1937 – January 3, 1943 | 75th 76th 77th | Elected to finish Higgins's term. Re-elected in 1938. Re-elected in 1940. Retired. | 1933–1943 [data missing] |
| James Michael Curley (Boston) | Democratic | January 3, 1943 – January 3, 1947 | 78th 79th | Elected in 1942. Re-elected in 1944. Retired. | 1943–1953 [data missing] |
| John F. Kennedy (Boston) | Democratic | January 3, 1947 – January 3, 1953 | 80th 81st 82nd | Elected in 1946. Re-elected in 1948. Re-elected in 1950. Retired to run for U.S. Senator. | 1943–1953 [data missing] |
| Tip O'Neill (Cambridge) | Democratic | January 3, 1953 – January 3, 1963 | 83rd 84th 85th 86th 87th | Elected in 1952. Re-elected in 1954. Re-elected in 1956. Re-elected in 1958. Re-elected in 1960. Redistricted to the 8th district. | 1953–1963 [data missing] |
| James A. Burke (Milton) | Democratic | January 3, 1963 – January 3, 1979 | 88th 89th 90th 91st 92nd 93rd 94th 95th | Redistricted from the 13th district and re-elected in 1962. Re-elected in 1964. Re-elected in 1966. Re-elected in 1968. Re-elected in 1970. Re-elected in 1972; Re-elected in 1974. Re-elected in 1976. [data missing] | 1963–1973 [data missing] |
| James A. Burke (Milton) | Democratic | January 3, 1963 – January 3, 1979 | 88th 89th 90th 91st 92nd 93rd 94th 95th | Redistricted from the 13th district and re-elected in 1962. Re-elected in 1964. Re-elected in 1966. Re-elected in 1968. Re-elected in 1970. Re-elected in 1972; Re-elected in 1974. Re-elected in 1976. [data missing] | 1973–1983 [data missing] |
| Brian J. Donnelly (Boston) | Democratic | January 3, 1979 – January 3, 1993 | 96th 97th 98th 99th 100th 101st 102nd | Elected in 1978. Re-elected in 1980. Re-elected in 1982. Re-elected in 1984. Re-elected in 1986. Re-elected in 1988. Re-elected in 1990. Retired. | 1973–1983 [data missing] |
| Brian J. Donnelly (Boston) | Democratic | January 3, 1979 – January 3, 1993 | 96th 97th 98th 99th 100th 101st 102nd | Elected in 1978. Re-elected in 1980. Re-elected in 1982. Re-elected in 1984. Re-elected in 1986. Re-elected in 1988. Re-elected in 1990. Retired. | 1983–1993 [data missing] |
District eliminated January 3, 1993
