= Rodney Wallace (politician) =

American politician

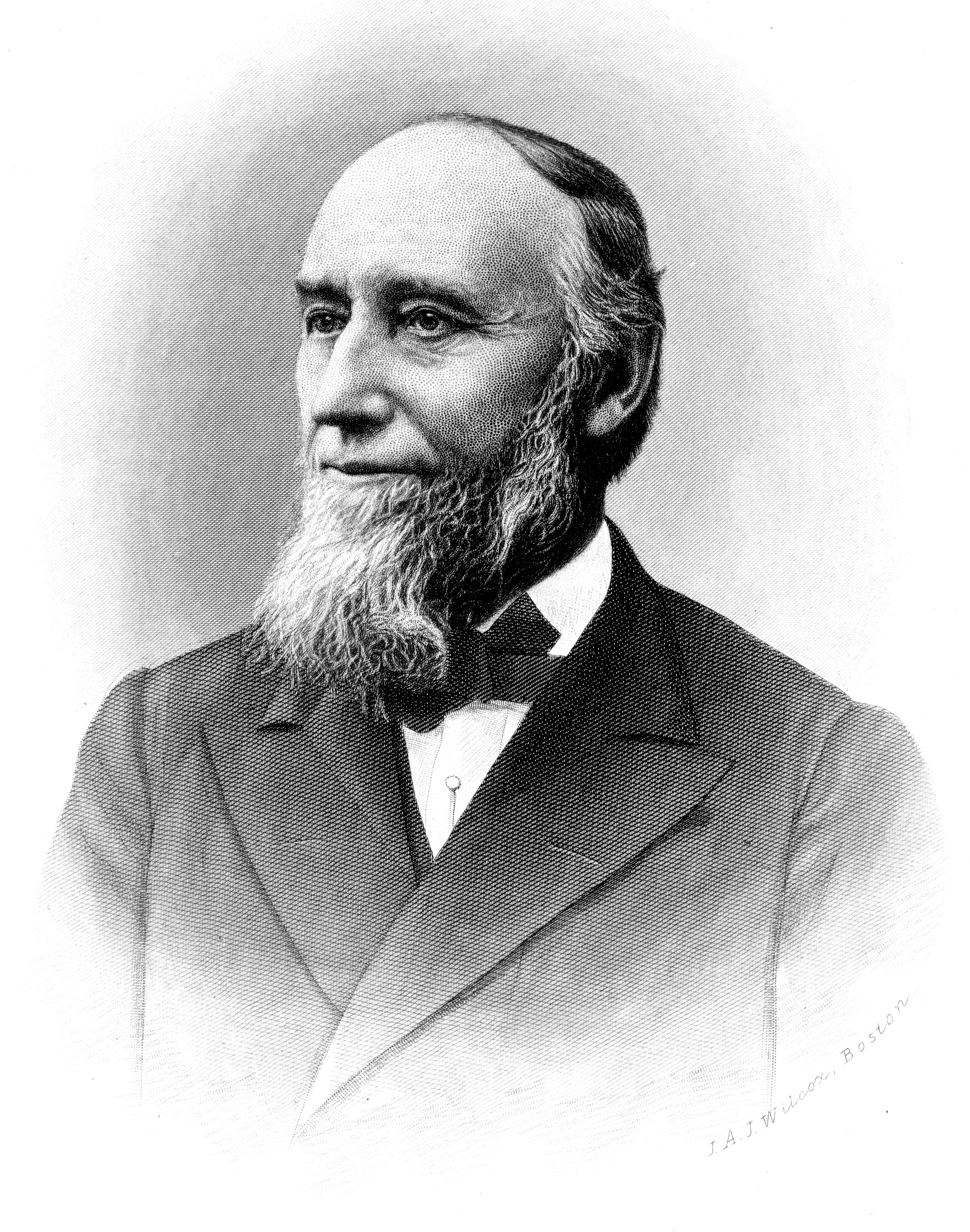

Member of the U.S. House of Representatives from Massachusetts's 11th district
- In office March 4, 1889 – March 3, 1891
- Preceded by: William Whiting II
- Succeeded by: Frederick S. Coolidge

Town of Fitchburg Board of Selectmen
- In office 1864–1867

Massachusetts House of Representatives
- In office 1873–1873

Massachusetts Governor's Councilor for the 7th Council district
- In office 1880–1882

Personal details
- Born: New Ipswich, New Hampshire
- Spouse(s): Sophia Ingalls (died June 20, 1871); Sophia F. Bailey
- Children: Herbert I. Wallace, George I. Wallace
- Profession: Businessman; Paper maker

Rodney Wallace (December 21, 1823 – February 27, 1903) was a U.S. representative from Massachusetts.

Born in New Ipswich, New Hampshire, Wallace attended the common schools. He engaged in the manufacture of paper. He was a member of the Board of Selectmen of Fitchburg, Massachusetts, in 1864, 1865, and 1867. He served in the Massachusetts House of Representatives in 1873. He served as member of the Massachusetts Governor's Council from 1880 to 1882.

Wallace was elected as a Republican to the Fifty-first Congress (March 4, 1889 – March 3, 1891). Wallace was not a candidate for renomination in 1890 to the Fifty-second Congress. After serving in congress Wallace returned to the business of manufacturing paper. He died in Fitchburg, Massachusetts, on February 27, 1903. He was interred in Laurel Hill Cemetery.

== See also ==
- 1873 Massachusetts legislature

U.S. House of Representatives
Preceded by William Whiting	Member of the U.S. House of Representatives from Massachusetts's 11th congressional district March 4, 1889 - March 3, 1891	Succeeded by Frederick S. Coolidge
