= Charles F. Sprague =

American politician

Charles Franklin Sprague
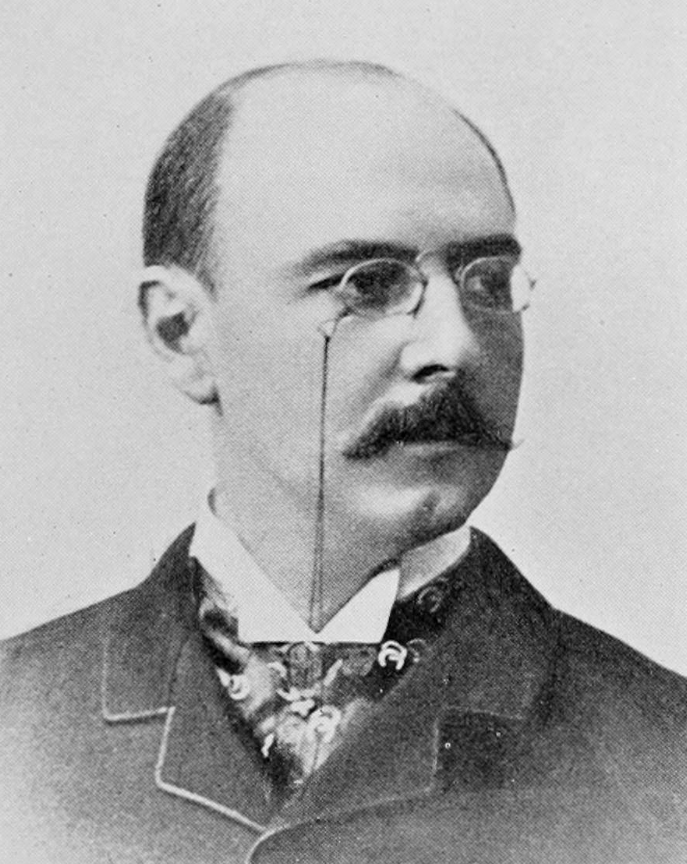

Member of the U.S. House of Representatives from Massachusetts's 11th district
- In office March 4, 1897 – March 3, 1901
- Preceded by: William F. Draper
- Succeeded by: Samuel L. Powers

Member of the Massachusetts Senate
- In office January 1895 - January 1897
- Preceded by: Francis William Kittredge
- Succeeded by: Joshua Bennett Holden
- Constituency: Ninth Suffolk District

Member of the Massachusetts House of Representatives
- In office 1891-1892

Member of the Boston Common Council
- In office 1889–1890

Personal details
- Born: June 10, 1857 Boston, Massachusetts, U.S.
- Died: January 30, 1902 (aged 44) Providence, Rhode Island, U.S.
- Resting place: Mount Auburn Cemetery
- Party: Republican
- Spouse: Mary Bryant Pratt (m. 1891)
- Education: Harvard University; Harvard Law School; Boston University (JD)
- Profession: Attorney

Charles Franklin Sprague (June 10, 1857 – January 30, 1902) was a U.S. representative from Massachusetts, grandson of Peleg Sprague (1793–1880).

== Biography ==
Born in Boston, Massachusetts, Sprague attended the public schools and was graduated from Harvard University in 1879. He studied law at Harvard Law School before completing his studies at BU Law. He was admitted to the bar in Boston.

He married Mary Bryant Pratt in November 1891.

He served as member of the Boston Common Council in 1889 and 1890, and then in the Massachusetts House of Representatives in 1891 and 1892. He chaired the board of park commissioners of the city of Boston in 1893 and 1894, and served in the Massachusetts State Senate in 1895 and 1896.

Sprague was elected as a Republican to the Fifty-fifth and Fifty-sixth Congresses (March 4, 1897 – March 3, 1901). He declined to be a candidate for renomination in 1900 to the Fifty-seventh Congress.

He died in the Butler Sanitarium in Providence, Rhode Island, on January 30, 1902, and was interred in Mount Auburn Cemetery, Watertown, Massachusetts.

U.S. House of Representatives
Preceded by William F. Draper	Member of the U.S. House of Representatives from Massachusetts's 11th congressional district March 4, 1897 – March 3, 1901	Succeeded by Samuel L. Powers
Political offices
Preceded by Francis William Kittredge	Member of the Massachusetts State Senate; Ninth Suffolk District; January, 1895–January 1897	Succeeded by Joshua Bennett Holden
