= Forestdale Cemetery =

Public cemetery in Massachusetts

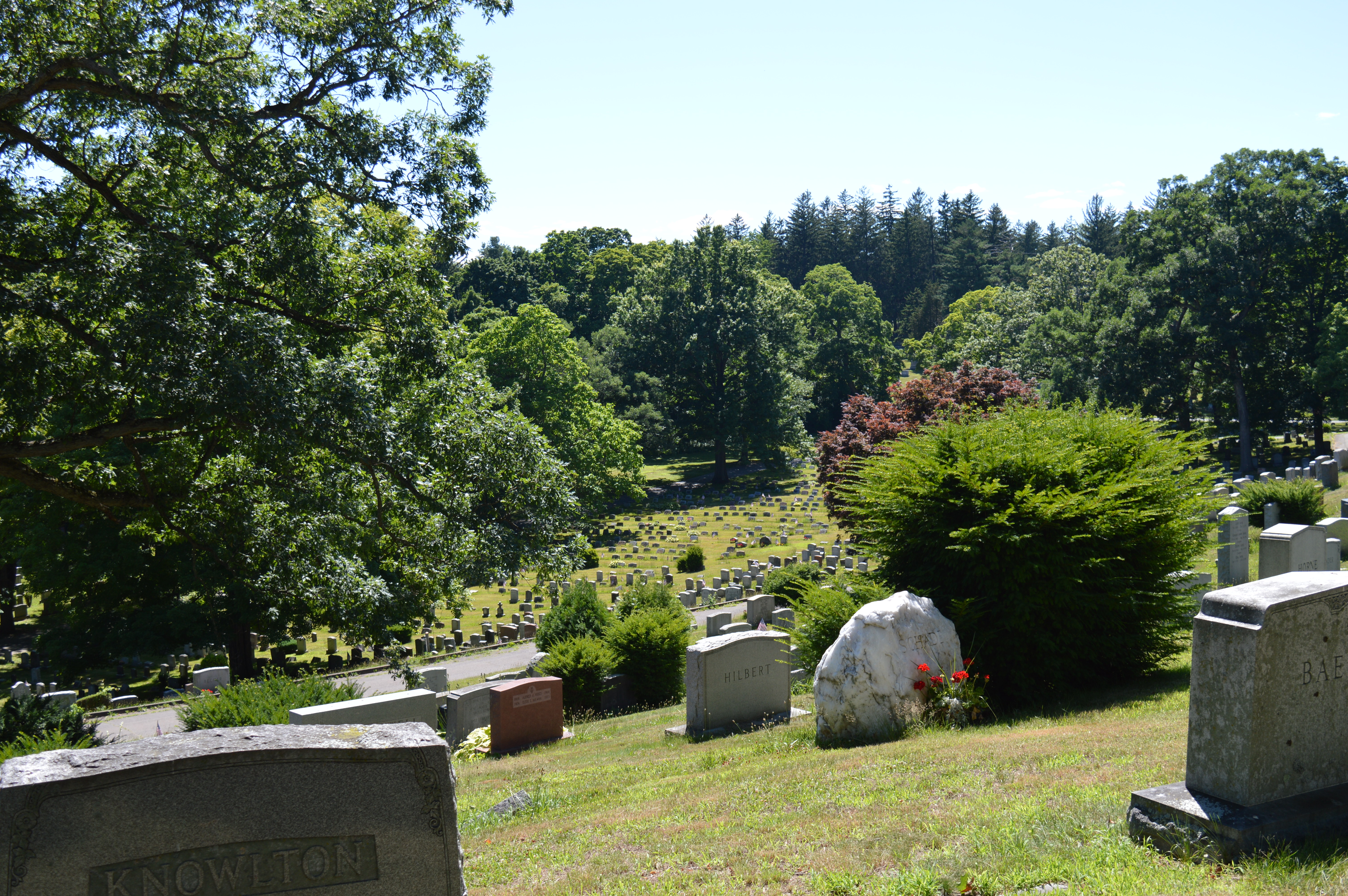
- Forestdale Cemetery, 2018
- Interactive map of Forestdale Cemetery

Details
- Established: November 1, 1860 (165 years ago)
- Location: Holyoke, Massachusetts
- Country: United States of America
- Coordinates: 42°12′30″N 72°37′24″W
- Type: Public
- Owned by: Forestdale Cemetery Association
- Size: 32 acres (13 ha)
- Find a Grave: Forestdale Cemetery
- Footnotes: GNIS feature ID 601272

Forestdale Cemetery is a public secular cemetery located in Holyoke, Massachusetts. The cemetery was officially organized on November 1, 1860, after a town meeting (Note: A city council did not exist at this time as Holyoke was not incorporated as a city until 1874) in October of that year designated a sum of $1,500 (approx. $41,000 2016 USD) for the purchase of land; contributions for this land came from the Holyoke Water Power Company as well as local mills, with the acquisitions presided over by Jones S. Davis, engineer of Lyman Mills. The cemetery acquisitions were completed and dedicated on June 22, 1862 with speeches by Amherst professor J.G. Voss and one of Holyoke's founding figures, George C. Ewing. The cemetery, built during a time of great interest in landscape architecture, contains a deliberately chosen layout of ornamental trees and shrubs.

In addition to the many founding families of Holyoke, the cemetery is the resting place of many of the city's mayors and city officials, including William Whiting II and Roswell P. Crafts. Serving as a common burial ground for all citizens, it also contains a potter's field for indigents.

== Notable burials ==
- Lettie S. Bigelow, poet and author
- Roswell P. Crafts
- William Whiting II
- Cornelius Hicks, painter

== Gallery ==
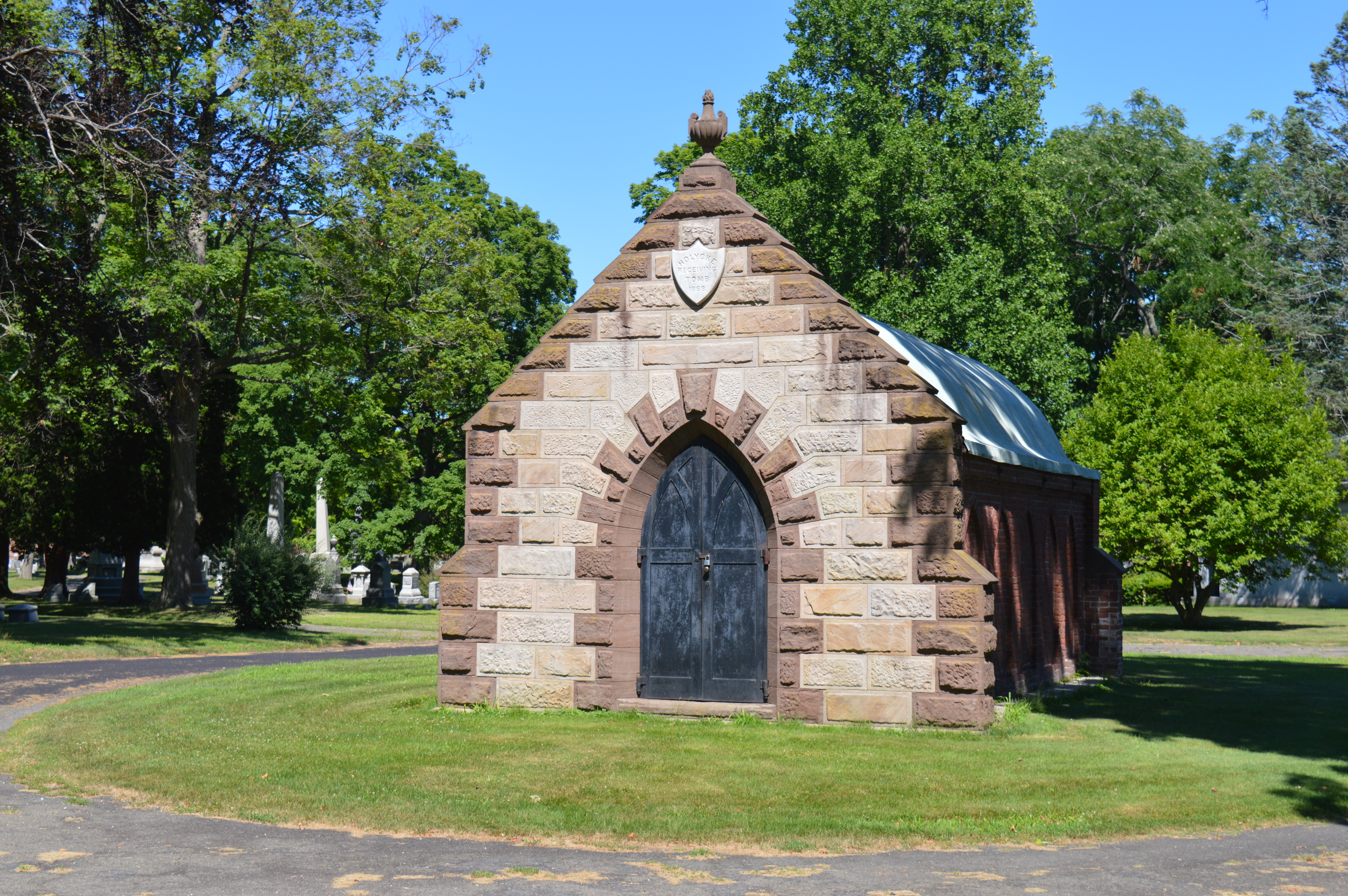
The cemetery's holding tomb, built soon after the American Civil War

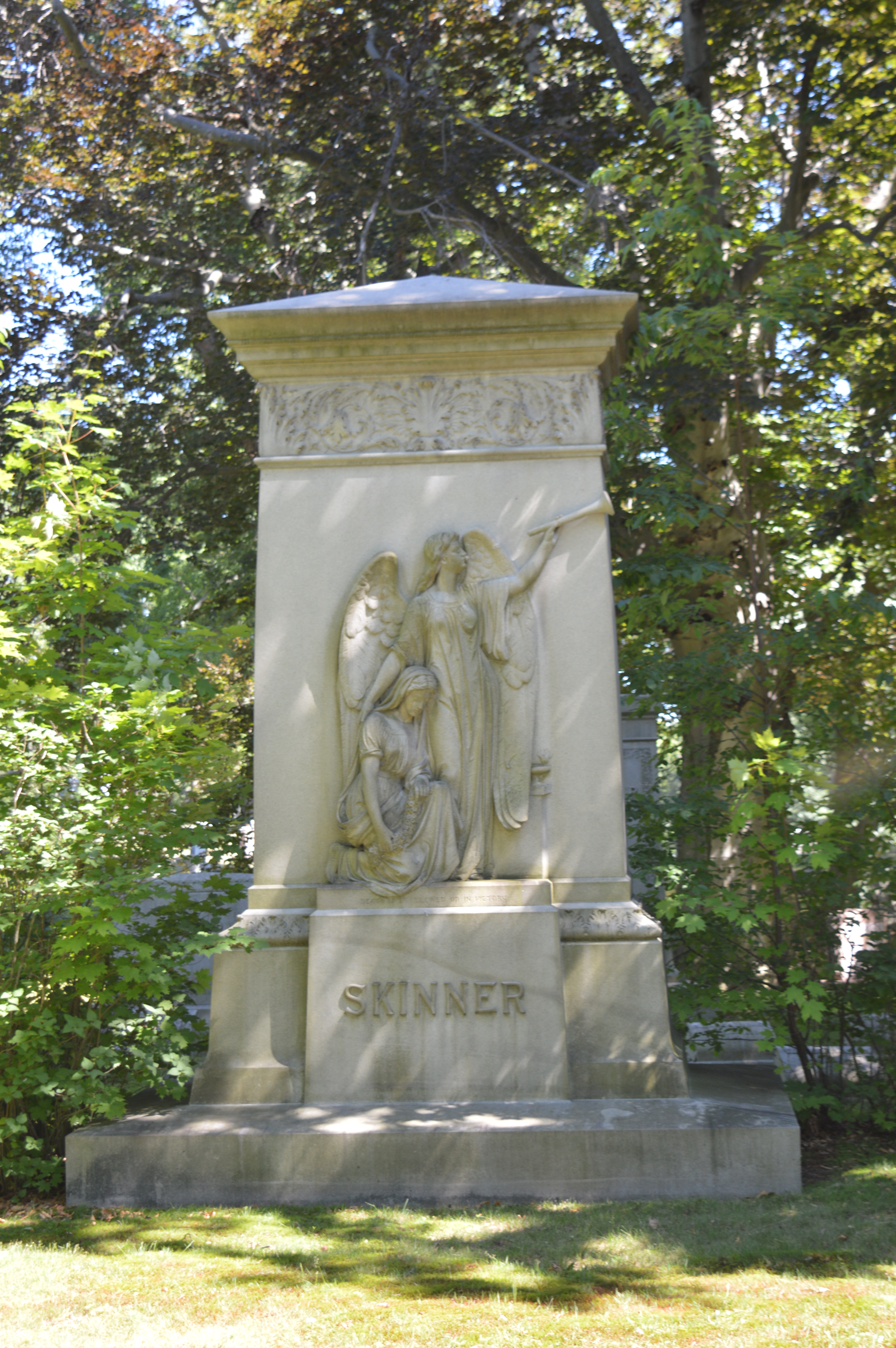
The Skinner family monument

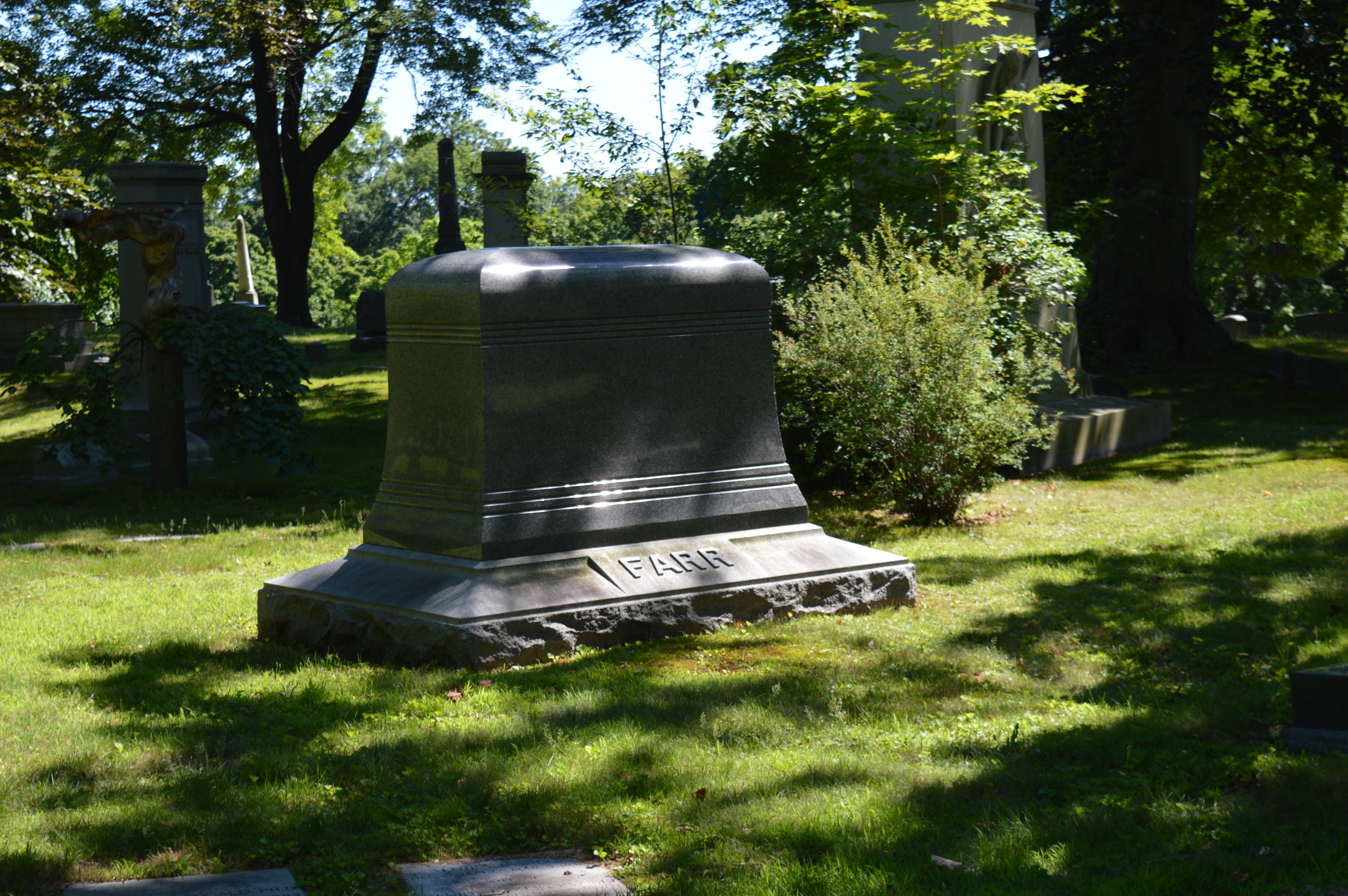
Farr family headstone

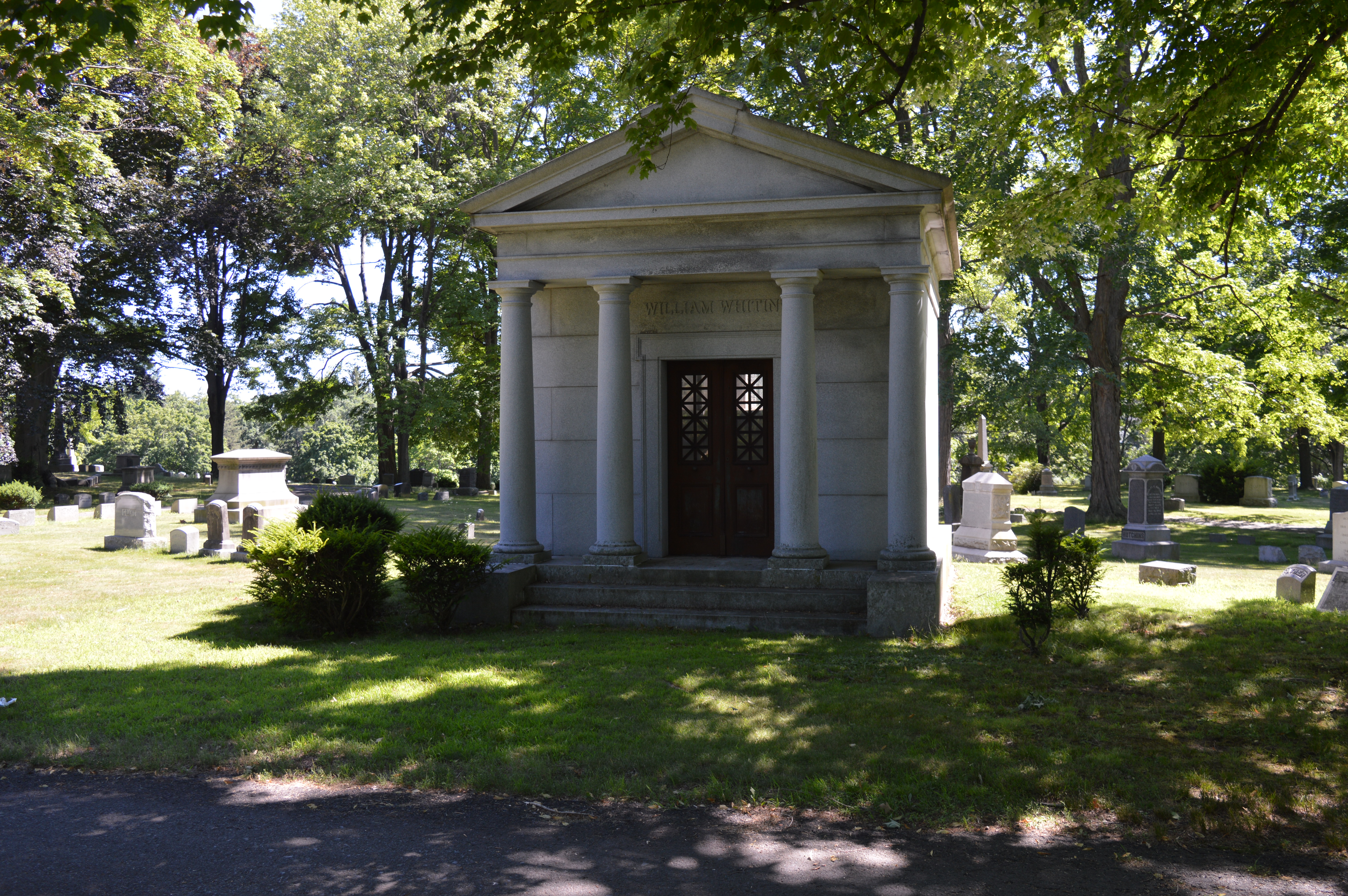
The Whiting family tomb
