= Lettie S. Bigelow =

American poet and author

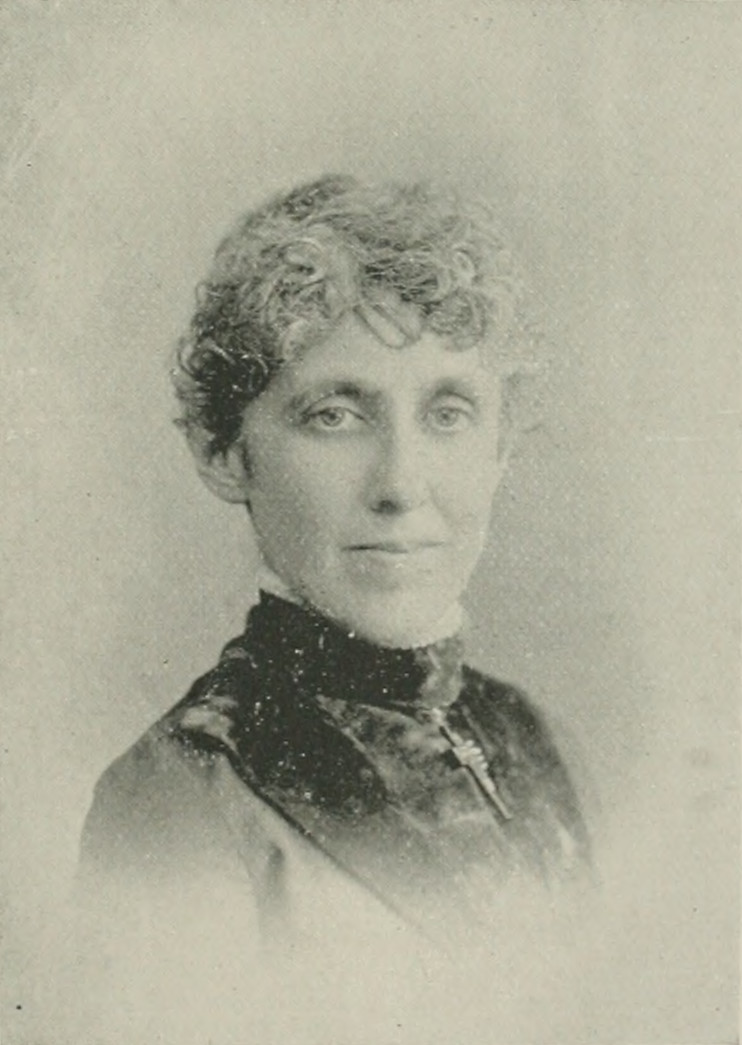
- "A Woman of the Century"
- Born: Electa Salina Bigelow; July 30, 1849; Pelham, Massachusetts, U.S.
- Died: March 1, 1906 (aged 56); Holyoke, Massachusetts, U.S.
- Resting place: Forestdale Cemetery
- Other name: Lettie
- Education: Wilbraham Wesleyan Academy
- Occupations: poet; author
- Writing career
- Pen name: "Aunt Dorothy"

Signature
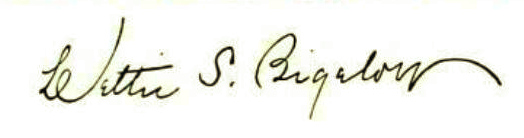

Lettie S. Bigelow (July 30, 1849 – March 1, 1906; pen name, Aunt Dorothy) was an American poet and author of the long nineteenth century. She was affiliated with the Woman's Christian Temperance Union (W.C.T.U.) in Massachusetts.

== Early life and education ==
Electa (nickname, "Lettie") Salina Bigelow was born in Pelham, Massachusetts, July 30, 1849. (Note: According to Familysearch.org, Electa was born in 1848.) She was the daughter of the Rev. Increase Briggs Bigelow (1817–1901), an itinerant minister, for more than half a century an honored member of the Methodist Episcopal Church. Her mother was Sophronia C. (Hall) Bigelow (1817–1894). Lettie was a descendant in the eighth generation of John Biglo of Watertown, Massachusetts.

Her early education was in the public schools of the cities and towns where her parents lived, as they were removed from place to place every two or three years by the decrees of the presiding bishops, according to the economy of their church. In 1866, she entered Wilbraham Wesleyan Academy, and remained a student there two years. Failing health compelled her to relinquish her course of study in that institution before the completion of the regular course, and she thereafter made her home with her parents at their various appointments.

== Career ==
Around 1889, her father left the active work of the ministry and made for himself and family a permanent home in Holyoke, Massachusetts, with Miss Bigelow living there, too, and caring for an invalid mother.

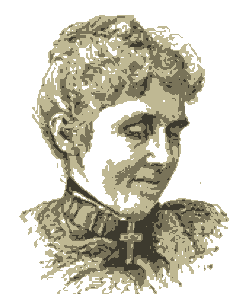
(undated)

Bigelow did considerable literary work. It is as a poet that Bigelow preferred to be known. Early on, she evinced a talent for versification, and in poetry, her intense nature found the best outlet of expression. While she did not publish a book of poems, her verses appeared quite frequently in the New York City Christian Advocate and The Independent; Boston's Zion's Herald and Independent; Wide Awake and other periodicals. Her prose writings, consisting of sketches, newspaper articles, and a serial story, were for the most part under a pseudonym. She also wrote a work of Sunday school and anniversary exercises, published in New York, which had a large sale.

She was for years closely identified with the temperance movement. A member of the W.C.T.U., in 1890, she became the editor of True Light, a monthly paper published in the interests of the Massachusetts W.C.T.U., of which her "Aunt Dorothy" letters formed a unique feature. The routine of editorial work provided irksome, and failing health compelled her to resign the position. In 1896, she was the state superintendent of the franchise department of the Massachusetts W.C.T.U.

Bigelow was a platform speaker. Her lecture on "Woman's Place and Power" was considered particularly noteworthy.

== Death ==
Lettie S. Bigelow died in Holyoke, Massachusetts, March 1, 1906 and was buried in that city's Forestdale Cemetery.

== Selected works ==
=== Poems ===
- "A Waking Song" (1885)
- "Tell Me"(1887)
- "All the World's Fair" (1893)
- "The Higher Life" (1899)
- "The Heaviest Troubles" (1899)
