= William Stedman =

American politician

Member of the U.S. House of Representatives from Massachusetts's 11th district
- In office March 4, 1803 – July 16, 1810
- Preceded by: Manasseh Cutler
- Succeeded by: Abijah Bigelow

Personal details
- Born: January 21, 1765 Cambridge, Province of Massachusetts Bay, British America
- Died: August 31, 1831 (aged 66) Newburyport, Massachusetts, U.S.
- Party: Federalist
- Education: Harvard University
- Occupation: Lawyer

William Stedman (January 21, 1765 – August 31, 1831) was a U.S. representative from Massachusetts.

Stedman was born in Cambridge in the Province of Massachusetts Bay. He graduated from Harvard University in 1784. After this he studied law. He was admitted to the bar in 1787 and practiced in Lancaster, Charlestown, and Worcester. He was appointed Justice of the Peace in 1790. He served as town clerk of Lancaster 1795-1800. He was a member of the Massachusetts House of Representatives in 1802. He served as executive chancellor of Lancaster from 1803 to 1807.

Stedman was elected as a Federalist to the Eighth Congress. He was elected from the Massachusetts's 11th congressional district. The district he represented had been drawn in the redistricting following the 1800 census. It essentially covered the area of Worcester and northward to the New Hampshire border. Stedman was reelected to three succeeding Congresses and served from March 4, 1803, until his resignation July 16, 1810. He served as clerk of Worcester County Courts 1810-1816. Stedman was elected a member of the American Antiquarian Society in 1813, and also served on its board of councilors from 1815 to 1816. Later in life moved to Newburyport, Massachusetts, where he died August 31, 1831. He was interred in Old Hill Burying Ground.

William Stedman married Almy Ellery (Feb 14, 1759 - December 25, 1839). She was a sister of Elizabeth Ellery, who married Hon. Francis Dana, and also of Lucy Ellery who married William Channing (parents of William Ellery Channing, a founder of the Unitarian Church.)

== Sources ==
- United States Congress. "William Stedman (id: S000828)". Biographical Directory of the United States Congress.

U.S. House of Representatives
Preceded by Manasseh Cutler	Member of the U.S. House of Representatives from Massachusetts's 11th congressional district 1803–1810	Succeeded by Abijah Bigelow
