= William B. C. Pearsons =

American politician

William Baron Chapin Pearsons
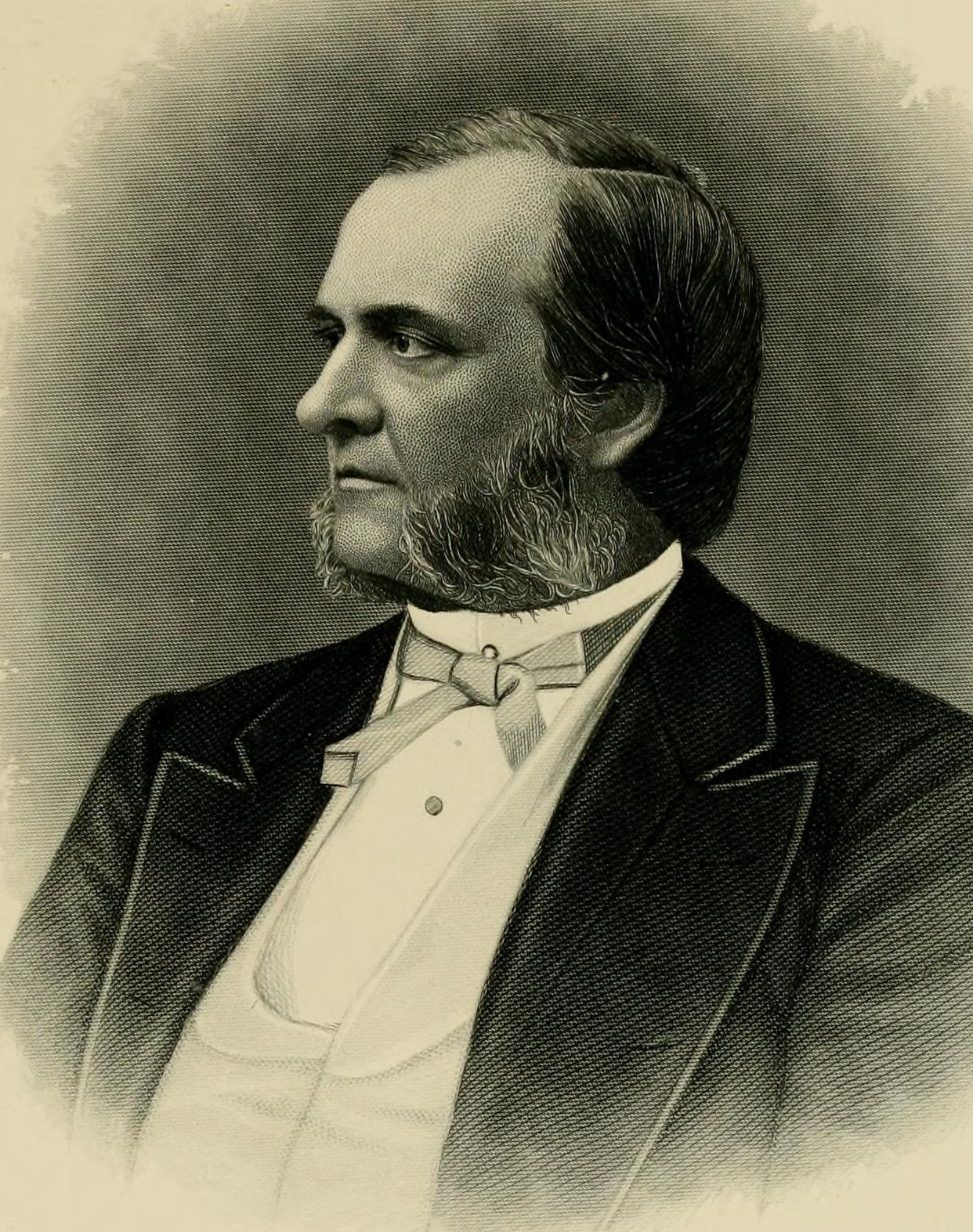
- Wood-engraving of William B. C. Pearsons, c. 1874

1st Mayor of the City of Holyoke, Massachusetts
- In office 1874–1876

Commissioner of the Holyoke Water Works
- In office 1872-1874

Member of the Massachusetts Senate
- In office 1863

Member of the Massachusetts House of Representatives
- In office 1860

Personal details
- Born: December 19, 1825 Fairlee, Vermont, US
- Died: March 3, 1898 (aged 72) Holyoke, Massachusetts, US
- Party: Republican
- Spouse: Sarah E. Taylor (m. 1857)
- Children: 3
- Education: Harvard University (LLB)

Military service
- Allegiance: Union
- Branch/service: Union Army
- Years of service: 1864–1865
- Rank: Major, Paymaster
- Commands: 13th Massachusetts Volunteer Infantry Regiment
- Battles/wars: American Civil War

William Baron Chapin Pearsons (December 19, 1824 – March 3, 1898), was an American politician, lawyer, judge, fire chief, soldier, and the first mayor of Holyoke, Massachusetts.

== Personal life ==
Pearsons was born on December 19, 1824, to parents John and Hannah (née Putnam) Pearsons, the latter being the grand-niece of American Revolution General Israel Putnam. Before he was of grade-school age his parents moved to the adjacent town of Bradford, Vermont, where he spent much of his childhood. He attended school there and upon graduation entered Harvard Law School in 1846. Graduating in the class of 1849 with a Bachelor of Laws (L.L.B.), he moved to Holyoke, Massachusetts, to open a practice and spent the entirety of his legal career operating out of that city.

In the city's founding days in 1849, Pearsons was involved in local politics as a member of fourth estate, serving as the very first editorial writer for the Hampden Freeman, wherein his first editorial he described Holyoke, then known as Ireland Parish, as– "the infant giant of western Massachusetts, in the midst of a beautiful and fertile region noted far and wide for the industry of its inhabitants, its salubrious climate, and its enchanting scenery". Pearsons remained active in Holyoke's civic life even prior to becoming a public officeholder, serving as the first secretary of Mount Tom Lodge A.F. & A.M. soon after it was chartered in 1850, and its third master in 1855.

== Political career ==
In 1859 Pearsons was elected a representative to the Massachusetts General Court, serving on the Commonwealth's joint statute committee, and in 1862 successfully won the Western Hampden district seat for the Massachusetts State Senate. In 1864 he would resign from his senatorship for an appointed position by Abraham Lincoln to serve as an additional paymaster for the Union army.

Both before and after the war, he remained active in Holyoke's public affairs. Throughout his life he served several different positions including as assessor, a sitting member of the School Committee, one of the first selectmen to the town from 1863 to 1864, a member of the first board of water commissioners, and the city's first mayor in 1874 being elected two one-year terms. He also among the first to serve as fire chief to the city, as well as a commissioner of the Holyoke Water Works and throughout his retirement from general practice after 1877, would serve as a judge in the Holyoke District Court.

Political offices
New office	Mayor of Holyoke; 1877	Succeeded by Roswell P. Crafts
