= Samuel L. Powers =

American politician

Samuel Leland Powers
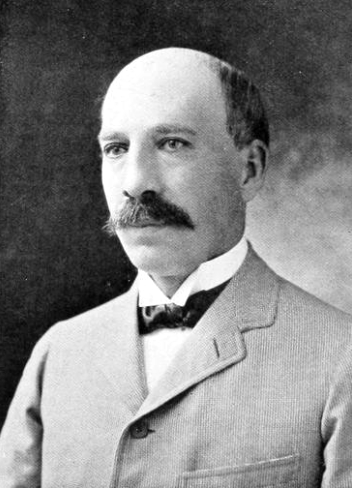

Member of the U.S. House of Representatives from Massachusetts
- In office March 4, 1901 – March 3, 1905
- Preceded by: Charles F. Sprague
- Succeeded by: John W. Weeks
- Constituency: 11th district (1901–03); 12th district (1903–05)

President of the Newton, Massachusetts City Council

Member of the Newton, Massachusetts City Council

Delegate to the 1917 Massachusetts Constitutional Convention
- In office June 6, 1917 – August 13, 1919

Personal details
- Born: October 26, 1848 Cornish, New Hampshire, U.S.
- Died: 30 November 1929 (aged 81) Newton, Massachusetts, U.S.
- Party: Republican
- Spouse: Eva C. Crowell
- Children: Leland Powers (born July 1, 1890)
- Education: Dartmouth College
- Profession: Attorney
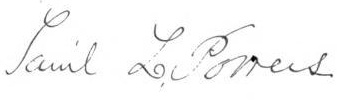
- Signature
- Image of Samuel Leland Powers from Men of Progress: One Thousand Biographical Sketches and Portraits of Leaders in Business and Professional Life in the Commonwealth of Massachusetts compl. by Richard Herndon and ed. by Edwin M. Bacon Published by New England Magazine, 1896. Page 912

Samuel Leland Powers (October 26, 1848 – November 30, 1929) was a United States representative from Massachusetts.

== Early life ==
Powers was born in Cornish, New Hampshire on October 26, 1848. He attended Kimball Union Academy and graduated from Dartmouth College in 1874. Powers studied law at the University of the City of New York Law School, and also in Worcester, Massachusetts. He was admitted to the bar in Worcester County in November, 1875 and at that time commenced practice in Boston, and moved to Newton.

== Political career ==
Powers was a member of the Newton City Council, also serving as its president. Powers was elected as a Republican to the Fifty-seventh and Fifty-eighth Congresses (March 4, 1901 – March 3, 1905). He declined to be a candidate for renomination in 1904. He served as one of the managers appointed by the House of Representatives in 1905 to conduct the impeachment trial proceedings against Charles Swayne, judge of the United States District Court for the Northern District of Florida.

He then resumed the practice of law in Boston, became a trustee of Dartmouth College 1905-1915, was a member of the Massachusetts Board of Education in 1915-1919, served in the State militia for ten years. He was a member of the Ancient and Honorable Artillery Company of Massachusetts.

In 1916 the Massachusetts legislature and electorate approved a calling of a Constitutional Convention. In May 1917, Powers was elected to serve as a member of the Massachusetts Constitutional Convention of 1917, representing the Massachusetts Thirteenth Congressional District.

Powers was a member of the University, Exchange, Newton and Atlantic Conference Clubs, among others and was the president of the Boston Art Club. and was a trustee of the board of public control for the operation of the Boston Elevated Railway 1918-1928, serving as chairman 1923-1928.

== Death ==
Powers died in Newton on November 30, 1929. His interment was in Newton Cemetery in Newton Center.

U.S. House of Representatives
Preceded by Charles F. Sprague	Member of the U.S. House of Representatives from Massachusetts's 11th congressional district March 4, 1901 – March 3, 1903	Succeeded by John Andrew Sullivan
Preceded by William C. Lovering	Member of the U.S. House of Representatives from Massachusetts's 12th congressional district March 4, 1903 – March 3, 1905	Succeeded by John W. Weeks
Political offices
Preceded by	President of the Newton, Massachusetts City Council –	Succeeded by
Preceded by	Member of the Newton, Massachusetts City Council –	Succeeded by
