= Abijah Bigelow =

American politician (1775–1860)

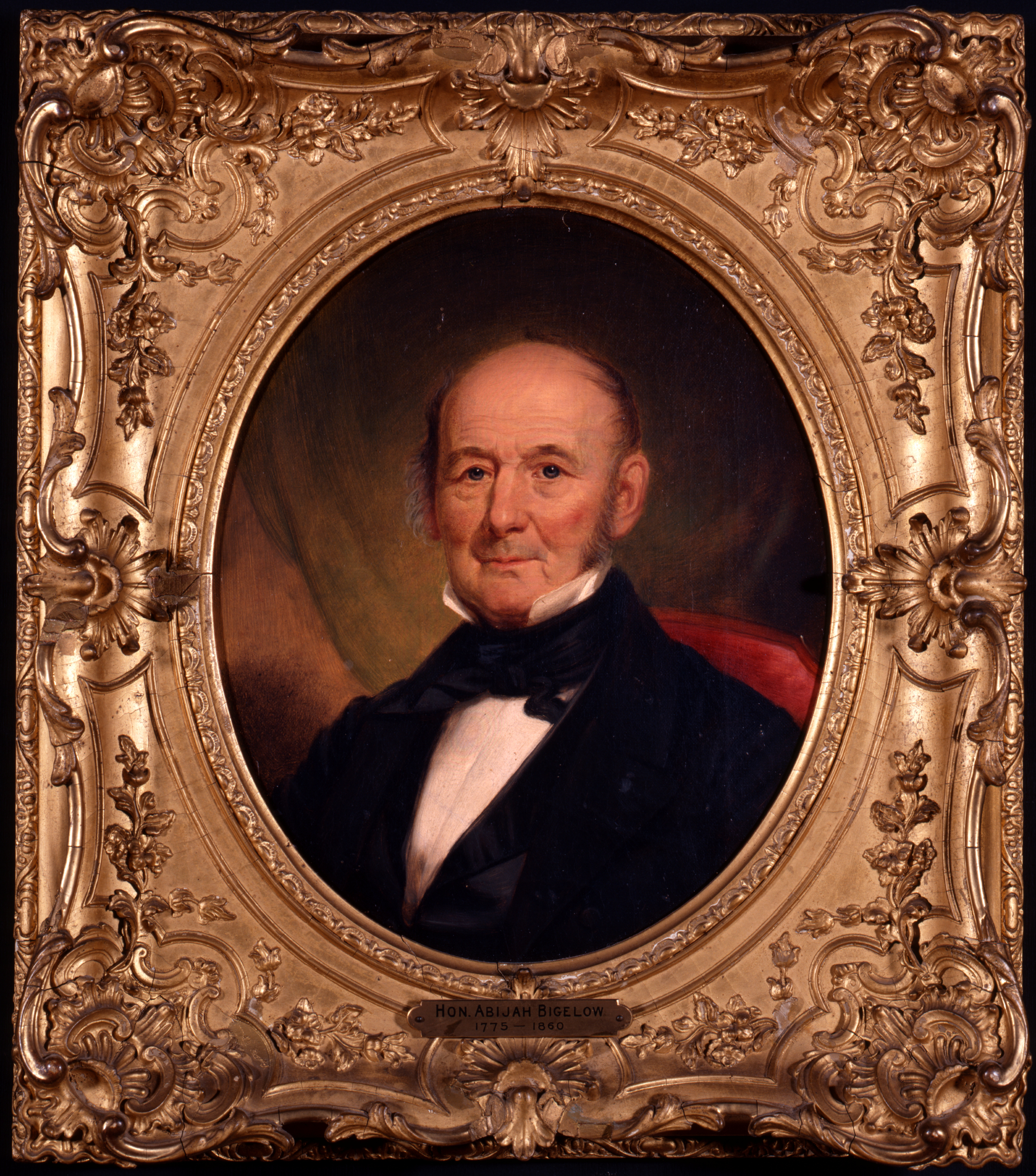
- portrait by James Sullivan Lincoln

Member of the U.S. House of Representatives from Massachusetts's 11th district
- In office October 8, 1810 – March 3, 1815
- Preceded by: William Stedman
- Succeeded by: Elijah Brigham

Member of the Massachusetts House of Representatives
- In office 1807-1809

Personal details
- Born: December 5, 1775 Westminster, Province of Massachusetts Bay, British America
- Died: April 5, 1860 (aged 84) Worcester, Massachusetts, U.S.
- Party: Federalist
- Education: Dartmouth College
- Profession: Lawyer

Abijah Bigelow (December 5, 1775 – April 5, 1860) was a U.S. representative from Massachusetts.

Born in Westminster in the Province of Massachusetts Bay, the son of Elisha and Sarah (Goodridge) Bigelow, Abijah Bigelow studied at Leicester (Massachusetts) Academy and New Ipswich Academy at New Ipswich, New Hampshire. He graduated from Dartmouth College, Hanover, New Hampshire, in 1795. He studied law in Groton, Massachusetts. He was admitted to the Worcester County bar in 1798 and commenced practice in Leominster, Massachusetts, in the same year. He was town clerk of Leominster 1803–1809. He served as member of the Massachusetts House of Representatives 1807–1809. He was a Justice of the Peace 1809-1860 and justice of the quorum 1812–1860.

Bigelow was elected as a Federalist to the Eleventh Congress to fill the vacancy caused by the resignation of William Stedman. He was reelected to the Twelfth and Thirteenth Congresses and served from October 8, 1810, to March 3, 1815. He viewed the War of 1812 in a decidedly negative light.

Bigelow moved to Worcester in 1817, and served as clerk of the courts of Worcester County 1817–1833. He resumed the practice of law, and served as trustee of Leicester Academy in 1819-1820 and as treasurer 1820–1853. He was appointed a master in chancery in 1838. He died in Worcester, Massachusetts, April 5, 1860, and was interred in the Rural Cemetery.

Bigelow was elected a member of the American Antiquarian Society in 1813, and subsequently served on its board of councilors from 1817 to 1828. The Antiquarian Society also holds a collection of manuscripts generated by Abijah and his extended family from 1785 to 1883. His correspondence with his wife Hannah Gardner Bigelow (1780–1857) while he was a congressman was also published in 1930 in volume 40 of the Proceedings of the American Antiquarian Society, with the title "The Letters of Abijah Bigelow, Member of Congress, to his Wife, 1810-1815."

Abijah and his wife Hannah had nine children, seven of whom survived their father. Hannah Bigelow's brother Francis was also a member of the U.S. House of Representatives from Massachusetts.

== Notes ==
U.S. House of Representatives
Preceded by William Stedman	Member of the U.S. House of Representatives from Massachusetts's 11th congressional district 1810–1815	Succeeded by Elijah Brigham
