= Roswell P. Crafts =

American businessman

Roswell Parsons Crafts
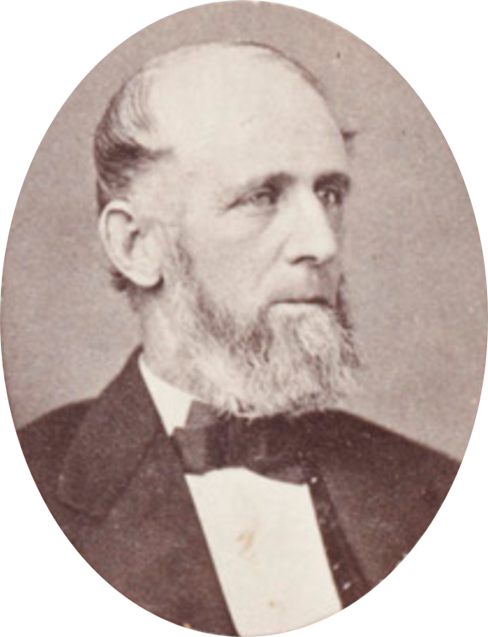

2nd and 6th Mayor of the City of Holyoke, Massachusetts
- In office 1882–1883
- Preceded by: Franklin P. Goodall
- Succeeded by: James E. Delaney
- In office 1877
- Preceded by: William B. C. Pearsons
- Succeeded by: William Whiting II

Member of the Massachusetts House of Representatives
- In office 1872

Chief of the Holyoke Fire Department
- In office 1868–1869, 1871

Personal details
- Born: September 17, 1822 Whately, Massachusetts
- Died: September 3, 1904 (aged 81) Holyoke, Massachusetts
- Resting place: Forestdale Cemetery; Holyoke, Massachusetts
- Party: Democratic
- Spouse(s): Delia Charlotte Jones (m. 1843)
- Children: 1 Pliny Jones Crafts (1844–1886)

Roswell Parsons Crafts (September 17, 1822 – September 3, 1904) was an American businessman, politician, fire chief, and the second and sixth mayor of Holyoke, Massachusetts. Born in Whately, Massachusetts, to Chester and Phila (née Jewett) Crafts, he arrived in Holyoke at age 11, and after attending school began his first business driving a stagecoach between Springfield and Northampton carrying mail and passengers. At the age of 20 he helped his brother, Chester, open a general store under the name Chester Crafts & Co. In 1843 he married Ms. Delia Jones of Ireland Parish; the couple bore one son, Pliny Jones Chester on February 9, 1845.

This same year he left his brother's venture to open his own store on High Street. By 1866 he had made his son a business partner, operating under the name R.P. Crafts & Son. In 1870 his store's building and its contents burned to the ground, prompting him to construct the Caledonia Building in 1874. Prior to this he had served as the city's fire chief from 1868 to 1869, and following his own store's fire served for one more year in 1871.

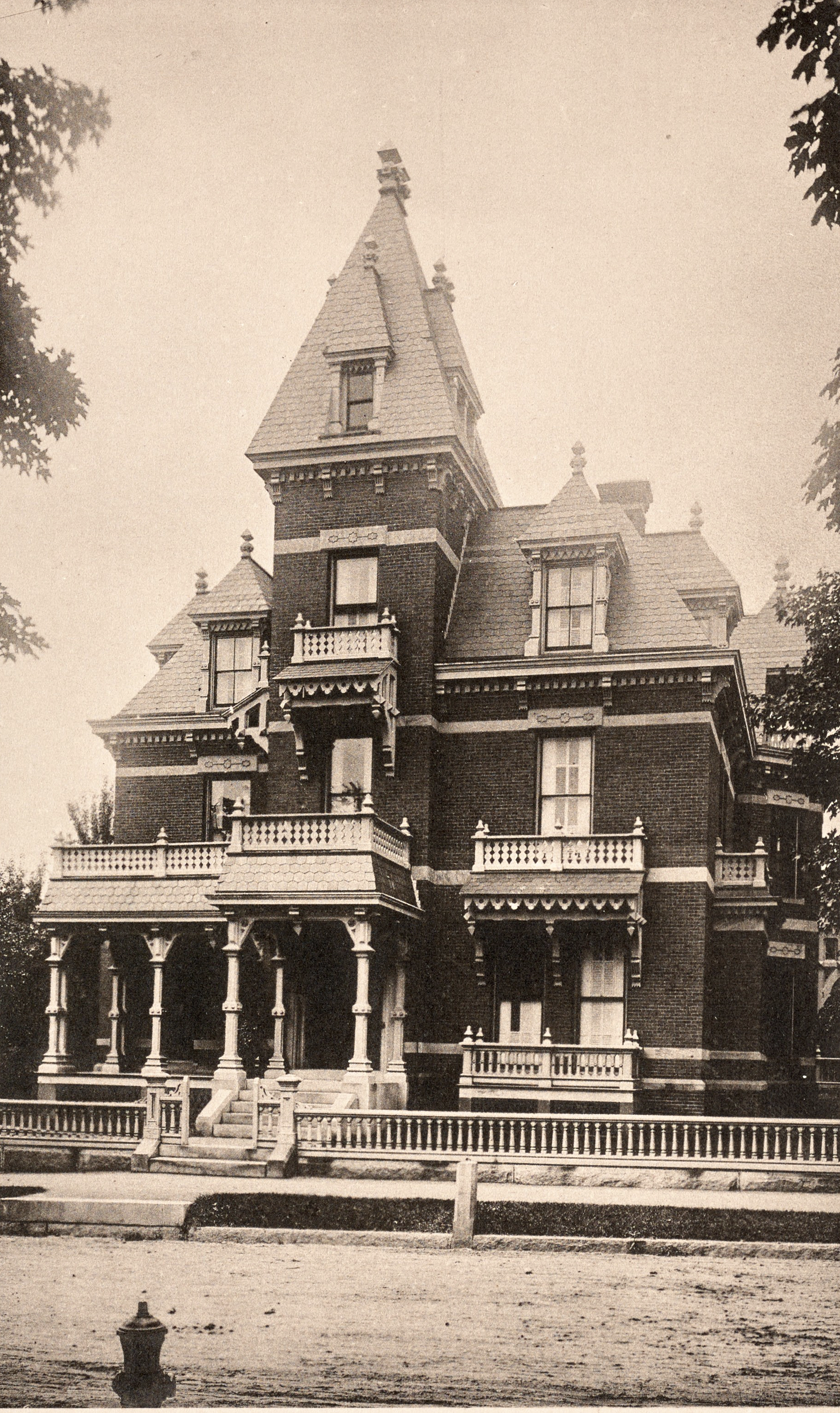
The R.P. Crafts house, c. 1891

Ever present in the political landscape of the town, he ran successfully for a representative seat for the Massachusetts Legislature in 1872. When Holyoke was incorporated as a city in 1873, Crafts ran for mayor against William B. C. Pearsons that Fall; local historian George H. Allyn later recalled–

the recriminations of [1912] are weak and feeble compared with what passed between the advocates of W. B. C. Pearsons and R. P. Crafts. When Pearsons was elected by a majority of sixty-two the Transcript came out with a cut of the most exultant, arrogant, loud-throated rooster that it was ever our fortune to gaze upon. He was re-elected, and then R. P. Crafts was given a turn ...

Losing the first mayoral election, Crafts subsequently ran successfully in 1876 as well as 1881 and 1882 for 3 one-year terms. During his time as mayor, the city opened its first paved roads.

By the end of his life, Crafts had held several properties in the city, as well as a stake in the Bemis Paper Company. He died at his residence in Holyoke on September 3, 1904, from kidney failure, and was interred in Forestdale Cemetery.

== See also ==
- 1872 Massachusetts legislature

== Notes ==
Political offices
Preceded by William B. C. Pearsons	Mayor of Holyoke; 1877	Succeeded by William Whiting II
Preceded by Franklin P. Goodall	Mayor of Holyoke; 1882–1883	Succeeded by James E. Delaney
