= Holyoke Medical Center =

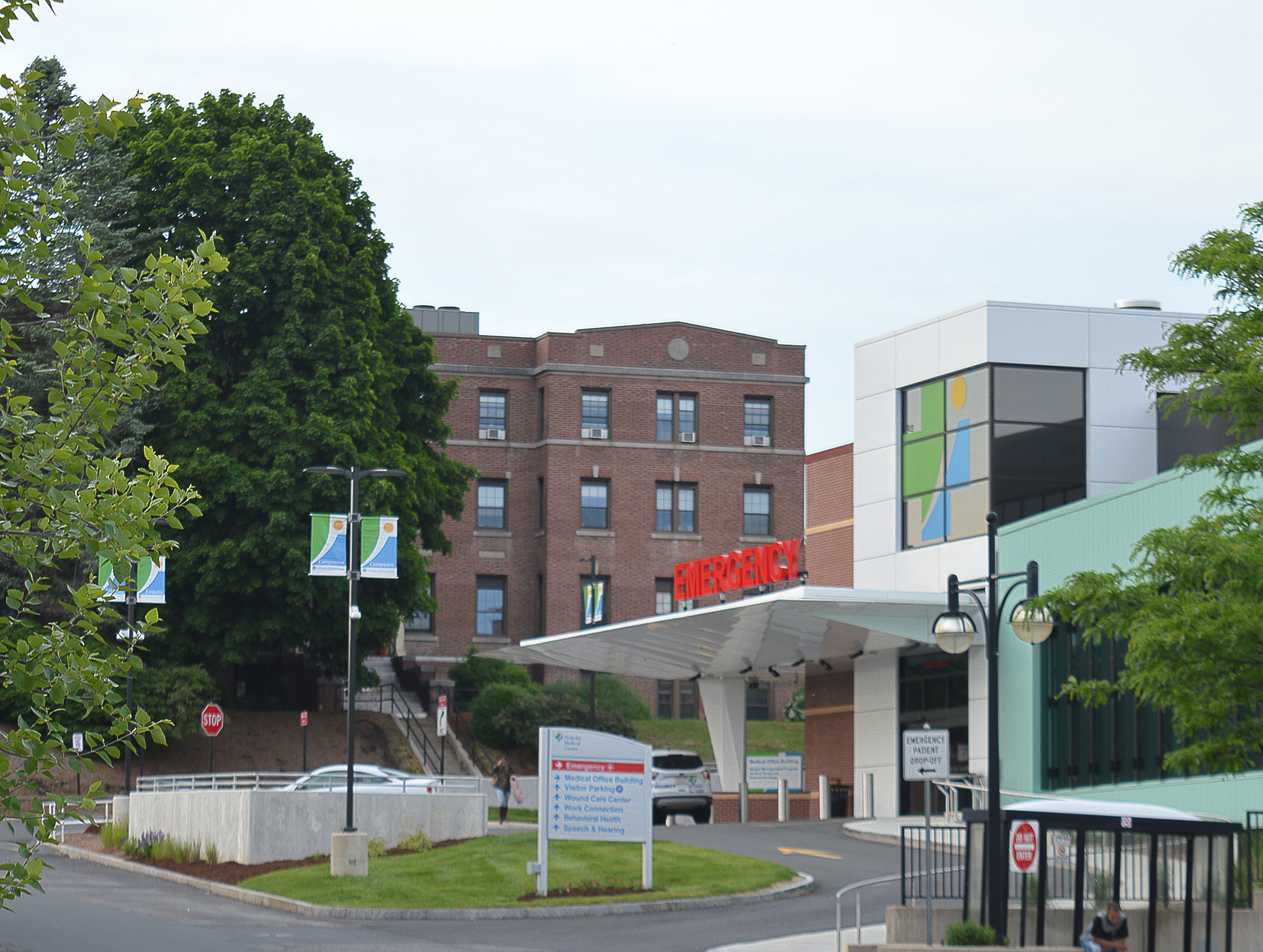
- Emergency department of Holyoke Medical Center

- Location within Massachusetts Location within the United States

Geography
- Location: 15 Hospital Drive, Holyoke, Massachusetts, United States
- Coordinates: 42.199593°N 72.62851°W

Organization
- Care system: Private
- Type: Community
- Network: Valley Health Systems

Services
- Beds: 198

History
- Founded: May 23, 1891 (chartered); June 10, 1893 (opened)

Links
- Website: www.holyokehealth.com
- Lists: Hospitals in Massachusetts

Holyoke Medical Center, formerly known as Holyoke City Hospital, is a full-service, community and regional non-profit medical center located in Holyoke, Massachusetts. Holyoke Medical has 198 beds in the main hospital and runs a comprehensive healthcare system that includes the VNA, River Valley Counseling Center and Western Mass Physician Associates, a physician practice group. The service area for hospital covers Greater Holyoke area, with towns in both Hampshire and Hampden County including Holyoke, Chicopee, South Hadley, Granby, Easthampton, Southampton, West Springfield, and Belchertown.

== History ==
In April 1891, a meeting of city civic leaders was held at the residence of William Whiting to discuss need for a modern hospital in Holyoke. Plans were drawn up for a donor subscription fund managed by Catherine Turner and Anna Fairfield Whiting, wives of Edward Taft and Whiting respectively; their largest contributor would be silk-magnate William Skinner, who would subsequently serve as president of the board of directors. By May 23, 1891, the Holyoke City Hospital was established, opening its doors in on June 10, 1893. From 1893 until 1977 the hospital was also home to the Holyoke Hospital School of Nursing.

== Services provided ==
Holyoke Medical has 171 physicians on the active medical staff and an additional 96 courtesy or consulting physicians, patients receive care in multiple specialties.

Holyoke Medical opened a new $25.3 million emergency center in June 2017. This group will provide a new crisis center for psychiatric services, 40 treatment areas, and advanced lifesaving equipment.
