= Cornelius Hicks =

American painter

Cornelius Grover Hicks (February 9, 1898 – September 13, 1930) was an American painter.

== Biography ==
Cornelius was born in Massachusetts and was the first child of Job and Marilla Hicks to reach adulthood. He was a student at Pratt Institute and showed tremendous talent in the field of art. In the 1920s, he painted two posters for the American Red Cross. He illustrated for several magazines, including Collier's Weekly.

Cornelius married Verna Bauer in 1927 but had no children. He died in 1930 of Tuberculosis at the age of 32 at his parents' home in Holyoke. Some of his paintings were passed on to family members, and a few of his works are still owned by relatives of his.
