= William F. Whiting =

American politician

William Whiting
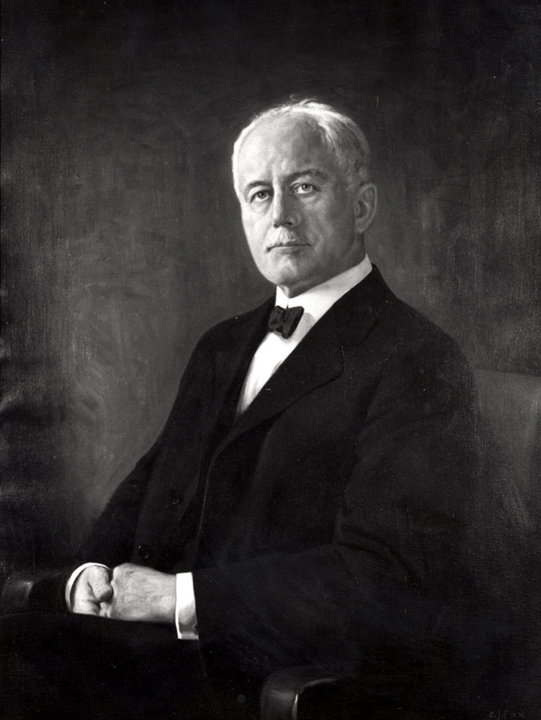

4th United States Secretary of Commerce
- In office August 22, 1928 – March 4, 1929
- President: Calvin Coolidge
- Preceded by: Herbert Hoover
- Succeeded by: Robert P. Lamont

Personal details
- Born: William Fairfield Whiting; July 20, 1864 Holyoke, Massachusetts, U.S.
- Died: August 31, 1936 (aged 72) Holyoke, Massachusetts, U.S.
- Party: Republican
- Spouse: Anne Chapin
- Children: 4
- Relatives: William Whiting (father)
- Education: Amherst College (BA)
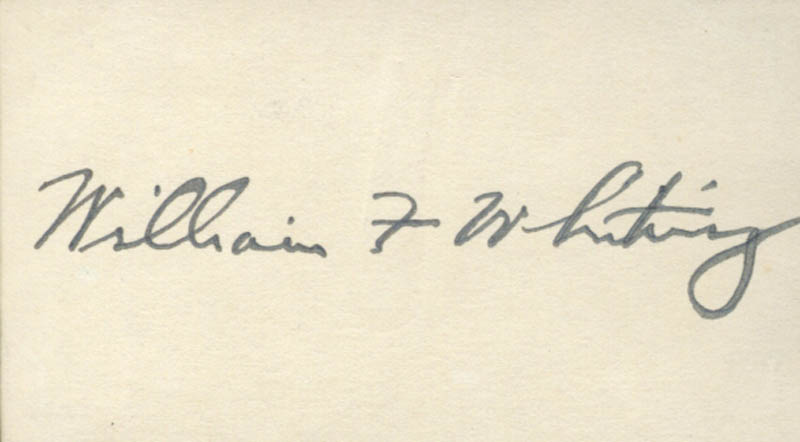
- Signature

William Fairfield Whiting (July 20, 1864 – August 31, 1936) was United States secretary of commerce from August 22, 1928, to March 4, 1929, during the last months of the administration of Calvin Coolidge.

== Early life and career ==
Whiting was born on July 20, 1864, in Holyoke, Massachusetts. He was the son of William Whiting II, a politician and businessman, and Anna Morgan (née Fairfield). He attended Amherst College and graduated in the class of 1896 alongside future Secretary of State Robert Lansing.

When Whiting's father, who organized the Whiting Paper Company, became president of that business, William Fairfield Whiting became treasurer. When his father died, Whiting became president of the Whiting Paper Company and his brother Samuel Raynor Whiting became treasurer. He became a lifelong friend of future President Coolidge when Coolidge was mayor of Northampton, Massachusetts. Later, Whiting and Frank Stearns were the first two "Coolidge Men" who advocated their friend as a serious presidential candidate. At the 1920 Republican National Convention, Whiting voted for Coolidge for president on every ballot, the sole delegate to do so after Warren G. Harding had sewed up the votes to win the nomination.

After the 1928 Republican National Convention, Herbert Hoover resigned as Secretary of Commerce to focus on winning the presidential election. President Coolidge's appointment of Whiting as Hoover's successor surprised the Washington establishment. The position was predicted to go to Hoover's preferred candidate, Dr. Julius Klein, the director of the Bureau of Foreign and Domestic Commerce and Klein did not get the position when Hoover became president. Former Senator William Butler of Massachusetts turned down the post before Coolidge offered it to Whiting. His appointment was confirmed by the United States Senate on December 11, 1928.

During his first press interview after his appointment, Whiting stated, "My policies will be Mr. Hoover's policies." As secretary, he headed President Coolidge's delegation to the International Conference on Civil Aeronautics.

== Personal life ==
Whiting married the former Anne H. Chapin, daughter of Judge Edward Whitman Chapin, on October 19, 1892. The couple had four children: William Whiting, Edward Chapin Whiting, Fairfield Whiting and Ruth Whiting Fowler. Like his father, Whiting gained a reputation for raising Jersey cattle and poultry.

He died of a long illness at his Holyoke home on August 31, 1936. He is interred in Forestdale Cemetery in Holyoke along with his parents.

Political offices
Preceded by Herbert Hoover	U.S. Secretary of Commerce; Served under: Calvin Coolidge; August 22, 1928 – March 4, 1929	Succeeded by Robert P. Lamont
