= William Whiting II =

American politician

William Whiting
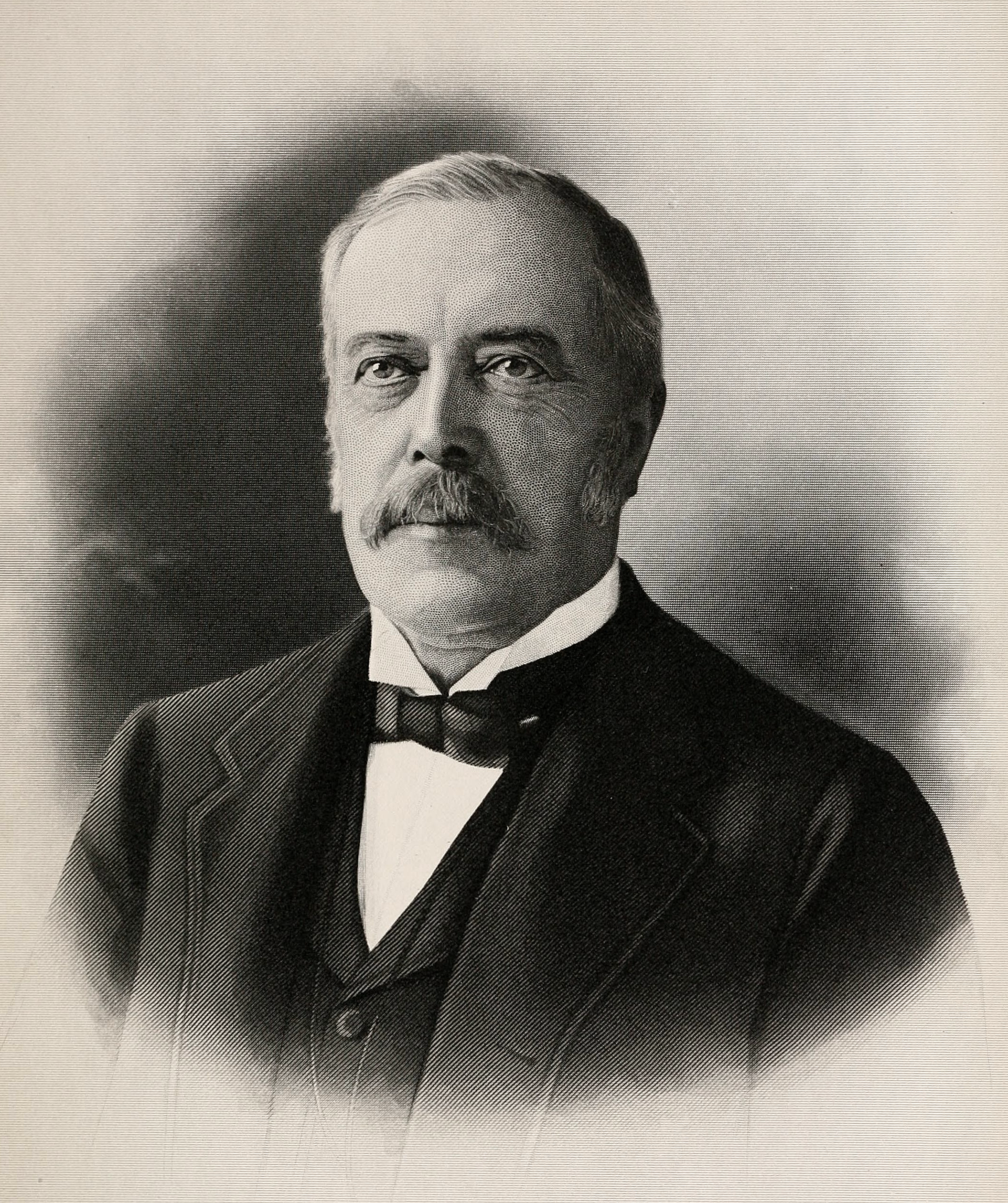

Member of the U.S. House of Representatives from Massachusetts's 11th district
- In office March 4, 1883 – March 3, 1889
- Preceded by: George D. Robinson
- Succeeded by: Rodney Wallace

3rd Mayor of Holyoke
- In office 1878–1879
- Preceded by: Roswell P. Crafts
- Succeeded by: William Ruddy

Personal details
- Born: May 24, 1841 Dudley, Massachusetts, U.S.
- Died: January 9, 1911 (aged 69) Holyoke, Massachusetts, U.S.
- Resting place: Forestdale Cemetery
- Party: Republican
- Spouse: Anna Fairfield
- Children: 2, including William
- Education: Amherst College (BA)

William Whiting (May 24, 1841 – January 9, 1911) was an American businessman and politician from Holyoke, Massachusetts. Whiting descended from an English family who first settled in Lynn, Massachusetts, during 1636.

Whiting was born in Dudley, Massachusetts, May 24, 1841. Whiting attended public schools and graduated from Amherst College.

Whiting worked for the Holyoke Paper Company and the Hampden Paper Company. At the age of 17 Whiting started at the Holyoke Paper Company working first as a bookkeeper. After three years working as a clerk, Whiting became a salesman first working out of the company's main office and later working as a commercial traveling salesman. Whiting organized the Whiting Paper Company in Holyoke, Massachusetts, in 1865. In 1865, Whiting built his first mill followed by another in 1872. When the Whiting Paper Company was first formed. L.L. Brown of South Adams, Massachusetts, was president and Whiting was agent and treasurer. Whiting later became president and his son, William Fairfield Whiting, became treasurer. Whiting later organized the Collins Paper Company and built a paper mill in North Wilbraham, Massachusetts.

In addition to his political and manufacturing careers, Whiting was a prominent philanthropist in Holyoke's history, and endowed the city with many of its secular institutions. In 1870 along with John and Edwin Chase, Whiting incorporated the Holyoke Public Library, serving as its first president. During his mayoralty Whiting privately funded the construction of the Holyoke Opera House, a venue which once hosted a wide variety of renowned Vaudeville and musical acts, as well as early motion pictures. In 1893 he led the efforts to found the Holyoke Medical Center, then known as Holyoke City Hospital, as the first non-sectarian medical institution in the city. Being a member of the Mount Tom Lodge of freemasons, his work in philanthropy was held in such regard that he would go on to have the city's second lodge named after him in 1909, an unusual honor as freemasons rarely name lodges after living persons. Following a period of declining membership and poor bookkeeping the William Whiting Lodge however had its charter suspended in 1997.

== Political career ==
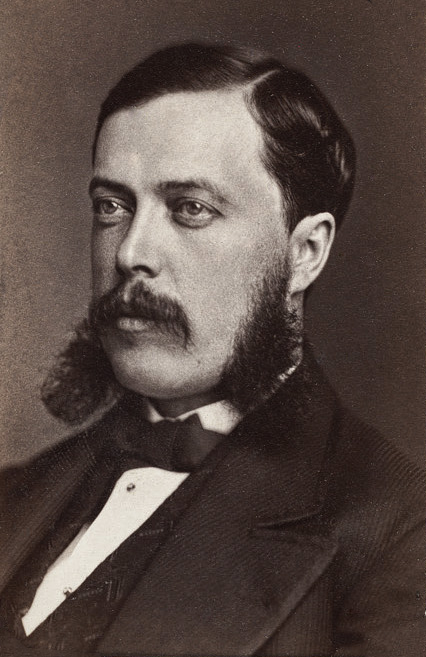
Whiting during his tenure as a state senator, 1873; a variant of Whiting Paper's acorn logo, evoking the namesake etymology of his hometown, the Holyoke surname deriving from "holy oak"

Whiting was a member of the Massachusetts Senate in 1873; city treasurer of Holyoke in 1876 and 1877; and mayor of Holyoke in 1878 and 1879. While Holyoke's mayoral elections are officially nonpartisan, drawing support from the business community and Holyoke's residents at large, Whiting enjoyed backing of both major political parties during his mayoral election. He would go on to serve as delegate to the Republican National Convention in 1876 and 1896; elected as a Republican to the Forty-eighth, Forty-ninth, and Fiftieth Congresses (March 4, 1883 – March 3, 1889).

== After politics ==
Whiting was not a candidate for renomination in 1888. He was a commissioner to the Exposition Universelle in Paris, France, in 1900, and resumed his former manufacturing pursuits.

Whiting died in Holyoke on January 9, 1911, and was interred in Forestdale Cemetery in Holyoke.

== Family ==
William Whiting's son William F. Whiting was a close friend and adviser to President Calvin Coolidge. Serving for a time as United States Secretary of Commerce.

== Legacy ==
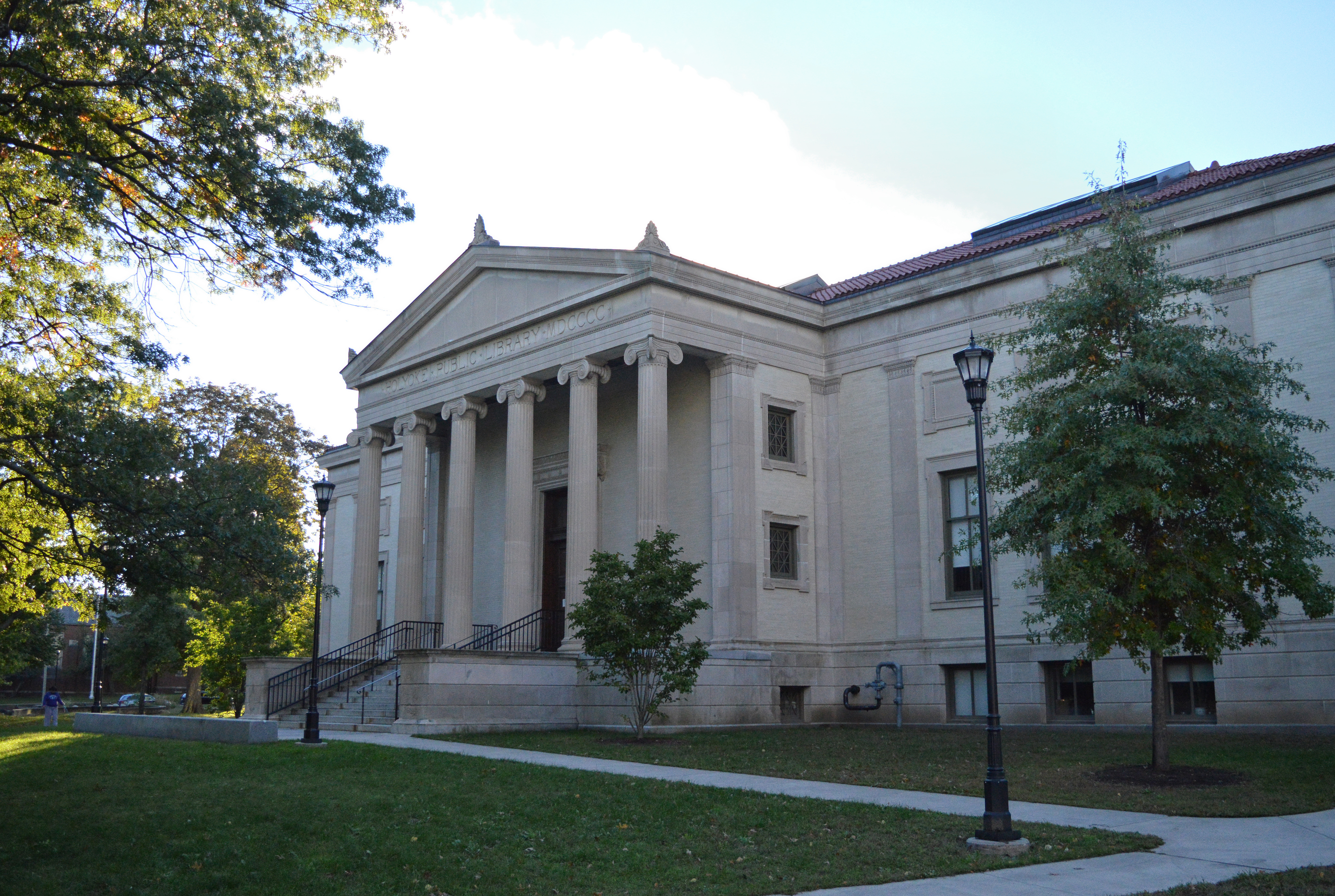
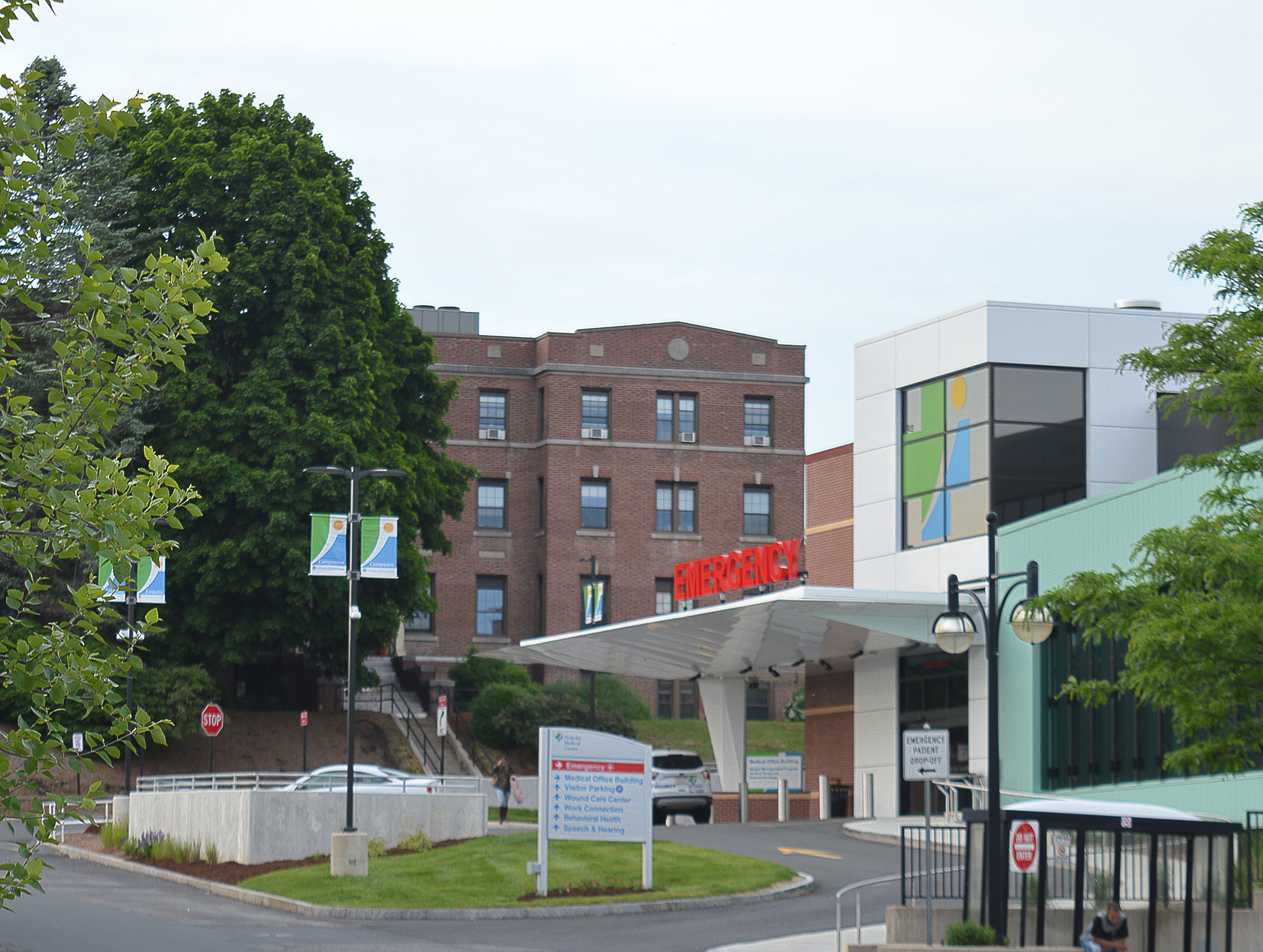
The Holyoke Public Library (left), and Holyoke Medical Center (right), both institutions that Whiting, his wife Anna Fairfield, and associates directly had a role in establishing

Many of the institutions which Whiting established or cultivated during his life continue to play a significant in Holyoke today. Most notably these include the Holyoke Medical Center, and the city's public library. Whiting, an alumnus of Holyoke Public Schools would have one named after him on Chestnut Street, which has since been converted to apartments. He also served as a vice president of the Holyoke and Westfield Railroad, predecessor of the Pioneer Valley Railroad which maintains freight services in the region. His former summer home and cattle farm today bears his name as the Whiting Farms neighborhood of Holyoke.

== See also ==
- 1873 Massachusetts legislature

== Notes ==
Political offices
Preceded by George D. Robinson	Member of the U.S. House of Representatives from Massachusetts's 11th congressional district 1883–1889	Succeeded by Rodney Wallace
Preceded by Roswell P. Crafts	Mayor of Holyoke; 1878–1879	Succeeded by William Ruddy
