= List of mills in Holyoke, Massachusetts =

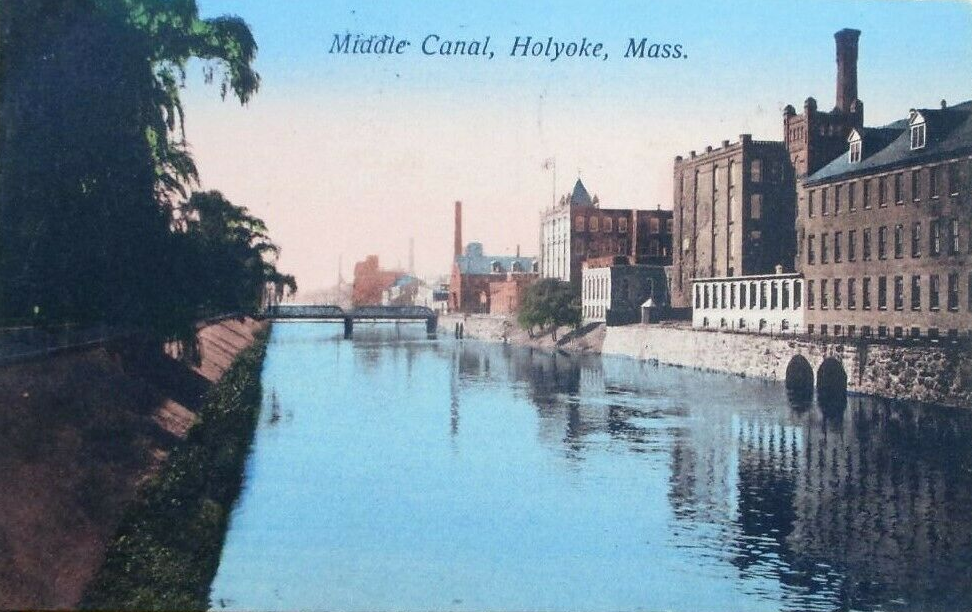
Mills lining the canals in the early 20th century

When it was first established under the guise of the Hadley Falls Company, the city of Holyoke, Massachusetts was conceived as a production center for textiles. Despite protests of the company during the formation of the Parsons Paper Company, that a pulp and paper venture was a poor use of space and unprofitable, by 1885 the city was the largest producer of paper goods in the United States. Before 1920 the city was the home to numerous paper mills, producing 80% of the writing paper used in the United States, as well as having the largest silk, and alpaca wool mills in the world. The city was also home to the largest paper millwright firm in the United States, D. H. & A. B. Tower, which would design at least 25 such mills in Holyoke alone. While many were lost to fire, redevelopment, and salvaging, today a number of mills have been redeveloped. Despite determinations of eligibility by the Massachusetts Historical Commission as part of the Holyoke Canal System, as of 2026, no mill properties in the city had been listed on the National Register of Historic Places.

== Extant ==
| | Name | Image | Built | Location | NRHP Listing | Notes/Use |
|---|---|---|---|---|---|---|
| 1 | American Pad and Paper | | | 88 Winter Street | | First standalone factory of Ampad. |
| 2 | Beebe & Holbrook Mills | | c. 1871 | 380 Dwight Street | | Designed by Ashley B. Tower. Partially razed by fire, power turbine house still operates for Holyoke Gas & Electric. Most recently occupied by The Canal Gallery. |
| 3 | Berkshire Fine Spinning Associates Mill No. 4 | | 1923 | 63 Jackson Street | | Initially constructed as a cotton warp processing mill for Farr Alpaca, designed by Samuel M. Green Co. Bought by Berkshire Fine Spinning Associates in 1939, subsequently Berkshire Hathaway, and later used by American Pad and Paper in 1980s. |
| 4 | Buchanan & Bolt Building/Holyoke Wire Works | | c. 1901 | 60 Appleton Street | | Wire drawing and weaving factory, later used by Sinclair Co. Wire Cloth, today occupied by Russell-Zuhl Petrified Wood. |
| 5 | Chemical Paper Manufacturing Company | | 1880 | 210–240 South Water Street | | Produced fine writing paper, funded by Newton Brothers, design by D. H. & A. B. Tower. Present-day manufacturing plant of Hazen Paper Company. |
| 6 | Clinton Silk Mill | | c. 1865 | 58 North Canal Street | | Part of the American Thread Company, later used by Clinton Silk Mills after 1933, produced silk goods for the Allies during World War II, looms sold to Bedford Weaving in Virginia. Building used by Hadley Printing since 1976. |
| 7 | Crocker-McElwain Paper No. 1 | | c. 1885 | 102 Cabot Street | | Originally the Holyoke Water Power Company Building, constructed for start-up companies, massive fire in 1890, towers since-removed. Produced fine writing paper, became part of American Writing Paper Company system. Was also music plant of Thaddeus Cahill's telharmonium. Part of present-day manufacturing plant of FLN-Mar Rubber & Plastics. |
| 8 | D. MacKintosh & Sons/The Wherehouse | | | 109 Lyman Street | | Originally a cotton mill, it was later used as a factory by Jim Prentice and The Electric Game Company. Today used by The Wherehouse and partially extant section for shops/storage. |
| 9 | Eureka Blank Book | | 1890, 1910 | 108–110 Winter Street | | 110 Winter Street built in 1890, expanded into 108 Winter in 1910. Used by a builder, now known as Eureka Lab Book, until 2017; presently owned by a holding company. |
| 10 | Farr Alpaca Company Building #7 | | c. 1915 | 101 Cabot Street | | Converted to condominiums, circa 1988. |
| 11 | Farr Alpaca Company Building #8 | | c. 1915 | 108 Cabot Street | | Contains Winter Palace Theatre and Ballroom; top floor occupied by the presently-defunct Paper City Brewery. |
| 12 | Franklin Paper Mill | | c. 1867 | 150 Middle Water Street | | Originally a Newton Bros. development, now home to United Paper Box (Uni-Pac). |
| 13 | General Electric Building | | c. 1930 | 60 Jackson Street | | Initially developed by Farr Alpaca as a mill and offices (unknown building number), and retail shop. Acquired by General Electric as wire production line after 1939 liquidation, Northeast Wire by 1966, presently used by G & G Restaurant Equipment. |
| 14 | George R. Dickinson Company | | 1882 | 81 Sargeant Street | | Design by D. H. & A. B. Tower. Part of present-day manufacturing plant of FLN-Mar Rubber & Plastics. |
| 15 | Goetz Silk Mill | | 1911, 1919 | 642 South Summer Street | | Built by Casper Ranger Construction Co., announced in 1909, delays from carpenters strike; expansion engineered by Charles T. Main. Original building adjacent to Jackson Street, expansion adjacent to South Summer. Today used by Valley Green, Inc., a seed company. |
| 16 | Hadley Thread Company Mills | | 1863 | 56 Canal Street | | Part of the American Thread Company, later used by Graham Manufacturing, Conklin Office Furniture; purchased in June 2019 by Trulieve Cannabis Corporation. |
| 17 | Hampden Glazed Paper and Card Company | | 1882 | 100 Water Street | | Design by D. H. & A. B. Tower, was last Holyoke mill still in use by the founding business, the Hampden Paper Company, until September 2020. |
| 18 | Japanese Tissue Mills/Perkins Mill | | c. 1899 | 12 Crescent Street | | Founded by the B. F. Perkins Company in 1899 as Japanese Tissue Mills. Later known as the American Tissue Mills after 1920; company defunct about 1953 at which time mill was paper converting plant, now used as warehouse. |
| 19 | Judd Paper Company | | 1923 | 92 Race Street | | Designed by George P. B. Alderman, originally home of paper converter. Redeveloped in 2012 as entertainment venue, restaurant, and coworkshop, Gateway City Arts. |
| 20 | Livingston Worsted Mills | | 1934 | 11 Berkshire Street | | Built for consolidation of Germania Mills' worsted wool division move from Rhode Island. Germania name was dropped around time of building's construction as spinning division was liquidated. Following closure of Livingston, briefly used by Kruger Tissue Paper following Livingston's closure, 1964-1966. Today known as the SulCo Warehouse Building. |
| 21 | Lyman Mills | | c. 1854 | 4 Open Square Way | | Originally processing cotton for textiles, it is the only mill in the city built to the original plans of the Hadley Falls Company Now known as Open Square. |
| 22 | Massasoit Paper Mill | | 1873 | 380R Dwight Street | | Also known as Massasoit Division of American Writing Paper Company. Westerly wings razed after 1957; restored in 2019 for retail use by Canna Provisions. |
| 23 | Merrick Thread Mill, No. 2 | | | 195 Appleton Street | | Partial mill and office; half of complex burned down in October 1993. |
| 24 | Newton Paper Company Mill | | | 200 South Water Street | | Newton Bros. development; partially extant, heavily altered as Sonoco paper recycling plant |
| 25 | Norman Paper Company Mill | | 1892 | 5-13 Appleton Street | | Produced fine writing paper, design by D. H. & A. B. Tower |
| 26 | Prentiss Wire Mill/Holyoke Die Cut Card Building | | c. 1911, 1917 | 439 Dwight Street | | Originally built by the George W. Prentiss Wire Company with back 4-story section appearing on maps in 1911; 5-story front built in 1917. Prentiss built new facility in Homestead Avenue in 1962, by 1965 was occupied by Holyoke Die Cut Card Co. which owned the building until 2001. |
| 27 | RenCo Building | | 1920 | 728 Main Street | | Built about 1920 by the New England Tire & Rubber Company, and bought out by Reynolds Manufacturing Co. (RenCo.) in 1928, a converter and producer of notebooks and steno pads. Sold by RenCo in 1994 and subdivided, acquired by Holyoke Public Schools for supplies and office use in 2007. |
| 28 | Riverside Mill No. 2 | | 1867 | 1 Cabot Street | | Originally independent paper firm. Merged into American Writing Paper Company system, eventual home of National Blank Book. Presently used by Specialty Loose Leaf. |
| 29 | Valley Mill | | | 4 Valley Mill Road | | Produced fine writing paper as the Valley Paper Company, presently used as offices of Western Mass Elder Care |
| 30 | The Wauregan | | 1879 | 420 Dwight Street | | Newton Bros. development, subsequently part of American Writing Paper Company system; presently used by Holyoke Creative Arts Center, and as workshops. |
| 31 | Whiting Paper No. 1 | | | 28 Gatehouse Road | | Partially extant, part of series of 3 original mills used by Whiting Paper. Now owned by James Curran and the Wherehouse. |

== Demolished ==
| | Name | Image | Built | Destroyed | Location | NRHP Listing | Notes/Use |
|---|---|---|---|---|---|---|---|
| 1 | Albion Paper Mill | | 1869 | 2018 | 16 Water Street | | One of the earliest known designs of David H. Tower. |
| 2 | Baker-Vawter Company | | 1885 | 2005 | 686 Main Street | | Built as the eastern manufacturing branch of the Baker-Vawter Company, a loose-leaf binding and systems company, later used by Pratt & Austin and numerous other businesses. |
| 3 | Deane Steam Works | | | 2019 | 37 Appleton Street | | Later became the Holyoke works of the Worthington Corporation. |
| 4 | Farr Alpaca Company Building #2 | | c. 1894 | After 1955 | 68 Jackson Street | | Now Sullivan Metals Co. Inc. offices. |
| 5 | Farr Alpaca Company Main Building | | c. 1905 | Before 2007 | Bigelow Street | | Later used by Pioneer Valley Finishing; part of larger complex, not to be confused with building razed in 2011 for MGHPCC. |
| 6 | Germania Woolen Mills | | 1863 | 1934 | Race and South Streets | | Operated under a different name for first two years, name dropped in 1934 as spinning and combing division was liquidated, weaving and finishing continued at Livingston Worsted Mills until business closed altogether in 1965. |
| 7 | Holyoke Envelope Company | | c. 1889 | After 1957 | Water Street and Main Street | | After 1898 referred to as the United States Envelope Company, Holyoke Division. Later home of Polep Brothers. |
| 8 | Keating Wheel Company | | c. 1895 | After 1957 | 30 Dwight Street | | Later used by Eureka Blank Book. Foundation visible immediately north of Edaron Shipping dock on Canal Street, used as parking. |
| 9 | Linden Mill | | 1892 | c. 1979 | 55 Jackson Street | | Subsequently part of the American Writing Paper Company. In production under the Brown Company as late as 1968. |
| 10 | National Blank Book/J. G. Shaw Building | | 1898 | After 1978 | Water Street and Canal Street | | Was located in lot immediately between railroad tracks, Hampden Paper loading docks, and Water Street. |
| 11 | New York Woolen Mill (Connor Bros.) | | 1864 | Before 1957 | 649 Main Street | | Sold to A.T. Stewart & Co. of New York in 1870, and then Connor Brothers before 1883, which operated until a 1901 bankruptcy. Holyoke Plush Company operated out of there by 1911. |
| 12 | Old Smith Cotton Mill | | c. 1820 | Before 1884 | Gatehouse and Hadley Mill Road | | Initially a wool fulling mill built by Chapin family, converted to cotton mill by Edward Smith. Replaced by expansion of Parsons No. 1. |
| 13 | Parsons Paper No. 1 | | c. 1852 | After 1957 | Gatehouse and Hadley Mill Road | | Originally a flour mill, converted to paper in 1853, expanded several times. Later became part of American Writing Paper Company system. |
| 14 | Parsons Paper No. 2 | | 1888 | 2008 | 80 Sargeant Street | | Last paper producer in Holyoke, active until 2005, razed by arson in 2008 |
| 15 | Riverside Mill No. 1 | | c. 1867 | Before 1957 | 120 Middle Water Street | | Replaced by warehouse and parking lot. |
| 16 | Syms & Dudley Mill | | 1881 | c. 2011 | 22–24 Water Street | | Later expanded to have two towers, bought out by Nonotuck Paper Company which had its original mill immediately adjacent; designed by Ashley B. Tower. |
| 17 | Whiting Paper No. 2 | | 1873 | 1964 | 383 Dwight Street | | Razed by fire in apparent arson in 1964. |
| 18 | William Skinner and Sons Mill | | | 1980 | | | Expanded several times; touted as largest silk mill in the world by 1922. |
| 19 | Winona Paper Company Mill No. 2 | | 1880 | c. 2014 | 26 Water Street | | Designed by D. H. & A. B. Tower. Also known as the Geo. C. Gill Mill after 1891; later part of the American Writing Paper Company. sold to the Brown Company in 1963. |

== See also ==
- Holyoke Canal System
- Holyoke Dam
- List of mills in Fall River, Massachusetts
- List of mills in New Bedford, Massachusetts
- List of mills in Oldham
