= AWPC =

The initialism AWPC may refer to:

- Amateur World Powerlifting Congress
- American Writing Paper Company
- AgustaWestland Philadelphia Corporation, a wholly owned subsidiary of Leonardo Helicopters
