= Thomas Hill Standpipe =

- Bangor Standpipe
- U.S. National Register of Historic Places
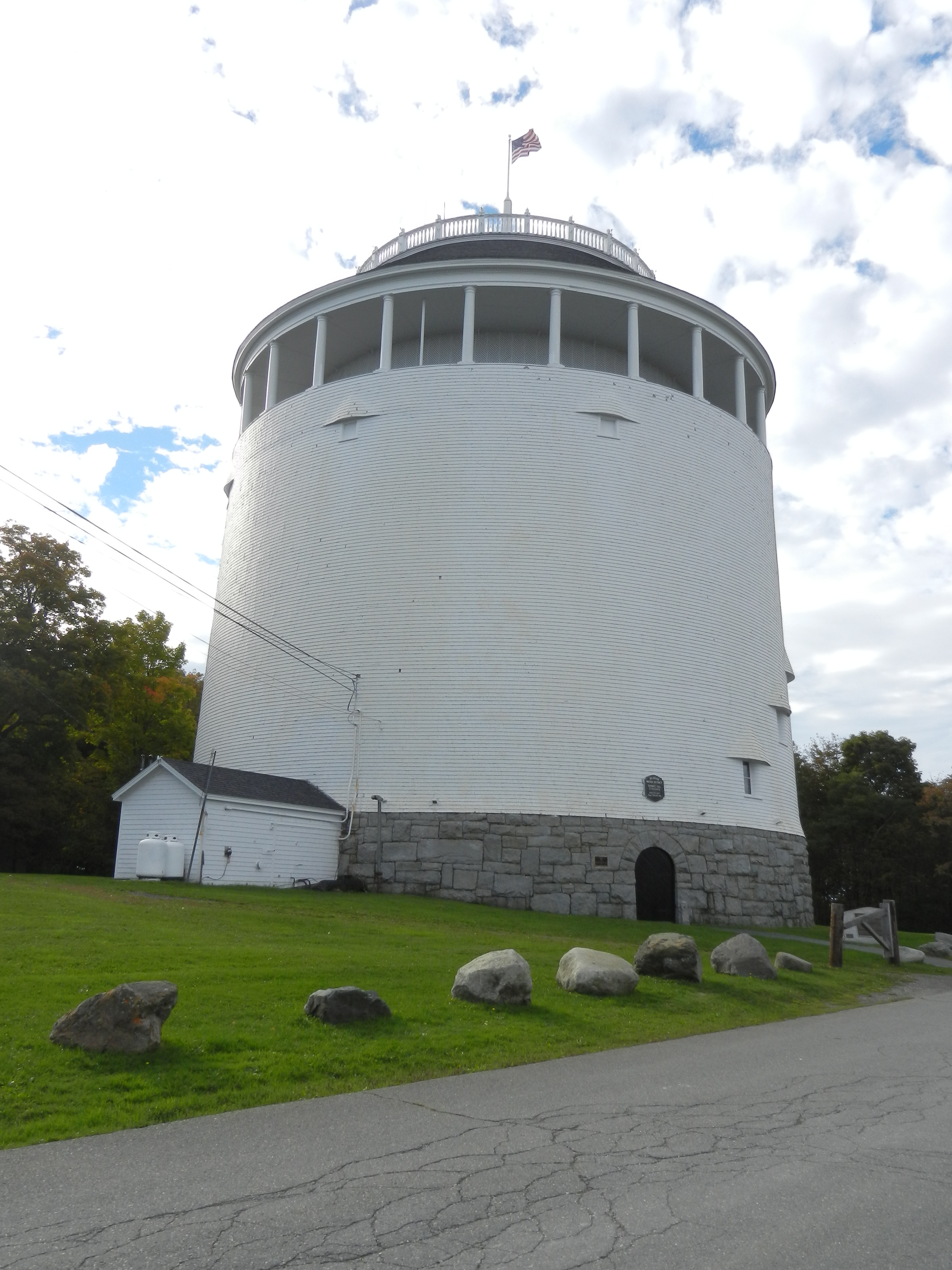
- Thomas Hill Standpipe
- Location: Jackson St; Bangor, Maine
- Coordinates: 44.8074°N 68.7829°W
- Built: 1897
- Architect: Ashley B. Tower; Tower & Wallace
- NRHP reference No.: 74000185
- Added to NRHP: August 30, 1974

Thomas Hill Standpipe, which holds 1,750,000 US gallons (6,600,000 L) of water, is a riveted wrought iron tank with a wood frame jacket located on Thomas Hill in Bangor, Maine, United States. The metal tank is 50 feet (15 m) high and 75 feet (23 m) in diameter. Built in 1897, it is an architecturally distinctive city landmark, and was listed on the National Register of Historic Places in 1974.

== History ==
Built in 1897, it is the district's oldest standpipe and has been in use since its construction. Its purpose is the same today as when it was built; to help regulate Bangor's water pressure in the downtown area and to provide water storage for emergencies. In 1895, it was discovered that the city pumping station contained faulty equipment, risking the possibility of a city water shortage.

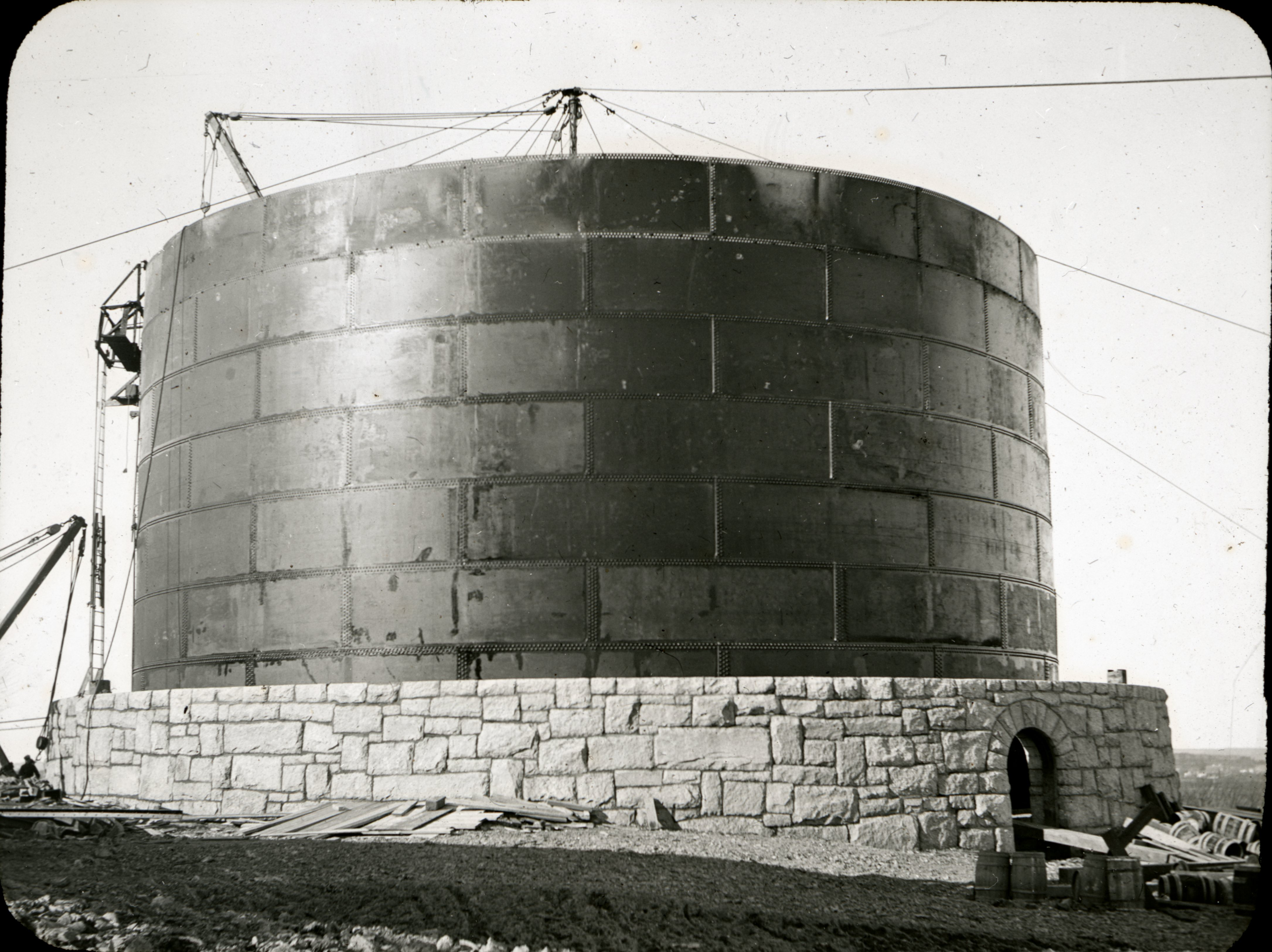
Thomas Hill Standpipe under construction

Ashley B. Tower of Holyoke, Massachusetts, designed the structure and in 1897 the New Jersey Steel and Iron Co. assembled the 50-foot (15 m) high and 75-foot (23 m) diameter steel tank atop Thomas Hill. The land had been owned previously by brothers James and Charles Thomas.

The original specifications for the standpipe consisted of four single-sided legal pages, and, unusually, gave the architect the right to freely change the labor and material costs without voiding the contract. The final construction cost was $295,109.36.

Originally, the exterior was painted dark gray with the pillars and lattice work painted white. During World War II, the standpipe was painted olive drab for camouflage purposes, because of its proximity to Dow Army Airfield, but it was repainted white in 1949. While once open to the public, it was closed during the war, following a 1940 accident in which a 12-year-old boy was killed when he fell while climbing on the beams under the stairway.

Bangor Water District assumed ownership of the standpipe in 1957 when a quasi-municipal (separate from the city) water district was formed.

Recently, a fire detection system and a "dry" sprinkler system which can be filled from an outside hydrant were added to protect the landmark structure.

== Structure ==
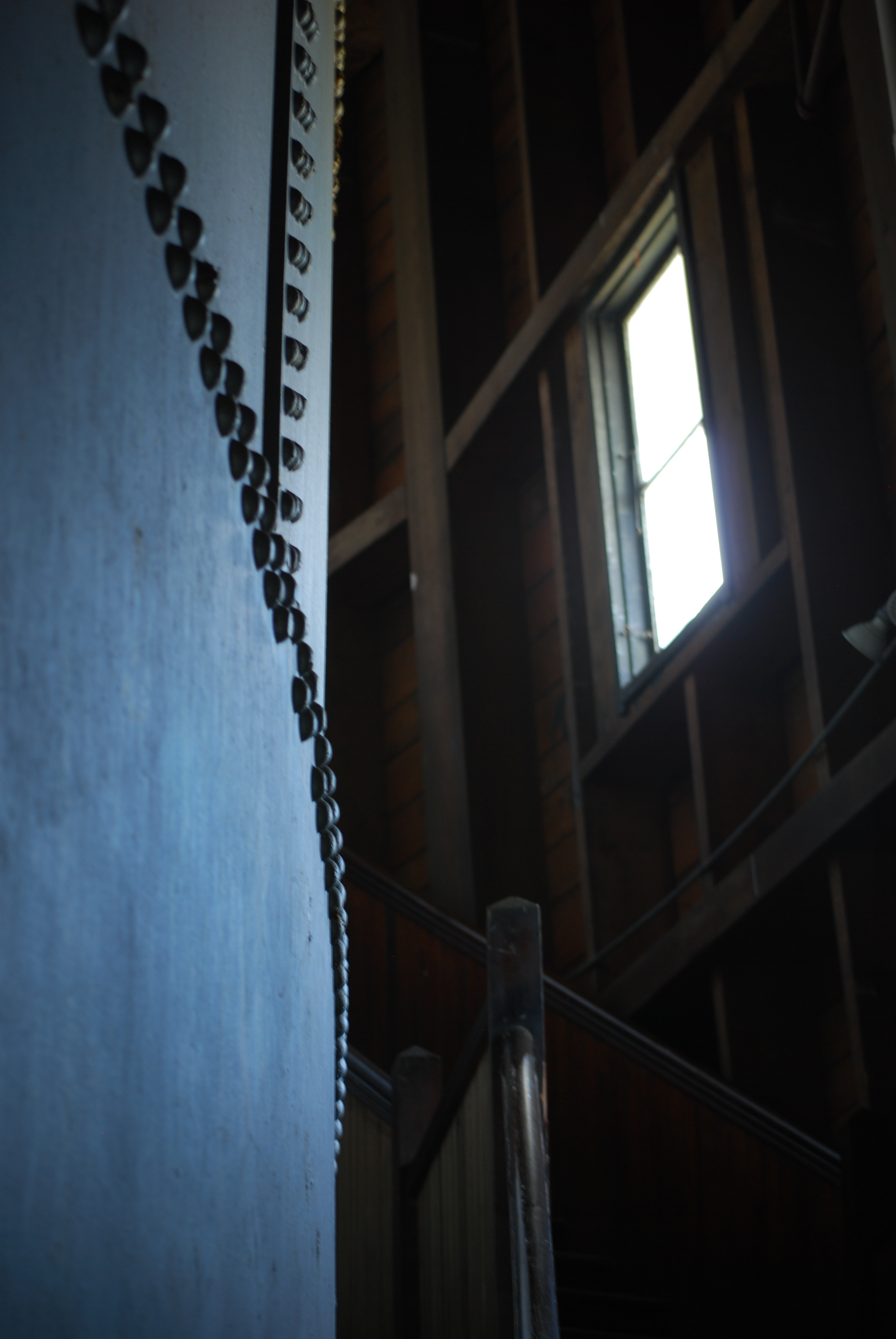
Stairway inside the Thomas Hill Standpipe between the exterior and interior walls.

The standpipe is really two structures in one. The standpipe itself consists of steel plates riveted one outside the other. The building which enclosed it is 85 feet (26 m) in diameter and 110 feet (34 m) high.

The 24 main posts which extend up past the observation deck begin at the base of the structure. Made of hard pine, they measure 12×12 inches and are 48 feet (15 m) long. The entire structure has a stone foundation 9 feet (2.7 m) high and 3½ feet thick at the base. The sill atop the foundation is made of bent pine planks and is 14 inches (360 mm) thick.

Along the interior wall of the façade is a winding staircase which leads to the promenade deck encircling the top of the building. The deck is 12 feet (3.7 m) wide and 280 feet (85 m) in circumference.

The exterior of the building is clad in wooden shingles, and the line of windows that illuminate the inside stairs are topped by hoods in the then-popular Shingle style of architecture. To erect the wooden part of the structure took 42,000 feet (13,000 m) of hard pine and 22,000 cedar shingles. James M. Davis of Bangor, who had recently built the original Bangor Auditorium in only 22 days, set up a portable saw mill and blacksmith shop on the site and employed 22 men. The entire project took about six months to complete, and was filled starting in June 1898.

The lights around the top of the Standpipe are sometimes referred to as "the crown on the Queen City".

== Tour Schedule ==
As of April 2024, the promenade deck is opened up four times a year to visitors.

== Landmark Status ==
The standpipe is listed on the National Register of Historic Places. In 1980, it was designated as an American Water Landmark by the American Water Works Association. It was designated as a Maine Historic Civil Engineering Landmark by the American Society of Civil Engineers in 2008.

== Geography ==
The standpipe is 225 feet (69 m) above sea level. It is located northwest of downtown Bangor, atop Thomas Hill.
