= Jim Prentice (game designer) =

American game designer (1909–2005)

- Prentice receiving the Abbott Award, 1993
- Born: May 29, 1909; Holyoke, Massachusetts
- Died: January 16, 2005 (aged 95); Holyoke, Massachusetts
- Resting place: Forestdale Cemetery
- Known for: Board game designer
- Notable work: Electric Baseball

- (Note: Stylized signature used by Prentice on his games and related ephemera.)

James Mason Prentice (May 29, 1909 – January 16, 2005) was an American game designer and businessman who founded The Electric Game Company. At the age of 17 he invented a simple electric baseball game which went on to become his best-selling game, as well as the first board game of its kind to use electrical relays.

== Personal life ==
James Prentice was born on May 29, 1909, in Holyoke, Massachusetts, to Mr. and Mrs. George M. Prentice (née Doherty). Growing up on Lawler Street, he would attend the Williston Northampton School for some period of time but ultimately graduated from Holyoke High School. Contrary to his later reputation as a sports game designer and the reputation a name like "Jim Prentice Electric Baseball" might lend, Prentice himself wasn't a baseball player. In a March 2000 interview with the Springfield Union-News, lifelong friend Harry Craven Sr. noted "when I was playing baseball, Jimmy was working on his game". He would tinker with electronics during study hall at Holyoke High School, leading to the eventual development of his trademark games.

Upon graduating from high school, Prentice went on to major in mathematics at the University of New Hampshire, graduating in 1933. In 1939 he married Elizabeth Ellen Warren. Prentice was known to be a humorist in some of his designs but also difficult as a boss, later claiming to fire 14 of every 15 employees he would hire. Outside of business life he was an active Rotarian, serving as president of Holyoke's Rotarian chapter, as well as the Holyoke Boys' Club, and as president and a director of the Toy Manufacturers Association.

== Game design and career ==
At the age of 17, Prentice invented the Electric Baseball game which would be his bestselling game when he later went into business. Initially developed during study hall in high school, when he first created the game, Prentice had not expected to make it into part of a broader career. However within a year of developing Electric Baseball, Prentice test-marketed it to school children in Holyoke and surrounding cities. By the time he was 19, his game had attracted the attention of several manufacturers who negotiated with him terms for production under contract; Parker Brothers ultimately manufactured the first version, with one electrical engineer of theirs describing it as "one of the cleverest cross-switches yet produced." A compendium on Massachusetts industries at the time also described the game as "the only mechanical [board game] device yet perfected that is practical and easy of operation". Its mode of operation was simple, it was a two player game using switches and relays which would record baseball, and later football and basketball games, play by play, displaying scores with colored lights on the board.

The year after his patent, Prentice, then 20, was able to get his first electric baseball games sold in Jordan Marsh for Christmas, his first order by a department store. After graduating from the University of New Hampshire in 1933, he worked for a time for White & Wyckoff making $14 a week as an office boy, while in his spare time modernizing his game, selling 200 copies within his first months of sales. In the following year he took out a loan and commissioned for his games to be manufactured for him on a larger scale, and in 1935 his uncle Arthur Doherty offered him $3,000 in startup money to work on the project full time. Sales proved so successful that his father and uncle began manufacturing the game at 177-179 High Street in 1935, and by 1938 were able to sell 35,000 boards. Game historian Bruce Whitehall describes Prentice's first big break as a large order from Macy's, however in time he would also receive a good amount of his business from ads in comic books. He and his family partners first expanded production in 1937, moving to the 3rd floor of White & Wyckoff No. 2 building, adding Electric Basketball to the lineup. George Prentice, James's father and the company's first president had also served as a master mechanic at W&W, with the game business on the side. His uncle leveraged ties to his former job with the American Writing Paper Company to order supplies as treasurer, and James Prentice himself initially was secretary as well as head of product development for their new venture, the Electric Game Company, having invented all those produced. Many of the games that Prentice subsequently made were tested the same way as his initial baseball game, distributed freely to the local Boys and Girls Club. With rapidly expanding production and national sales the company moved several times over the next decade, to Hadley Mills in 1938, and Norman Mills in 1939 following the opening of a sales office in New York City. During the war, the Electric Game Company switched to producing military supplies, including 20,000 U.S. Army pup tents and 25,000 Navy bed rolls, as well as gas masks, and small parts for 5-inch/38-caliber guns. In 1945 the company again expanded its toy line to other additional sports games, although its baseball, basketball, and football games continued to be successful.

Many varieties of the electric games remain popular today with collectors, with more than 30 years of poorly documented varieties of the baseball game alone. To save money, many were sold with only a lid with no bottom by design, while others were a combination of multiple covers and bottoms as Prentice did this to use up old stock and save money. Most games of the Prentice's Electric Game Company used two probes with a connecting switch, one connection to a question or object, and the other to the correct answer. Despite a number of other subjects, including farming, firefighting and Battleship variants, the most popular of Prentice's games remained Electric Baseball. Prentice reported his favorite game to be one called "Formation Football" which was not electric, and sold few copies. Many of his one-off games were his favorites, and most remain scarce today as they were not produced in large runs due to high production costs.

In August 1954, Prentice's company bought the Mackintosh Building, today The Wherehouse, using its 80,000 sq feet for 140 employees to manufacture the company's products. By this time Paul Lefebvre had become his business partner and the company vice president. In 1955 they introduced a toy shaver without blades called the "Fuzz Buzz" which sold 750,000 units in its first year. Another success at the time was the Operation style game, Hole in the Head, introduced in 1956. Prentice by this time was a director of the Toy Manufacturers of the U.S.A., and was not alone in his endeavors. The paper and printing industries of Massachusetts were credited with having allowed not only him, but his more famous predecessors, Parker Brothers and Milton Bradley to maintain a large market share in the board game industry, with 85% of games sales manufactured in New England in 1958. At that time the Electric Game Company alone used United Box Co of Holyoke and Eastern Container of Springfield for boxes and cartons, Judd Paper Co for paper board, American Electric Cable for wire, M&L Plastics of Easthampton, and Berkshire Plastics of East Longmeadow for plastic components in their toys. By that time Prentice and his company had branched out to new types of games, including an electric "missile launcher" and electronic design kits. From 1956 to 1957 the company had $1,000,000 in sales, having doubled in size every five years up to that point.

== Later life and businesses ==
Prentice would sell off his game company in 1963. It would continue to operate under the name The Electric Game Company and maintain its electric baseball, basketball, and football lines, as well as its "Fuzz Buzz" shavers through 1969, but moved to West Springfield in 1967 for more modern offices. Prentice remained involved in the company in some capacity as a consultant. By 1968 the company introduced the new Electrocraft name for scientific electronics kits. However by the end of 1970, despite previous efforts at these new toy lines and reported optimism, the company shuttered and its equipment was sold at auction.

Prentice would go on to found his namesake PrenCo, which operated through the 1970s, was renamed from the Duramatic Company in 1980, remaining operational until the late 1990s. The company would manufacture a number of medical goods including geriatric bibs and novelties such as an automatic fly swatter called the "Durham Fly Killer", which he advertised solely in the back of Popular Science, and named after the hometown of his alma mater. While Prentice would later say he'd abandoned his electric game business due to competition from arcades and changing consumer tastes, he remained adamant there was still a market for his electric baseball and football games in the 1980s. By the end of his life he held 20 patents including those for his games, and had also sold half a million kits for a build-it-yourself hot rod kit, which was made up of a piece wood, a tiny Japanese motor, and small parts sold for a dollar each.

In addition to his laminated goods and novelty businesses, Prentice would spend much of the next two decades developing a baseball statistical metric he called "Batting Worth Average" or "BWA". He claimed this measure to be a more comprehensive metric than conventional batting average, as that does not include walks or sacrifice bunts. Prentice reported BWA took into consideration slugging percentage and other factors, as well as timing of hits with base runners, not lowering the score when an out for the batter advanced another player on a base. When this formula was applied to multiple historical games, Prentice claimed it better represented the odds for the outcome. For the 1978 American League East tie-breaker game, the team batting averages were .229 Yankees, to .306 Red Sox, while the BWA was .306 Yankees to .290 Sox. Prentice claimed that after reviewing in excess of 1000 games, the team with the higher BWA entering the game won 100% of the time. Stating in interviews that his system could be explained in 30 minutes, he hoped it would be taken up by general managers, but never did disclose it to the press. His aspirations to follow in the footsteps of Bill James's sabermetrics would ultimately never prove successful.

Although he would not produce any additional games commercially, Prentice received the first Anne Abbott Award from the American Game Collector Association in Worcester in 1993 for his pioneer work in electronic games. He would operate his PrenCo medical supply company through at least 1995, and remained in Holyoke in retirement. Prentice died on January 16, 2005.
