= D. H. & A. B. Tower =

American architects, civil and mechanical engineers

Coordinates: 42.206192°N 72.601977°W

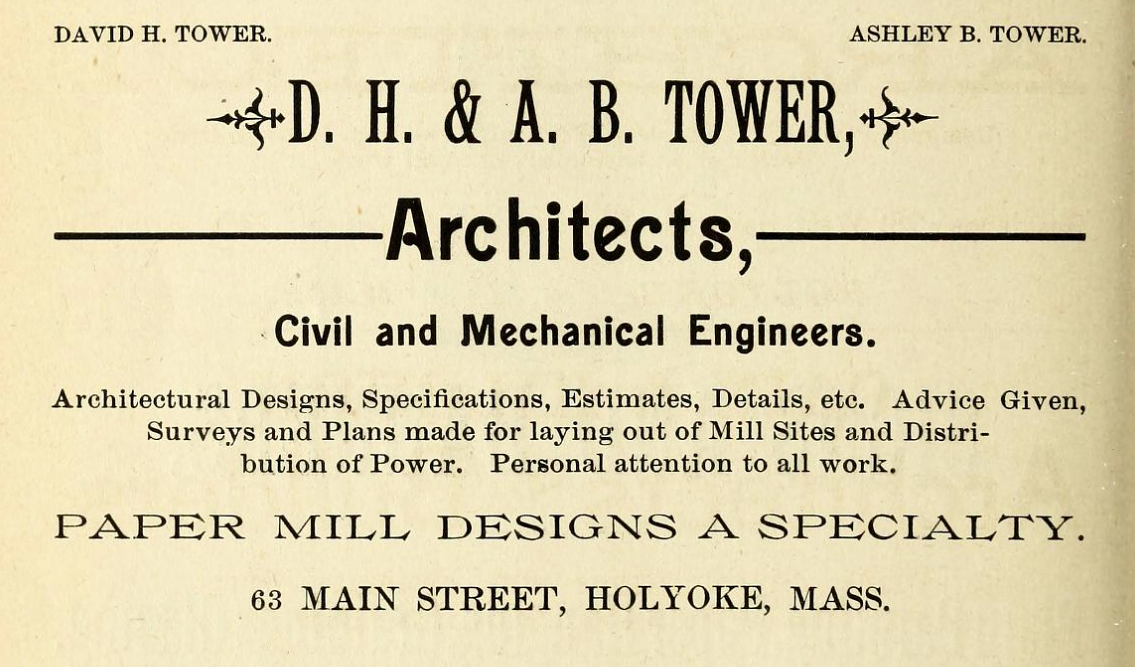

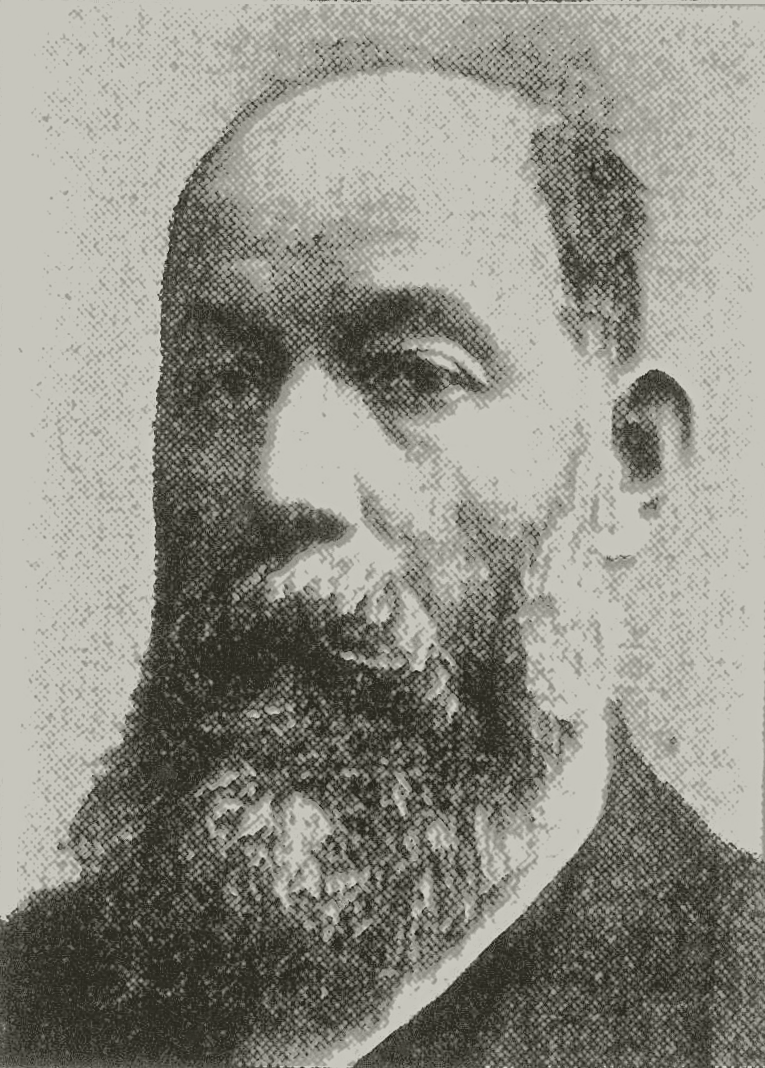
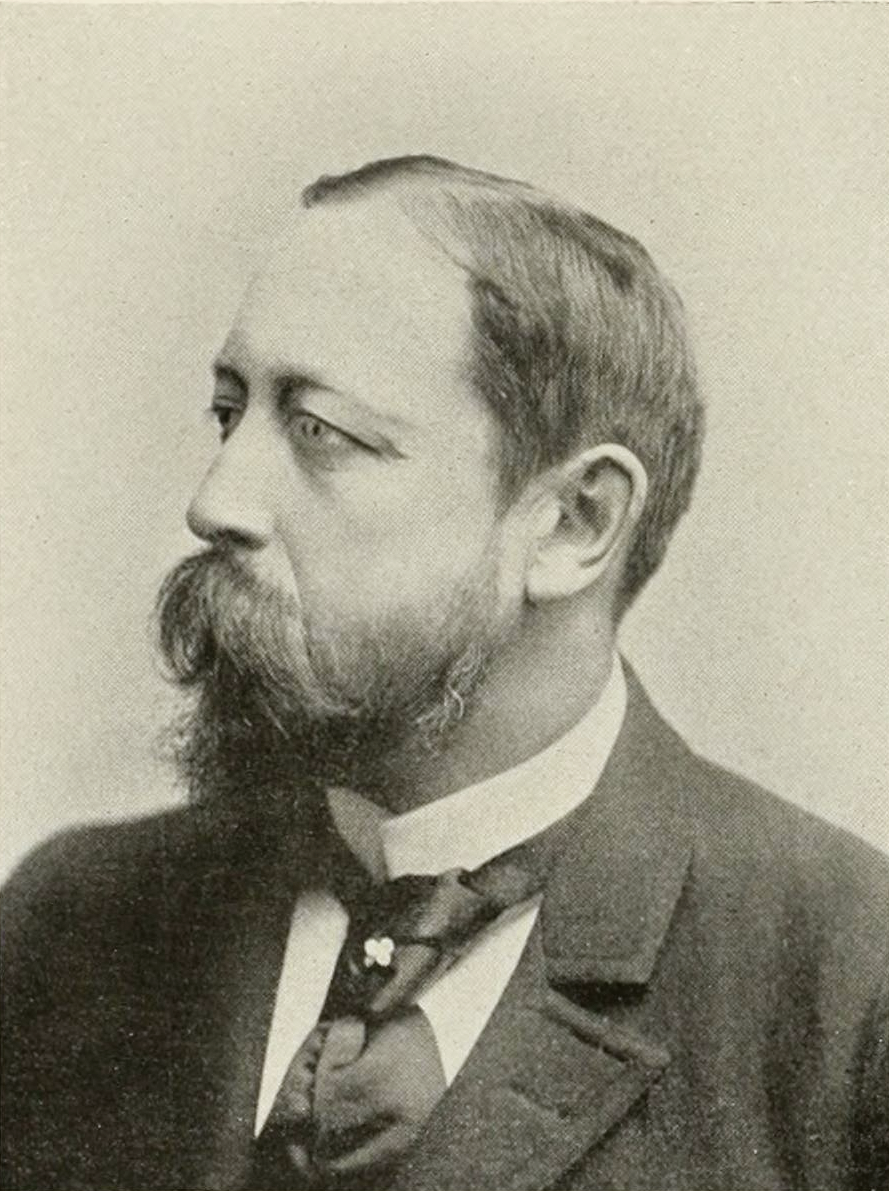
- David H. Tower (left) and Ashley B. Tower (right)

Practice information
- Partners: David H. Tower; Ashley B. Tower
- Founded: 1878
- Dissolved: 1892
- No. of employees: 35 (1892) (Note: Reported by one of their employees, at around the time of David Tower's retirement from the firm, 1893.)
- Location: Holyoke, Massachusetts
- Affiliations: A.B. Tower & Company; Tower & Wallace; George F. Hardy & Son

Doing business as D. H. & A. B. Tower, brothers David Horatio Tower (March 7, 1832 – December 22, 1907) and Ashley Bemis Tower (June 26, 1847 – July 8, 1901) were internationally known American architects, civil and mechanical engineers based in Holyoke, Massachusetts, who designed mills and factories in the United States from Maine to California as well as abroad, including in Canada, Mexico, Germany, Brazil, the United Kingdom, India, China, Japan, and Australia. By the time of its dissolution, the firm was described by one contemporary account as "the largest firm of paper mill architects in the country at that time"; its files reportedly contained more than 8,000 architectural plans for sites, mill machinery, and waterpower improvements.

In a treatise on his own work in mill engineering, Joseph Wallace, former partner to Ashley B. Tower, lauded their work posthumously saying "the history of paper mill engineering is largely the story of the work of the 'Towers of Holyoke,' followed by the younger generation of engineers trained in the Tower offices." Their most famous works include Kimberly-Clark's earliest pulp plants in Kimberly, Wisconsin for which Ashley B. Tower furnished designs, and David H. Tower's designs for Crane Currency, of Dalton, Massachusetts, for the first facilities to produce currency paper for the United States Bureau of Engraving and Printing.

== History ==
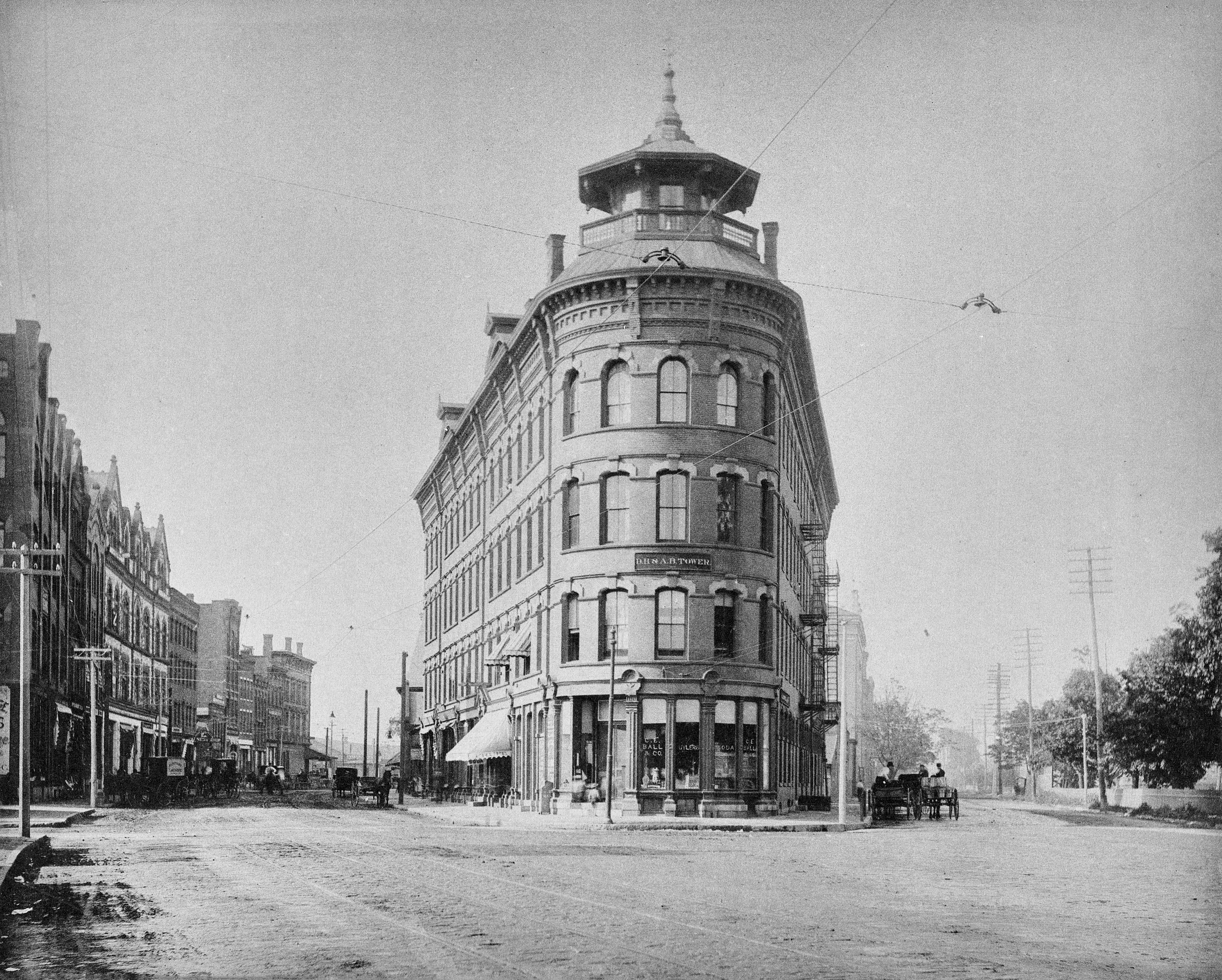
The offices of D. H. & A. B. Tower resided in Holyoke's Flatiron Building, also known as the Parsons Block, designed by William Ferro Pratt; the sign for their firm can be seen between the 2nd and 3rd floors.

David Tower, the senior partner of the firm, first entered the business of engineering paper mills as an apprentice millwright in 1845 at the age of 13, and eventually moved his own practice to Holyoke in 1867. Receiving a steady stream of work, David gradually brought on other draftsmen and was joined in 1871 by his younger brother Ashley B. Tower, who he mentored as his own apprentice. By 1878, Ashley Tower had become accustomed to the trade and an influx of business led to him being made the firm's junior partner, which became best known as D. H. & A. B. Tower.

From 1878 until 1892, the brothers Tower would produce some of their most prolific work. During this time the brothers furnished designs on mills and mill machinery in Holyoke, from Maine to California in the continental United States, and abroad on five continents. While an exact figure is unknown, in a cross-examination of Ashley Tower in a court case between the City of Holyoke and the Holyoke Water Power Company in 1899, Tower stated that of the mills built in Holyoke up until that time, he had been involved in the construction of 25 in some capacity, 16 of which were done in a central design role. While it is unclear from this testimony what share of work was done by each brother and how many of those mills designed were in the seven years following David's retirement Ashley Tower stated he had worked on more than 55 mills in key engineering roles, and more than 100 in any capacity.

The brothers would also play a significant role in establishing the economic success of the Kimberly-Clark company, designing one of its earliest groundwood pulp plants in Kimberly, Wisconsin in 1888. More significantly however, their designs for sulfite pulp mills in Appleton, Wisconsin built in 1890 gave the company a significant advantage. With this new plant the company had the resources and geographic scale of the American Midwest, while operating the first such mill west of Pennsylvania to adopt the improved process which derived almost pure cellulose from wood pulp.

At the beginning of their partnership the firm was located in the Hadley Falls Bank Building which sat at the corner of Main and Dwight (not to be confused with the later Hadley Falls Trust Building at the corner of Maple & Suffolk), and subsequently relocated to Holyoke's Flatiron block, which was said to have had advantageous lighting at most hours of the day due to its rounded northeast-facing corner, which had windows facing in three different directions. Originally Ashley B. Tower joined David H. as an apprentice, with no prior experience in engineering work or architecture besides a previous carpentry apprenticeship. In time his abilities exceeded his older brother's in certain regards; of the two, he was the only one known to hold patents- by 1885, he had invented an improved wood pulp grinder which would be used in their clients' mills domestically and abroad.

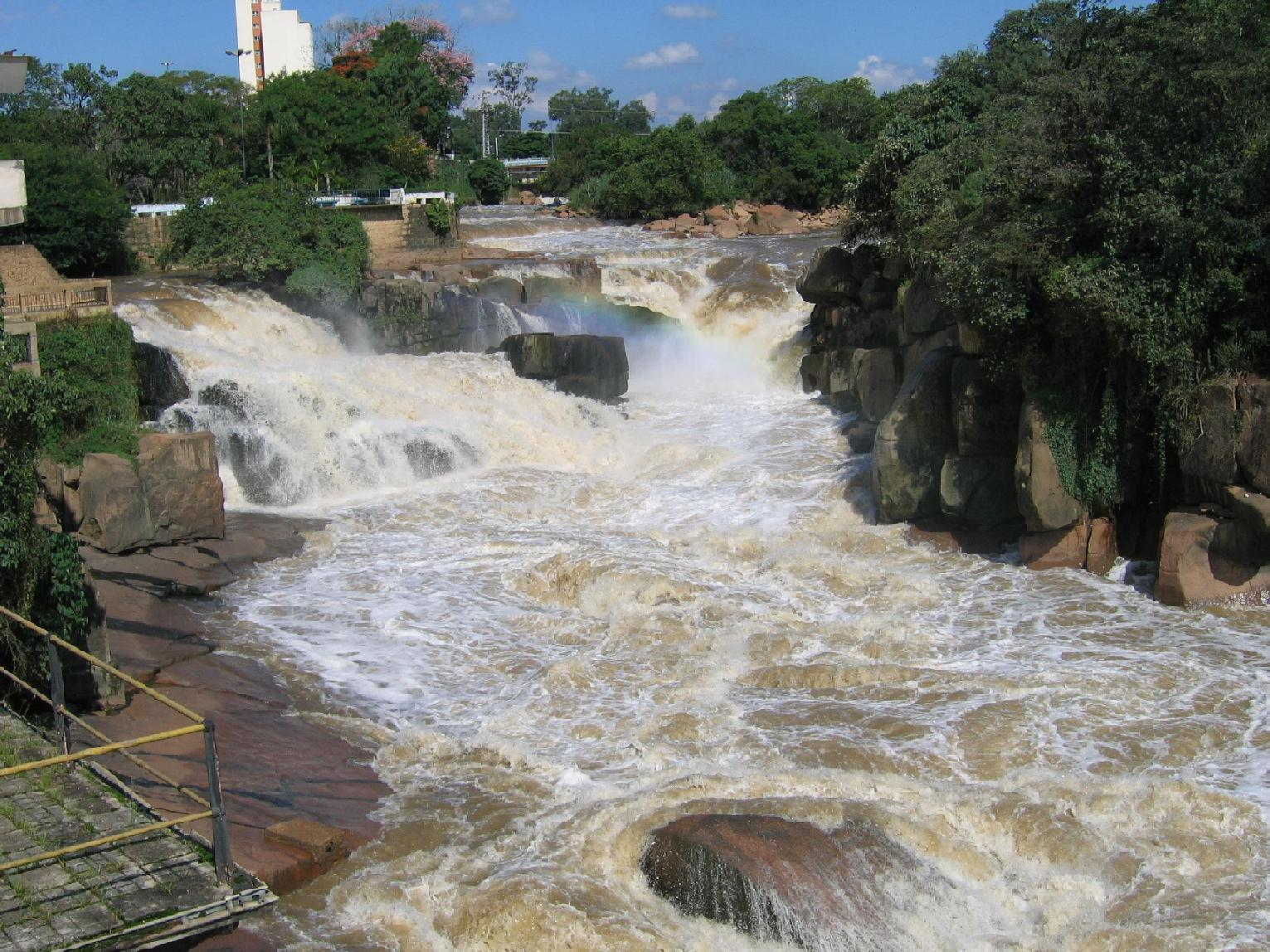
The sloping banks of Rio Tietê at Salto, São Paulo, the site where a large paper industry was begun through the mill designs of the brothers.

One of the things that reportedly made their firm successful was their study of foreign as well as domestic designs, with reports that the Towers went abroad to Europe in 1884–1885 to examine the latest designs in paper mills on that continent. Moreover, their firm placed a far greater emphasis on the surroundings of the sites at which their mills were constructed, rendering otherwise challenging terrain into the driving force of a mill's productivity. Among notable examples of this is the site of the Melchert & Cia Mill in Salto, São Paulo, Brazil. Designed and built in 1887 on the banks of the Tietê River, at the time of its construction it was regarded as a folly by locals, who mocked Melchert & Cia, its wealthy Brazilian backers, for "[the] insane idea of manufacturing paper in that country". Designed by the brothers Tower, it became the first industrial paper mill in South America and remains a functional site even today, producing large quantities of paper for currency.

Another example of the brothers' methodical research can be found in the construction of the, since demolished, Hampden County Jail. When first contracted for the design, the two not only consulted with county authorities through their several drafts of the facility's design, but personally travelled through a number of states to obtain the best working ideas for penitentiaries at that time.

They were described by several accounts as having been known internationally, with projects engineered by them in Canada, the United Kingdom, Australia, China, India, Japan, Mexico, Brazil, Germany, and Central American nations as well. Toward the end of their partnership, one account reports their company established a department devoted entirely to commercial and residential structures as well. Their architectural styles varied on the practicality of the project in question, and Second Empire and Italianate motifs can be found in their more ornate work. As if in jest, referencing their family name, the brothers were known for prominently featuring literal towers in their work, often decorative in nature, with faux battlements.

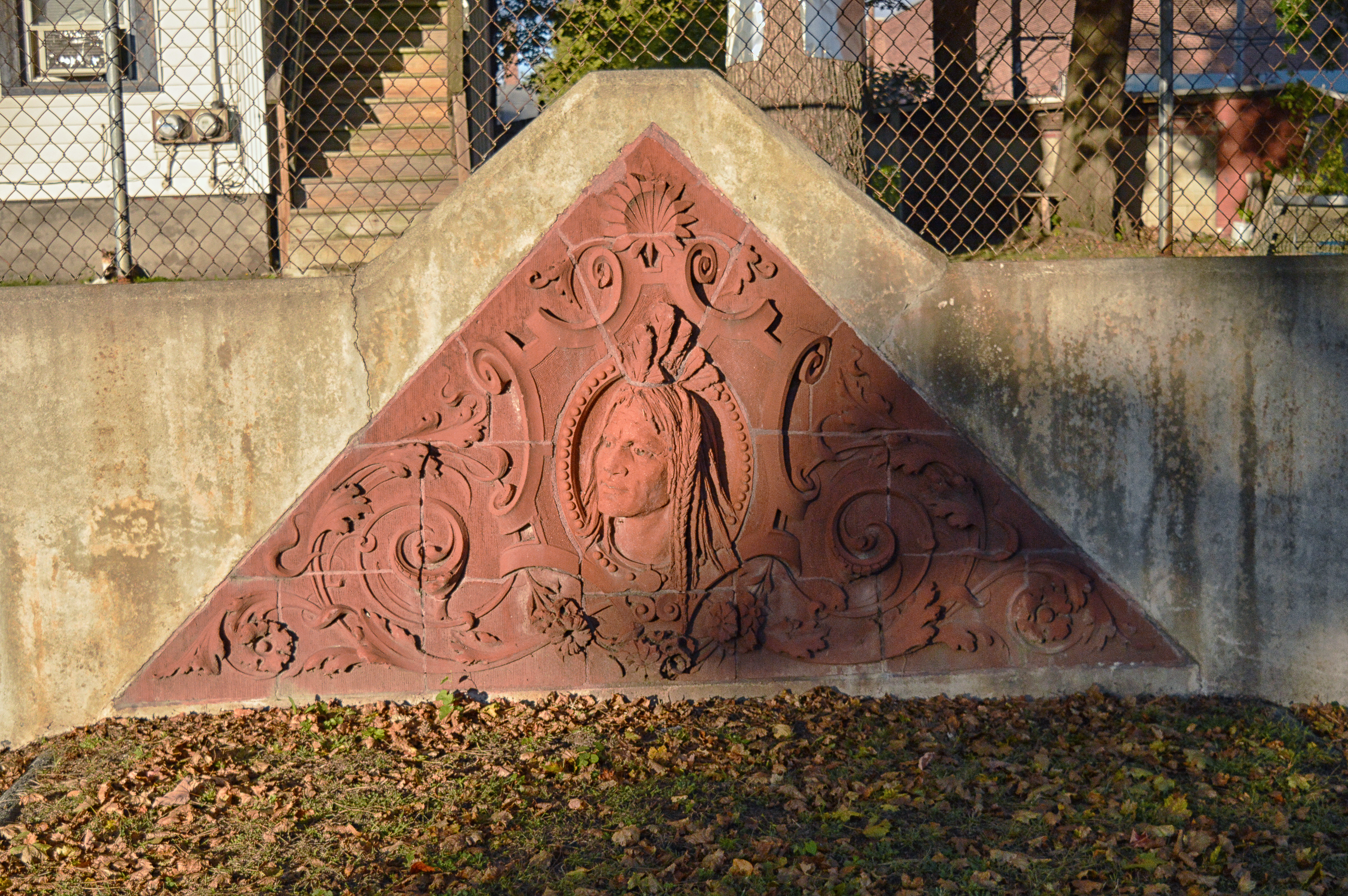
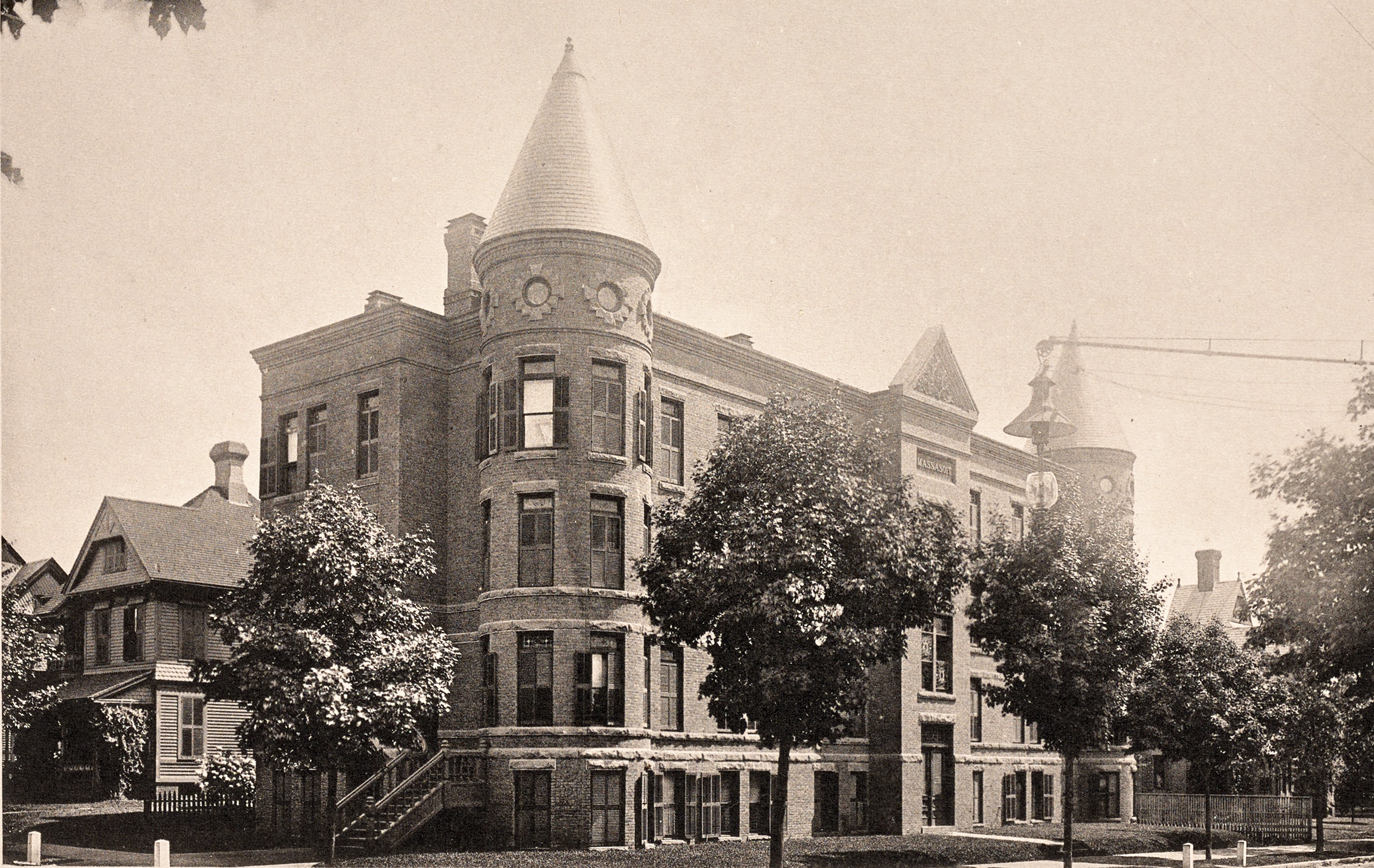
The Massasoit; built in Holyoke in 1891, it was a rare example of the firm's residential work. The terra cotta gable centerpiece, featuring the profile of the Wampanoag chief remains at the corner of Chestnut and Essex, set in concrete.

By 1897 the landscape of the Holyoke Canal System had become crowded with mills, with relatively little waterpower remaining for new projects. This, combined with demand for larger-scaled operations and ready access to raw material led Tower & Wallace to relocate to New York City, where the firm would remain for the next several years. It was reported by the end of the brothers' partnership that all of their architectural and mechanical designs, some 8,000 drawings were stored in a series of safes in the third floor of the Flatiron block for the purpose of preserving the designs for their clients in case of an emergency, the fate of these plans remains unknown, however following Ashley Tower's death in 1901, the assets of the former Tower firm in New York were purchased by their former draftsman George F. Hardy, who maintained his own engineering business in that city thereafter.

=== Legacy ===
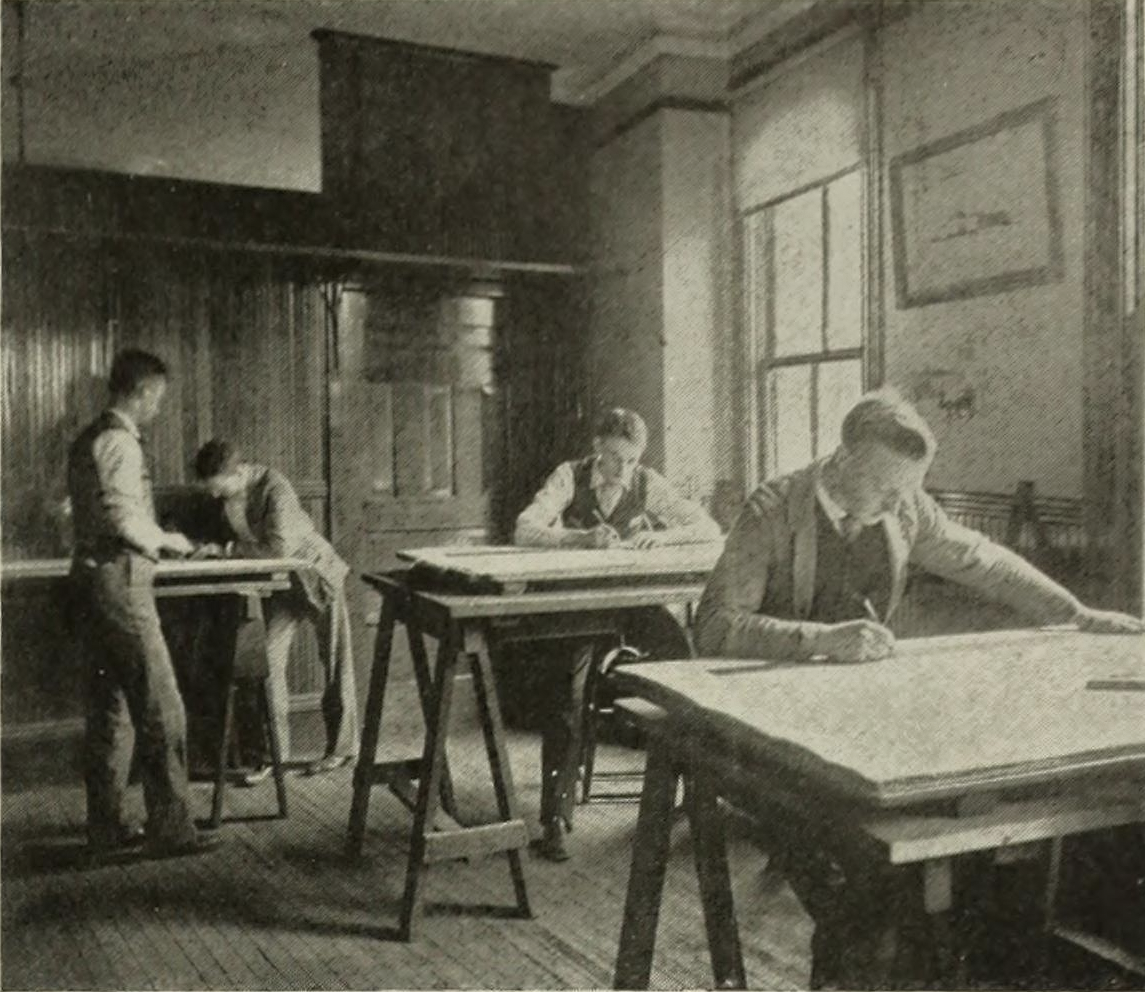
Draftsmen in the Tower offices, circa 1892

In their time the two were "widely regarded as the best paper mill architects in the world", attributed to the fact that the brothers employed both civil and mechanical engineering and made thorough study of sites to employ natural power in their architectural plans. Upon their deaths, the two brothers were praised like royalty, with Ashley Tower, described in one trade journal as "the Nestor of paper and pulp mill engineering" and David Tower touted by William Randolph Hearst's national news service as "the Paper King".

During the firm's time under the handle "D. H. & A. B. Tower", the two designed at least 100 or so mills, and this does not include those which had been designed and constructed by either brother individually before or after their dissolution, nor does this include the many works of their pupils, some of whom had served as A.B. Tower's junior partners in the years after 1892.

One entry for their office in 1890 described their office as employing 12-15 staff, whereas other accounts describe as many as 35, including stenographers, draughtsmen and civil engineers. The latter proved to become as much a legacy of the firm as their dozens of mills, as Joseph Wallace later described- "a number of the noteworthy pulp and paper mills erected in America have been entrusted to 'Tower' graduates."

Among these was George F. Hardy, who worked with the brothers starting in 1888, and become the junior partner of the firm a year after David's departure, from 1893 to 1896. Hardy would go on to become International Paper's first chief engineer, overseeing the logistics and technical work of operating its 17 mills when it first merged in 1898 He would ultimately leave this post in 1901, only to acquire the Towers' business in its last iteration in New York City, including a number of assets Ashley Tower left behind following his sudden death. Rechristened as George F. Hardy & Son, he would continue to build upon the legacy of his former employers, designing dozens of paper mills internationally for several more decades. So prominent became his work that he would later be described in a 1908 Congressional hearing on the industry as "the famous paper and pulp mill architect of the East".

Another noteworthy pupil of the brothers was Hardy S. Ferguson, who went on to build the Great Northern Paper Company's mills. The company's facilities, which remained operational into the 21st century, were his first independent project in 1899. He became another mill engineer subsequently who, in his own right, would influence mill engineering on an international scale as, at the time of its construction, the Great Northern Paper Mill was the world's largest.

Two alumni of the firm would go on to work as chief engineers of the Niagara Falls Hydraulic Power and Manufacturing Company, including Arthur W. French, who subsequently became a professor of engineering at the Worcester Polytechnic Institute, and Daniel P. Jones, who was tasked with not only its management but the expansion of its facilities.

Joseph Wallace, the biographer and evangelist of the brothers' work long after their deaths, joined the firm in 1894, soon after David's retirement. He became Ashley Tower's last junior partner in 1897, leaving shortly before Tower's death, and would go on to develop his own successful millwright business, one of his own major accomplishments being the design of hydraulic plants for Kimberly Clark.

== David H. Tower ==
David Horatio Tower
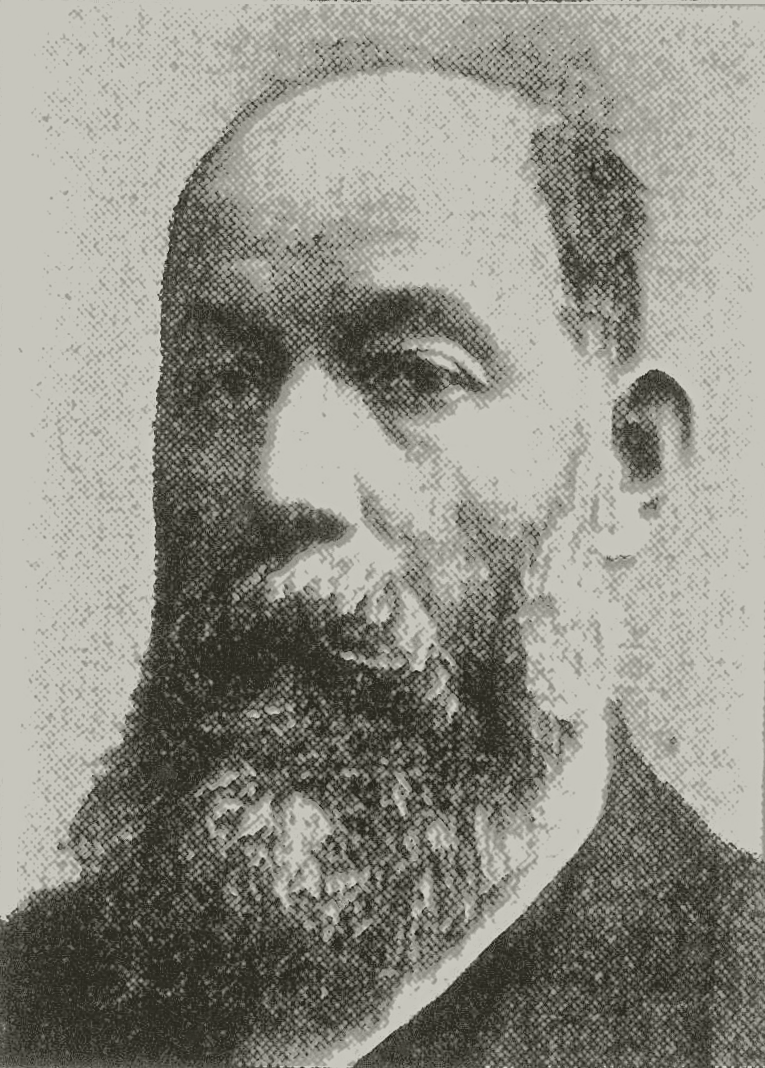
- Born: March 7, 1832; Cummington, Massachusetts
- Died: December 22, 1907 (aged 75); Dalton, Massachusetts
- Known for: Architect, civil engineer, mechanical engineer
- Spouse: Margaret Young (m. 1859)
- Children: 1

David Horatio Tower (March 7, 1832 – December 22, 1907) was born to Stephen Dyer Tower and Esther Eliza Tower (née Beal) on March 7, 1832, in Cummington, Massachusetts; he was the eldest of their ten children. When he was 3 years old, his family moved to Windsor, Massachusetts. Tower was educated at a small country school there until the age of 13, at which time he entered an apprenticeship with a local millwright.

His first notable job was his work in rebuilding the Crane Company's Red Mill of Dalton in 1846, which had been originally erected four years earlier by industrialist and papermaker Zenas Crane. This would be the first of many such projects that would characterize his career. Until his death in 1907, Tower was prolific in the construction, remodeling, and engineering of numerous paper mills as well as facilities for other industries. His work was wide-ranging, from the design of stationary buildings such as business blocks and residences, to the engineering of mechanical equipment such as dams and waterwheels.

On July 2, 1859, Tower married Margaret Young, of Glasgow, Scotland; the couple bore one son, Walter Lamont, who was born in Dalton on December 26, 1868. During the Civil War, Tower, 6 ft 6 in (1.98m) in stature, was exempt from the draft due to scoliosis.

Among those mills which David Tower was specifically identified with were the four paper mills of the Crane company of Dalton, Massachusetts, which continues to produce paper for the United States Treasury, as well as a number of foreign governments. He also worked closely with Byron Weston to develop paper mills in Dalton and Windsor, Connecticut. The very last mill Tower would design was the Pioneer Mill & Company, also built in Dalton.

In retirement he continued to do some work with the assistance of his son, including a dam to the local Egypt Reservoir in Dalton, which was part of a broader overhaul for the Crane company and the town alike, engineering a reservoir water system that would allow the town to make use of the pumps of the Weston mills for additional pressure in the event of a fire. David was also an avid breeder of Jersey cattle, and was recorded as having 20 cows and 9 sheep on his farm "Sunnyside" in 1885.

Throughout his life he had remained an active Congregationalist, but was not known to be a member of any fraternities, service organizations, or clubs. Having retired from business some years prior, David Tower died at his farm, "Sunnyside", in Dalton at 2pm on December 22, 1907; he was 75. In a nationally syndicated obituary, the Hearst News Service lauded Tower "the Paper King," describing him as "one of the greatest paper manufacturers in the world". He was interred at Main St Cemetery in Dalton, Massachusetts.

== Ashley B. Tower ==
Ashley Bemis Tower
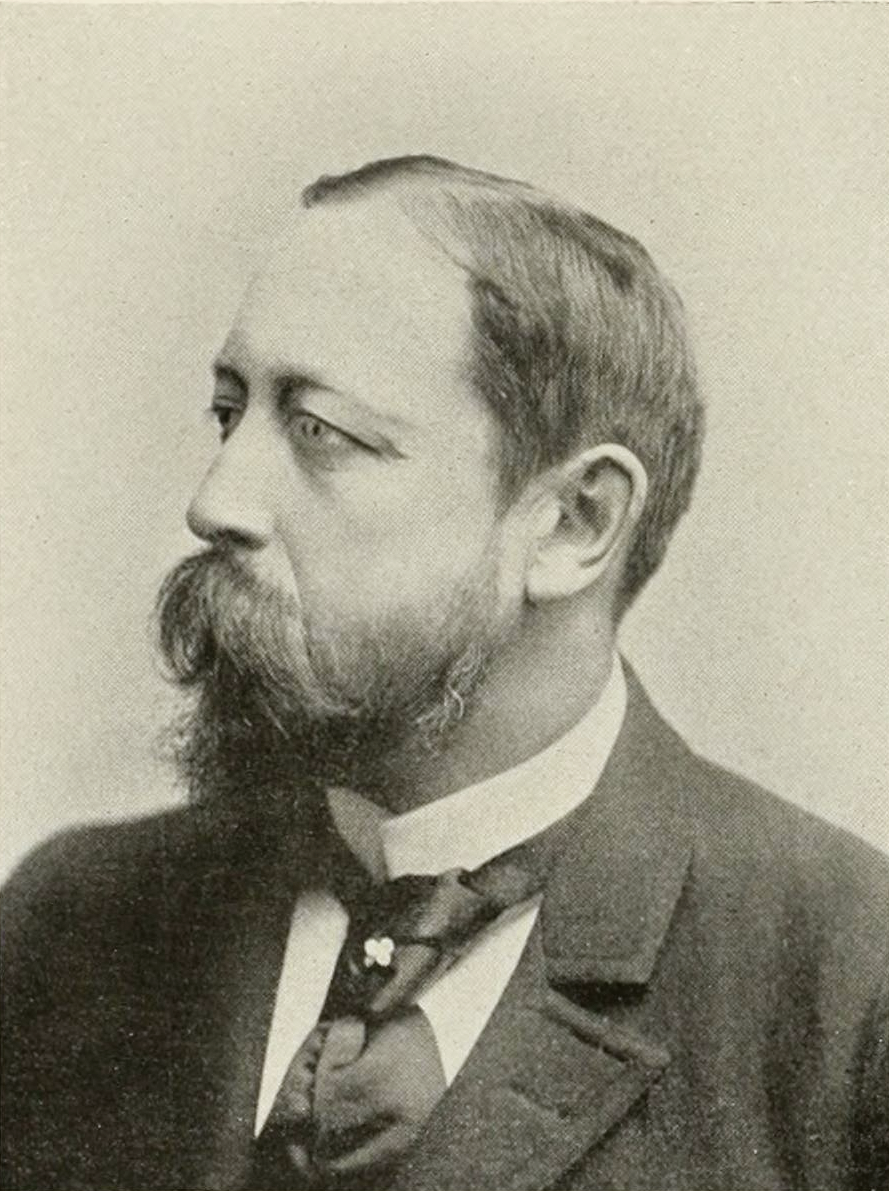
- Born: June 26, 1847; Windsor, Massachusetts
- Died: July 8, 1901 (aged 54); Montclair, New Jersey
- Known for: Architect, civil engineer
- Spouse: Pamelia J. Fritts (m. 1875)
- Children: 1

Ashley Bemis Tower (June 26, 1847 – July 8, 1901) was born to Stephen Dyer Tower and Esther Eliza Tower on June 26, 1847, in Windsor, Massachusetts; he was the youngest of their ten children. When he was 7 years old, the family relocated to Dalton, Massachusetts, where he attended school and worked with his father on the family farm.

In 1868 Tower left for Newburg, New York where he took up carpentry with one of his older brothers. Following this, he moved to Holyoke in 1871 where he studied engineering under his aforementioned brother David.

In 1875 he married Pamelia J. Fritts. Having gradually learned the millwright trade from his brother, he became the junior partner of D. H. & A. B. Tower in 1878. In order to keep their firm competitive and abreast of the latest developments in industrial architecture, Ashley Tower travelled twice to Europe to study foreign construction methods of paper mills.

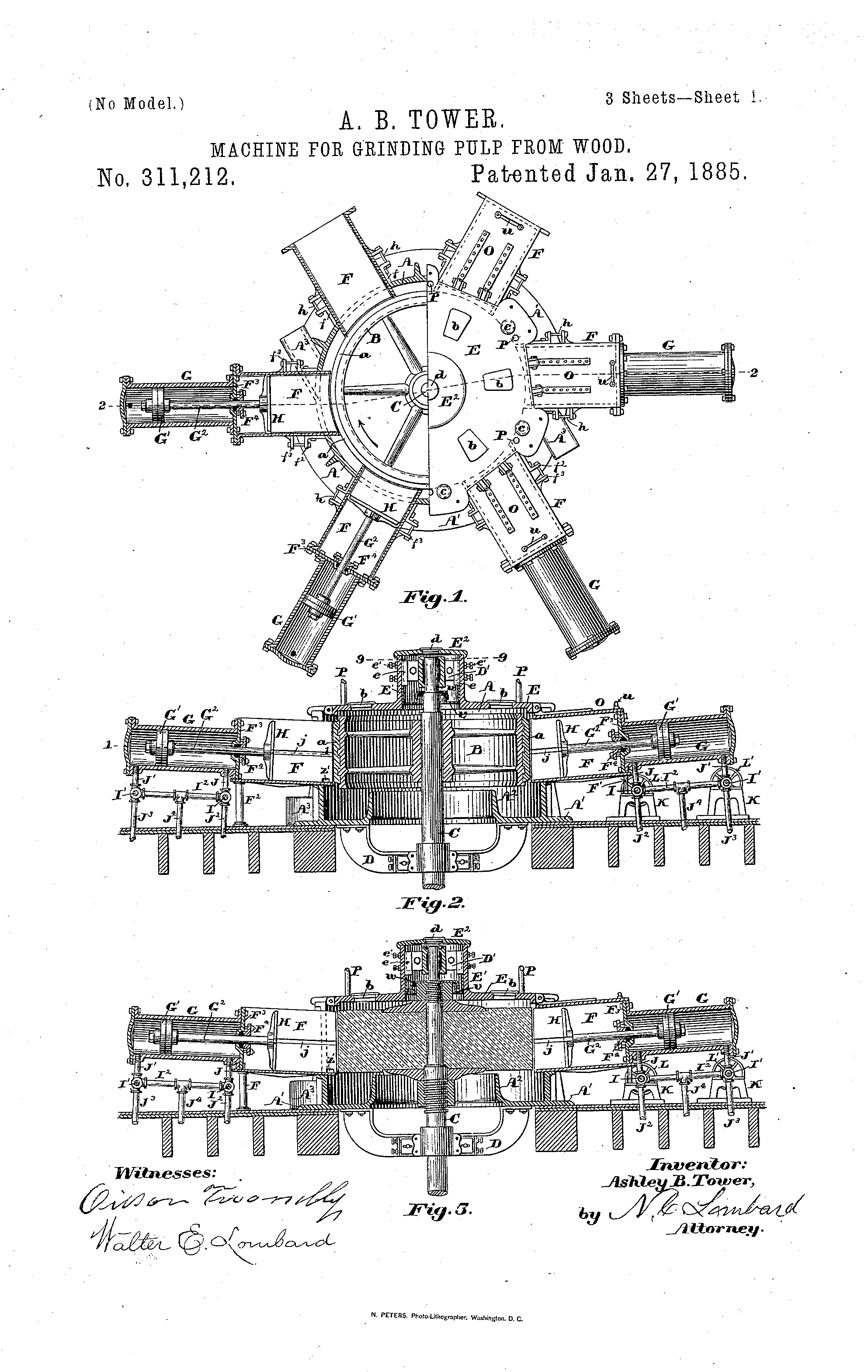
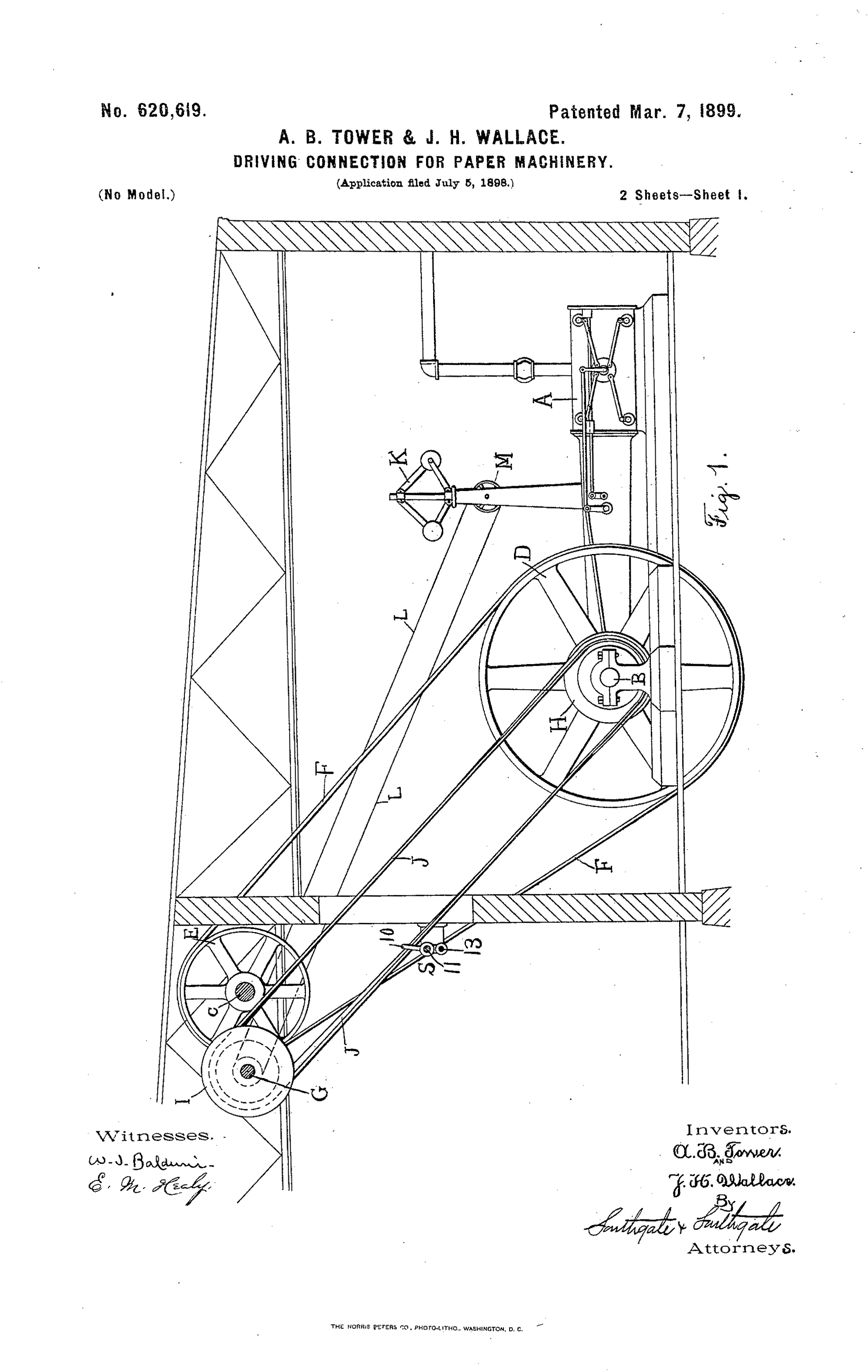
Patents
US311212A	US620619A
Machine for Grinding Pulp from Wood; January 27, 1885	Driving Connection for Paper Machinery; March 7, 1899

During this time Tower also served as City Engineer for Holyoke from 1881 to 1883, introducing reforms to that office. In this same time he also designed the grounds of the city's Calvary Cemetery, and served as a consulting engineer of the American Sulphite Company. By 1892 he had begun serving on the board of directors of the Denver Paper Mills Company. Closer to home he was also an active promoter in the development of Highland Park, being the figure petitioning the incorporation of a "Highland Park Improvement Company" in 1893.

On January 1, 1892, Tower bought out his brother's interest in the partnership, becoming the sole proprietor of the firm. He continued the business at their original location for the following year before partnering with George F. Hardy and becoming A.B. Tower & Company, a name which would be retained until 1896 upon Hardy leaving to pursue other opportunities.

Following a growth in business, Tower relocated to New York City in 1897 and partnered with civil engineer Joseph H. Wallace as his junior member under the firm Tower & Wallace. Reflecting the changes of the times, the firm began focusing on steel office building work in addition to the core clientele of paper mills. This firm name remained until February 1901 when Wallace left to pursue an independent career.

When the American Writing Paper Company trust went into business in 1899, Ashley Tower was among those hired to appraise its assets, having been involved in the design of many of them himself. At the time of his death he was in the midst of drawing plans for a large mill building in New Brunswick. While no works are known, an obituary reported he had done design work on a number of New York skyscrapers in his final years.

Tower was described as "domestic in his tastes" and maintained a library and private art collection. In contrast with his elder brother who refrained from participating in social or professional organizations, Ashley was a member of the American Society of Civil Engineers, as well as the American Society of Mechanical Engineers, and Canadian Society of Civil Engineers. Ashley also was an active freemason, being a member of not only the blue lodge but also a Knights Templar, and 32nd degree mason of the Scottish Rite. He was reportedly also very fond of horsemeat, and kept a stable of about a dozen horses.

On July 8, 1901, Tower died suddenly at his home in Montclair, New Jersey of "heat prostration". By the end of his life he had received critical acclaim in his field and was previously described by John A. Kimberly of Kimberly-Clark fame as "the prince of paper mill architects". Survived by his wife, and several of his siblings, he was interred at Oak Grove Cemetery in Springfield, Massachusetts.

== Selected works ==
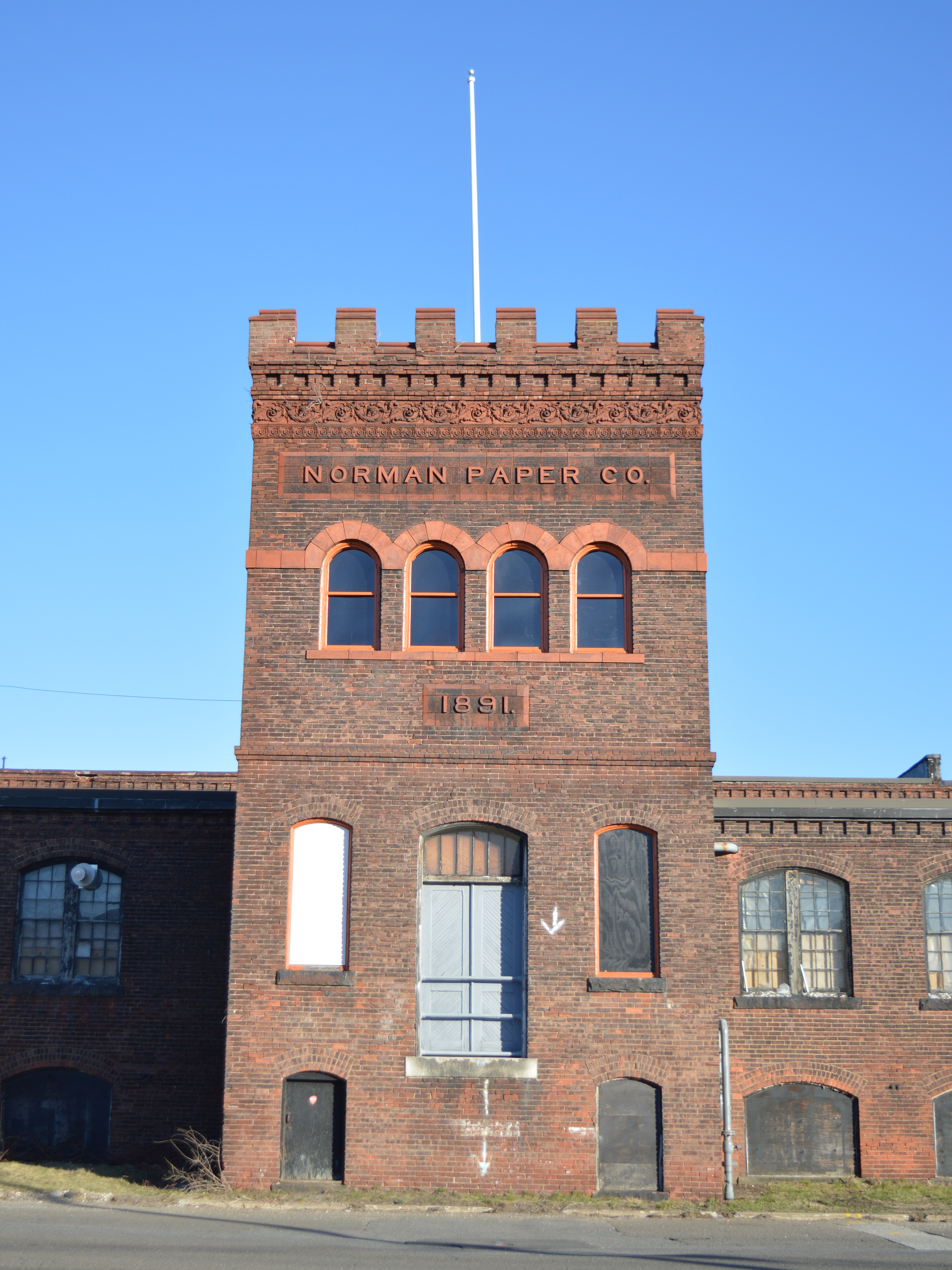
The tower of the Norman Paper Mill, additional details in its terra-cotta tiles and battlements

The list below contains several of the works of the brothers Tower; unless otherwise indicated by date or name, these projects were overseen by both during their time as partners. Not all works are represented below and in addition to their prolific domestic work, the brothers were said to have designed at least one paper mill in Japan during the Meiji period, as well as Australia, Brazil, Canada, China, Germany, India, Mexico, and the United Kingdom.

=== Paper and textile mills ===
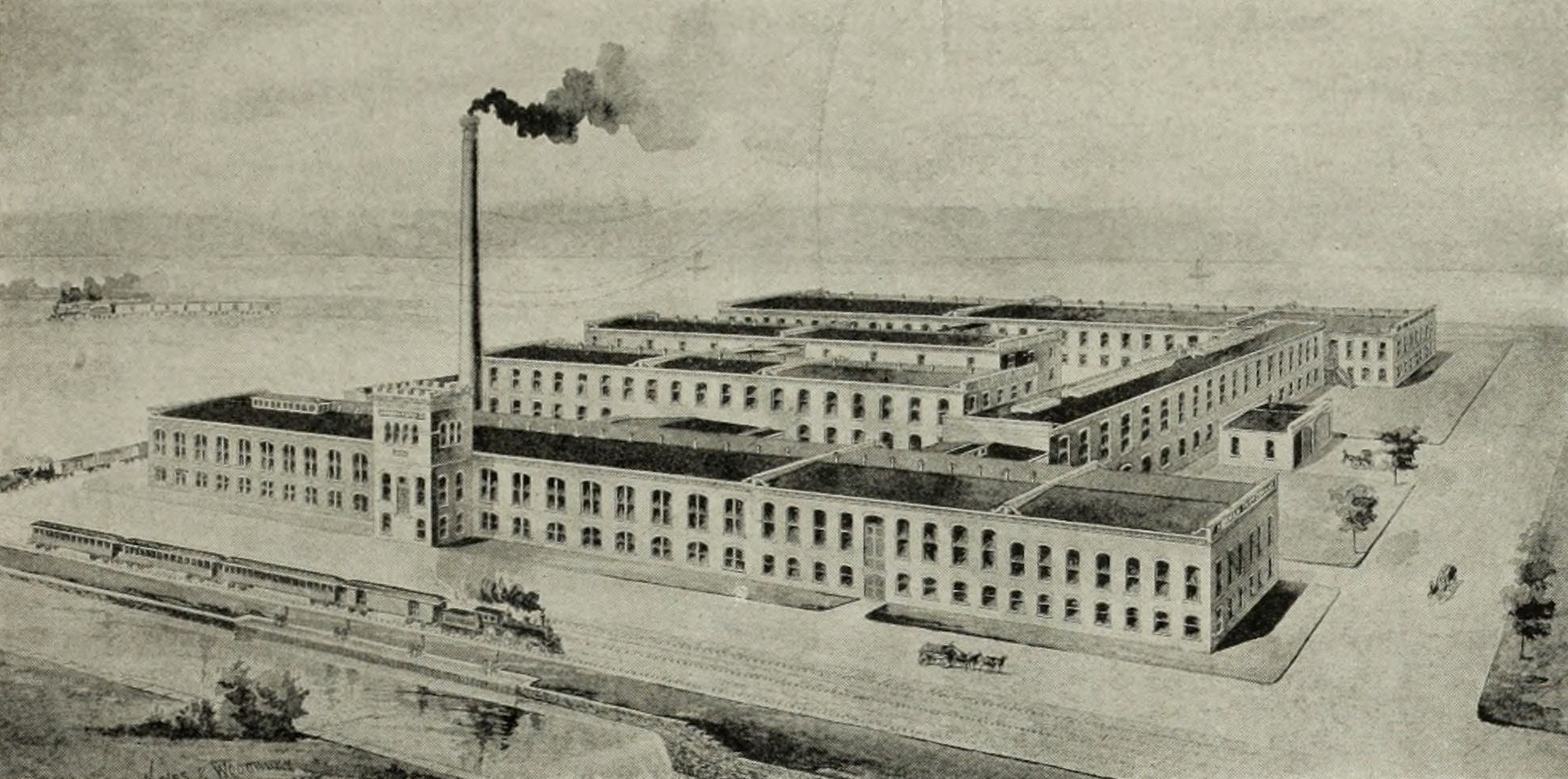
Perspective rendering of the Norman Paper Mill, completed in 1892, it was one of the last mills designed jointly by the brothers, and one of the most complete architecturally in Holyoke today

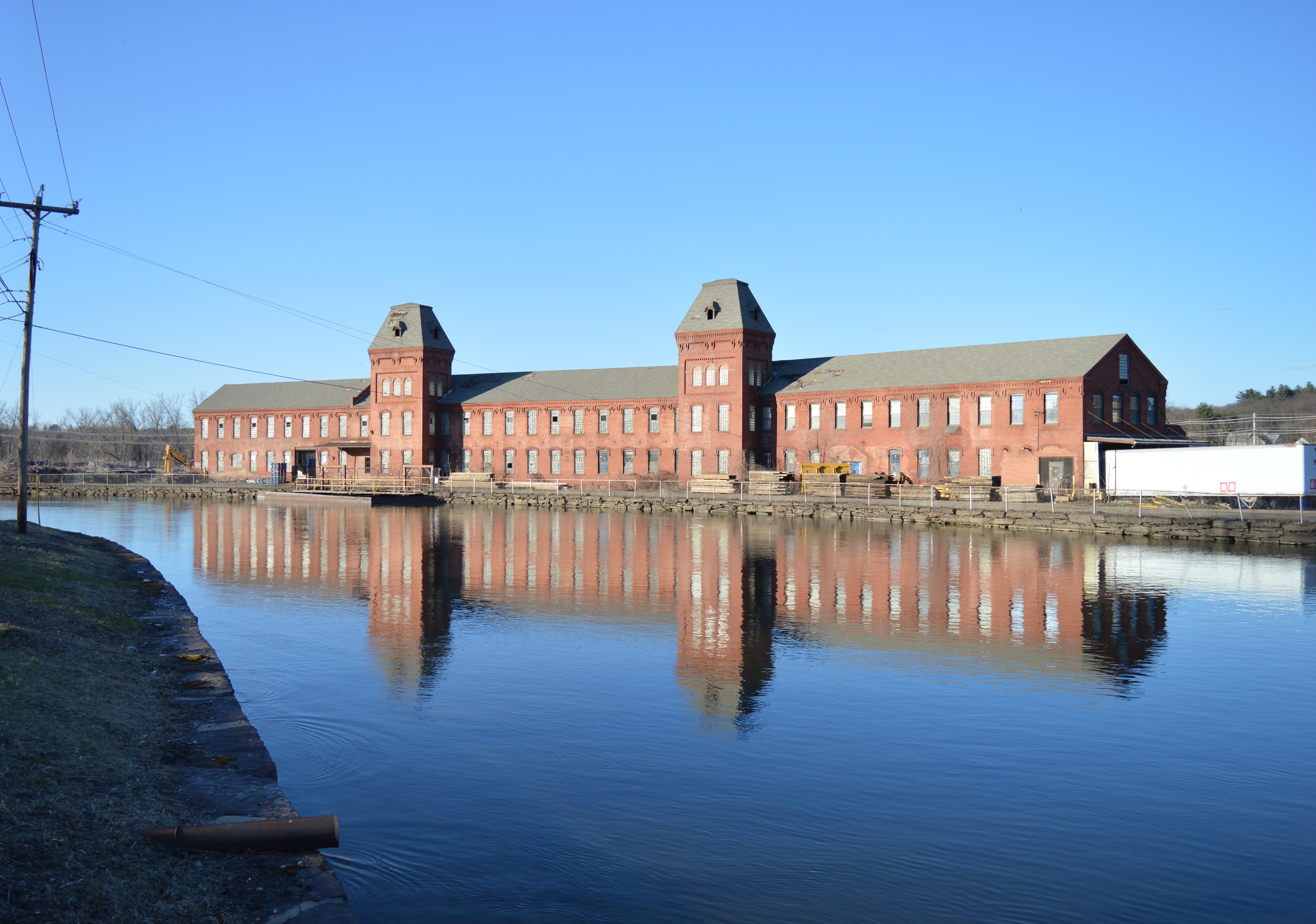
The Albion Paper Mill, designed c. 1869 by David Tower

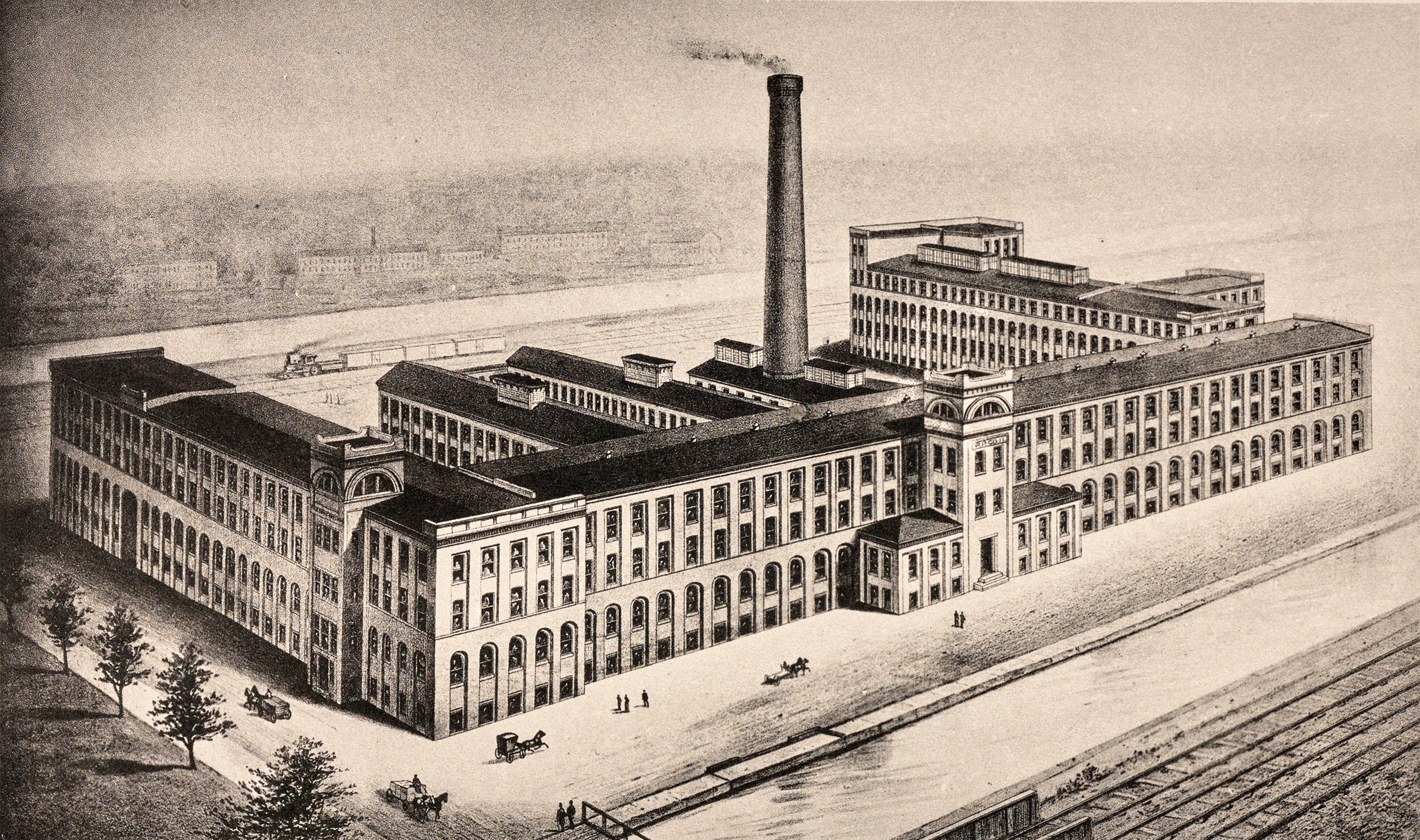
The former Parsons Paper Mill No. 2; built in 1888, it was the last paper producer (several converters still remain) in the city of Holyoke. Closing in 2005, it burned in 2008, and the site was redeveloped in 2016 into a solar panel complex.

- Springfield Paper Company Mill, Rainbow, Connecticut (1864), D. H. Tower
- Albion Paper Mill, Holyoke, Massachusetts (1869, demolished 2018), D. H. Tower
- Whiting Paper Company Mill No. 2, Holyoke, Massachusetts (1869)
- Orono Pulp & Paper Mill, Orono, Maine (c. 1872)
- C. H. Dexter & Sons, Windsor Locks, Connecticut (1874), D. H. Tower
- Delaney & Munson Manufacturing Co., Unionville, Connecticut (1874)
- Chemical Paper Company Mill, Holyoke, Massachusetts (1880), now main manufacturing plant of the Hazen Paper Company
- Fairchild Paper Company Mill, Pepperell, Massachusetts (1880)
- Southworth Mittineague Mill, West Springfield, Massachusetts (1880, demolished)
- Winona Paper Mill, Holyoke, Massachusetts (1880, demolished c. 2014)
- Nonotuck Paper Mill, Holyoke, Massachusetts (1881, demolished c. 2011)
- Hampden Glazed Paper and Card Company, Holyoke, Massachusetts (1882), still in operation under original business
- George R. Dickinson Mill, Holyoke, Massachusetts (1882)
- A.S. Newcomb & Co. Mill, High Falls, New York (1883)
- Glens Falls Paper Company, Glens Falls, New York (1884), D. H. Tower; now site of Finch Paper
- Ticonderoga Paper and Pulp Mills, Ticonderoga, New York (c. 1884)
- Melchert & Cia - Fábrica de Papel de Salto, Salto, São Paulo, Brazil (1887), the first industrial paper mill in South America
- Parsons Paper Mill No. 2, Holyoke, Massachusetts (1888, demolished 2016)
- Hollywood Mill, Richmond, Virginia (1888)
- Denver Paper Mills Company, Denver, Colorado (c. 1890), manufacturing facilities constructed for James H. Platt Jr.
- Kimberly-Clark Mills, Appleton, Wisconsin (1890)
- Madison Paper Mill, Madison, Maine (1890)
- Centralia Pulp Mill, Centralia, Wisconsin (1891), A. B. Tower and N. M. Edwards
- Shattuck and Babcock Paper Mill, De Pere, Wisconsin (1892)
- Norman Paper Company Mill, Holyoke, Massachusetts (1892)
- Montague Paper Company, Turners Falls, Massachusetts (1896) now known as Southworth Turners Falls Mill
- William Cole Paper Mill, Putney, Vermont (c. 1897, rebuilt on site of Cole's previous mill), Joseph Wallace's first job, supervised by A. B. Tower
- Fletcher Paper Company, Alpena, Michigan (1898)
- James River Falls and Paper Mills, Richmond, Virginia (1899)
- Oxford Paper Mills, Rumford, Maine (c. 1900), A. B. Tower; Tower & Wallace
- Ste. Marie Pulp & Paper Co, Sault Ste. Marie, Ontario, (1900) A. B. Tower; Tower & Wallace
- Rising Paper Mill, Housatonic, Massachusetts (c. 1900, expansion/reorganization)
- Nekonegan Paper Mill, Old Town, Maine

=== Civic and commercial projects ===
- Hinsdale Municipal Waterworks, Hinsdale, Massachusetts (1889)
- Cavalry Cemetery, Holyoke, Massachusetts (1882), A. B. Tower
- Egypt Reservoir Dam, Dalton, Massachusetts (1894), D. H. Tower
- Hampden County Jail, Springfield, Massachusetts (1886, demolished c. 2011)
- Deane Steam Pump Company, Holyoke, Massachusetts (c. 1890)
- The Massasoit, Holyoke, Massachusetts (1891), A. B. Tower
- Thomas Hill Standpipe, Bangor, Maine (1897), A. B. Tower; Tower & Wallace

== See also ==
- History of papermaking in Massachusetts
