= Parsons Paper Company =

American pulp and paper company

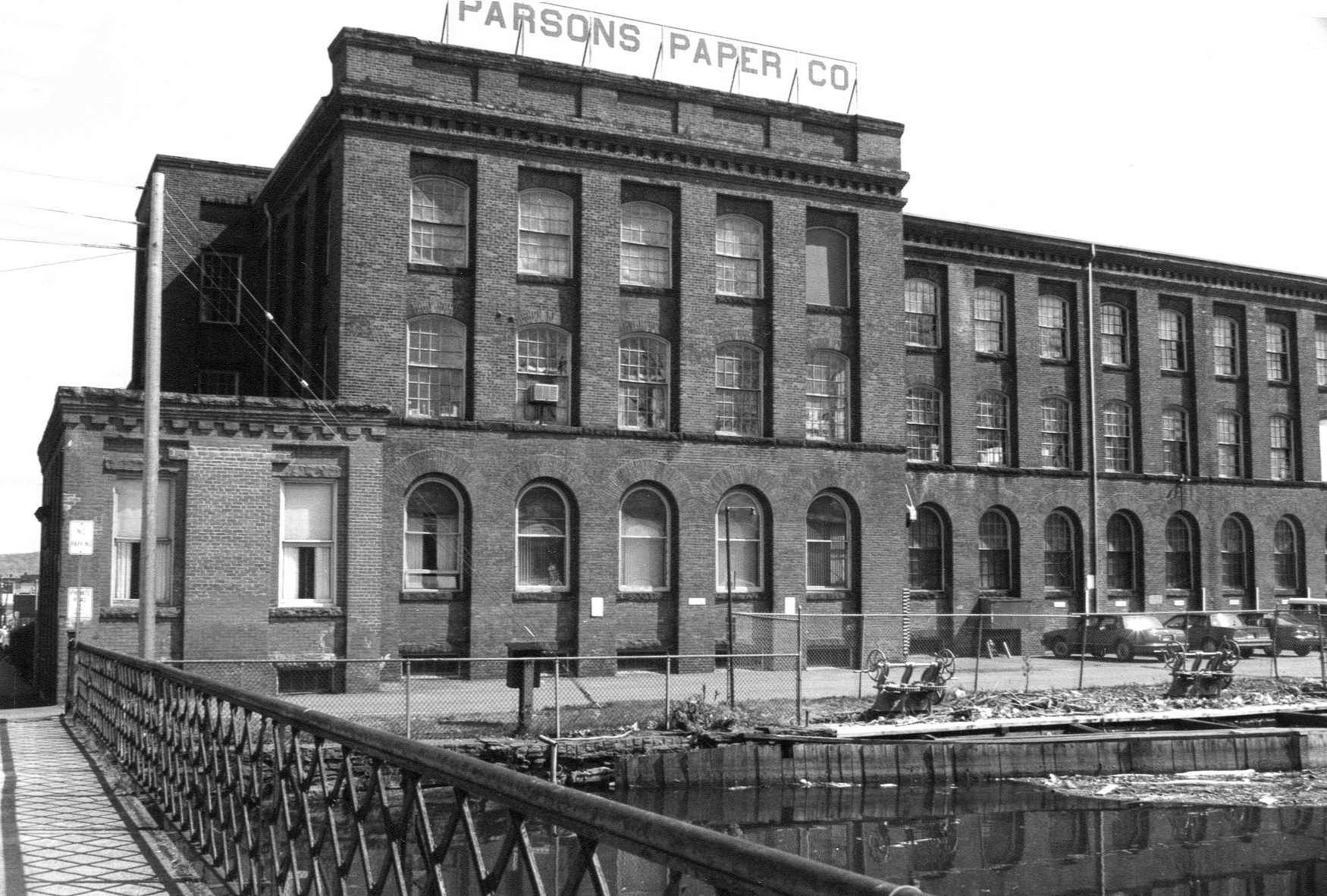
- Parsons Paper Mill No. 2, c. 1978
- Company type: Division
- Industry: Pulp and paper
- Founded: May 14, 1853; 173 years ago
- Founder: Joseph C. Parsons
- Defunct: April 2005
- Headquarters: 80 Sargeant Street, Holyoke, Massachusetts, United States
- Area served: Worldwide
- Parent: National Vulcanized Fiber
- Website: nvf.com/parsons.html

The Parsons Paper Company was an American pulp and paper company specializing in cotton-based fine writing papers, based in Holyoke, Massachusetts. Founded in 1853 by Joseph C. Parsons, it was the first and, as of 2026, the last paper manufacturer extant in that city, (Note: Other manufacturers such as paper converters and paperboard manufacuteres remain extant in the city, but no Holyoke companies as of 2026 render paper from pulp.) from 1989 until its liquidation in 2005. In 2008 the company's primary mill was razed in a large suspected arson fire.

== History ==
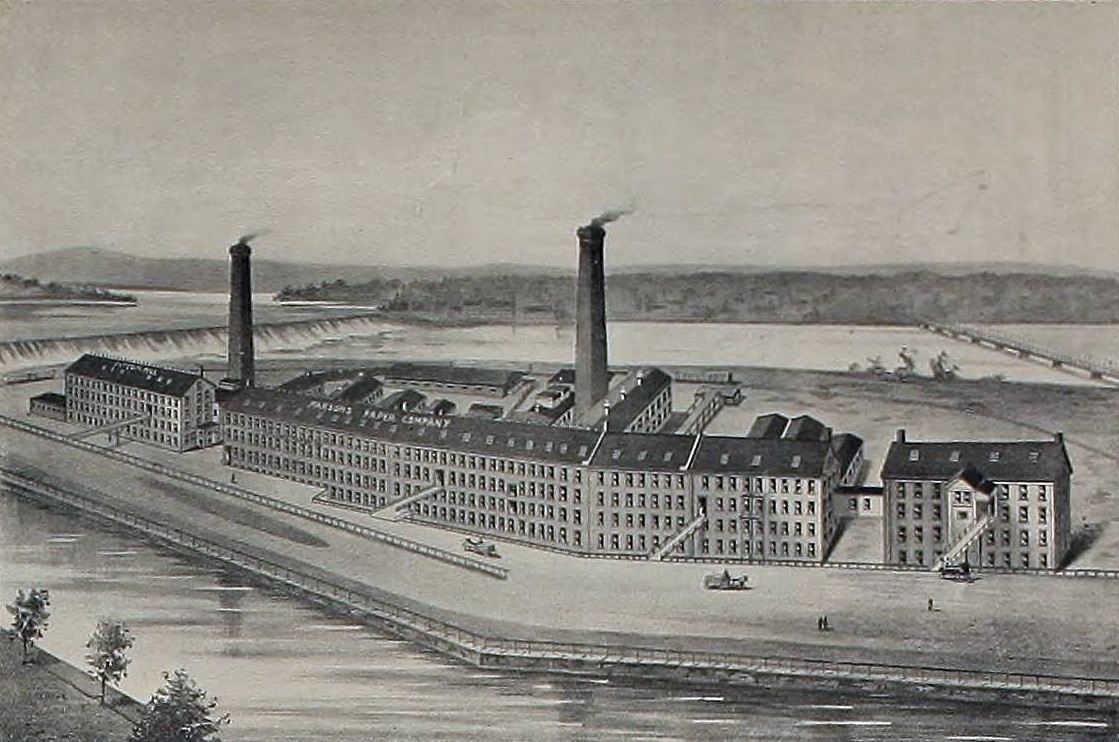
The first mill of the Parsons Paper Company, with expansions, c. 1897

Founded by its namesake Joseph C. Parsons in 1853, the company was established with $60,000 in capital and initially met resistance from the Hadley Falls Company which established Holyoke, as they only had one mill site at that time and regarded a small paper company as poor use of their new canal system, arguing a textile mill would generate more jobs and revenue. Indeed, the prevailing wisdom of the Boston Associates and their colleagues at the time indicated that writing paper could not be sold in the quantities that Parsons aimed to produce it, and the belief was held that it would only drive down prices and leave a surplus in the market. The very first batches of paper made by Parsons were produced using a 62" Fourdrinier machine by Goddard Rice & Co. of Worcester, and derived from rags from Boynton & Whitcomb of Templeton, driven to Holyoke by four-horse teams. Almost immediately the concerns of the Boston Associates proved unfounded, as within 10 months of the company's founding it had produced and sold $50,000 worth of fine writing paper and by 1859 expanded into a second mill. By the time of the Civil War, the company had become the largest writing and envelope paper producer in the United States.

By 1887 Parsons had reached an international market, selling its bristol board, envelope paper, and ledger bonds to customers across the United States as well as in South America and Australia. One business strategy which had in part allowed the company to see such growth was its greater public exposure through federal government contracts. In the early 1880s J. S. McElwain, effectively the manager of the company, managed to persuade the elder Joseph Parsons to place bids for government envelope and postcard contracts. McElwain would go on to establish his own paper company to adapt to a changing market, however the contracts that he had proposed for Parsons had allowed the company to vastly expand its production volume and brought with it widespread free publicity. The company would fill many contracts for the US government in subsequent decades, including one for a display of drawings at the World's Columbian Exposition.

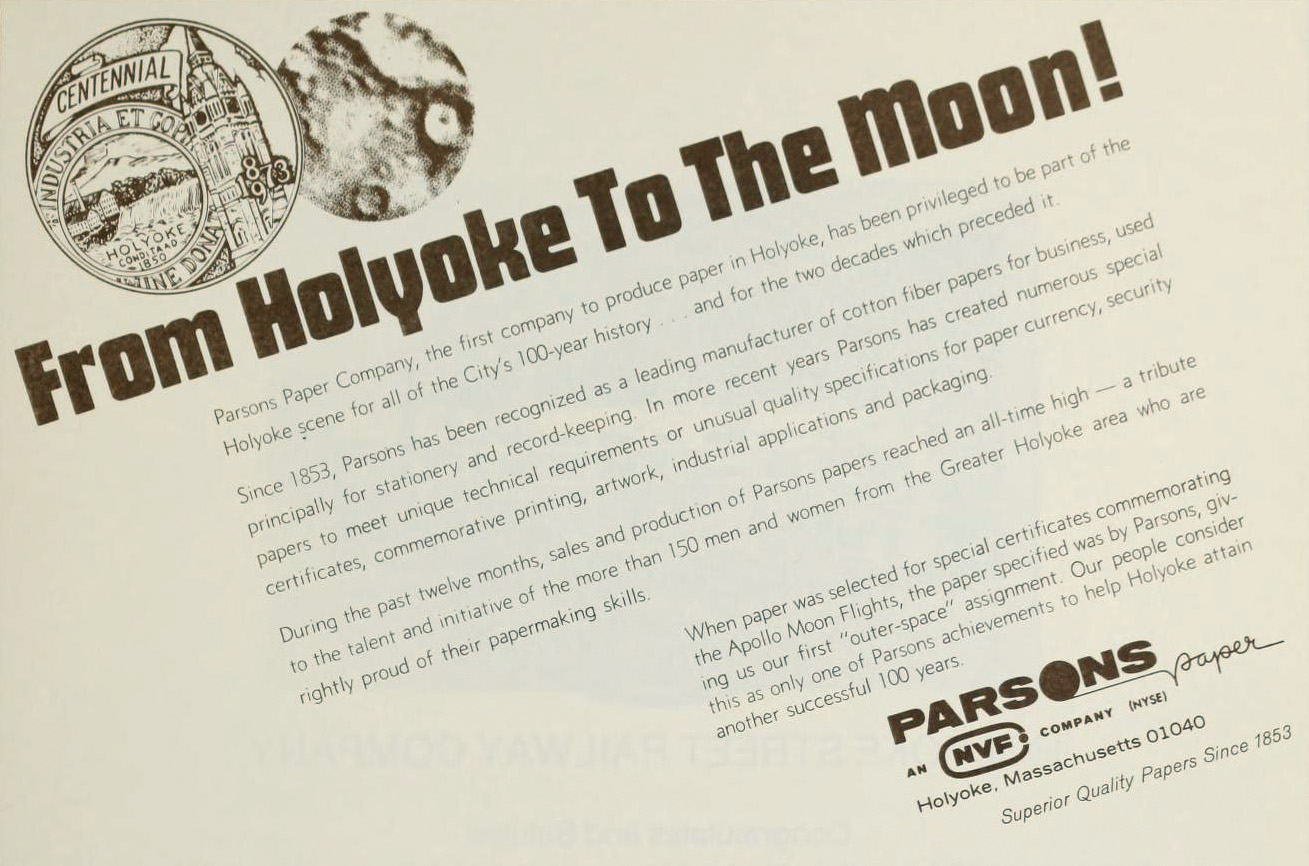
A 1974 advertisement touting a company contract for commemorative certificates for NASA's Apollo program

20th century logo of the Parsons Paper Company

In 1888 the company contracted millwrights D. H. & A. B. Tower to construct the mill which characterized the company until its final years in the 21st century. With the establishment of Parsons Paper Mill No. 2, came Parsons Paper Company No. 2, a corporation with $300,000 in capital, of which $200,000 was supplied by the original company, and the remainder from working men in its ranks. Originally separated as a part of a negotiation with McElwain to allow certain long-time employees to buy into the company stock, ultimately it was this second iteration of the company which would endure into the twentieth and twenty-first centuries, as the former Parsons Paper No. 1 and its assets would be absorbed with a number of other Holyoke paper concerns into the ill-fated American Writing Paper Company trust in 1899.

On February 12, 1959, the company and its assets were purchased by National Vulcanized Fiber, which continued to operate it as a subsidiary until its closure in April 2005.

On June 9, 2008, a large fire burned down two sections of the mill accounting for approximately 50% of the interconnected structure. Two teenagers were arrested and charged with third-degree arson and second-degree criminal trespassing following the incident.
