= Rising Paper Mill =

- U.S. National Register of Historic Places
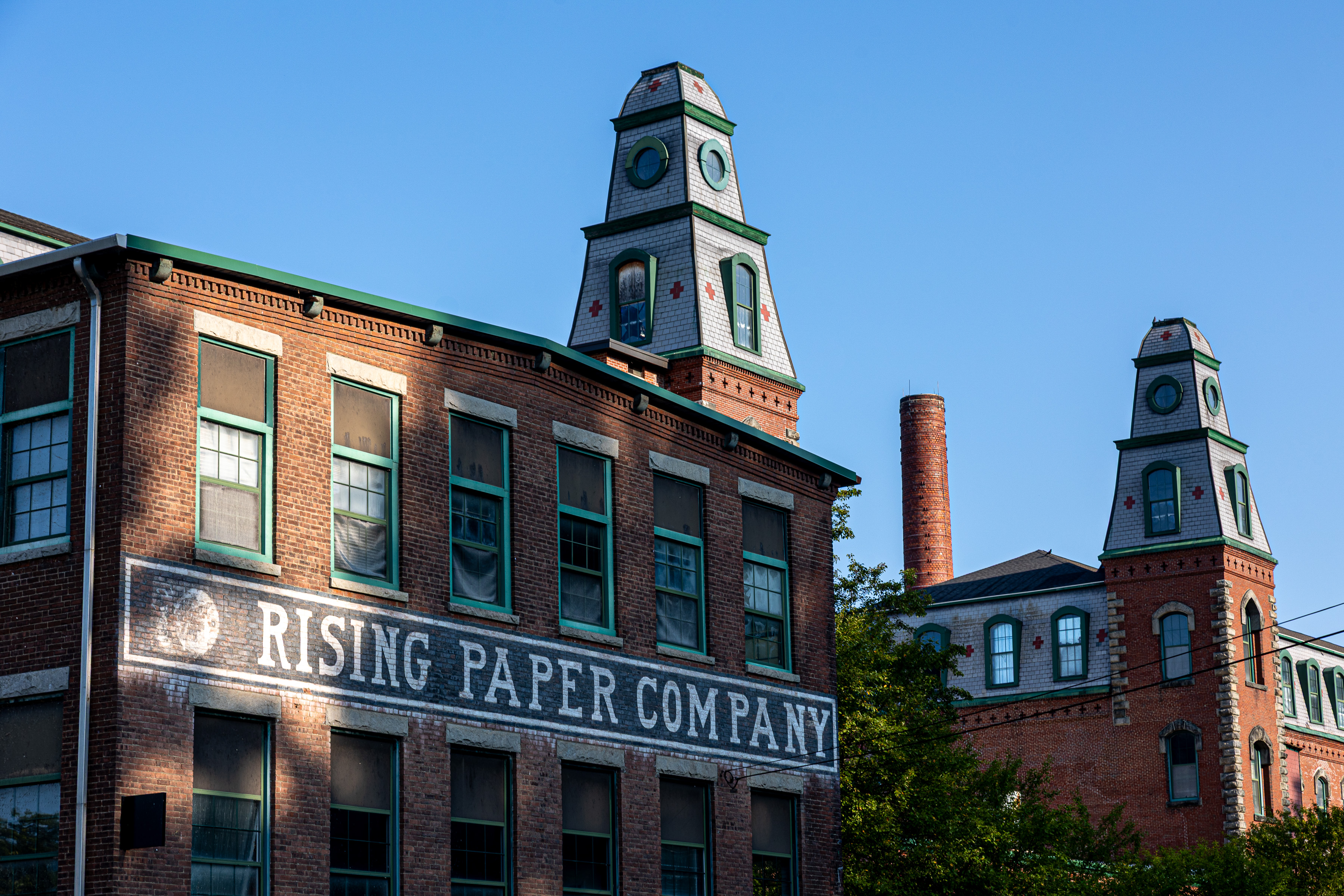
- Rising Paper Mill

- Location within Massachusetts Location within the United States
- Location: 295 Park St. S, Great Barrington, Massachusetts
- Coordinates: 42°14′28″N 73°21′28″W
- Area: 30 acres (12 ha)
- Built: 1873
- Architect: H.D. Cone
- NRHP reference No.: 75000253
- Added to NRHP: August 11, 1975

The Rising Paper Mill is a historic factory at 295 Park Street North, in the Housatonic village of Great Barrington, Massachusetts. Built in 1873 for H.D. Cone, it is one of the best-preserved examples of period mill architecture in Berkshire County. The complex was listed on the National Register of Historic Places in 1975. In 2008, the facility was purchased by Hazen Paper, which announced plans to manufacture multi-ply laminated paper for packaging.

== Description and history ==
The Rising Paper Mill is located south of the village of Housatonic, on the east bank of the Housatonic River near the junction of Massachusetts Route 183 (Park Street) and Mountain Road. The complex covers about 30 acres (12 ha), with significant frontage on both the river and the road. The facility's dam is located near the north end of the property. It consists of two long three-story brick buildings, which are joined near their centers by a narrower section. The north block is 212 feet (65 m) and 21 bays in length, while the south block is 145 feet (44 m) and 14 bays in length. The buildings are covered by mansarded slate roofs, and have elaborate mansarded towers at the corners. The corners are finished with rusticated granite quoining, and there are bands of decorative Greek crosses below the eaves.

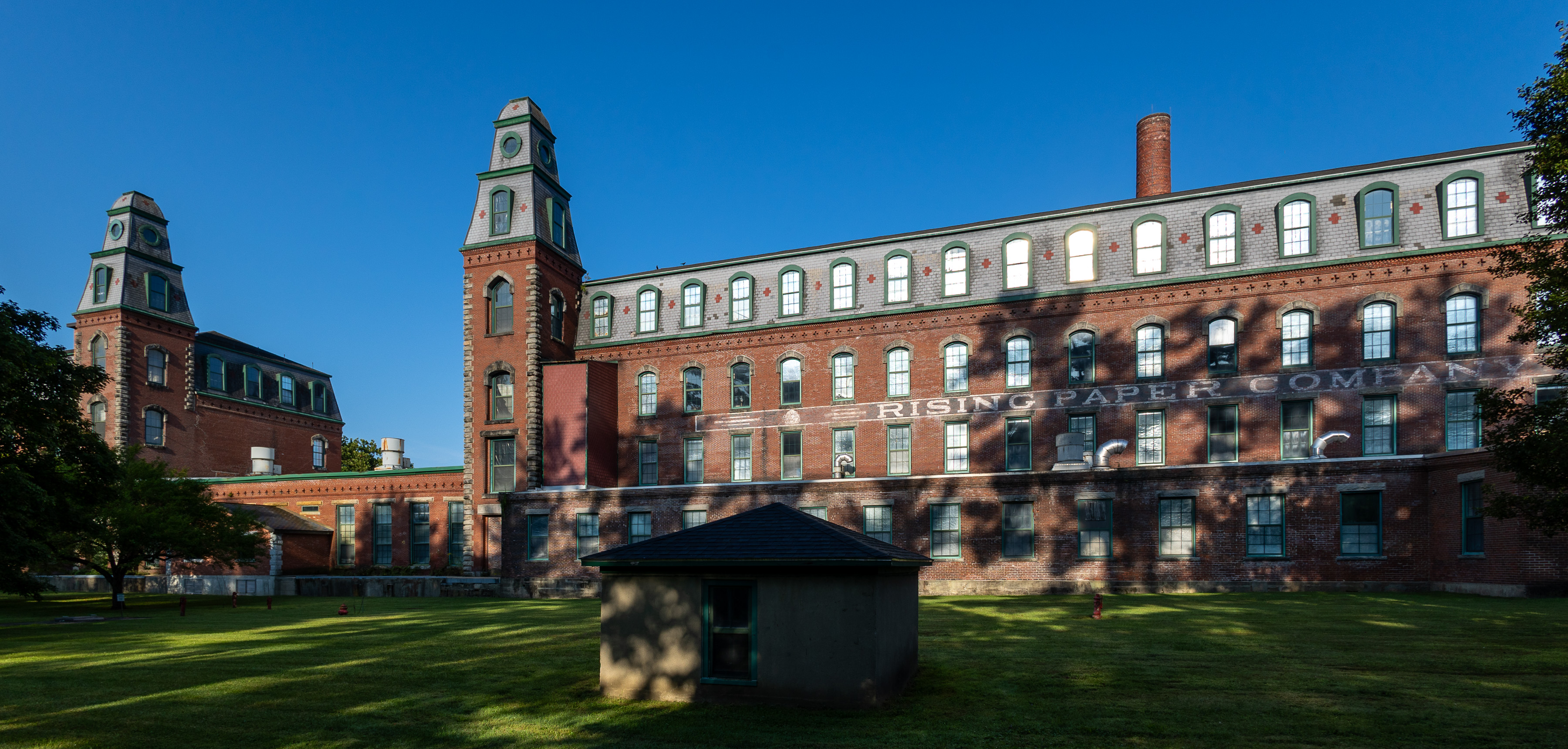
Rising Paper Company Mills, Housatonic, Massachusetts

The mill was built in about 1873 for H.D. Cone, whose intention it was to build the world's largest paper factory. The buildings are built with exceptionally strong foundations, needed for the heavy machinery used in the papermaking process. Granite for its foundations were quarried at nearby Monument Mountain. The design of the building placed the key Foudrinier machines in the hyphen joining the two main structures, one of which was devoted to the preparation of materials, and the other to finishing the paper.

The mill was not entirely finished by Cone, who went bankrupt soon after its construction due to a variety of financial reverses. It sat vacant until the turn of the 20th century, when it was purchased by the B.D. Rising Company, which used it to make paper. The Rising Mill became the area's largest employer after the nearby Monument Mills failed in the 1930s.

== See also ==
- National Register of Historic Places listings in Berkshire County, Massachusetts
