= Ampad =

Manufacturer of office products

American Pad & Paper LLC
- Type: Limited liability company
- Industry: Manufacturing
- Founded: 1888 in Holyoke, Massachusetts
- Headquarters: Richardson, Texas, U.S.
- Key people: Donald Meltzer, President and CEO Ed Byrne, VP & CFO Mark Koepsel, VP Operations
- Products: Office paper products
- Owner: TOPS Products
- Website: www.ampad.com

American Pad & Paper LLC, or Ampad, is a manufacturer of office products, including writing pads, specialty papers, filing products and envelopes. Some products are marketed under the Ampad brand name, others are produced for brands including Staples and Wal-Mart. The company makes over 2500 products, including pads in a variety of sizes, paper grades, colors, and bindings. Its headquarters are located in Richardson, Texas, United States, with four factories in North America, including facilities in the United States and a plant in Matamoros, Tamaulipas, Mexico.

== History ==
=== Founding ===
Ampad was founded in 1888 by Thomas W. Holley, a paper mill employee, in Holyoke, Massachusetts. At the time, Holyoke was a major papermaking center. Holley began purchasing the rejects, or "sortings", from local paper mills, cutting the paper, inscribing rules on it, and binding it into pads which he could sell at a discount. Within a year, Holley's business filled a whole floor of a commercial building on Holyoke's Main Street. By 1894, the business grew to occupy an entire building, at the corner of Winter and Appleton Streets in Holyoke, and in 1909, the size of its facilities there were nearly doubled. By the end of World War II, the company had expanded outside of Massachusetts and established international footholds.

=== Growth, acquisition, bankruptcy and reorganization ===
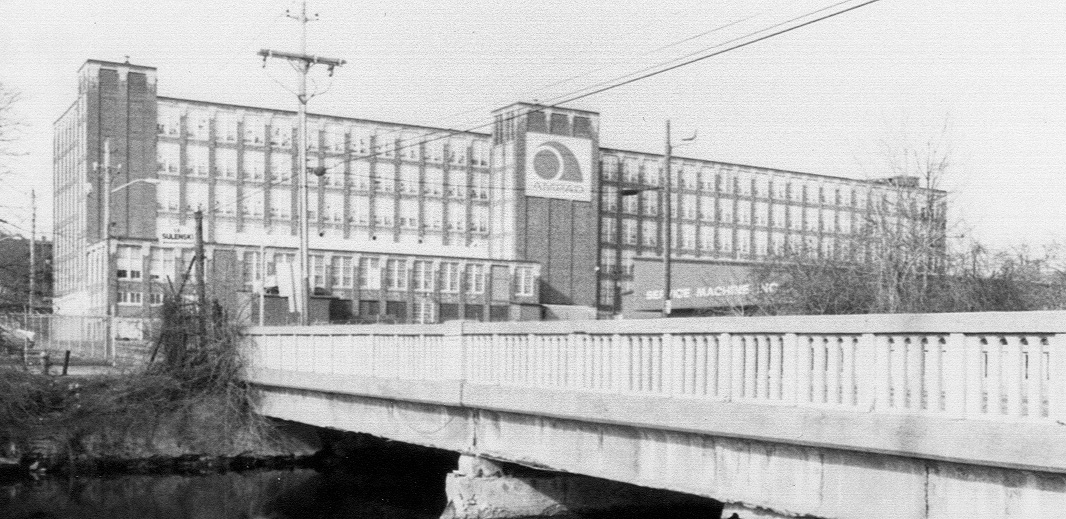
One of several Ampad facilities in Holyoke, prior to consolidation and relocation, 1990

Known as the Ampad Holding Corporation, the company was purchased in 1986 by the Mead Corporation. In 1992, the newly formed holding company American Pad & Paper and Bain Capital purchased the subsidiary from Mead. Upon its formation, American Pad & Paper consolidated its 13 manufacturing and distribution facilities into six in 21 locations in the US. At the time, the company had more than 3,700,000 square feet (340,000 m^{2}) of production and warehouse space in California, Colorado, Georgia, Illinois, Massachusetts, Mississippi, New Jersey, New York, Ohio, Pennsylvania, Tennessee, Texas, Washington, and Wisconsin.

The company continued to enjoy 53 percent compound annual growth in net sales, which increased from $8.8 million in 1992 to $200.5 million in 1996, when the company became publicly traded. The company made a number of acquisitions, including writing products company SCM in July 1994, brand names from the American Trading and Production Corporation in August 1995, WR Acquisition and the Williamhouse-Regency Division of Delaware, Inc. in October, 1995, Niagara Envelope Company, Inc. in 1996, and Shade/Allied, Inc. in February 1997.

On January 8, 1999, unable to sustain profitability, the company announced it would be delisted from the New York Stock Exchange. After filing for Chapter 11 bankruptcy protection, Ampad was acquired in 2003 by an affiliate of Crescent Capital Investments, later renamed Arcapita. Ampad's current president and CEO, Donald Meltzer, joined the company in August 2005, having formerly served as vice president and general manager of the Roofing Systems Group at Johns-Manville, and before that as the executive vice president and COO of Clore Automotive.

On June 8, 2010 Ampad was acquired by Esselte. In July 2014, it was sold to TOPS Products.

On January 25, 2021, the company was the focus of attention for the dismissal of workers who demanded a fair salary increase and intimidation of administrative personnel, thus violating the clients' policies of respect for workers, good remuneration, excessive working hours

=== Legal pad claim ===
The company claims its founder, Thomas W. Holley, invented the legal pad, and no other company has challenged this claim; however, no patent was filed for the invention, and details of the invention are largely absent, including the reason for the pads' yellow color, which costs 10 to 20 percent more than plain white to produce.
