= American Writing Paper Company =

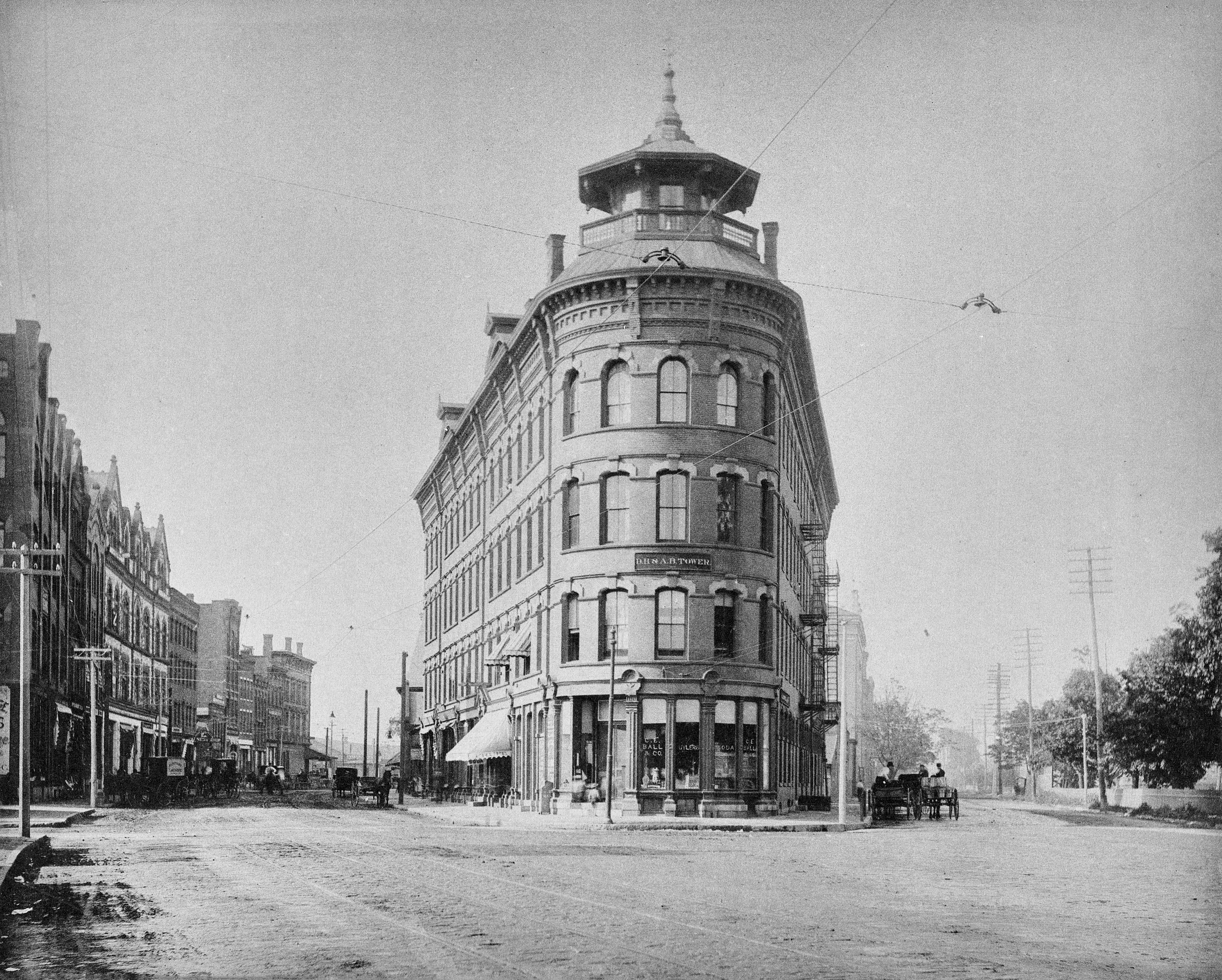
- The "Flatiron Building"; originally offices for Parsons Paper Company, it was the AWPC's headquarters from 1899-1952, when it was razed
- Industry: Pulp and paper
- Founded: 1899
- Fate: Assets liquidated, 1963–1970; "Eagle A" brand and mfg. sold to the Brown Company subsidiary of Gulf and Western Industries, 1970, brand subsequently sold to Fox River Paper Company, 1976; "Eagle A" brand acquired by Neenah Paper, 2007; discontinued
- Successors: Holyoke Shares, Inc. (1962-1970)
- Headquarters: Holyoke, Massachusetts, United States
- Area served: Worldwide

The American Writing Paper Company was an American pulp and paper producing company trust, primarily manufacturing printing and writing paper. Incorporated in New Jersey in 1899 and representing the merging of 23 rag paper mills, the company held its general offices in Holyoke, Massachusetts which was also the location of 13 of these mills. At its peak output American Writing Paper produced 75% of all fine papers in the United States; contemporary accounts describe it as the largest producer of fine papers in the world.

The company's failings have been described by historical scholars, including Constance McLaughlin Green, as a matter of a lack of technical expertise in management. Rather than forming from within the paper industry, “both the original promoters [of the trust] and the final agents were brokers and not paper manufacturers. The result was that these men were primarily interested in marketing the stocks and bonds, and not one was concerned with the manufacture of paper.” Initially the company board sought papermaker and former congressman William Whiting II to serve as its chief executive. Whiting declined their offer, and indeed the company was unable to absorb his own namesake company, which would become the largest independent manufacturer of writing paper in the United States contemporarily with the trust.

The American Writing Paper Company would endure multiple labor strikes and two bankruptcies before being entirely liquidated under the name "Holyoke Shares", beginning with reorganization as an investment company under that name in 1963, dissolving by the end of 1970. Today it is best known for its "Eagle A" brand which has since been sold to multiple successors, until it was discontinued in 2007 by the Neenah Paper Company.

== Merged properties ==
The mills and properties which the company assumed included but were not limited to-

- Agawam Paper Company
- Albion Paper Company
- Beebe & Holbrook Paper Company
- Crocker-McElwain
- George R. Dickinson Paper Company
- G. K. Baird Paper Company
- Holyoke Paper Company
- Linden Paper Company
- Mount Tom Paper Company
- Nonotuck Paper Company
- Norman Paper Company
- Oakland Mill, Butler and Hudson
- Parsons Paper (No. 1)
- Platner and Porter Manufacturing Company
- Riverside Paper Company
- Wauregan Paper Company

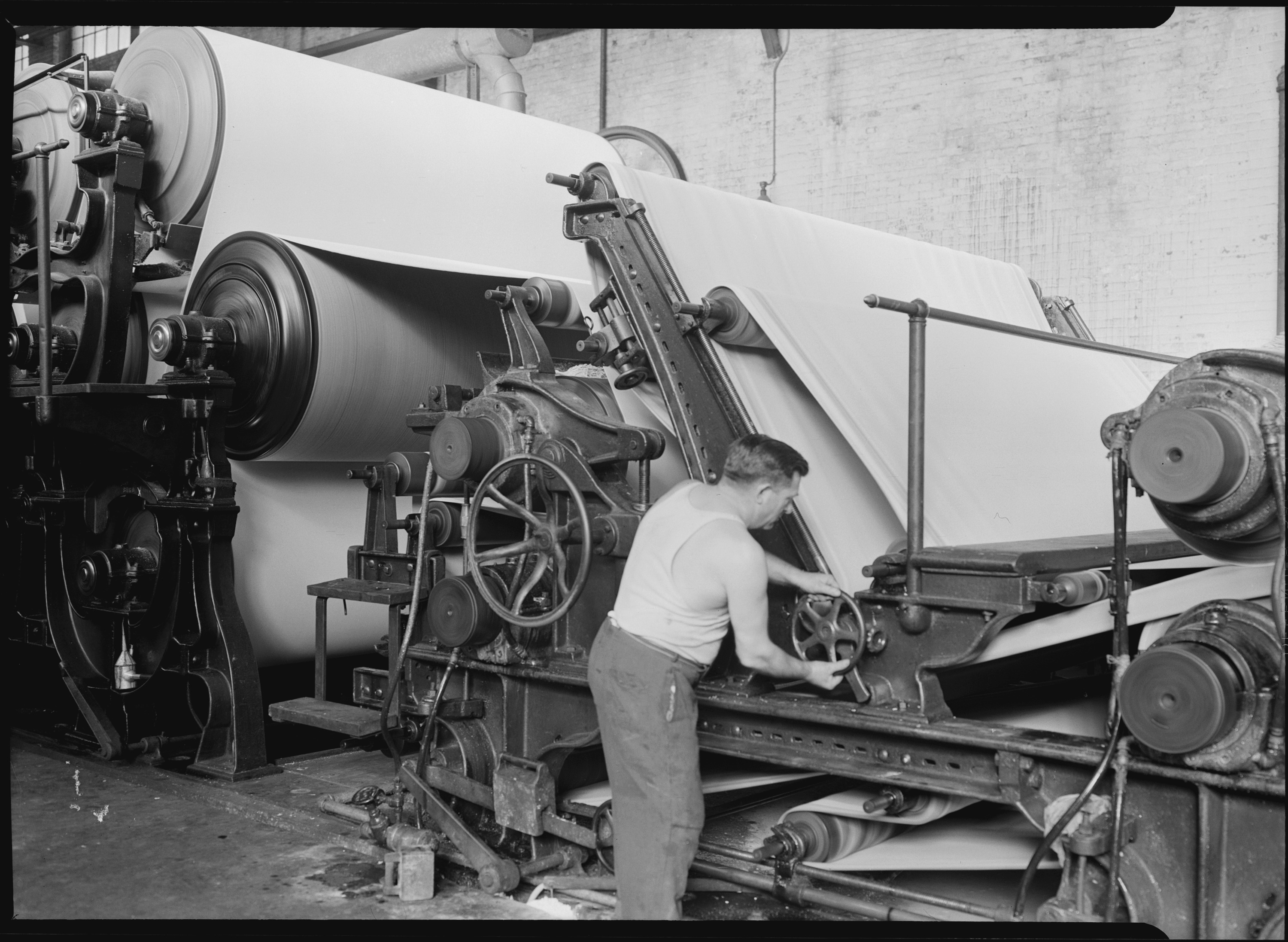
An American Writing line worker adjusts tension on calender at the drying end of a Fourdrinier machine, c. 1937.

== See also ==
- American Pad and Paper Company
- International Paper, competitor, and present largest producer of paper and pulp in the world; whose founding chief engineer was an apprentice of D. H. & A. B. Tower, the architectural firm of the majority of American Writing Paper's mills
