= The Student Prince (restaurant) =

German restaurant in Springfield, Massachusetts, U.S.

Coordinates: 42°6′13.2″N 72°35′37.1″W

The Student Prince Cafe & Fort Restaurant

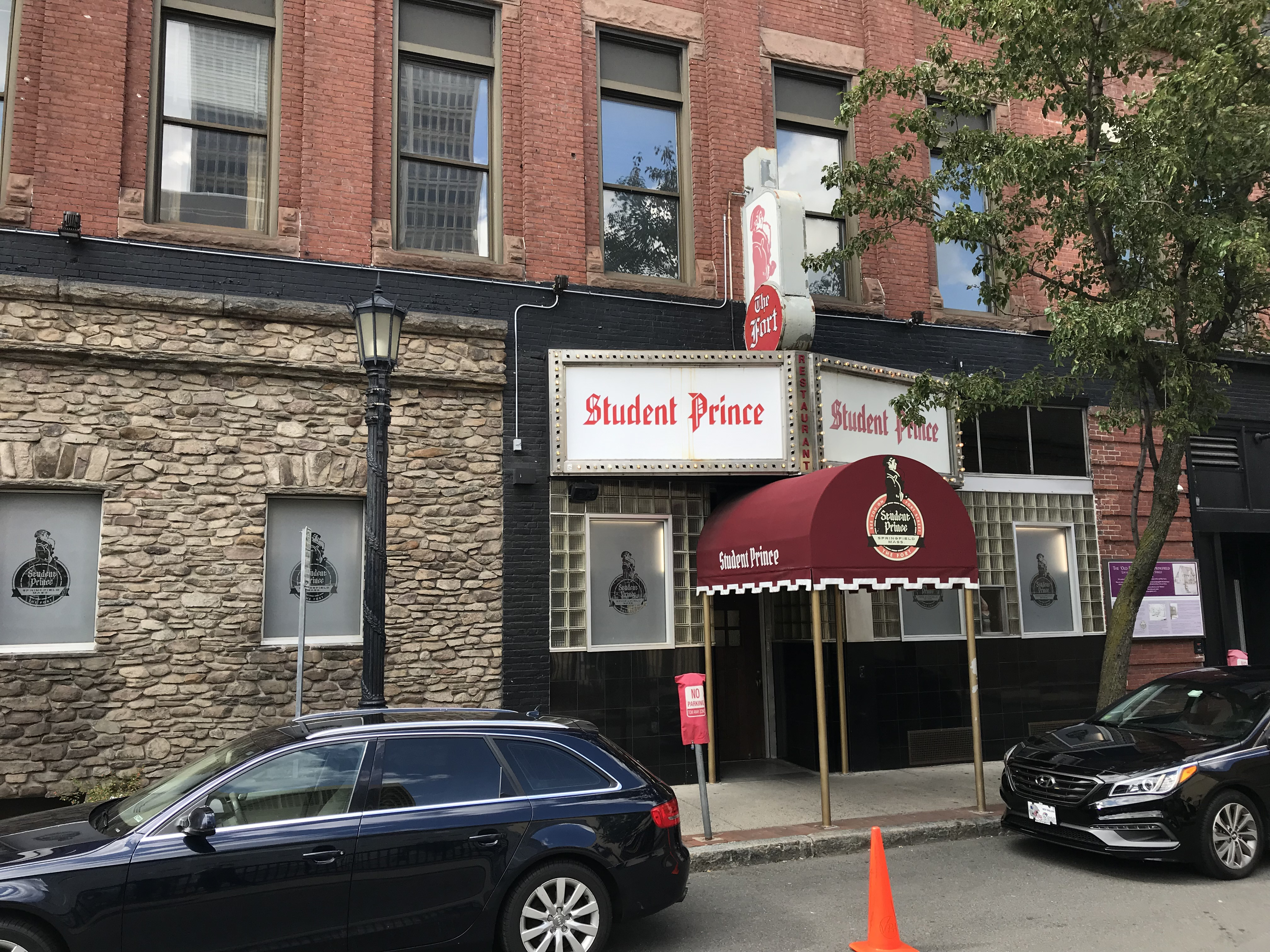
- Fort Street façade of The Student Prince, set up for valet parking
- Interactive map of The Student Prince Cafe & Fort Restaurant

Restaurant information
- Established: 1935
- Owners: Bean Restaurant Group; Peter Picknelly
- Previous owner: Rudi Scherff
- Head chef: Timothy Saxer
- Food type: German, American
- Dress code: Casual
- Location: 8 Fort Street, Springfield, MA 01103
- Reservations: Yes
- Other locations: Seasonally at The Big E; "Wurst Haus", Northampton, MA (2020-2025); "Wurst Haus", West Hartford, CT (2021-2023)
- Website: www.studentprince.com

The Student Prince Cafe & The Fort Restaurant, commonly referred to as The Student Prince, is a German restaurant, established in 1935, located at the corner of Fort and Main Street in the Metro Center neighborhood of Springfield, Massachusetts. The restaurant has been described by The Boston Globe and The New York Times as a city landmark, and has served German foods and beer in its grand hall for 91 years. Closing briefly from June until November 2014, the restaurant was purchased from longtime owner Rudi Scherff by Peter Picknelly of Peter Pan Bus Lines and Andy Yee, of the former Hu Ke Lau restaurant, in an agreement making them general partners, with Scherff remaining "the face of Student Prince". In 2008, Gourmet listed it among "20 Legendary American Restaurants", among the company of Galatoire's, Locke-Ober, and the Grand Central Oyster Bar & Restaurant.

== History ==
=== The "Old Fort" ===
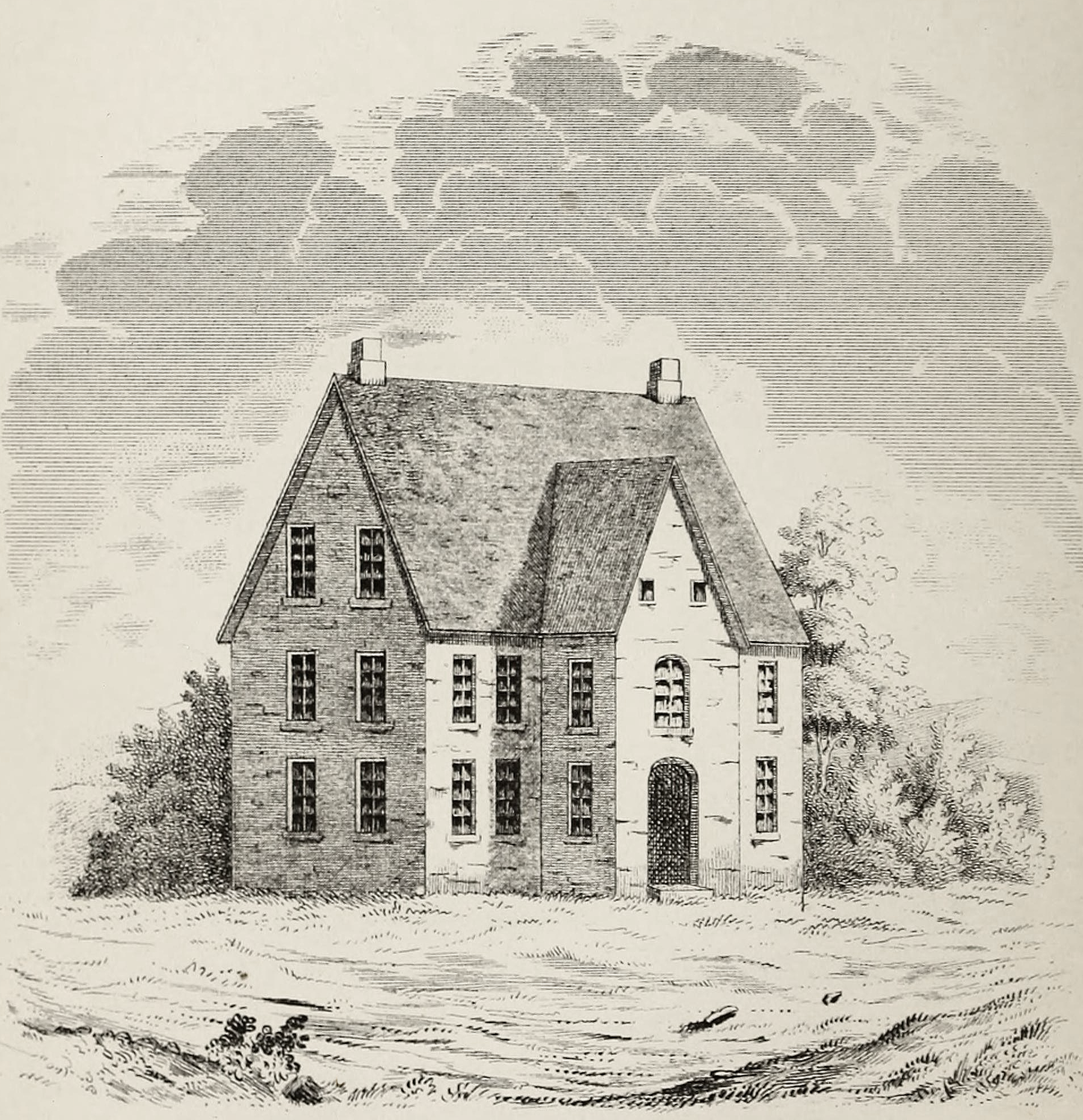
Likeness of the "Old Fort" seen on historical plaques by the restaurant, and on the city seal today

The restaurant today stands on the site of John Pynchon's former estate, known as the "Old Fort", which was the first brick building when it was constructed in 1660, and the only building to survive the Siege of Springfield during King Philip's War. Traditional accounts of Springfield history say that the first city and county records were kept "in the chamber over the porch", and that Commissioner John Pynchon, and associates Elizur Holyoke, and Deacon Samuel Chapin held their court in the parlor before audiences of townsfolk. Toward midnight on a night in October 1675, every room of the house was filled with Springfield's men, women, and children as tribesmen burned every other dwelling to the ground; until the end of the siege it remained the only safehouse in the settlement. Following the rebuilding of Springfield, the homestead, with walls described as more than one foot thick, remained in the Pynchon family until it was razed in 1831 for a "more modern edifice". Today both in the main entrance and at the exterior of the restaurant historical plaques mark the site, and it was for this structure that the establishment lends half of its name, "The Fort Restaurant".

=== Establishment ===
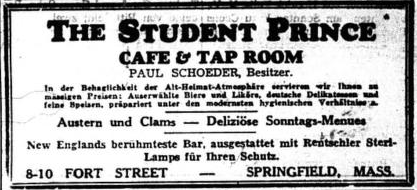
Early advertisement for the restaurant in German, as it appeared in a 1942 issue of the Neu England Rundschau (New England Review)

On September 24, 1935, Paul Schoeder, a German immigrant from Spremberg active in Springfield's turnverein, opened the Student Prince Cafe & Tap Room at 8 Fort Street in the storefront of a former shoe store. At the time of the restaurant's opening, the namesake operetta, The Student Prince, was remarkably popular in Springfield, with annual performances at the Court Square Theater during ten years prior to the establishment's opening, and leading man Howard Marsh making his radio debut as Prince Karl on WTIC in neighboring Hartford. Schoeder would place a two-column ad in the Springfield Republican on opening day which billed the restaurant as "A bit of the charm of the Old World with the modernity of the New...serving German food and delicatessen". With the Springfield newspapers' offices in the same block, the restaurant quickly became a regular meeting place for reporters and politicians such as Edward Boland and Larry O'Brien.

After several years of good business, on February 18, 1946, Schoeder and his business partner Miss Erna Sievers opened The Fort Dining Room, featuring mahogany woodwork and commissioned stained glass made by German artisans from New Jersey, depicting scenes from the restaurant's operetta namesake The Student Prince, Heidelberg, and Springfield history. The restaurant over the years has amassed a collection of more than 1,000 steins and an array of bottle openers and artwork which adorn every one of its walls. The expanded restaurant proved so successful that during the 1950s it was not uncommon for a large line to form at its door on a Thursday before 5 pm, and from 1935 until 1960 the restaurant had to expand its kitchen five times and build a second preparatory kitchen in its basement, larger than its entire seating area.

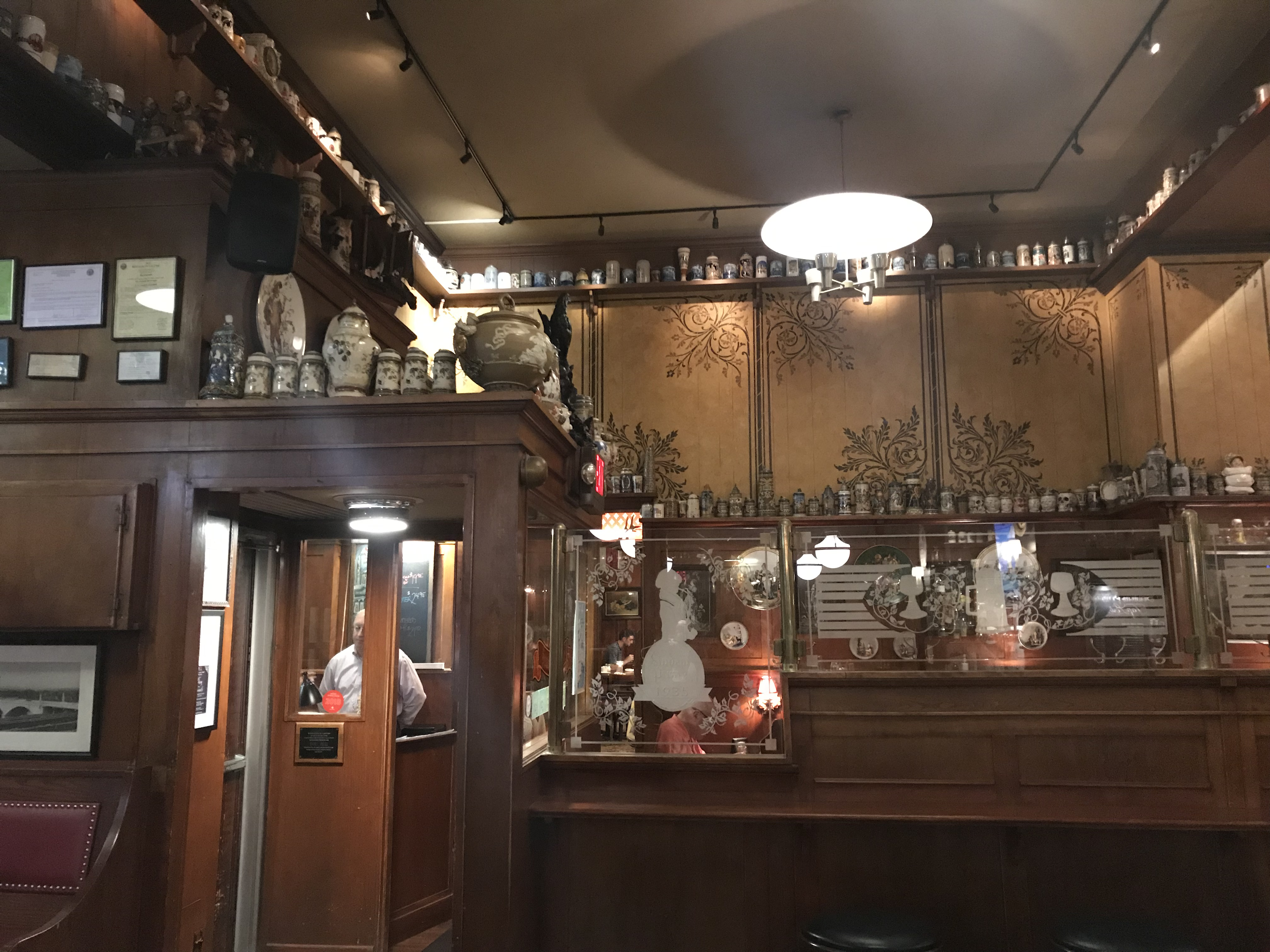
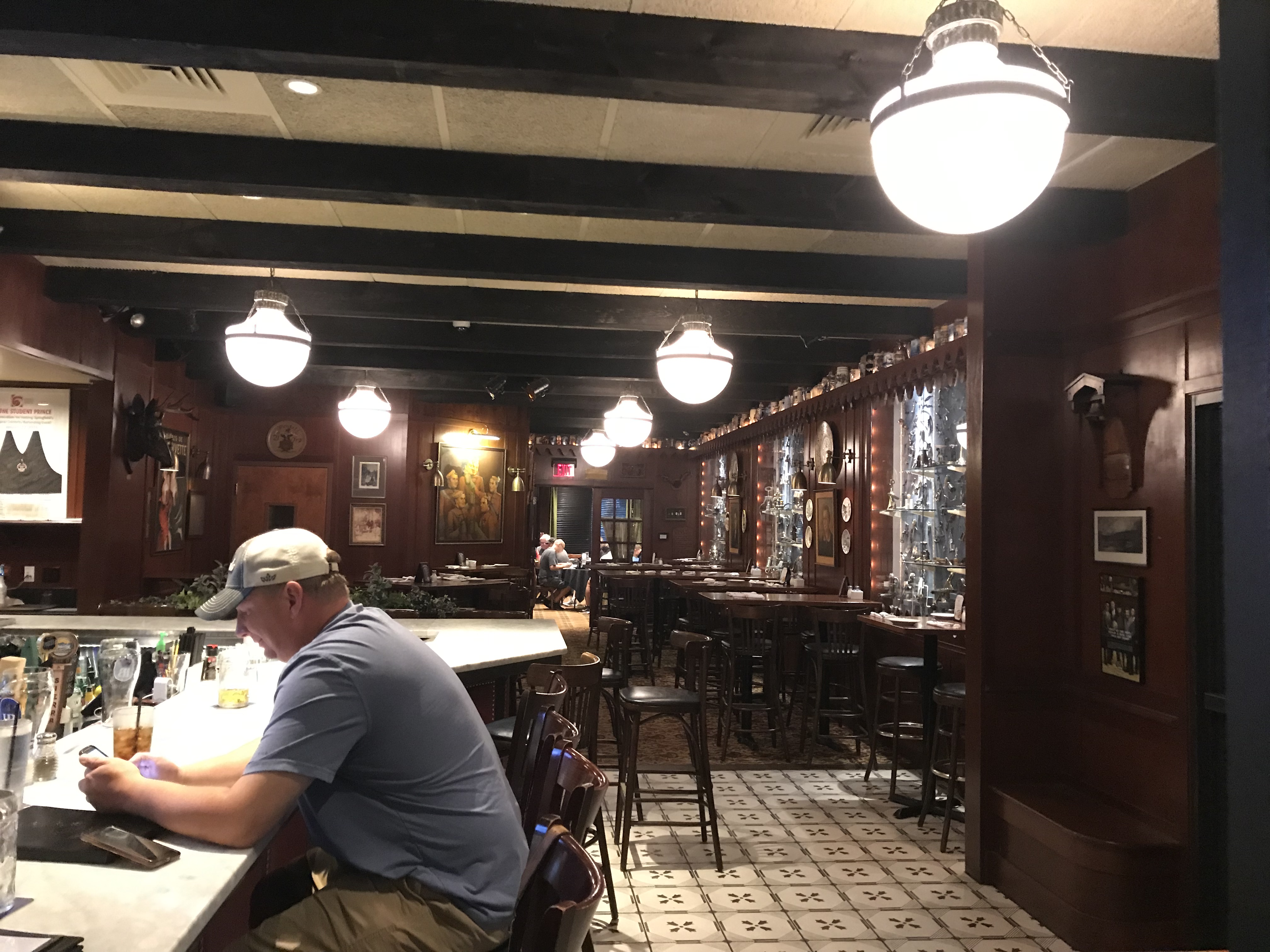
The interior of the main entrance of the Student Prince with its stein collection (top) and bottle-opener collection (bottom, right); not pictured, the 3 other dining rooms, including the Heidelberg and Fort rooms

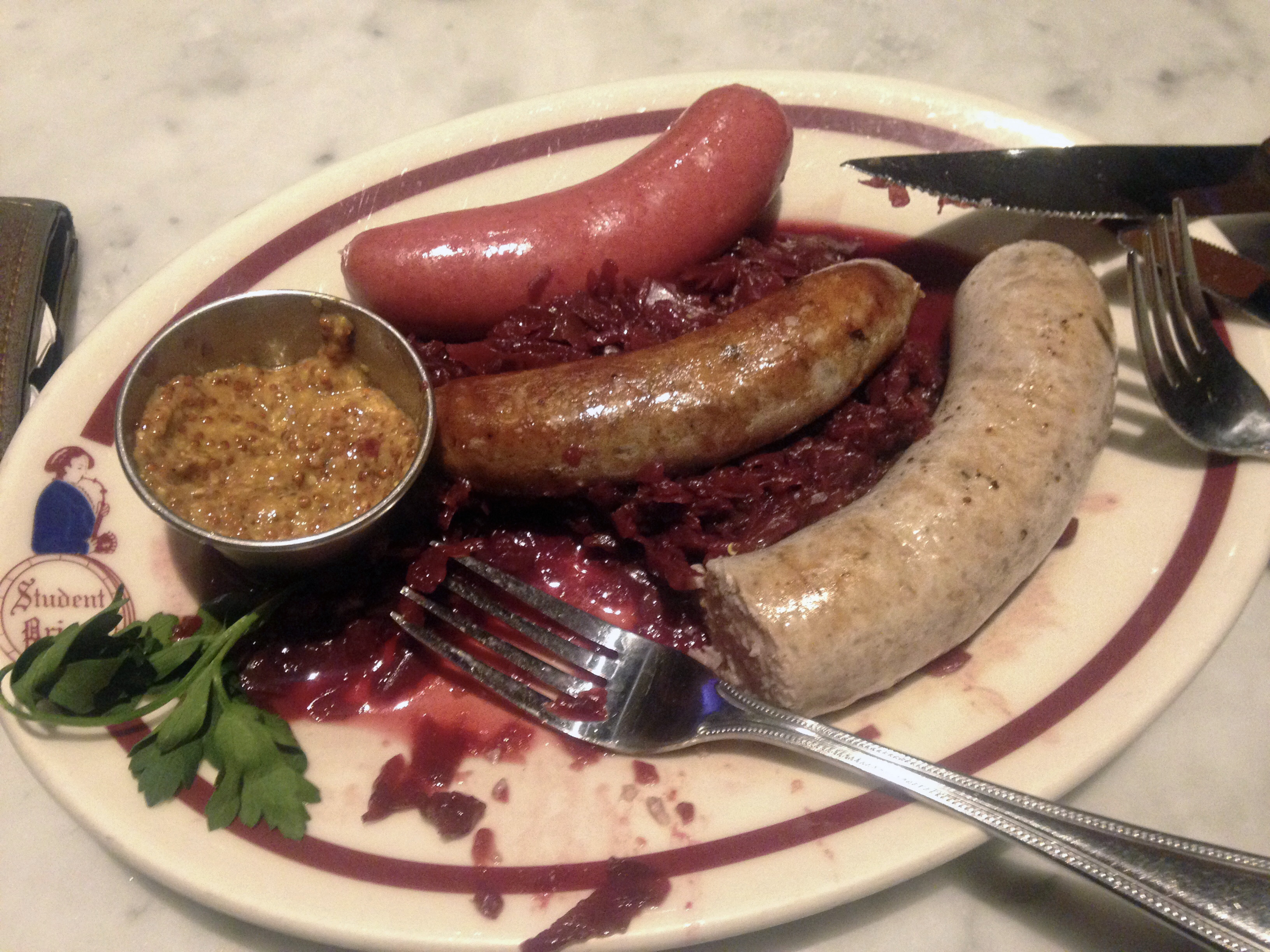
A wurstplatte from The Student Prince, with knackwurst, boar and cranberry, and bratwurst (top to bottom)

By the 1960s the restaurant's reputation had spread beyond the region and it would host such celebrities as Bonanza lead Lorne Greene, John F. Kennedy, Liberace, Carol Lawrence, Sir Cedric Hardwicke, Robert Goulet, and in later decades André the Giant. According to former owner Rudi Scherff, a typical pre-match meal for André when at the venue included "two steins of beer, two bottles of fruit wine, and two or three full meals." For decades The Student Prince has hosted annual Bockbierfest, Maifest, Oktoberfest and Christmas caroling festivities, as well as many graduation parties, weddings, labor, and political meetings. Governor Charlie Baker, Congressman Richard Neal, Mayor Domenic Sarno, and nearly every post-WWII mayor of Springfield of both major parties has held some form of fundraiser or celebration at the venue, including past statewide meetings of the Massachusetts AFL-CIO.

Schoeder died in 1948, and following Sievers' death in 1961, she bequeathed her shares of the business to be split between managers Rupprecht Scherff and Grete Silinski. On July 26, 1968, Scherff was presented a "Restaurant of the Year" Award from the Massachusetts Restaurant Association for his work to implement a new apprentice training program from the US Department of Labor, providing underprivileged trainees with apprenticeship chef's training with pay. This was but one of many examples of Scherff's engagement in city civic life, later that year he would preside as toastmaster of a charitable fundraiser by the Western Massachusetts Cafe Owners Association, celebrating the 35th anniversary of the 21st Amendment of the US Constitution which had ended Prohibition. On November 8, 1984, Springfield Mayor Richard Neal issued a proclamation that that date was "Rupprecht Scherff Day", honoring the restaurant's owner for having resided in the United States for 50 years, after immigrating from Germany. As a representative in the US Congress, Neal would also officially read an abridged history of the restaurant submitted to the Congressional Record on October 26, 1995. Silinshi would cash out on her shares in 1971 as a cash sum and pension, but Scherff, who had begun working at the restaurant in 1949, would spend the rest of his life operating the restaurant, until it was given to his children after his death in 1996 at the age of 82.

In 2010 the restaurant celebrated its 75th anniversary as part of a joint Germanic-Hispanic Oktoberfest, with New England Farm Workers Council president Heriberto Flores and Mayor Domenic Sarno christening the ceremony, tapping a keg of Spaten.

=== Closure and re-opening ===
In the late 1990s and 2000s, the restaurant saw a gradual decline in business mirroring Springfield's own dwindling economy and downtown base. By 2014, Rudi Scherff reported the restaurant had accrued $800,000 in debt, and in June of that year the restaurant closed. Local owner of Peter Pan Bus Lines Peter Picknelly, and restaurateur Andy Yee of Bean Group Restaurants, best known for Chicopee's former Hu Ke Lau restaurant, approached the Scherff family and worked out an agreement that would allow them to keep the property but removed them from day-to-day operations. As part of this agreement the Scherff family would keep the collection of steins, openers, stained glass windows, and other art, renting them to the restaurant partners for $100 a year; including terms for their maintenance and cleaning. The menu was also modernized to an extent, keeping many popular dishes, but removing some traditional fare like hasenpfeffer and schweinshaxe from the regular menu, with the addition of salads and vegetarian options to reflect changing diner tastes. Following $750,000 of renovations, the restaurant reopened on the day before Thanksgiving, November 26, 2014.

=== The Wurst Haus ===
Expanding on their express kiosk at The Big E, Bean Restaurant Group used the brand to try a new concept, The Wurst Haus, with the first opening in Northampton in January 2020. That fall, a second location was opened in West Hartford, Connecticut. The concept proved to be short-lived and, citing weak business from their openings due to COVID-19, both locations closed, West Hartford in April 2023, and Northampton by May 2025.

== Accolades ==
Over the decades the restaurant has been featured as a destination in Springfield in several publications including The New York Times, and The Boston Globe. Globe food critic Anthony Spinazzola would make a point of reviewing the restaurant twice in the 1970s, saying "one of the things uniquely unfair about reviewing restaurants is that one seldom gets back to a place he really enjoys", making an exception for The Student Prince, he would describe it in a 1975 review as "a restaurant I consider among the best in the state." Peter B. Wolf, who was chef during Spinazzola's reviews, serving from 1964 to 1980, would praise the restaurant in 2008 as a place he still frequented as a patron, despite having not worked for the venue in any capacity in nearly 30 years.

In 2008, Gourmet would list The Student Prince among "20 Legendary American Restaurants" called "Time's Tables", in the magazine's last annual "Restaurant Issue". Food critic Ruth Reichl and the editorial staff spent the previous year reviewing longstanding restaurants that had "stood the test of time and still serve great food." In addition to The Student Prince, included among the list were a number of restaurants from around the United States such as New Orleans' Galatoire's, Joe's Stone Crab in Miami Beach, Boston's Locke-Ober, New York's 21 Club, and the Grand Central Oyster Bar & Restaurant.

The following year the restaurant placed 21 among Lonely Planet and Singha's reader's choice list for the "world's great bars", the only bar appearing in the top 25 for that year from the United States. In 2014, the bar was named among 15 featured in an Editor's Choice list on travel and food website Thrillist. In 2021, it was also featured in Harvard Magazine. In 2022 it was featured on NESN's Wicked Bites.

== In popular culture ==
A fictionalized version of the restaurant is portrayed in the 2007 American novel An Arsonist's Guide to Writers' Homes in New England by Brock Clarke. Some key difference of artistic license include it being described as owned and operated by a Goerman family rather than the Scherffs, and being in an alley off of Court Square, when in reality Fort Street is about 5 blocks from that location.

== See also ==
- Germans in Holyoke
- Jacob Wirth Restaurant, historical German restaurant in Boston
