= South Holyoke, Holyoke, Massachusetts =

South Holyoke
- Neighborhood of Holyoke
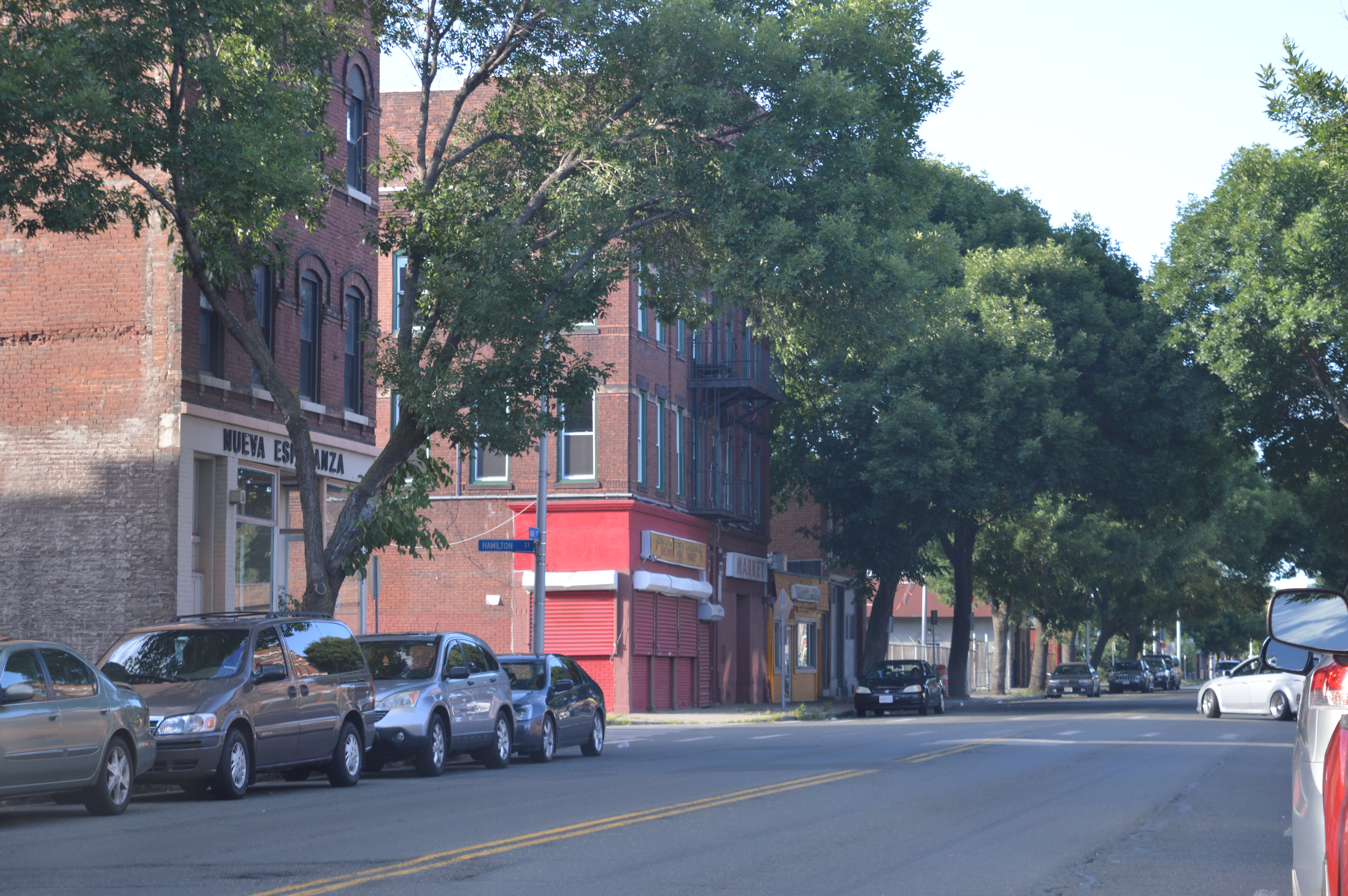
- Commercial blocks on Main Street

- Location within Holyoke Location within Massachusetts Location within the United States
- Coordinates: 42°11′48.2892″N 72°36′27.972″W
- Country: United States
- State: Massachusetts
- City: Holyoke
- Wards: 1, 2
- Precincts: 1A, 2A, 2B

Area
  - Total: 0.26 sq mi (0.67 km^{2})
- Elevation: 72 ft (22 m)
- ZIP code: 01040
- Area code: 413
- MACRIS ID: HLY.W

South Holyoke is a neighborhood in Holyoke, Massachusetts, located approximately 0.5 miles (0.80 km) south of the city center. Today the neighborhood contains many historical brick tenements and 165 acres (67 ha) of mixed residential, commercial, and industrial zoning including many of the remaining businesses of the city's paper industry. The neighborhood is also home to the city's Puerto Rican-Afro Caribbean Cultural Center, the Carlos Vega and Valley Arena Parks, as well as the Holyoke Turner Hall, one of the last remaining turnvereines in New England, and the William G. Morgan Elementary School. In 2018, South Holyoke had the highest percentage of renter-occupied housing of any Massachusetts neighborhood outside of Boston, with an average of 1.5% owner-occupied households across the neighborhood's two census block groups.

== History ==
In the mid-19th century the area was predominantly open land with some factories and brickyards, and was originally known as Tigertown, as it hosted a number of baseball teams with one Boston Globe writer later attributing the name to the fact that "local baseball men played for blood and showed such tigerish propensities toward rival teams if the game did not go to their liking". In the earliest days, the players and attendees of these games as well as the settlers of the area were largely Irish, as one of the three early working class Irish settlements in Holyoke, rarely referred to as "The Bush", with others being "The Patch" in the downtown and "The Flats" to the north.

By the 1890s these baseball fields had largely disappeared and the area became characterized by factories and worker housing, seeing influxes of different immigrant groups from Germany; with industrialist millwrights emigrating from Rhineland and about half of workers from Saxony, by 1875 it had the highest population, per capita, of German immigrants of any neighborhood or ward in New England, representing 88% of residents. In subsequent decades this demographic would Americanize and dissipate, with other immigrant communities settling there from Canada, Greece, and Puerto Rico into the 20th century. There was a large "post-Hurricane Maria migration of Puerto Ricans" to Holyoke after Hurricane Maria struck the island of Puerto Rico on September 20, 2017. As of 2018, the neighborhood's residents were predominantly Puerto Rican, with the highest concentration of any such population in Holyoke or New England, representing 73.3% of residents. On December 10, 2019, as part of a $72 statewide initiative, Governor Charlie Baker's administration announced a $6.56 million grant to support street, alley, and traffic infrastructure improvement in the neighborhood around Carlos Vega Park. The grant was part of a larger set of projects, including a mixed owner-renter housing development around the park to be funded and built by the Holyoke Housing Authority, and capital infrastructure improvement by the Water Works.
