= History of the Germans in Holyoke, Massachusetts =

Ethnic group in Holyoke, Massachusetts, United States

German people in Holyoke
Die deutsche Einwanderkolonie von Holyoke
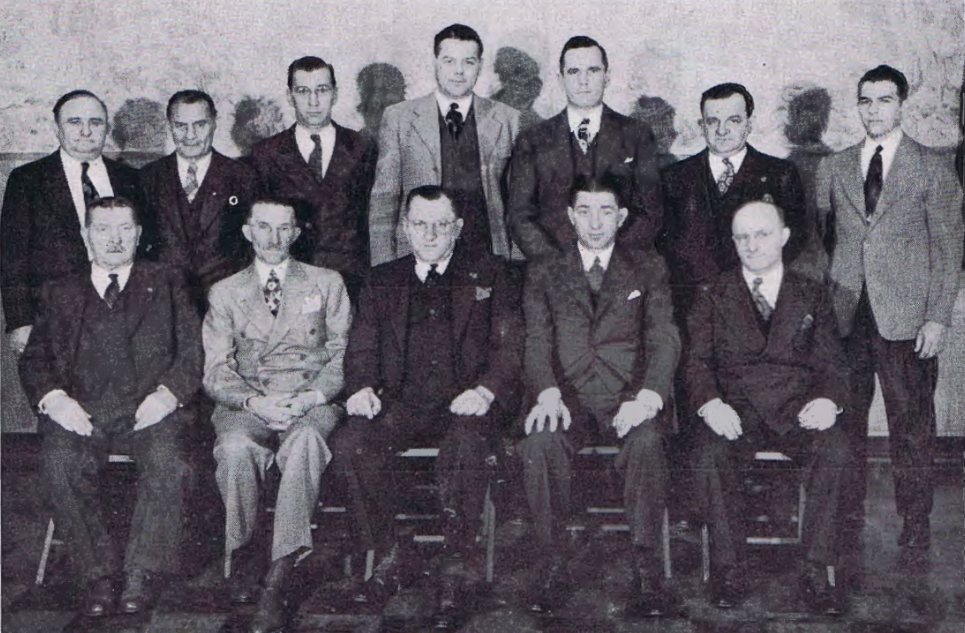
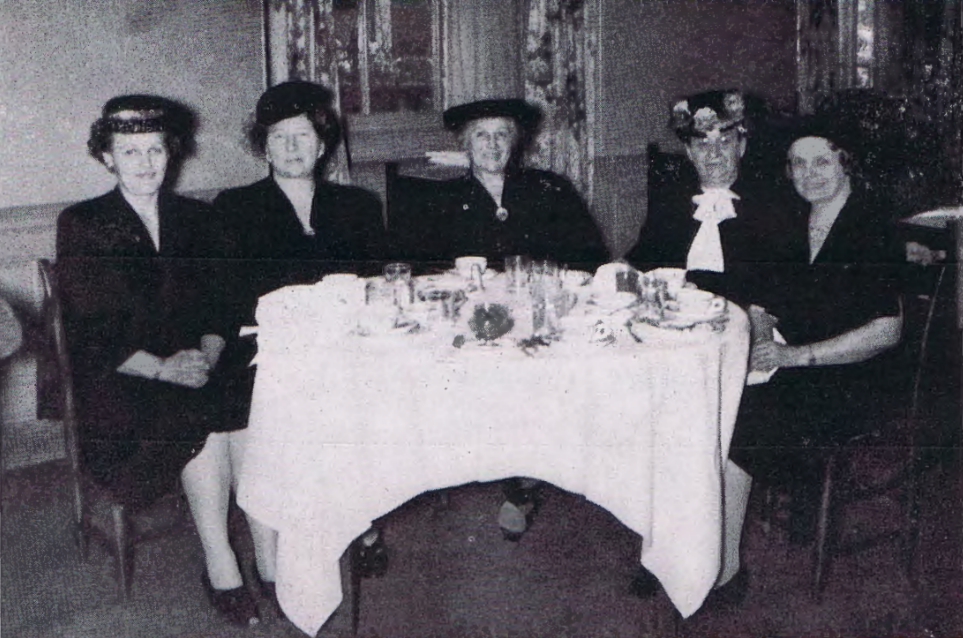
- Members of the Holyoke Turn Verein in the Board of Directors and Ladies Auxiliary, 1946

Total population
- ≈2,660 (1895) (Note: 6.6% of an estimated 40,322); 1,887 (2017)

Languages
- American English, Upper Saxon German (in 19th century)

Despite representing a significantly smaller population than their Irish, French, Polish, or Puerto Rican counterparts, in the late 19th century through the mid-20th century, German immigrants predominantly from Saxony and Rhineland played a significant economic, cultural, and political role in the history of Holyoke, Massachusetts. The influx of these immigrants can largely be attributed to a single mill and millworker complex, the Germania Woolen Mills, which formed the basis of the immigrant colony (German: die deutsche Einwanderkolonie von Holyoke, lit. "the German immigrant colony from Holyoke") that would make the ward encompassing the South Holyoke neighborhood that with the highest German population per capita, in all of New England by 1875. Along with unionization efforts by the Irish community, Germans would also play a key role in the city and region's socialist labor movements as workers organized for higher pay and improved living conditions in the textile and paper mill economies.

Reflecting anti-German sentiment in the United States nationwide, as well as the concurrent decline of the Holyoke economy, much of the community dispersed or became Americanized following the World Wars in the 20th century; as of 2010, residents of German ancestry represented 4.7% or 1,887 of Holyoke's residents, and 6.0% or 27,526 residents in Hampden County. With the exception of a handful of restaurants and institutions in the Greater Springfield area, the influence of German culture in the city remains largely relegated to historical accounts today. Following this decline in the 1940s through 1970s, much of the Germania area of South Holyoke was razed or entirely redeveloped, with some exceptions such as the Turner Hall. Other institutions like the Sons of Hermann and Heinritz's Drug Store have been preserved and repurposed as a church and cultural center respectively, for the generation of Puerto Rican immigrants who began settling there in the mid-20th century.

== History ==
=== Early immigration, establishment of the Germania Mills ===
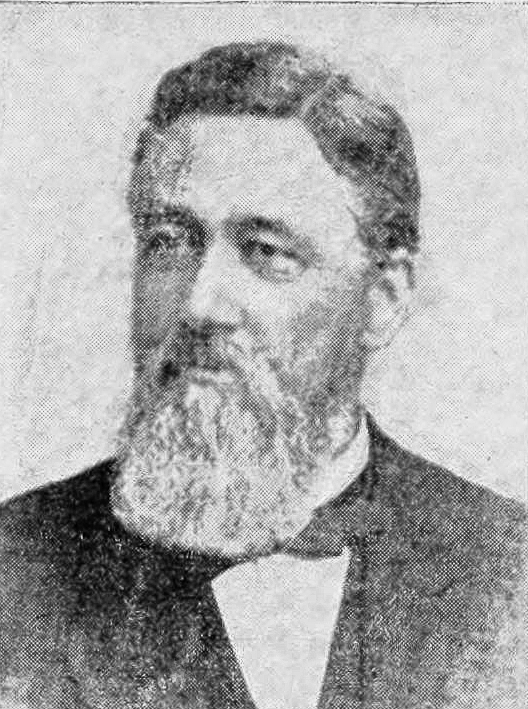
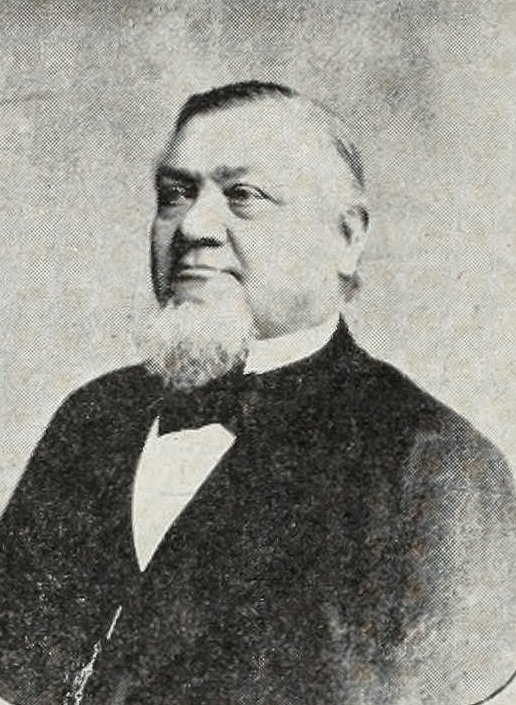
Left to right: Brothers August and Hermann Stursberg, the two textile industrialists who established Germania Mills and brought an influx of German workers
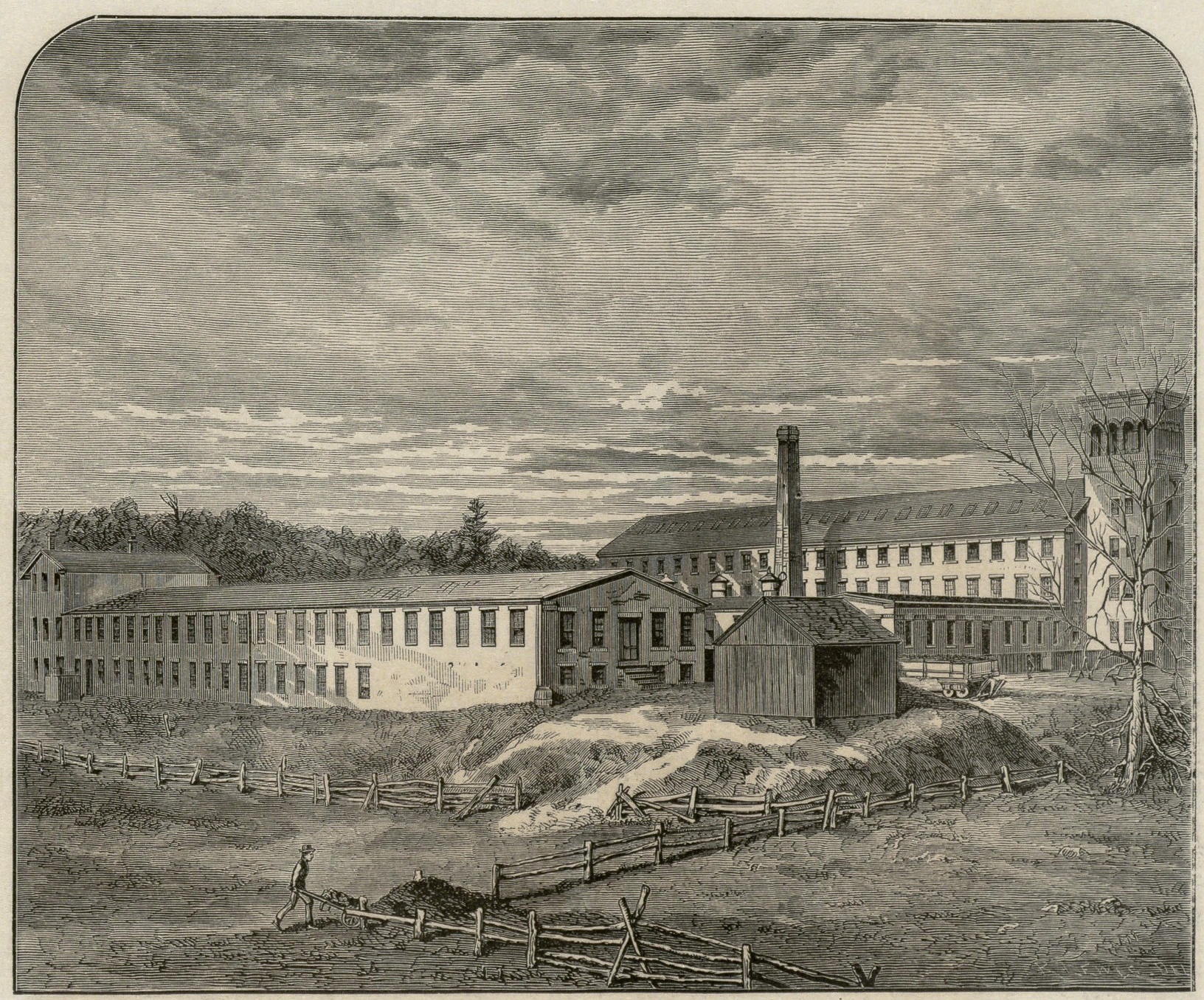
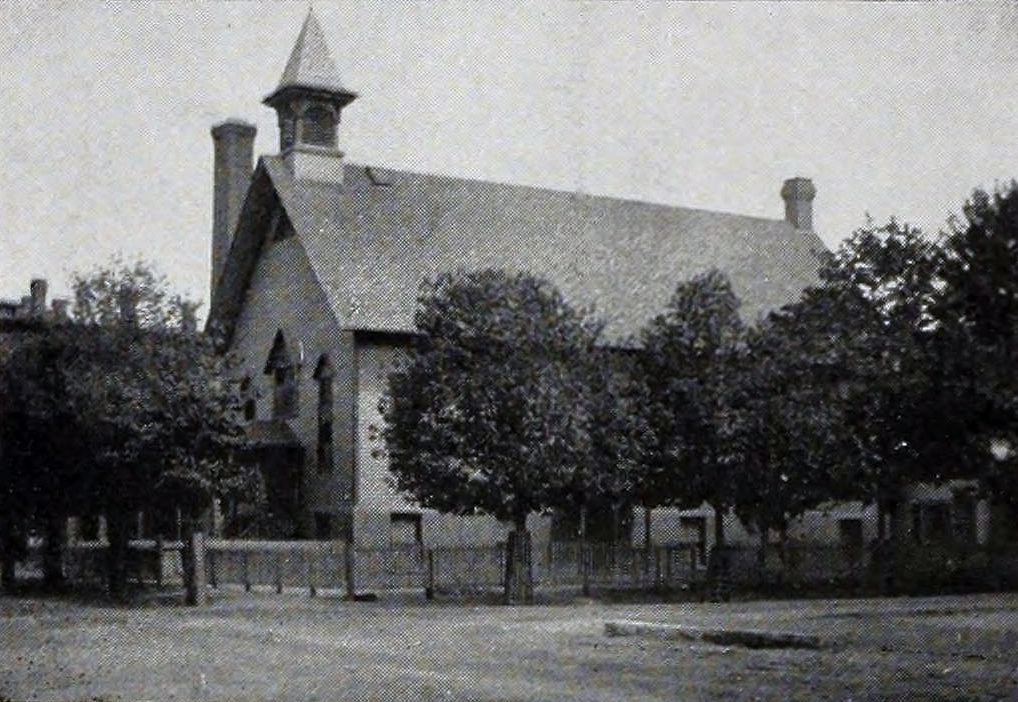
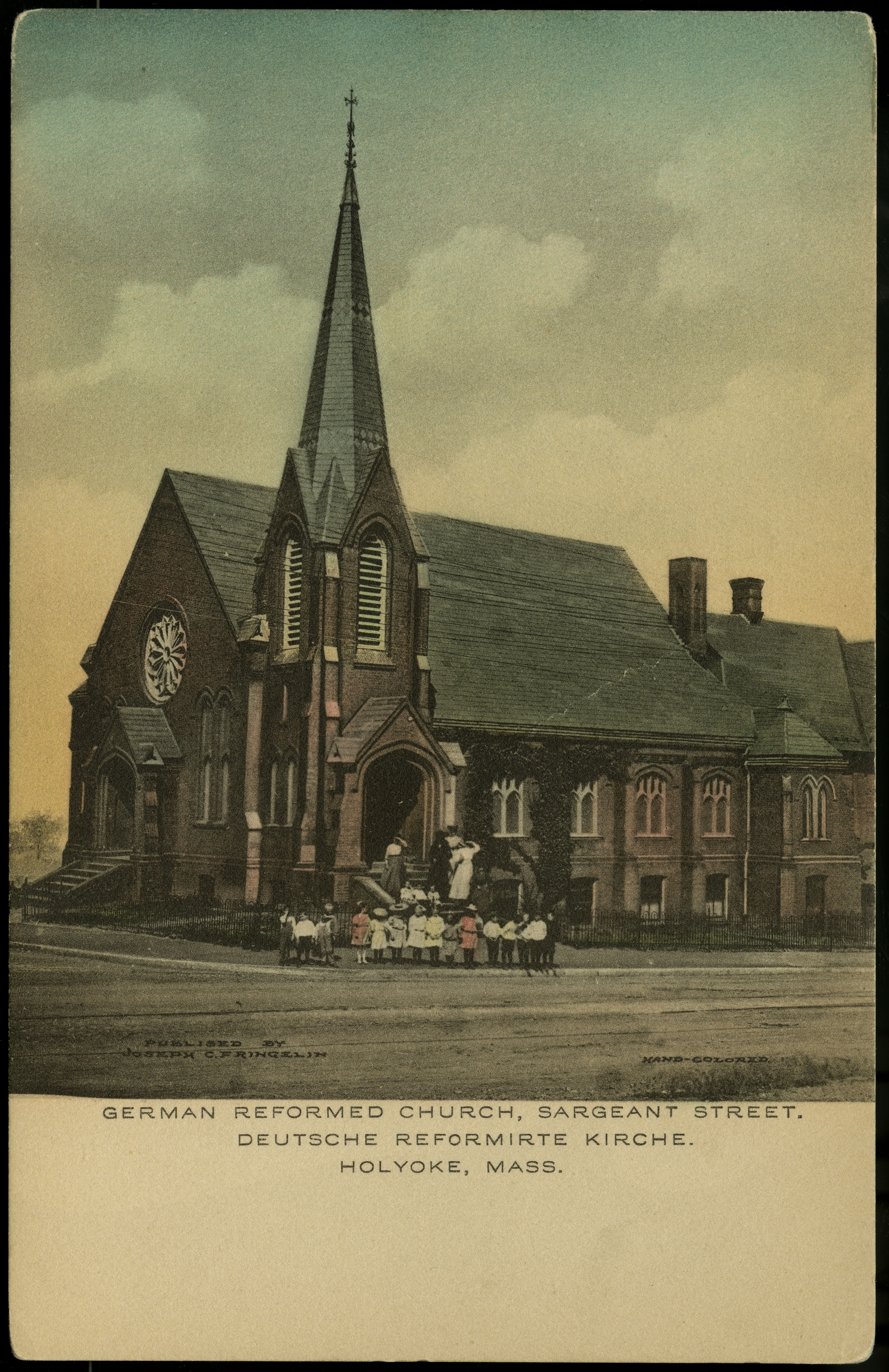
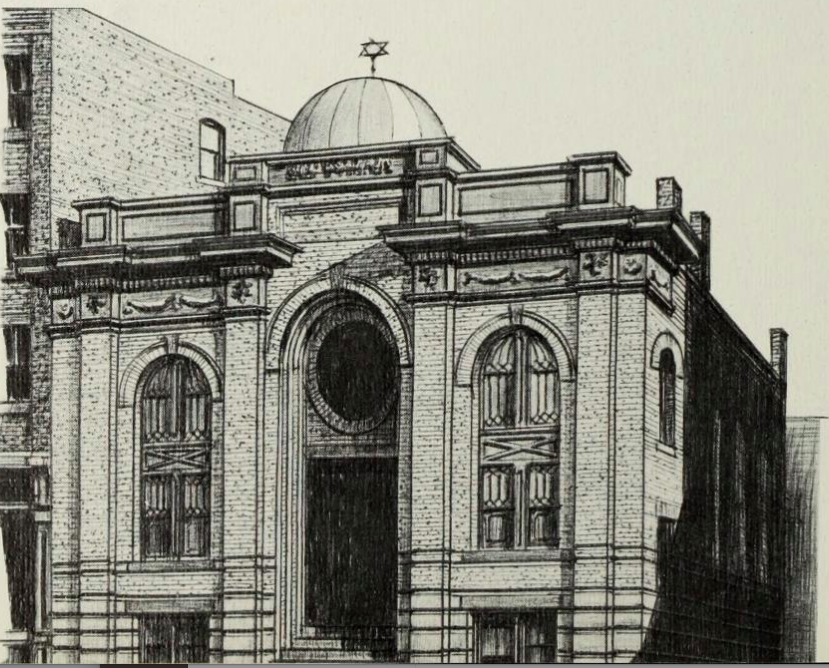
Clockwise from top-left: Germania Mills in 1876, after an 1870 expansion; the First Lutheran Church, built 1867 on Jackson Street between Clemente and S. Bridge, razed by fire during a blizzard on February 14, 1899; the first Rodphey Shalom synagogue, built in South Holyoke 1904, though largely Polish and Lithuanian, Holyoke's earliest Jewish were German; the German Reformed Church, built in 1894 and today the Bethlehem Baptist Church

In its earliest days, Holyoke, though an ambitious project, was hardly an ensured economic success. Until new industrial orders came in the American Civil War, the Panic of 1857 had decimated the industrial economy of the nation on the whole, and Holyoke was not an exception. In this same time news of the planned industrial city had reached Germany, a country that had heard of the previous success of the Boston Associates' work in Lowell, and one which had seen a substantial loss due to the economic downturn of the American economy. One particular town in Rhineland, Lennep, a center of woolen textiles, was to a certain degree able to endure the severe global recession by choosing to set up sales agencies directly in the United States rather than going through agents in Hamburg as many others had. This was largely due to the foresight of the Stursberg family whose patriarch, Wilhelm Stursberg, had first begun production in 1789 in neighboring Beyenburg (DE) and maintained his offices, home, and a number of village institutions in Lennep. In time one of his grandsons, a Hermann Stursberg, had been able to set up a successful sales office of woolen goods in New York City. Currency fluctuations in the United States from the Civil War however led to severe losses, and ultimately it was decided by the family it would be expedient to no longer rely on imports, but rather set up a mill overseas.

On January 19, 1865, August Stursberg would purchase a woolen mill in South Holyoke that had opened two years prior, renaming it "Germania Mill", as it was to be known for nearly the next 100 years. He would embark to America with his family and a team of skilled workers and supervisors on September 16, 1865, aboard the S.S. Allamania. August would play a substantial role in the emerging community both in the shaping of this industry but also in the accompanying cultural institutions that would support it. A devout Lutheran, he was credited with bringing in the German-language Lutheran ministers who first preached in a schoolhouse at the corner of Sargeant and Clemente (Park) Streets in 1866, and was a significant benefactor in the building of the first permanent home of the German Lutheran Church, now known as the First Lutheran Church, established in 1867. One historical account by the Holyoke Transcript notes that the church in its earliest years was a product of several other denominations, having been aided by local Congregationalists and served by two Presbyterian ministers, Pastor Schwartz and Pastor Frankel, the former of which also taught German classes in Holyoke. For the first several years the official denomination of the church was met with fervent debate, and it remained the only major German institution outside of Germania Mills, while still being strongly influenced by the Stursbergs.

Although the Jewish community would later be characterized by immigrants predominantly from Vilna, Lithuania, the city's first Hebrew families would also arrive from Germany around the same time as the Lutheran community, with five such families living in Holyoke by 1890; among the early settlers were the names Adler, Cole, King, and Marks. For the better part of the first half of the twentieth century, the Jewish center of the city remained in South Holyoke alongside the German community, as the long-since demolished first synagogue of Congregation Rodphey Sholem was built there on Park/Clemente Street in 1904.

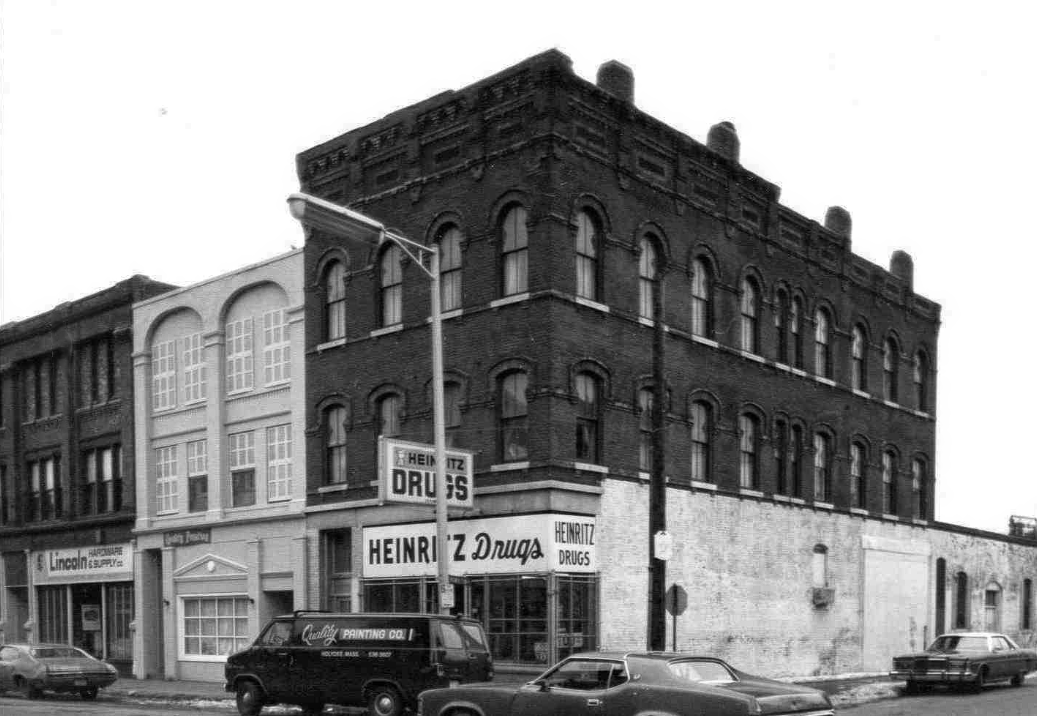
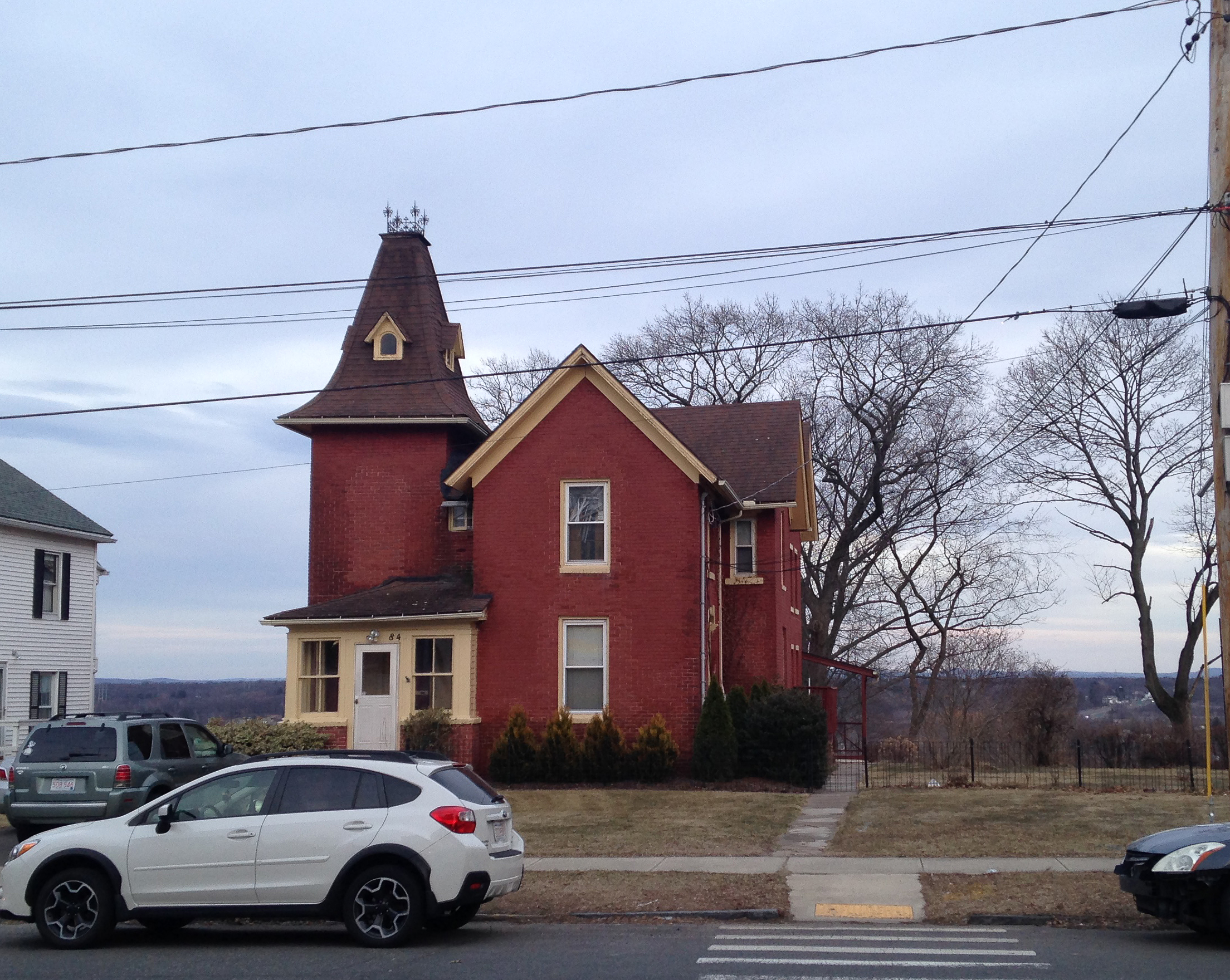
Arriving as a child in 1851, John Heinritz, an immigrant from Sparneck, Bavaria, went on to open his South Holyoke pharmacy in 1879, which would additionally function as a postal substation, box office for the Holyoke Opera; the Heinritz House in Elmwood, with its tower

Seeking to create a Turnen Verein (Gymnastics Society) as a community space outside of church, about twenty members of the German community met at the butchery of one Robert Schubert on the evening of May 28, 1871, laying the groundwork for such an organization. Historian Gerhard Wiesinger notes in his account on Holyoke's Germans that this may have been prompted by anticipation of community growth, as the meeting occurred only two weeks after the Treaty of Frankfurt. At the first official meeting of the organization on June 8, at Schubert's house and garden, officers were elected and the motions were made to formally incorporate the Holyoke Turn Verein as an organization "in order to provide the German language, German customs and traditions, and particularly German gymnastics with a permanent home". Over the next several years the group would meet at various member's homes, as well as at the Germania Hotel which stood at the corner of Race and Hamilton Streets. (Note: Not to be confused with the venue in Springfield of the same name.)

In 1874 the Turn Verein purchased land from the Holyoke Water Power Company and built the beginnings of the Turn Hall still on South Bridge Street today. Part of the impetus for this were blue laws against Sunday activities, including exercise, in public. The turnhall would expand its hall in 1893, also purchasing several tracts of land adjacent to the original building for a biergarten and for outdoor gymnastic exercises.

=== Second wave of immigration ===
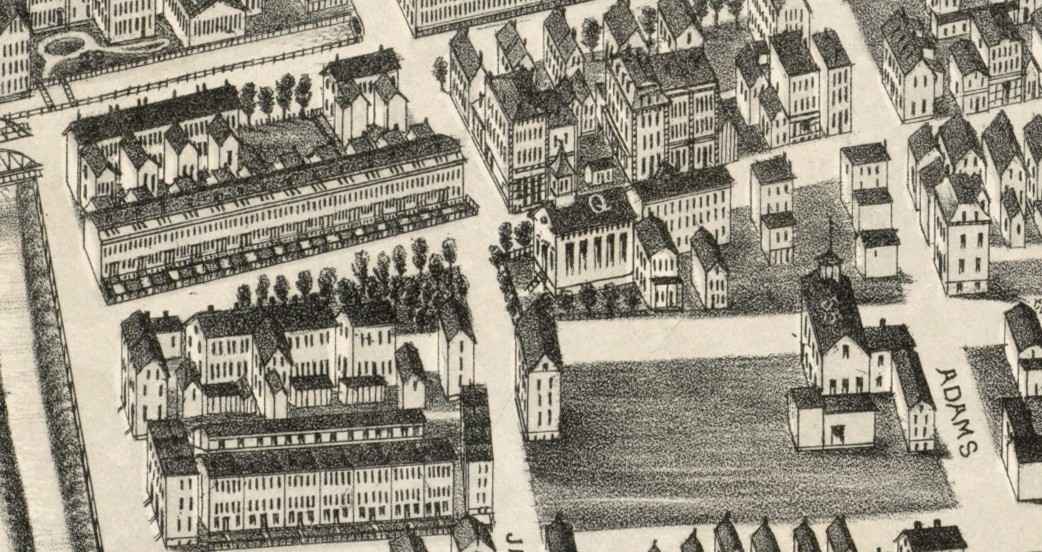
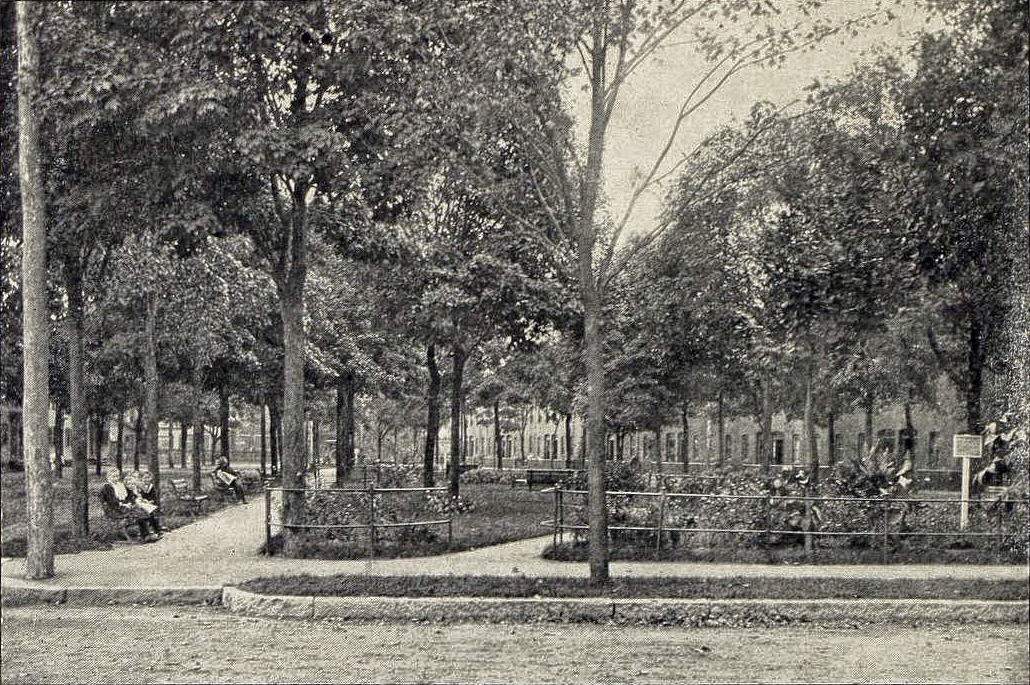
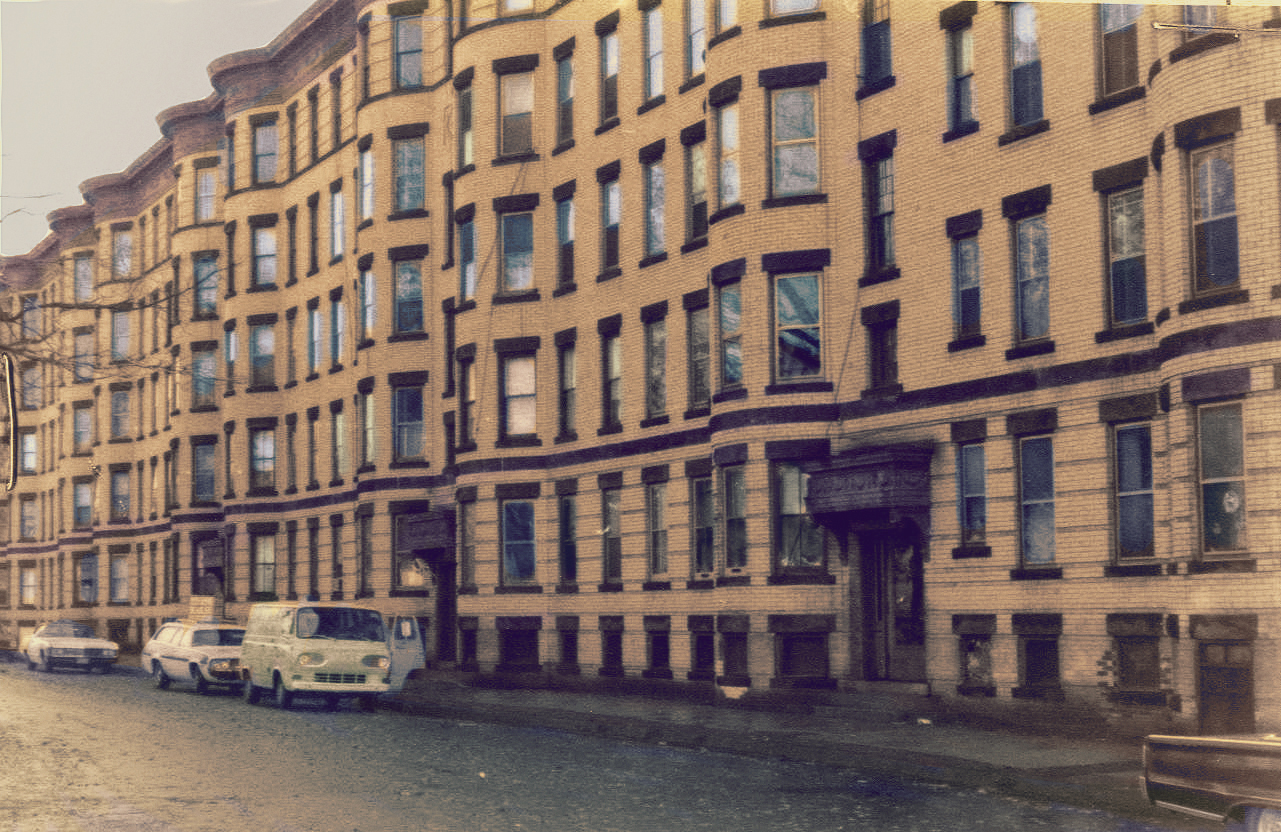
The Germania Mills workers colony, built chiefly around Germania Park (left) and worker housing complex (Note: Largely known today as the "Battleship Block" for the sheer scale of the buildings at their peak.) (right)

More German workers would arrive in the subsequent decade, predominantly from Saxony, with such immigration reaching a peak in 1881. With this new wave of immigrant workers, came new attitudes both about culture and politics, introducing a socialist-union element to Holyoke politics. In time an Irish-German political alliance had formed under one Henry Winkler, however this machine would fail after supporting 1891 Mayor Michael J. Griffin, who had in time gained a reputation for corruption. Even still in the 1880s, more than a place of refreshment, the turnhall had become venue for the political class, with candidates for mayor attending gymnastics events there and at least one French-Canadian "Candidate [for City Clerk] Genest acted like a native of the Fatherland" there.

A number of greater festivals would be held there as well, including a turnfest hosted by the Springdale Turner Vorwaerts featuring 1,200 gymnasts from more than 30 clubs on the east coast in 1899. Such turnfests typically included many events known to modern track and field, such as shot-put, high jump, and broad jump. In 1916 the Holyoke Turnhall would similarly take part in the Hartford Bezirksturnfest, coming in first overall, before concluding the event singing a series of songs including several American patriotic tunes and Deutschlandlied, at that time not yet the German national anthem. Similarly in 1938 the Holyoke Turnerverein hosted the New England Turnfest, which brought 10 other Turner teams and more than 2000 people to Camp Jahn in Southampton, Massachusetts.

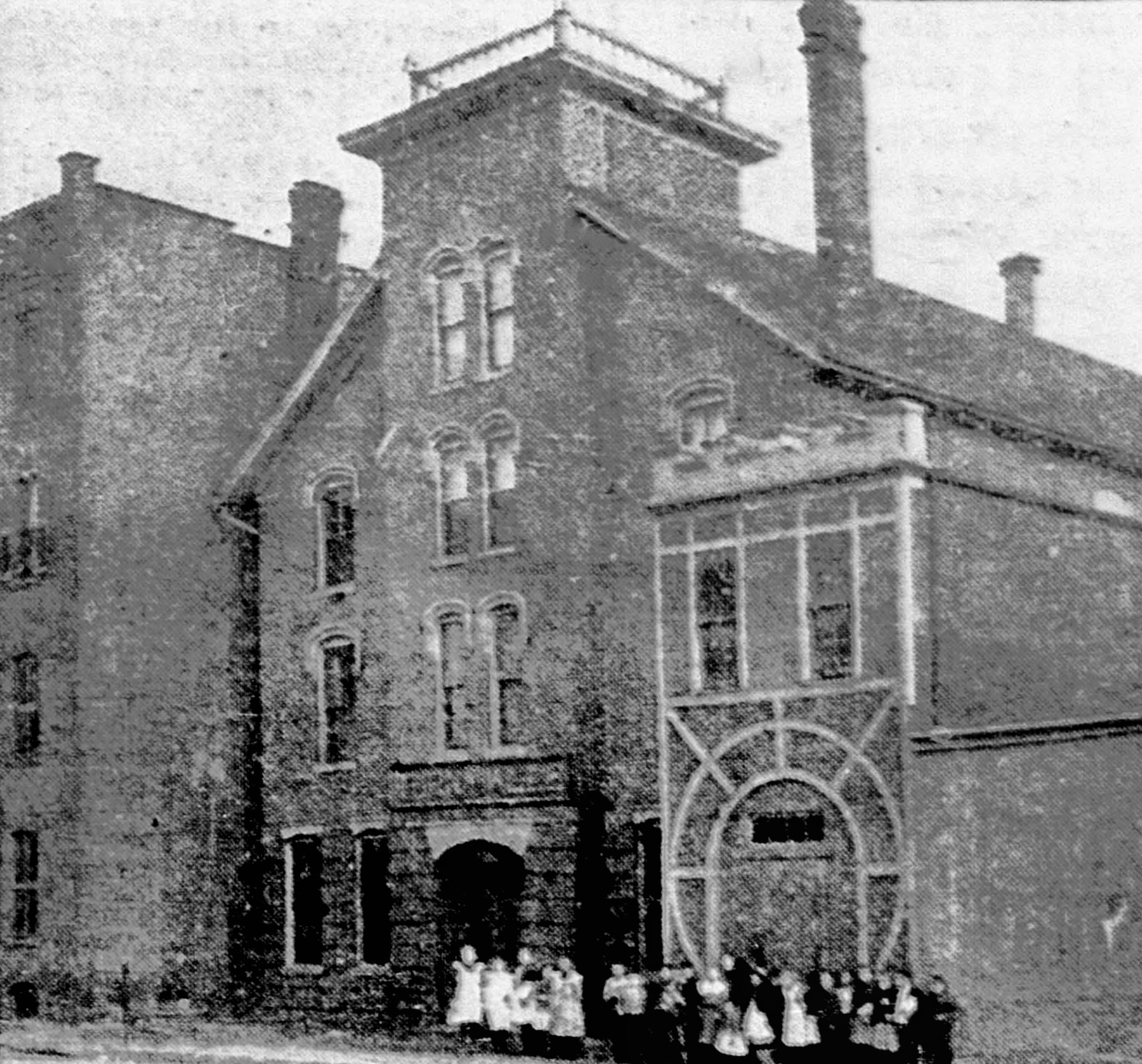
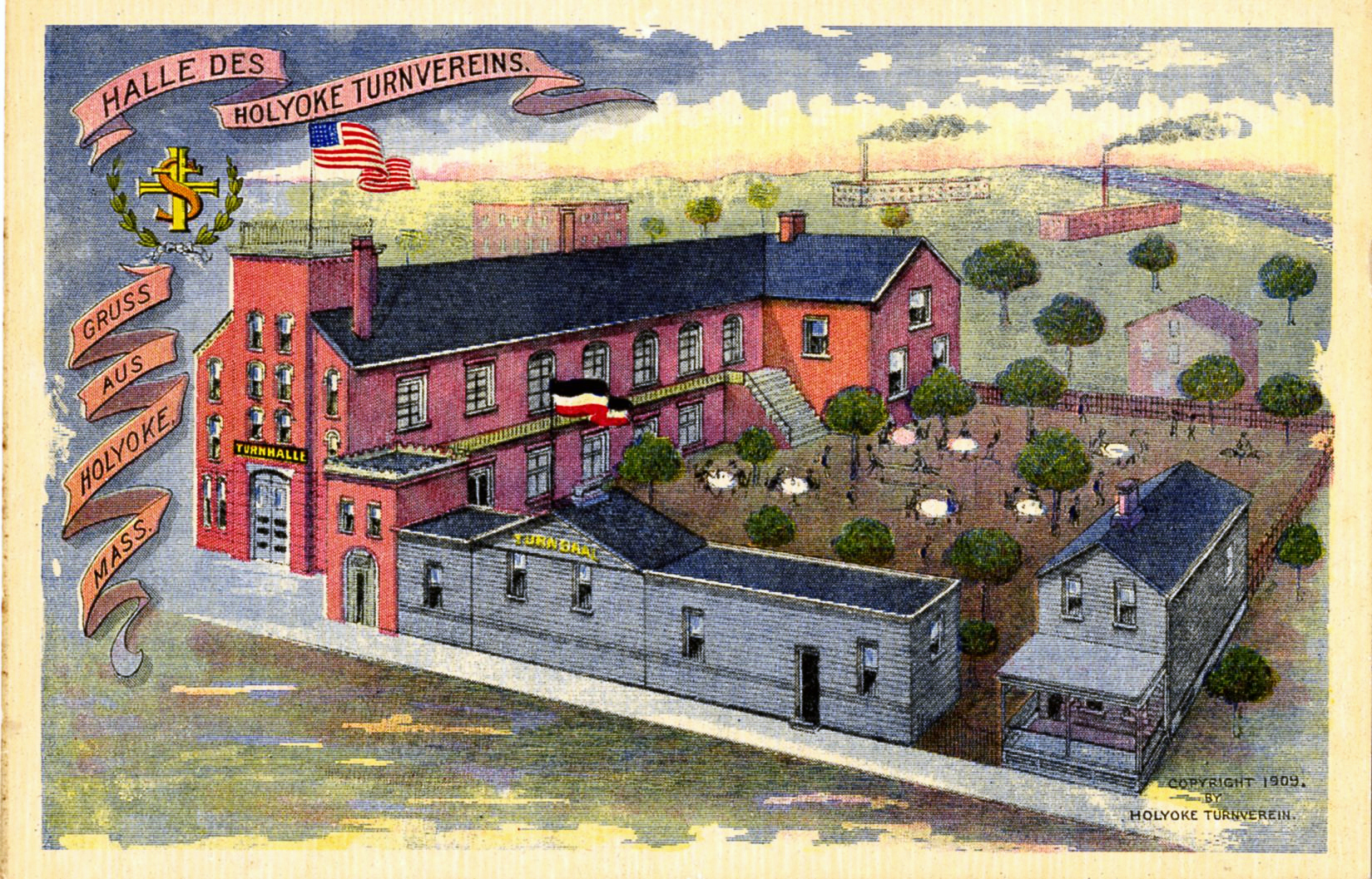
Left to right: Photo of the Holyoke Turn Halle entrance in 1902; Holyoke Turn Halle building and grounds as they appeared on a 1909 postcard

Another example of German cultural events in Holyoke came with the "Schiller Festival" at the Holyoke Opera House to celebrate noted German poet Friedrich Schiller's work. On May 14, 1905 a number of members of the Western Massachusetts and Connecticut German communities descended on the venue to listen to dramatic readings of the poet's work as well as accompanying music furnished by the Springfield orchestral club. (Note: Not to be confused with the Springfield Symphony Orchestra) Proceeds of the event, organized by Jacques Wisly, then-publisher of the New England Rundschau and his editor Otto J. Miller, benefited the Holyoke City Hospital at the time.

The German community would also bring with it a number of musical acts; indeed a plurality of orchestras in the Springfield-Holyoke area were established and led by German immigrants in the late 19th century and early 20th century including, but not limited to, examples such as Weizel's, Wildner's, and Wagner's orchestras.

=== Decline and contemporary history ===
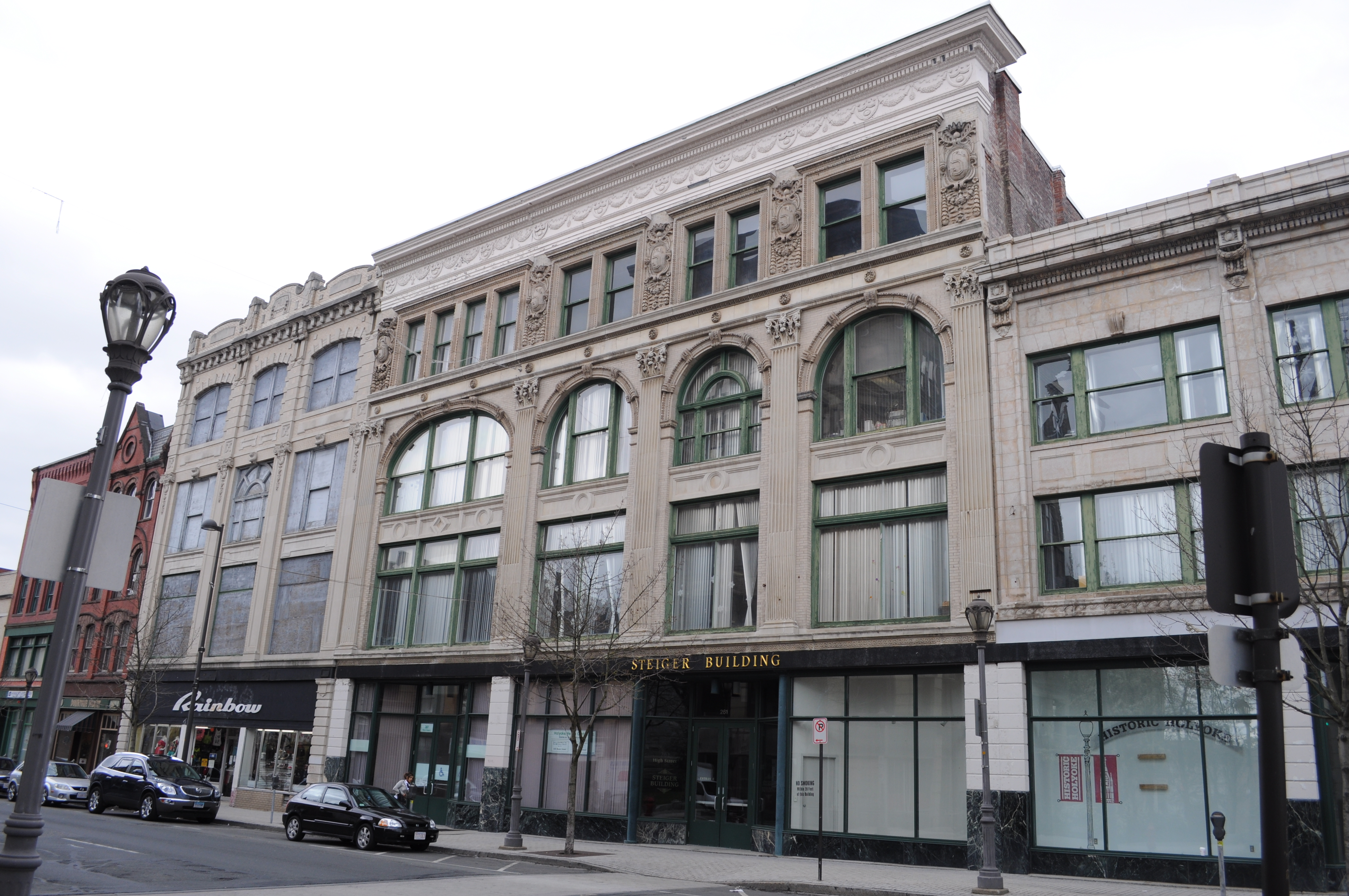
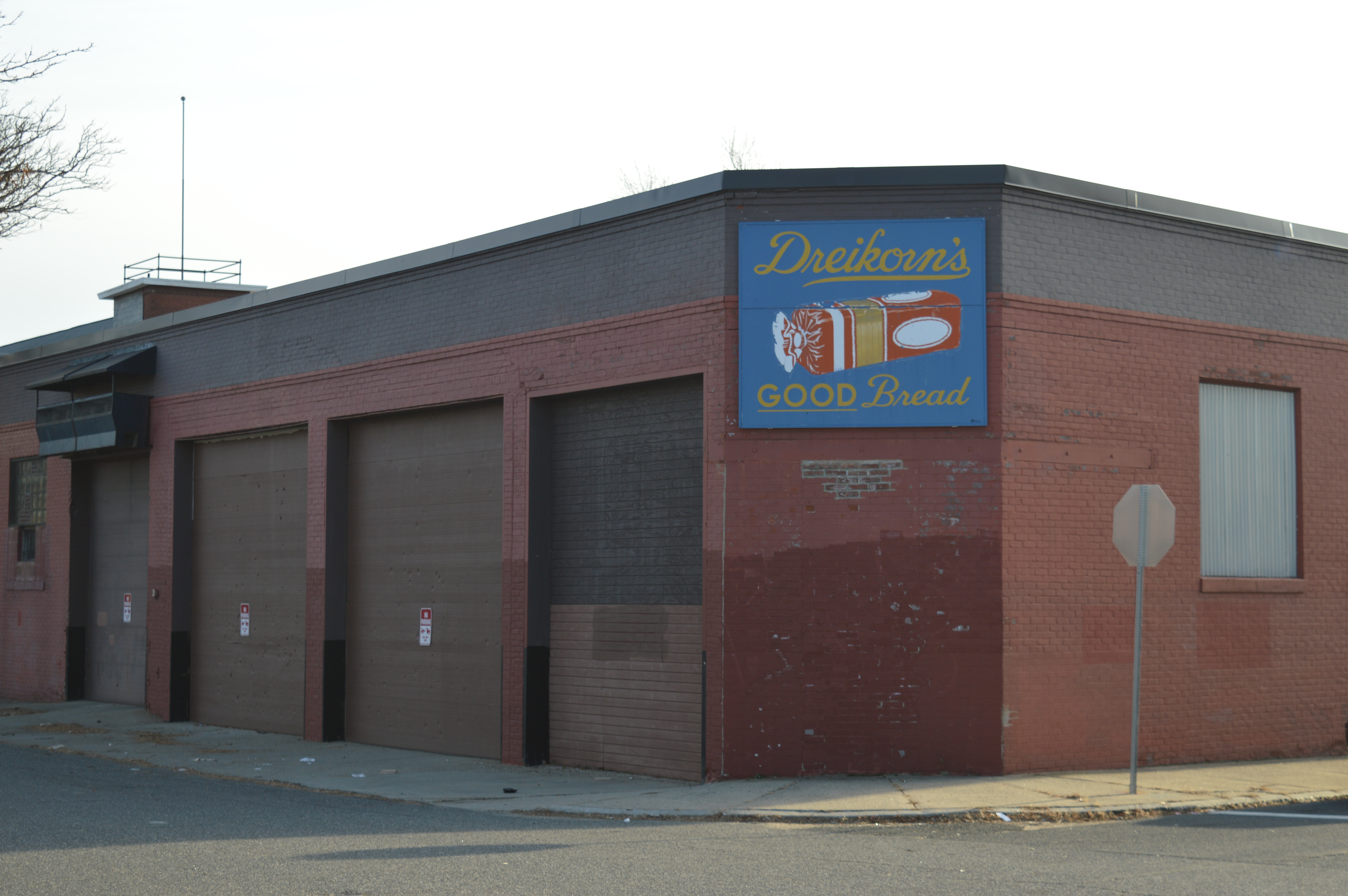
The ornate facade of the Steiger Building, formerly the site of Holyoke's first department store, as it appears today; founded by Otto Dreikorn in 1889, Dreikorn's Bread would both serve and grow beyond the community, becoming a regional baking company by the time of its closure in 1987
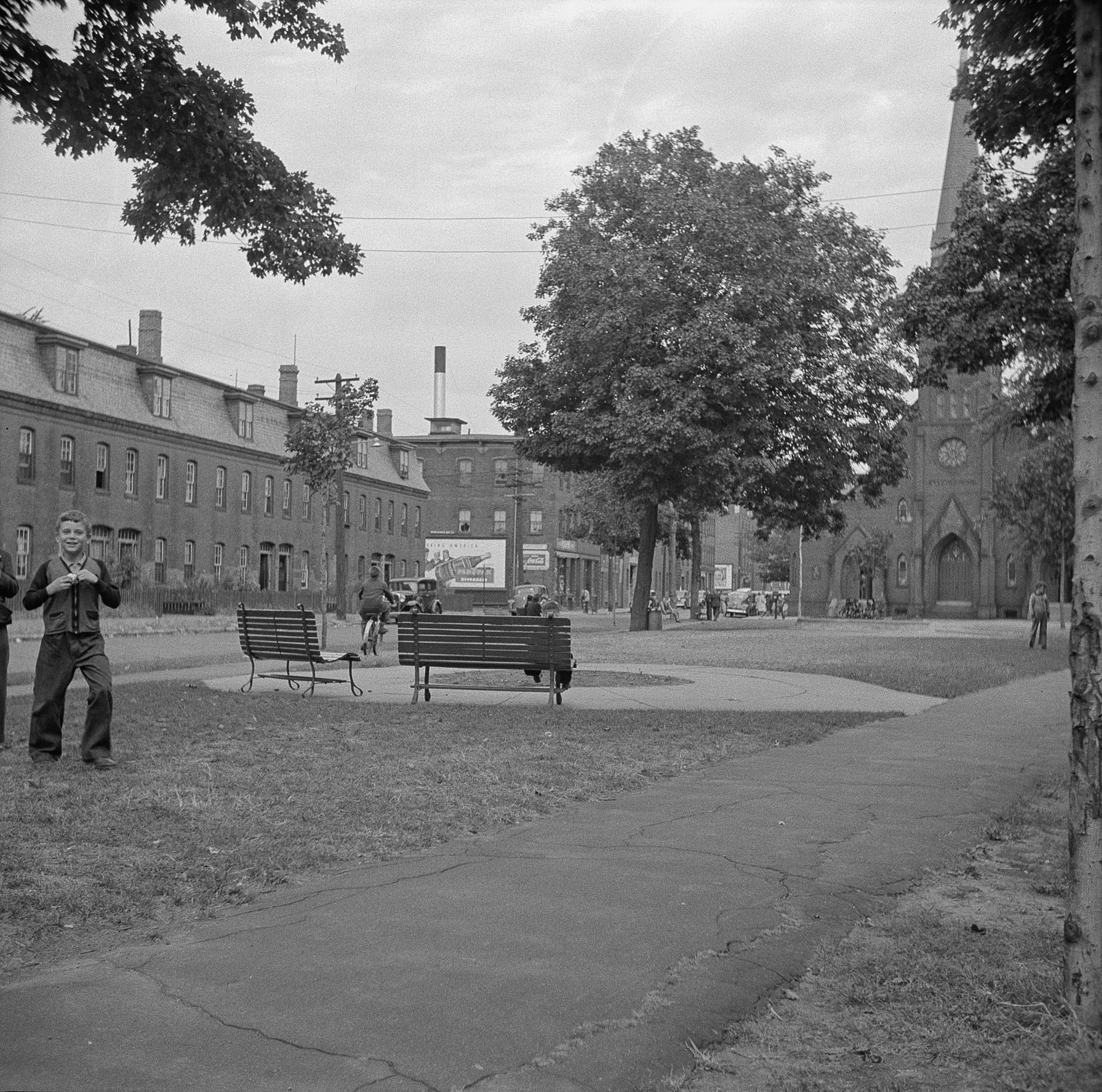
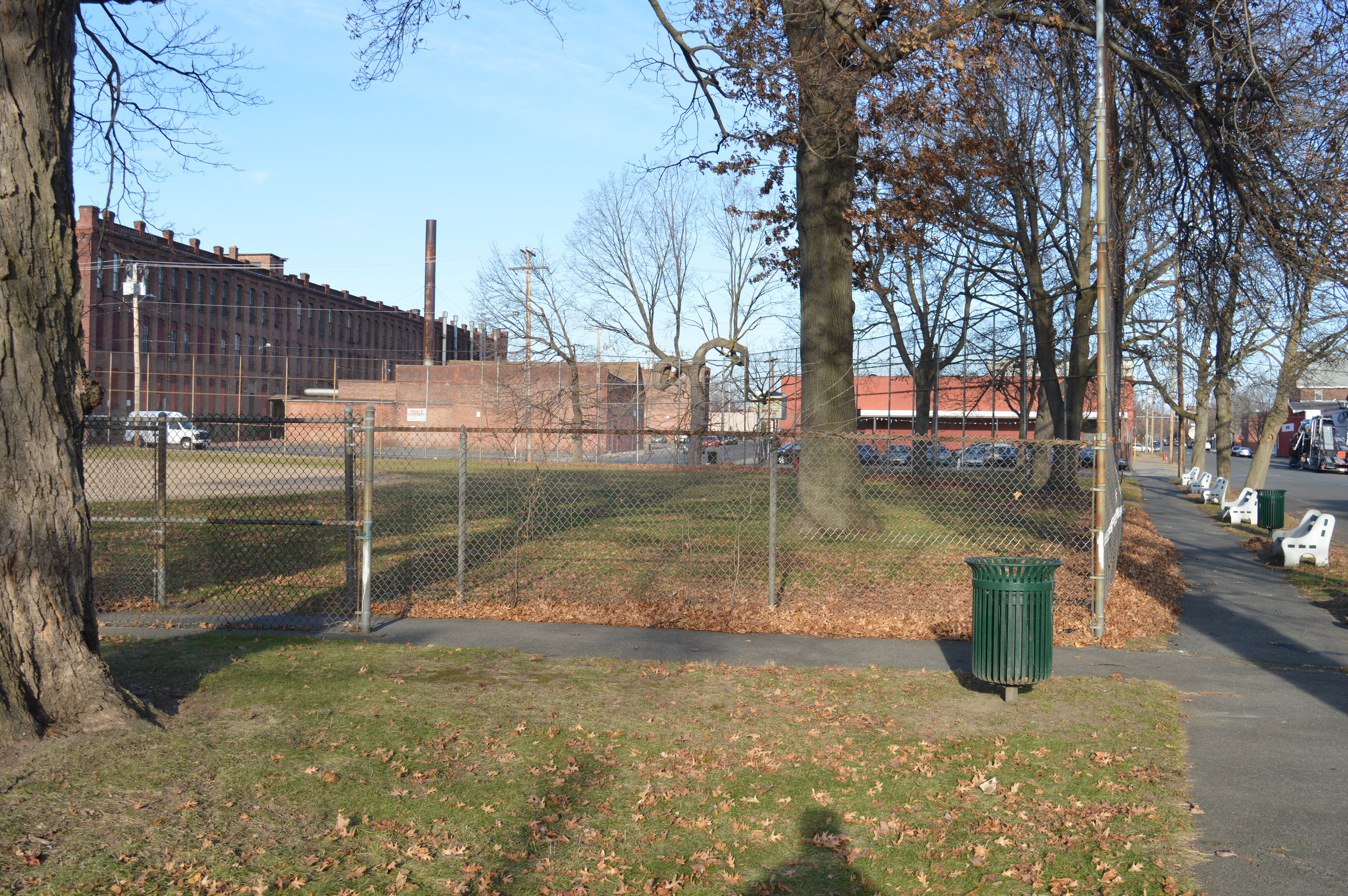
Photos of the Germania Park area in October 1941 (top), and December 2018 (bottom), the one commonality between the two being the small metal chimney visible in the center-left; the portion of Clemente Street (née Park Street) abutting Germania Park, now Bonin Field, was filled in and all buildings were razed during the 20th century sometime after 1950 and before 1980

Germania Mills would become another economic casualty of the Great Depression when in 1934 the mills closed. That same year the company would drop the name Germania and adopt that of its former Livingston Worsted Division, which it moved from Washington, Rhode Island to Holyoke. Previously the division handled the weaving and finishing of the fiber spun at the Holyoke mill, following its closure the company moved entirely to the former. Livingston Worsted mills would continue manufacturing fabric for a number of clothing firms including Hickey Freeman, but on August 28, 1964, J. Herman Stursberg, descendant of the founders, would announce the company's closure just short of its 100th anniversary. Speaking with the press Stursberg would attribute the move to economics, saying the worsted mills could not compete with Japanese imports as 50% of overhead costs for the mill went into wages significantly higher than foreign counterparts.

Similarly to the redevelopment of the Polish community in the downtown area, the German blocks of South Holyoke abutting Germania Park were entirely razed beyond recognition through fires and urban renewal initiatives in the mid-20th century. Of the original Germania Mills complex, only two of the "Battleship Block" apartment buildings remain, with no other worker housing buildings or residences of any kind extant in the immediate vicinity. Germania Park and the so-named worker housing on the opposite side of Clemente Street were considered as being combined into a larger park as early as 1944, however the plan to remove the road and raze these structures was still under discussion for an urban renewal project by 1956. By August 1956, the local landmark had been badly damaged in a case of arson which razed one of its units; the unoccupied rowhouses had been reportedly plagued by a series of smaller fires as well, attributed to children who would break into the vacant units on weekday evenings. By 1957 the blocks had been razed and with the abutting street had been converted to a parking lot. New trees were planted in the Germania Park, and by some point in 1982 the street had been incorporated into the park, then called Germania Bonin Field.

Among the wave of immigrants who had immigrated from Saxony were a handful of bakers who would go on to establish regionally successful companies or affiliates in the 20th century. One of the first among these was Richard H. Dietz. Arriving from Saxony in 1881, he established his bakery at the corner of Clemente and Jackson Streets, moving his business, Dietz Bakery, several times to larger facilities in the subsequent decades before it removed to Springfield in 1910. He would leave the business when his company merged with the Massachusetts Baking Company in 1918 which, that same year, was bought by what would become the Continental Baking Company.

External image
- Dreikorn's Bread Advertising Mockup, a designer's mockup for a Dreikorn's Bread advertiser's brochure, circa 1985

Dietz's competitors included one Otto Dreikorn, who also arrived from Saxony in the 1880s, establishing Dreikorn's Bakery in 1889. The business would gradually expand under both his leadership and his son, Otto M. Dreikorn, who assumed the family business after his father died in a car accident in 1911. Gradually over the 20th century the company would greatly expand, assuming a larger commercial model under James Dreikorn sometime after 1928, who expanded delivery to multiple supermarkets and outlets. In time the company became a household name in the region, marketing its breads in distinct orange labels as "untouched by human hands". With a changing consumer market in the latter decades of the 20th century, the company would attempt to promote new products other than its sliced enriched white bread, including honey wheat bread, however the bakery would sell its recipes and right to distribution to Stroehmann and finally cease production in late 1987, although signage has been kept up at its former Holyoke factory as recently as 2019, commemorating the role of the former business. At the time of its closure it had two other office facilities in Adams and Newington, Connecticut.

Another notable business of the community which shaped commerce in the area was Steiger's. Established as a clothing and dry goods store in 1896 by Albert Steiger, who had emigrated to the United States from Baden-Württemberg as a child in 1868, by 1899 the store had moved into what was then the first department store (Note: Reported at the time as the first building in Holyoke made specifically and exclusively for the sale of dry goods) in Holyoke at that time. By the time of its acquisition and liquidation by The May Department Stores Company in 1994, the store had grown into a regional chain with a large flagship store in Metro Center, Springfield.

== Institutions ==
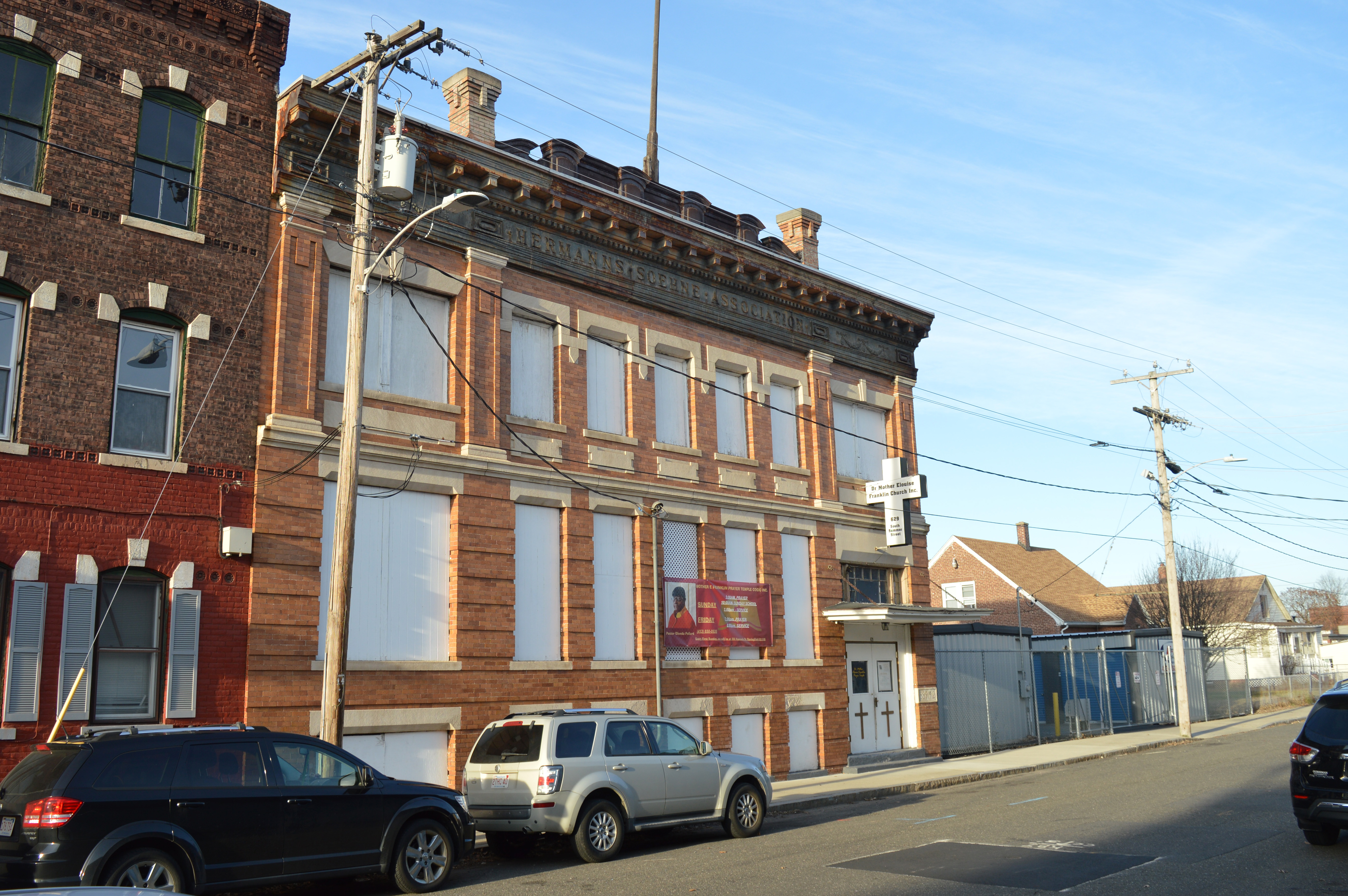
The former meeting hall of the Sons of Hermann Association (Hermanns Soehne Association), converted for use by a local church in 1973, within a decade of the club's closure; the benefit society's insignia showing Hermann (Arminius) with his sword aloft

Coat of arms of the Holyoke Schützenbund, a schützenverein founded in 1889, active through the early 20th century

While not as prominent as the Turnhall in its influence, one of the societies that played a significant role in German life in Holyoke was its local Sons of Hermann lodge, the first established in Massachusetts out of an eventual 22, Teutonia Lodge No. 1, ODHS. Founded on November 18, 1889, the benefit society promoted dance and drink among members, as well as mutual insurance. It appears in its formative years the organization held meetings at the Turnhall among other places, and may have for a time considered becoming a part of the German Order of Harugari or that group may have existed in Holyoke with a lodge of the same name separately. Eventually, with a membership of 175, opened its own meeting hall in 1912 designed by George P. B. Alderman. Equipped with a rathskeller, cafe, and auditorium hall seating 500, the hall would host many other groups over the years, predominantly unions, labor organizations, and civic groups like the Holyoke Fire Department. The club would remain a keystone of both the city community, being honored multiple times by city mayors, as well as the German community across the state, hosting members and leadership from other communities into the mid-20th century.

At some point in the organization's earlier history it also established the Thusnelda lodge, a ladies auxiliary named after Hermann's wife. By the end of the organizations existence, one of its charter members, Otto Broeker, had remained with it for its entirety before dying at the age of 98 in 1965. While the exact date of the society's folding is unknown, by 1968 a bar known as the "Sons of Hermann Club" was being operated out of the building by a single family, and by 1976 an obituary of a former member referred to it as "the former Teutonia Lodge". In one of the earliest examples of reuse of South Holyoke's buildings, the meeting house was renovated in 1973 by the New Hope Church of God in Christ, today known as the Dr. Elouise Franklin Church.

A number of smaller organizations, like the German-Austria Sick Benefit Society, and the German-American Social Club of Holyoke, would appear in the early 20th century, but few endured as long or in as many accounts of history as the Turnhall and the Sons of Hermann. One exception to this was the Springdale Vorwaerts Turn Verein, which broke off of its South Holyoke counterpart and formed in 1886 with 34 members citing substantial differences regarding politics after a textile labor strike orchestrated by them which had failed.

=== Newspapers and publishers ===
German-Language Newspapers of Holyoke
Holyoke Journal (1883–1889)^{[a]}
Der Beobachter (1883–1889)^{[a]}
Zeitgeist (c. 1886–1903)
Neu England Rundschau (1889–1942)
Connecticut Staats-Zeitung (1890–1942)
Die Biene (1894–c. 1918)

Teutonia (1907–c. 1918)

Missouri Lutherische Liga Bote (unkn)
^{[a]}Merged into Neu England Rundschau

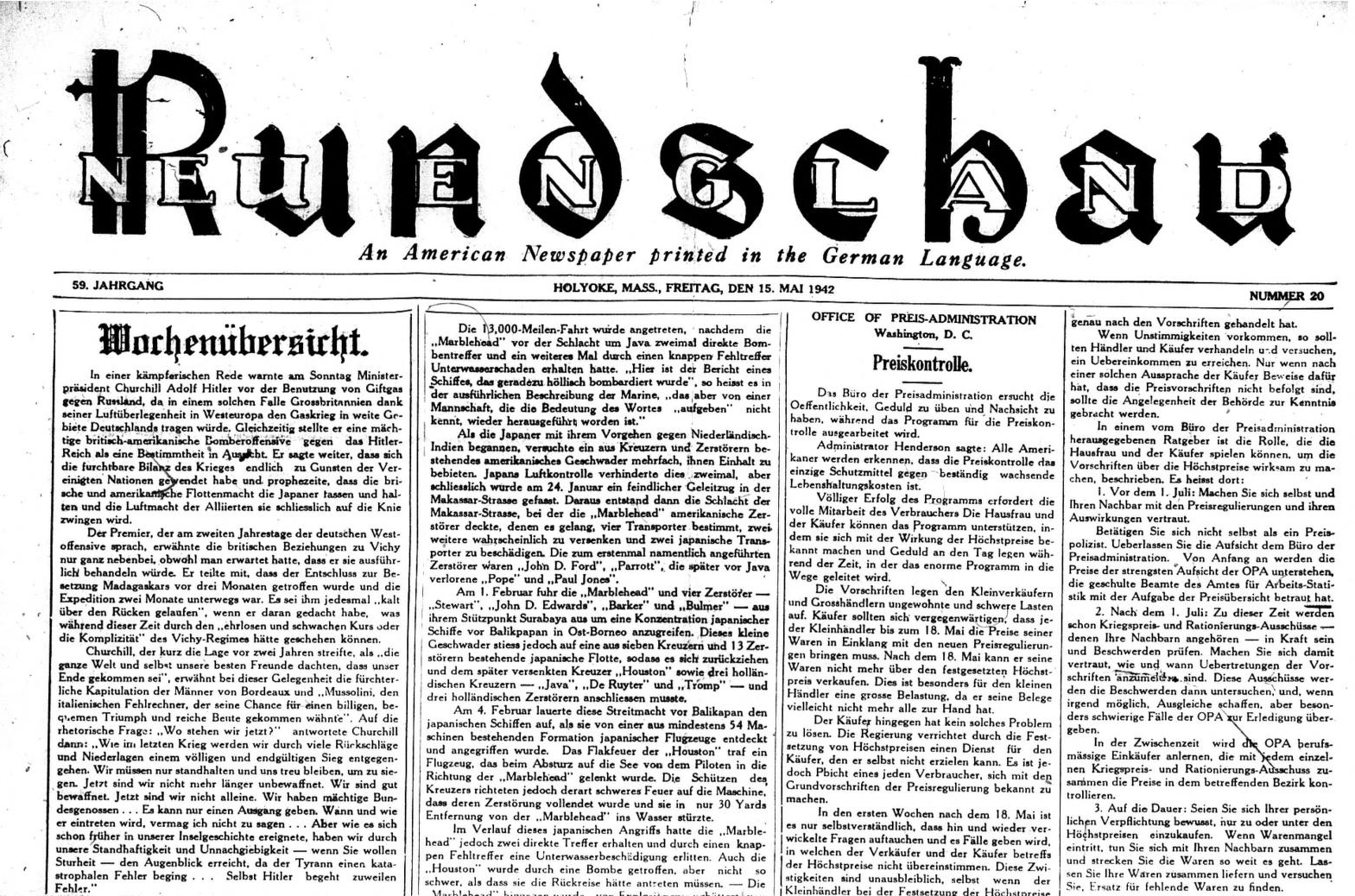
The Neu England Rundschau or "New England Review", originally called the Holyoke Journal, it was the first and longest running German-language weekly published in Holyoke from 1884 to sometime around 1942; its parent business, the Hitchcock Press, remains extant in the city as of 2019

Throughout the late 19th and early 20th century, Holyoke would serve as a publishing center for the German language, having more newspapers and similar serial publications in the German language published there from its founding through the 1950s than any other New England city besides Boston. This was attributable to a handful of printing tradesmen in South Holyoke and Springdale, whose business eventually morphed into some of the English-language presses still extant there today. Mistakenly cited as the first German newspaper of the city by some accounts, Die Biene ("The Bee"), was a weekly published by Saxony emigrant August Lehmann; beginning publication in 1894, and continuing until shortly after Lehmann's death in 1917, as late as 1918 or 1920. During his life Lehmann would serve as an advocate for the Union Labor movement, and by the time of his death the paper was listed as the only Labor newspaper published in German in New England, along with his second publication Springfield Vorwaert ("Springfield Forward"). From about 1907 to 1918 Lehmann would also publish The Teutonia, a German monthly by the Sons of Hermann with a circulation of about 2500.

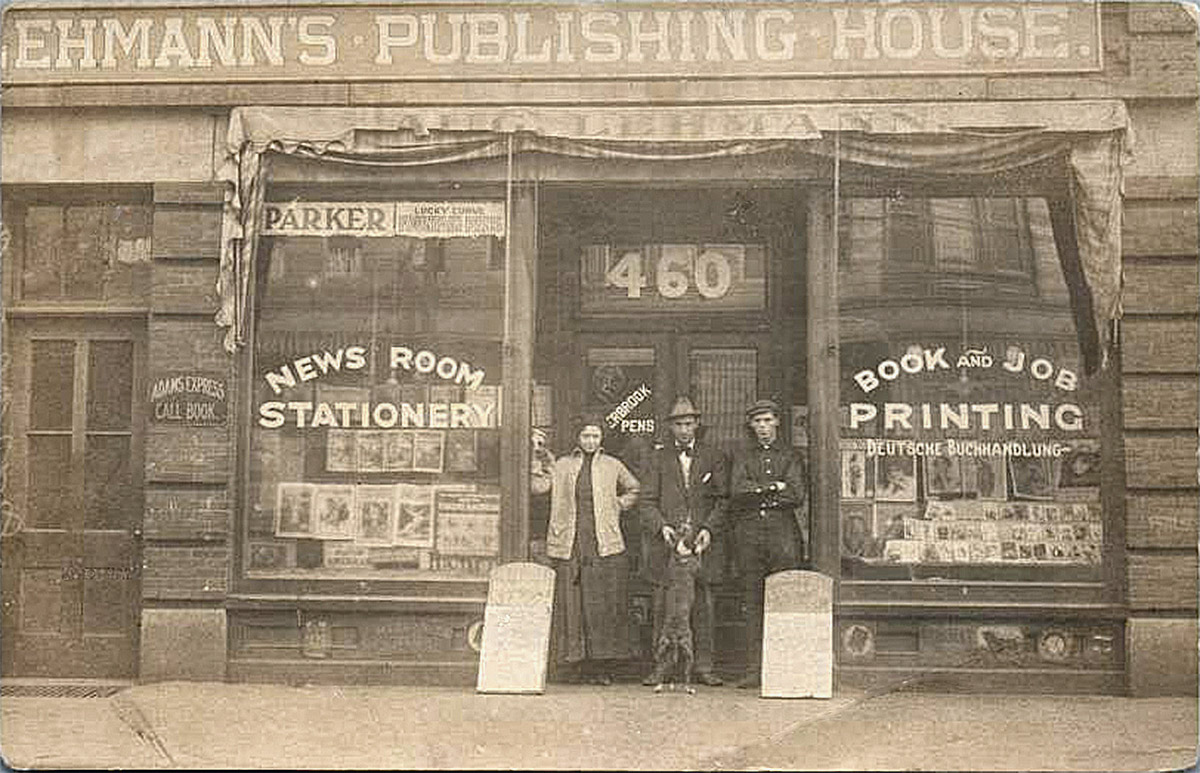
Lehmann's Publishing House, as its Main Street storefront appeared, prior to its closure, c. 1922

For a time Lehmann also served as the manager of The German American Publishing Company, another local interest founded in 1883 or 1884, which carried his papers in some capacity during their publication. The German-American Publishing Company, known as the German-American Printing Company after 1888, would publish the longest-running German newspaper in Holyoke. Begun in 1883 as the Holyoke Journal, initial a reprint of the Boston-based New-England Staaten-Zeitung, under the leadership of the William Thieme the German weekly would merge with the smaller Der Beobachter and be rechristened the Neu England Rundschau or "New England Review" in 1889, a name it would keep throughout the remainder of its history. Thieme would retire in 1893 and by 1900 the paper was owned by one Jacques Wisly, whose descendants would continue to operate it with news local and international until folding in the latter half of 1942. The end of its publication was attributed to economics, however, the influence of anti-German sentiment cannot be discounted, as in a syndicated column entitled "German Papers Here Spread Poison" 20 years prior, the paper was among those named as spreading anti-Patriotic writing, without given context, that "Germany [was] more democratic than the United States". By the end of its publication the paper had a circulation of 4,000, down from a peak of 5,200 in 1910. At the same time the German-American Printing Co. ceased publication of its other longterm work printing the Connecticut Staats-Zeitung, an independent weekly that had been published in Holyoke as well as a number of other presses in Connecticut.

Wisly would remain involved in the company well into the 20th century and would rename it The Wisly Lithograph and Printing Company by 1921, and by 1934 Jacques Wisly's son Victor Wisly and daughter Regina Brooks had taken over the press, renaming it the Wisly-Brooks Company. While the German paper ceased publication by the end of World War II, its parent company remained; in 1956 the company would be purchased by one David Kornetsky and renamed the Hitchcock Press after its original location on Hitchcock Street. In 1971 it was purchased by a J. Guy Gaulin, who chose to specialize the business as a letterpress printer despite changing technological trends in the industry; the company remains extant in this business today under the management of his daughter Deanna Gaulin.

== International relations ==
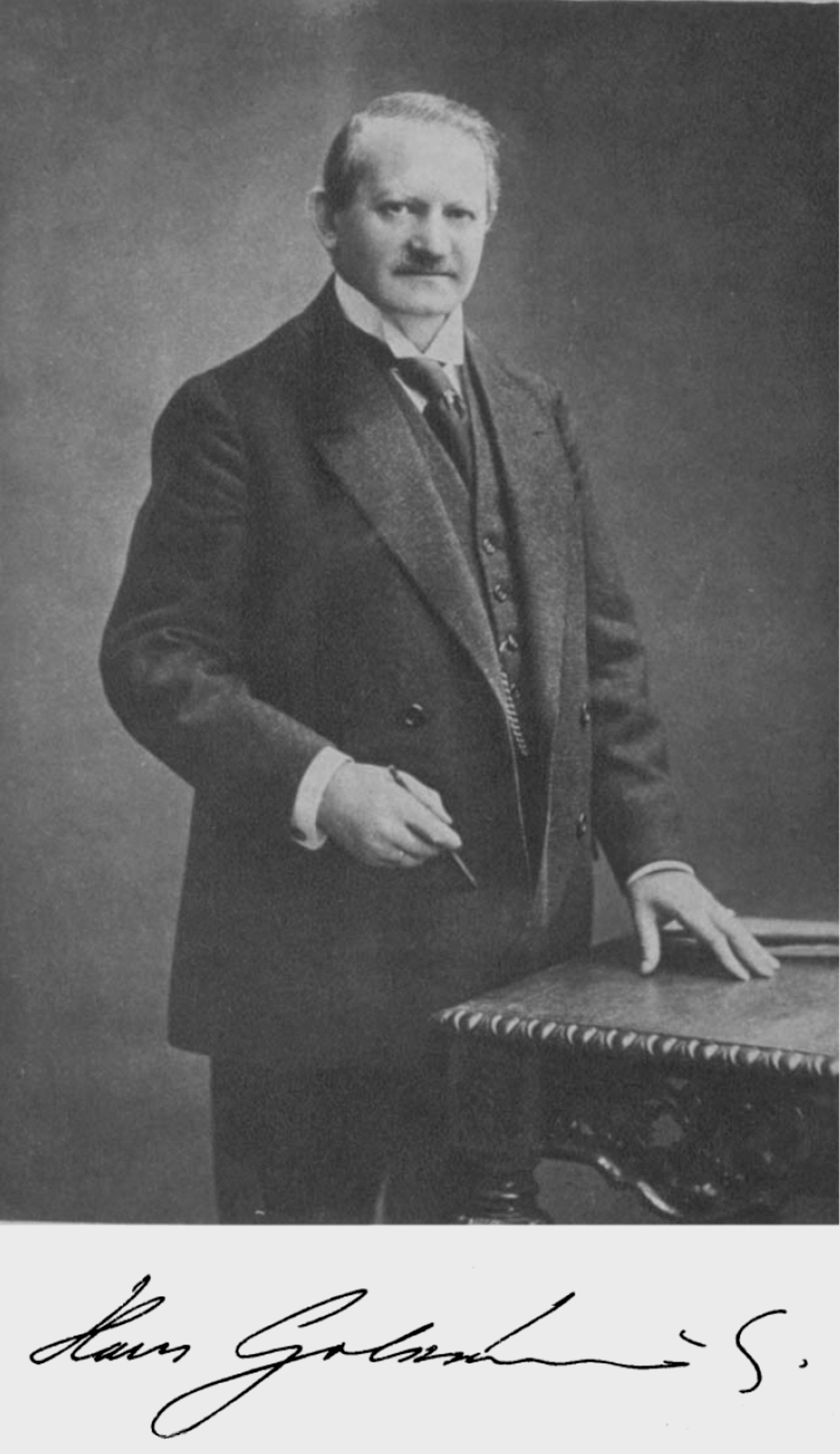
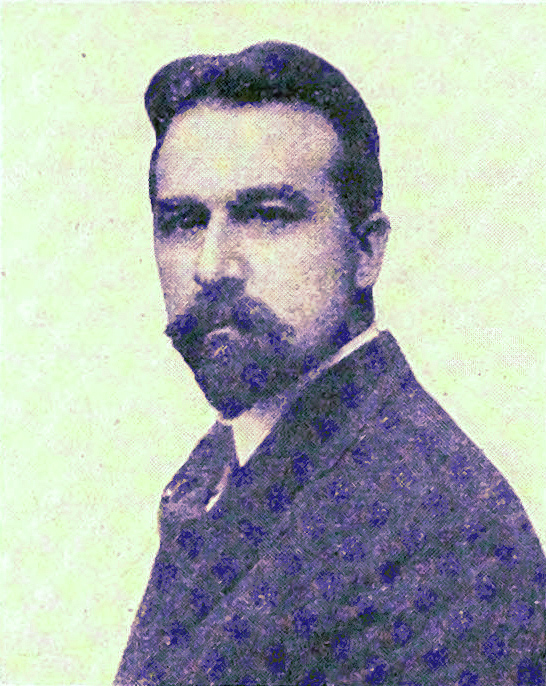
Left to right: Hans Goldschmidt, who hired George E. Pellissier to engineer much of the early developments of the Goldschmidt Thermite Company upon the opening of its first American offices in New York City

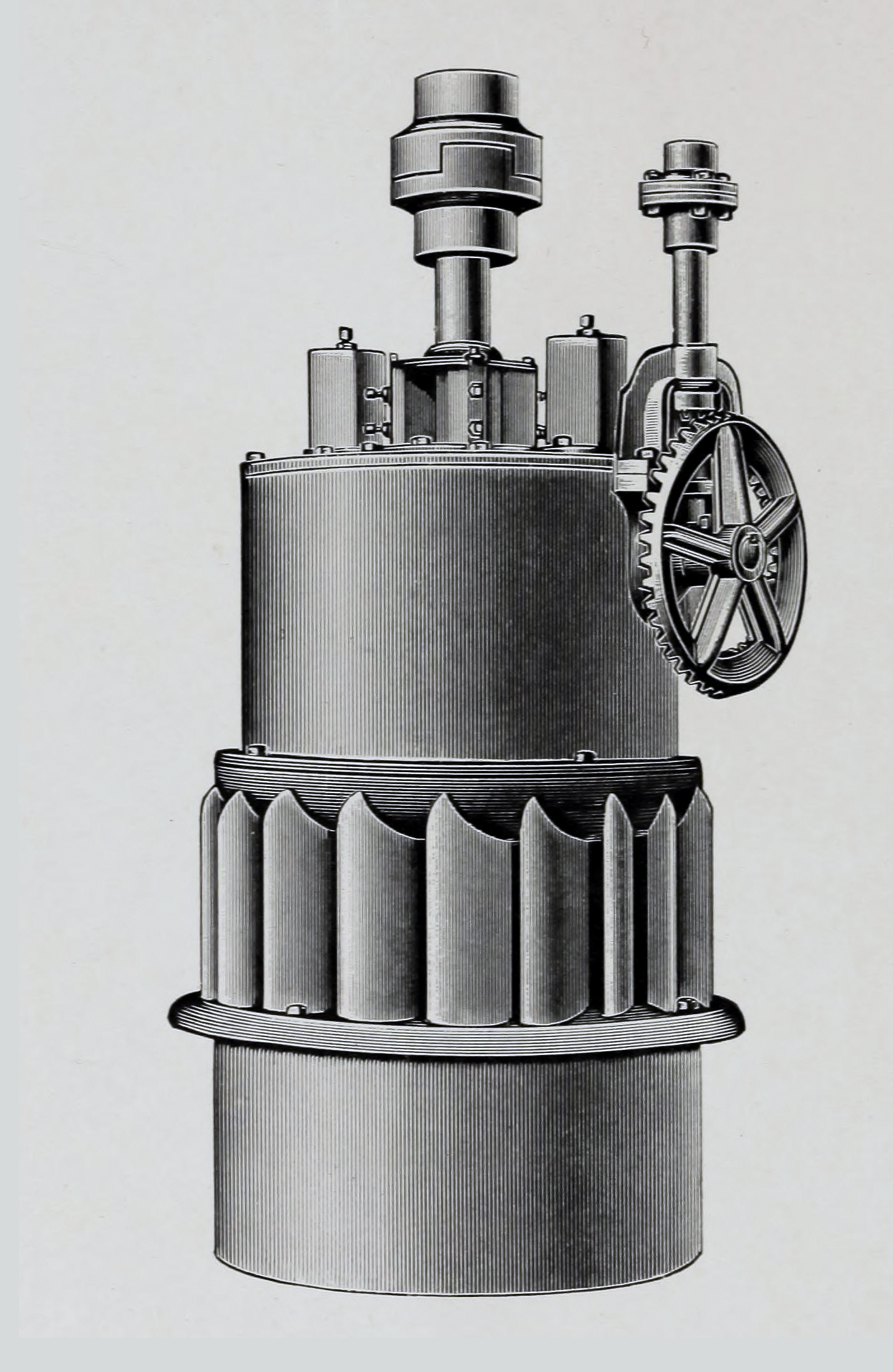
Holyoke "Hercules" turbine; its improvements on efficiency were followed closely in Germany at the time

The turbulent history of the German Empire, Weimar Republic, Nazi Germany, and its splitting thereafter would prevent the city from maintaining any relationship with the German state in the way it had with Ireland, Canada, and France, however the city would have several exchanges with Germany in technology. Although Germania Mill employed 75% of all Germans in Holyoke at one time, the textile business was not the sole exchange between Holyoke and German industrialists at that time. As the Holyoke Water Power Company continued work developing improved turbines at its testing flume, the German engineering community kept abreast with its research and developments such as the "Holyoke Hercules" turbine, A prominent example of technical exchange between Holyoke and German counterparts is also found in the history of railway engineering. A young Worcester Polytechnic graduate, George E. Pellissier, convinced the Holyoke Street Railway to serve as the first American customer of the Goldschmidt Thermit Company, making the railway the first in the Americas to lay track, with work commencing on August 8, 1904, using the thermite welding process, a standard operating procedure among railroads today. Pellissier would go on to work for both the Holyoke Street Railway Company, and was also hired for a time by Hans Goldschmidt to further improve continuous welded rail processes and design one of their earliest plants in Jersey City.

During World War II, the city would take in three German refugees fleeing from Nazi persecution, three young men who would enter job training with 70 American counterparts with living costs supported by private New York beneficiaries. One of Holyoke's photographers, Ray D'Addario, who would spend much of his life in the city, would also serve as the chief US Army photographer of the Nuremberg trials. In contrast, while spending his final days living with his son Professor of History Peter Viereck in South Hadley, poet and Nazi propagandist George S. Viereck relocated to the area after serving a Federal sentence, for failing to register as a Nazi agent. Though he died in Holyoke on March 18, 1962, there are no records of Viereck having any involvement in the local community.

== Legacy ==
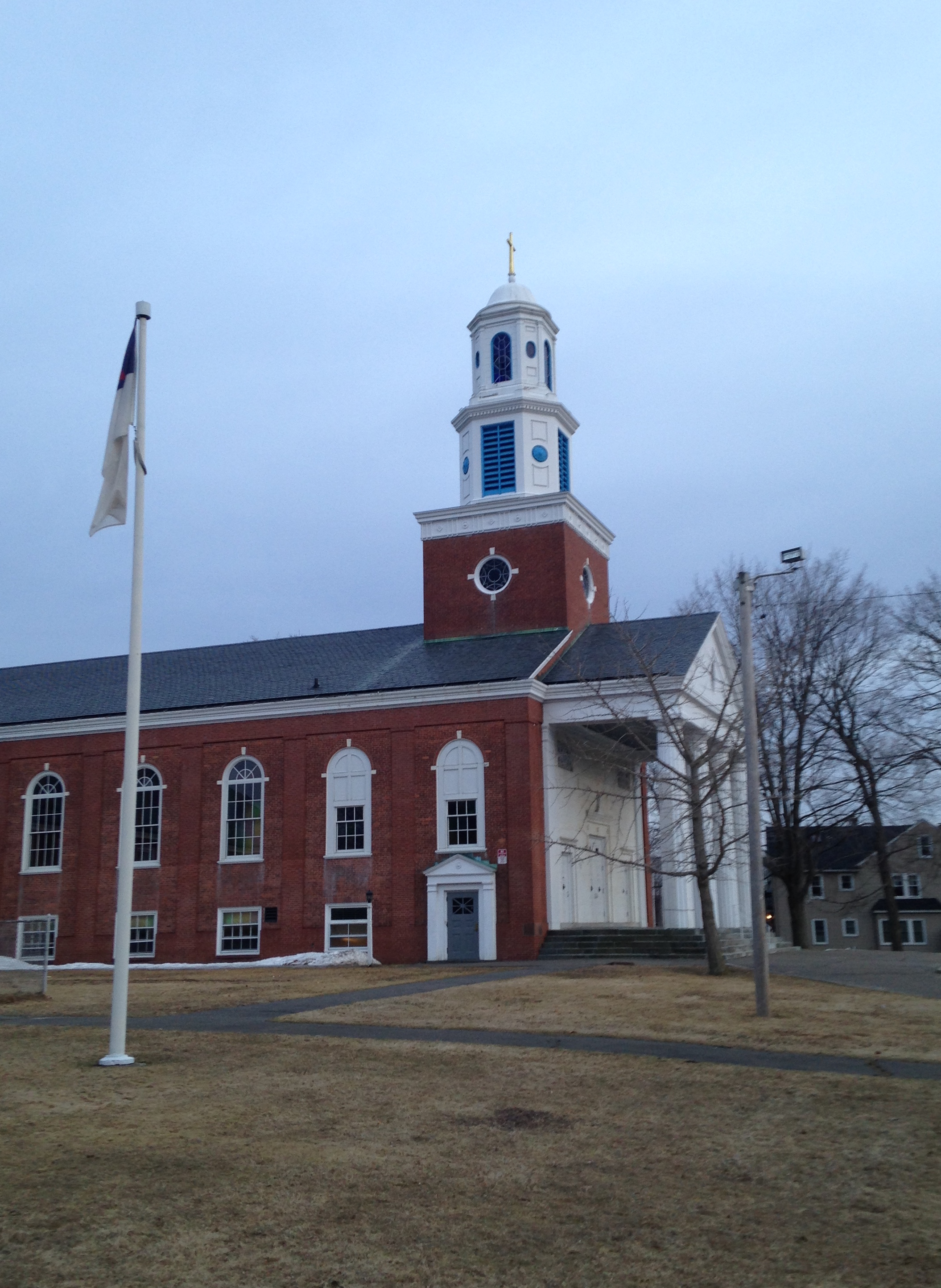
The First Lutheran Church at its current location in Oakdale today

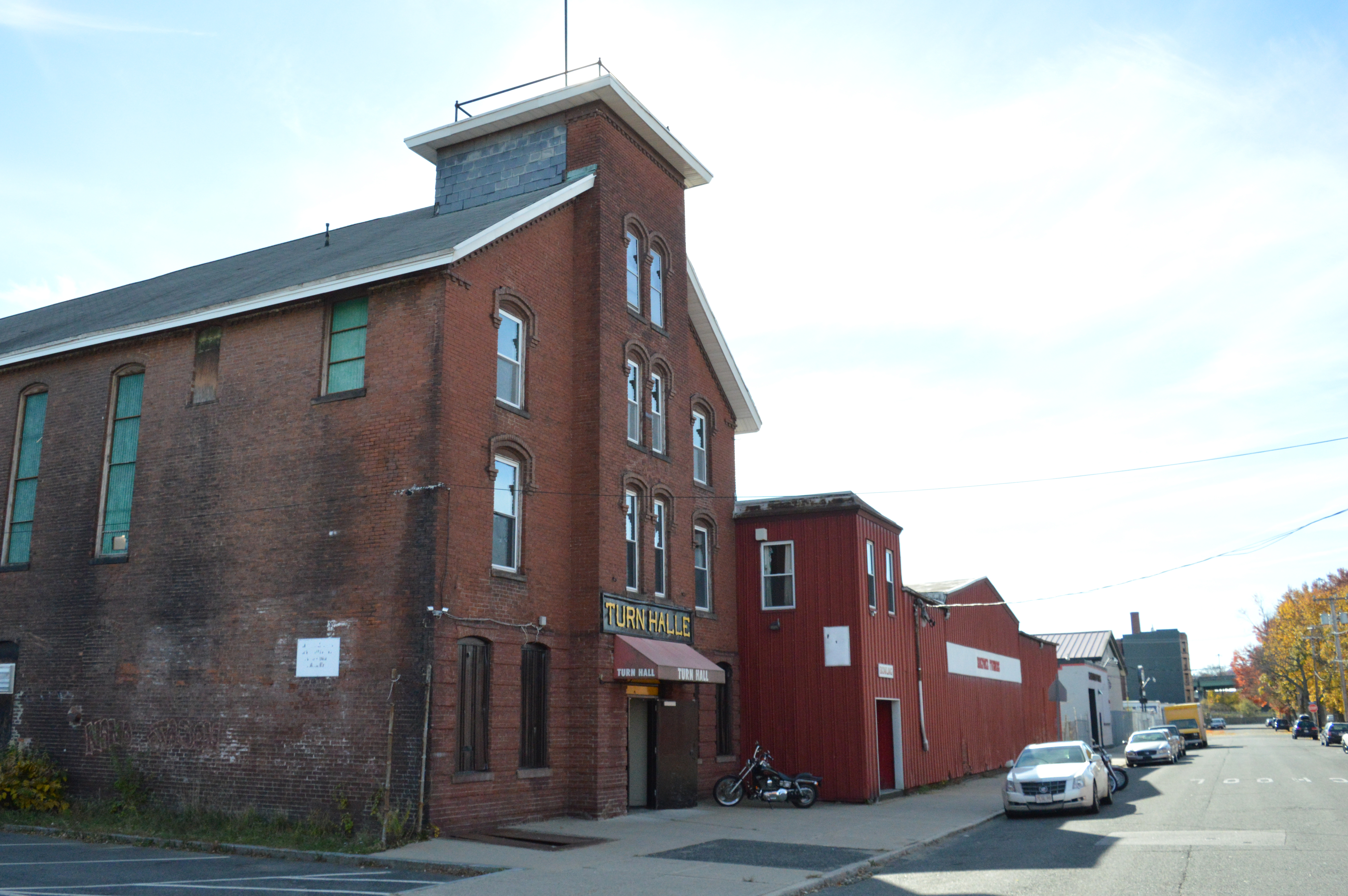
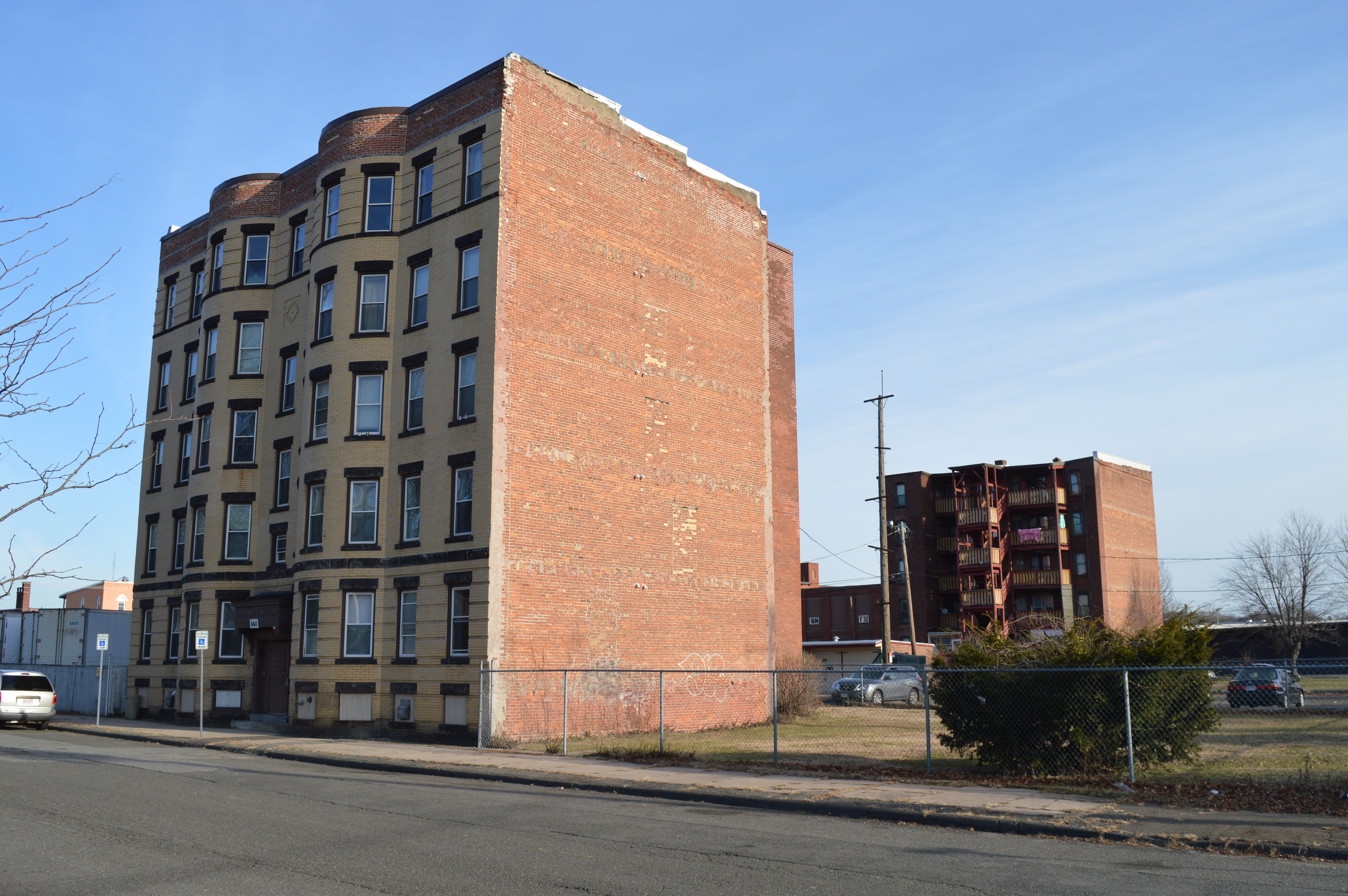
The Holyoke Turnhalle, long open to non-German membership, continues to serve as a bar, gymnasium, and music venue today; the two remaining buildings of the South Holyoke Germania worker housing complex, also known today as the "Battleship Block"; following a period of urban decline, most of the components of this once-grand complex burned down in the latter half of the 20th century

Today much of the German legacy of Holyoke lies in its buildings and historical accounts. Relatively few institutions related to the culture remain, however of the two turnhalls built by German immigrants more than a century ago, both still stand and while Springdale Turnverein would shutter by 2011, the Holyoke Turners remain active as of 2019, accepting people of any race or heritage to take part in membership and offering food, drink, candlepin bowling, and their gymnasium to this day.

Several prominent structures commissioned by former German residents of Holyoke remain as examples of the city's 19th and 20th century architecture. Among them is the Gauthier Block (also known as Wayfinders Dwight/Clinton), the Heinritz Pharmacy, used today by the Nueva Esperanza organization, and Heinritz's house in Elmwood which, with its prominent tower, remains unique among residential structures in Elmwood.

Although the textile industry no longer endures in Holyoke's economy, at least two multinationals tie the city to Germany in an economic capacity. Established in 1984, RuWac USA manufactures industrial vacuum systems such as explosion proof vacuums and immersion separators; although functionally independent, designing and manufacturing at its own facilities for the American market, it is the North American partner of Ruwac Industriesauger GmbH, a German industrial manufacturer of the same type of products. Additionally Stiebel Eltron, formerly maintaining its American headquarters in the city into the 21st century, still retains a small presence as a property owner, constructing apartment complexes that demonstrate their hardware products as case studies.

Though not in Holyoke proper, a handful of German-Bavarian restaurants still serve the Greater Springfield region, including The Student Prince & The Fort Restaurant in Springfield, established in 1935, it maintains a large stein collection and features stained glass of local landmarks; faced with bankruptcy in 2014, it was purchased by Peter Picknelly of Peter Pan Bus Lines who kept on longtime owner Rudi Scherf. From 1935 until 2018, there was also a Hofbrauhaus of West Springfield, which maintained its own biergarten in a traditional German decor, however following a long decline in business it closed in April 2018. In 2004, the Munich Haus Restaurant was opened in Chicopee, by Patrick and Hubert Gottschlicht, seeking to establish a restaurant with authentic Bavarian cuisine, today the location maintains traditional German-made beer and fare as well as a biergarten.

While its second house of worship overlooking Germania Park would be demolished before 1971, the First Lutheran Church would find a new home in Oakdale, breaking ground for its location of Northampton Street in 1955, which it still occupies today. While Orthodox Jewish Americans of German origin comprised the minority of the community by this time, similarly they would move from their locale in South Holyoke to the plot adjacent to the Lutheran Church two years earlier, in 1953.

In the 1980s and early 1990s the history of the social factors, labor movements in the Turn Hall, and the 2nd and 3rd generations' embrace of American culture like baseball were well documented by one Gerhard Weisinger, whose 350-page treatise in German on the community Die deutsche Einwandererkolonie von Holyoke, Massachusetts, 1865-1920 describes and examines this community's history further in multifaceted detail.

== See also ==
- History of the French in Holyoke § Alsatians and Lorrainians
- The Student Prince (restaurant), historical German restaurant in Springfield, Massachusetts
