= Neu England Rundschau =

Weekly newspaper

- "An American Newspaper printed in the German Language"

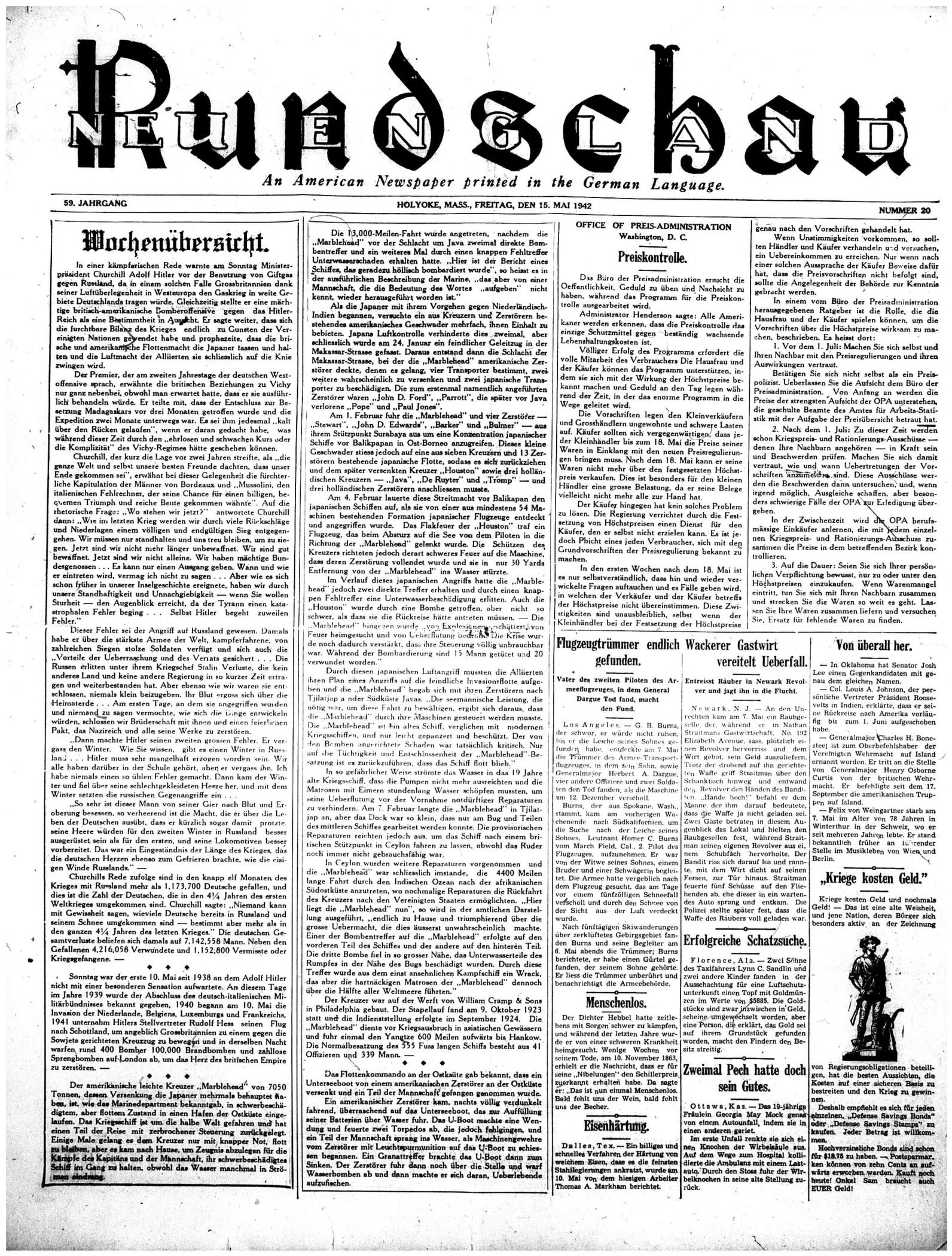
- Type: Weekly newspaper
- Format: Broadsheet
- Publisher: Wisly-Brooks Company, Inc. (Note: Counterpart continues business as The Hitchcock Press, Inc.)
- Founded: 1883 (Note: Began as the Holyoke Journal and Der Beobachter (lit. "The Observer"), merged into Neu England Rundschau in 1889.)
- Language: German (Upper Saxon German)
- Ceased publication: 1942
- Headquarters: 80 Hitchcock Street, Holyoke, Massachusetts 01040 United States
- Circulation: 4,500 (1921)
- OCLC number: 27673926

The Neu England Rundschau (New England Review) was a weekly German language newspaper published by The German-American Publishing Company, Wisly Lithograph Company, and subsequently the Wisly-Brooks Company, Inc. of Holyoke, Massachusetts from 1883 until 1942, the longest running German newspaper in Massachusetts. A second edition of the paper was also sold in Connecticut under the masthead Connecticut Staats-Zeitung (Connecticut State Newspaper). Following scrutiny by the US Department of Justice and Office of Strategic Services of the broader German American press, as well as declining circulation, the paper ceased publication in 1942 during the Second World War.

== See also ==
- Germans in Holyoke
