= Timeline of Holyoke, Massachusetts =

This is a timeline of the history of the city of Holyoke, Massachusetts, USA.

== 14th century ==
- c. 1300 – The era of the reportedly oldest instrument in Wistariahurst's former Belle Skinner Collection of Old Instruments, a guqin, with the signature of noted poet and scholar Zhao Mengfu.

== 17th century ==
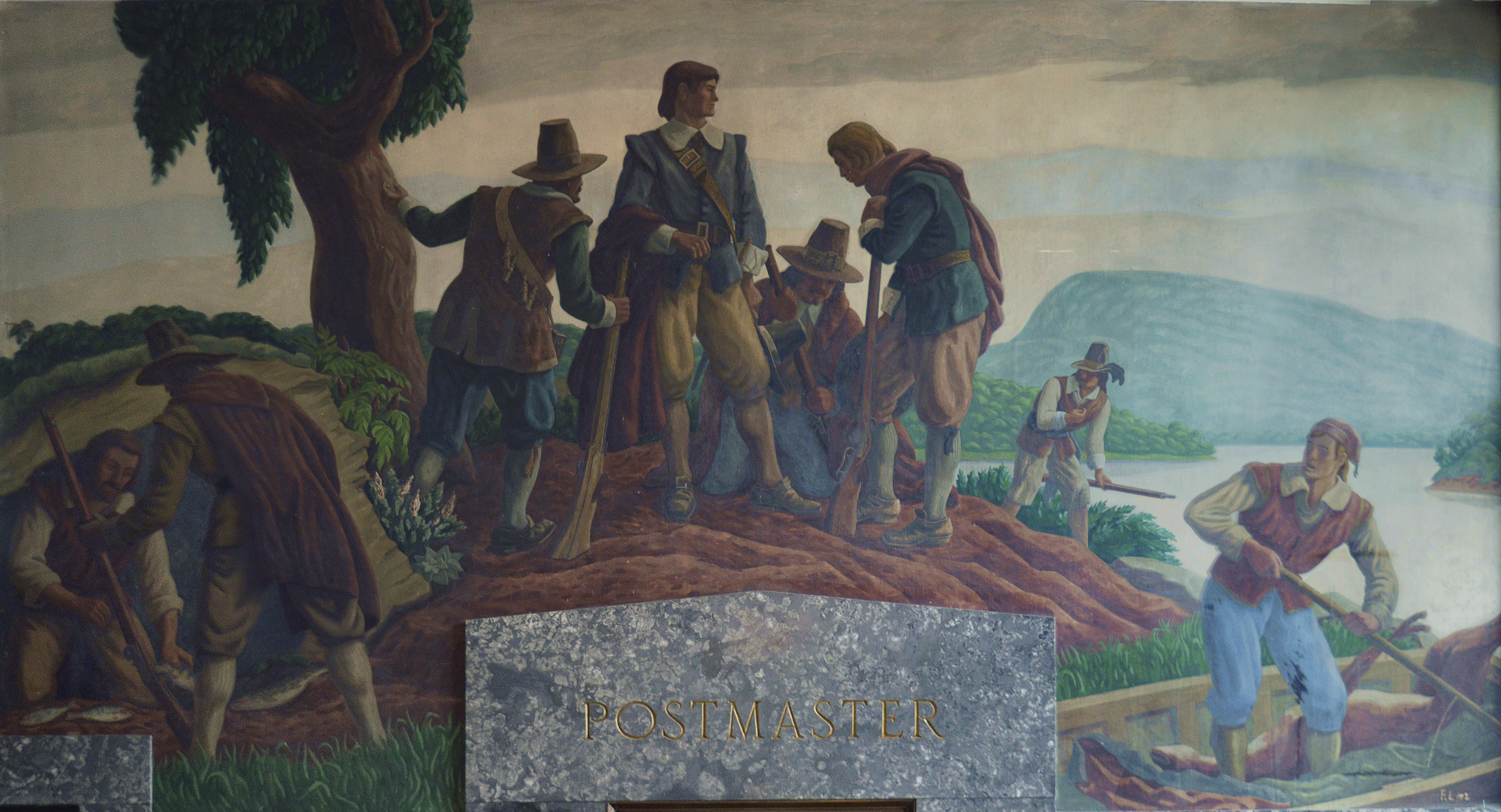
A post office mural depiction of Elizur Holyoke's surveying expedition, c. 1653-1660, from which the naming of Mount Holyoke originates

- 1653 – May: The earliest date at which the traditional story of the naming of Mount Holyoke and Mount Tom originates. In 1653 Springfield residents petitioned the General Court for the laying out of a new plantation by Norwottuck, christened on May 18, Northampton, Massachusetts. It was during this surveying expedition, or a second in 1660, that Elizur Holyoke, and Rowland Thomas, gave the names of the respective mountains that their parties each charted, this origin story being relegated to folklore today.
- 1655 – The western banks of the Connecticut River are first settled, in modern-day Holyoke and West Springfield.
- 1658 – First ferry begins operations on Connecticut River; Smith's Ferry, namesake of the village that grew around it, moved passengers from the then-Northampton side of the river to Hockanum.
- 1665 – Initial lands on the west side of the Connecticut River are claimed by settlers of Springfield, Massachusetts; one of the first to lay claim to Holyoke land is John Riley.
- 1667 – John Riley's Ingleside land is occupied by his daughters Mary and Margaret, and their Irish Protestant husbands, Joseph Ely and William MacCranny.

== 18th century ==
- 1704 – May 13: Months after the successful Raid on Deerfield during Queen Anne's War, a number of tribesmen attack Easthampton in the Pascommuck Massacre. Several go further south and set fire to the homestead of Benjamin Wright in Smith's Ferry, only to be repelled, with one killed during the skirmish.
- 1725 – Elmwood, then-known as Baptist Village, is settled; 5 baptized on the Connecticut River by the First Baptist Church of Boston.
- 1745 – Rock Valley village is settled.
- 1776 – Captain Joseph Morgan, resident of Ireland Parish and descendant of pioneer Miles Morgan, gathers a number of recruits to join the cause of the American Revolution, and serves in several campaigns, including as part of the reinforcements who prevented the recapturing of Fort Ticonderoga in the autumn of that year. The exact date Morgan joined the Continental Army is unknown.
- 1778 – February 7: Bushman Fuller marries bride Flora Parry, representing one of the earliest records of Black freemen living in Holyoke, then a part of West Springfield.
- 1780 – The earliest year which the oldest identified house in Holyoke is estimated to have been built; the Henry Tuttle House at 1329 Northampton Street, is today one of the only Federal style houses in the city with a center chimney.
- 1783 – The first mills, a gristmill and a sawmill, powered by flumes, are constructed on the westerly banks at Hadley Falls. The sawmill is constructed by Titus Morgan, great-uncle of Junius Spencer Morgan, who was father of J. P. Morgan.

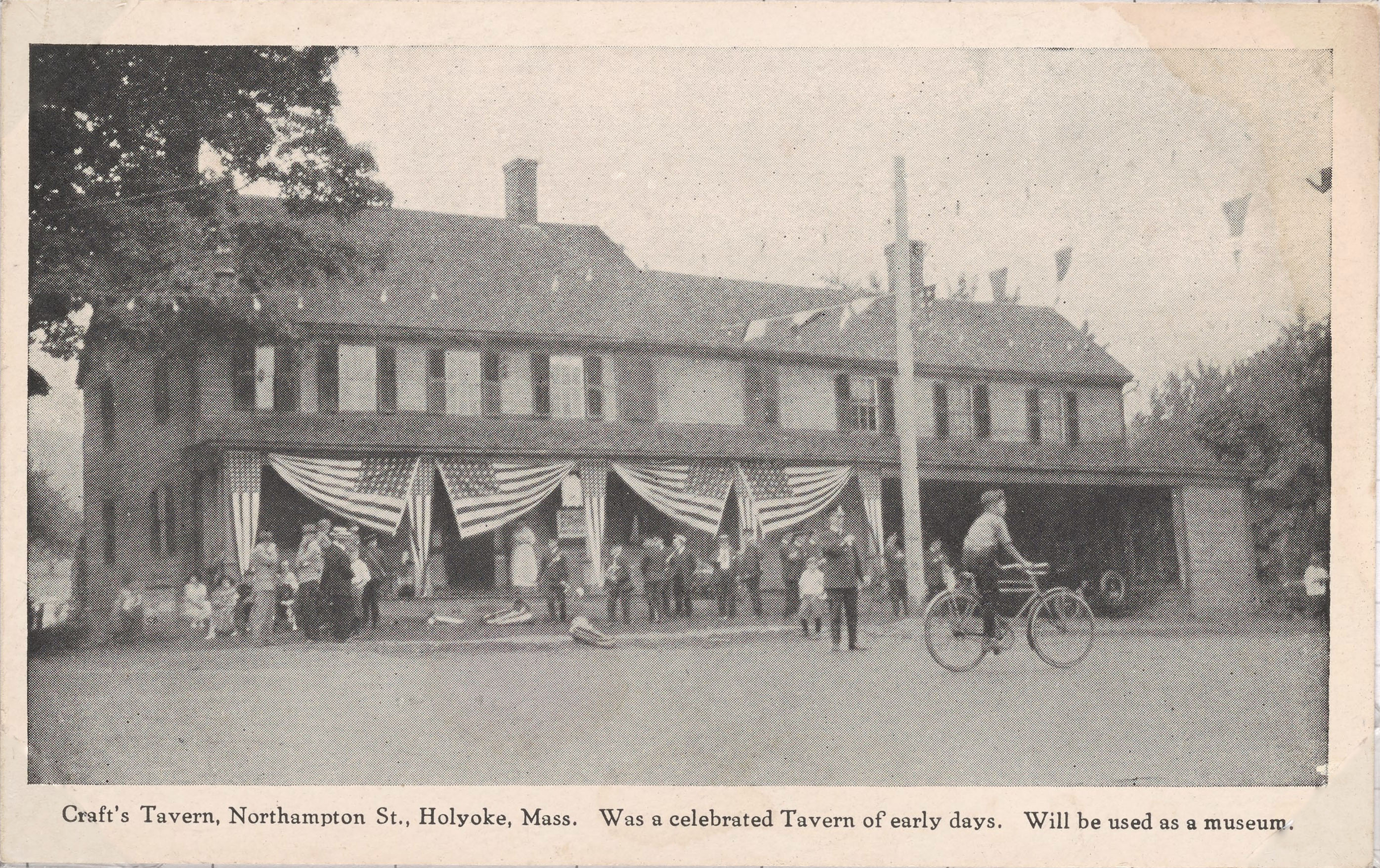
The former Crafts' Tavern, built in 1785, as it appeared in about 1925

- 1785 – Crafts' Tavern, first called Miller's Inn, is built near Northampton Road. One of Holyoke's first post offices, stagecoaches from Northampton and Springfield would stop there twice daily. At a 1923 Daughters of the American Revolution dedication, it was described as "the seat of all social activity in Old Holyoke".
- 1786 – July 7: The boundaries of the 3rd Parish of West Springfield are defined; with the exception of the Smith's Ferry purchase of 1909, these boundaries would be coterminous with the future city.
- 1792 – The first church meetinghouse is built in Baptist Village, known colloquially as the "Lord's barn", as it remained an unfinished structure, and served as a home for the First Baptist and First Congregational churches, then unofficially extant.
- 1799 – December 4: The First Congregational Church of Holyoke is formally established, with only nine male members.

== 19th century ==
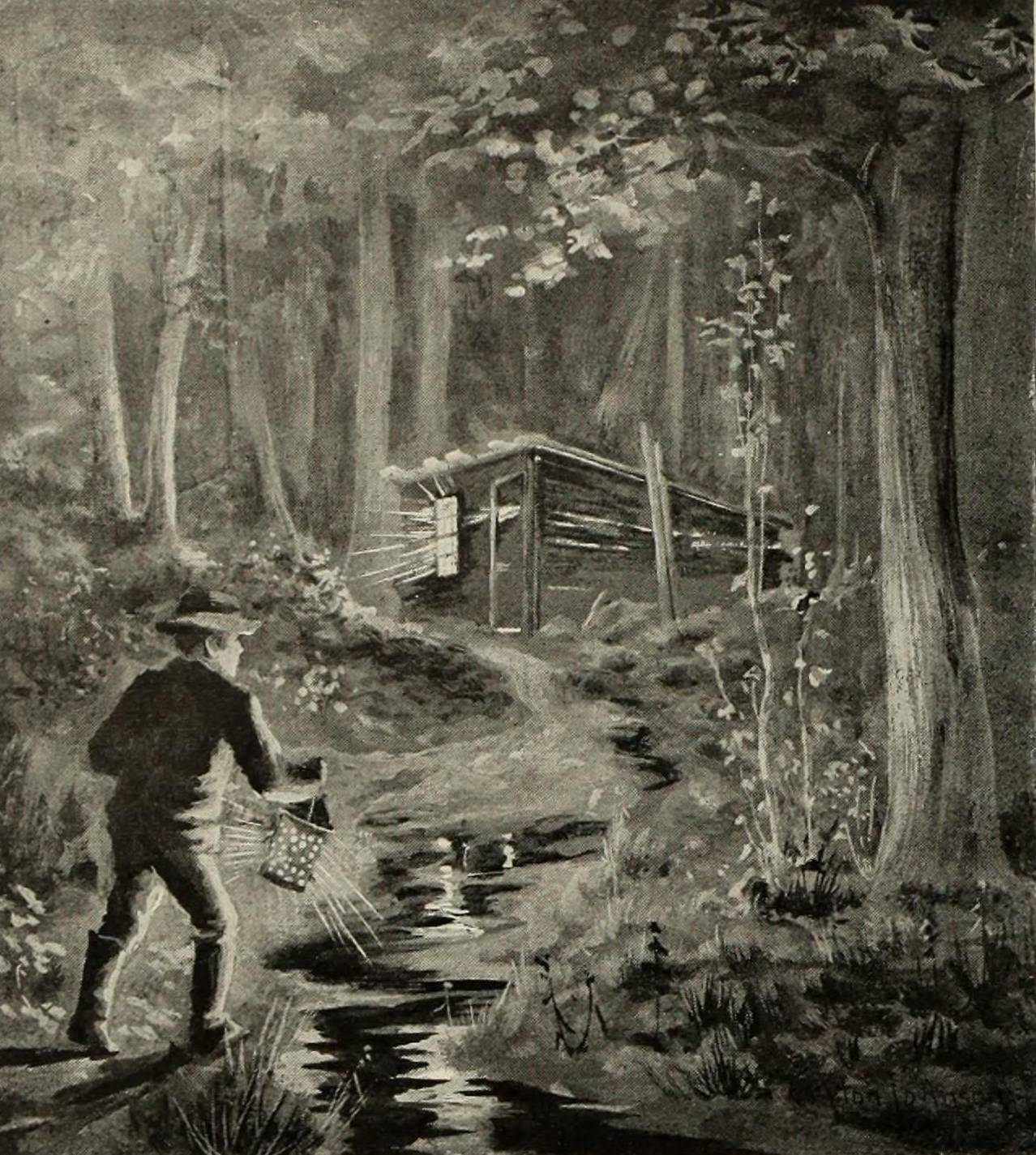
The Counterfeiter's Hut – Money-Hole Hill, by Clifton Johnson, depicting the fake silver coining operation later exposed in 1815

- 1803 – October 5: Dr. Thomas Rand becomes the first formal pastor of the First Baptist Church of Holyoke.
- 1815 – A gang of counterfeiters from Chicopee are caught producing fake silver coins in a small hut in the woods in a since-filled dingle in modern-day Highlands to the west of Log Pond Cove; following their capture, the ringleader had his ears cropped as penalty. The incident lent the area the name "Money Hole Hill" for a number of decades thereafter.
- 1827 – The first Hadley Falls Company, not to be confused with the 1848 company by the Boston Associates, is established by John, Stephen, and Warren Chapin, and Alfred Smith. Believing the area could be used for future industrial purposes, Smith ordered that the company purchase 100 acres of land by the present-day location of the Holyoke Dam. He would go on to serve on the boards of the 1848 counterpart and its successor, the Holyoke Water Power Company, established in 1859.
- 1846 – George C. Ewing, a traveling salesman for Fairbanks Scales first suggests the idea of a dam at Hadley Falls to his employer, Erastus Fairbanks, who approaches the Boston Associates and other merchants in Hartford, proposing a venture for a new industrial city.
- 1847 – December 16: In the earliest days of the excavation of the Holyoke Canal System, workers find a subterranean channel with a chamber holding the skeletons of four Amerindians in seated positions, facing the East, with a stone mortar and pestle beside them.
- 1848 –

- January 1: Workers go on strike during preliminary foundation work building the Holyoke Dam; when 20 returned to work a riot formed, and 25 men from the local militia were called in from Northampton to restore order.
- November 19: The first Holyoke Dam is completed, made of timbers, it collapses within hours of its gates closure.

- 1849 – The second timber Holyoke Dam is completed, withstanding the forces of the Connecticut River.

- July 15 – August 15: 79 people in the city die of cholera, all but one being Irish, and all but two being Irish in the early squatters village of The Patch. By the end of August the cases would drop off, with 10 additional deaths.
- September 1: The first edition of the abolitionist Hampden Freeman is published by William L. Morgan, marking the beginning of the history of the Holyoke Transcript-Telegram, its successor.

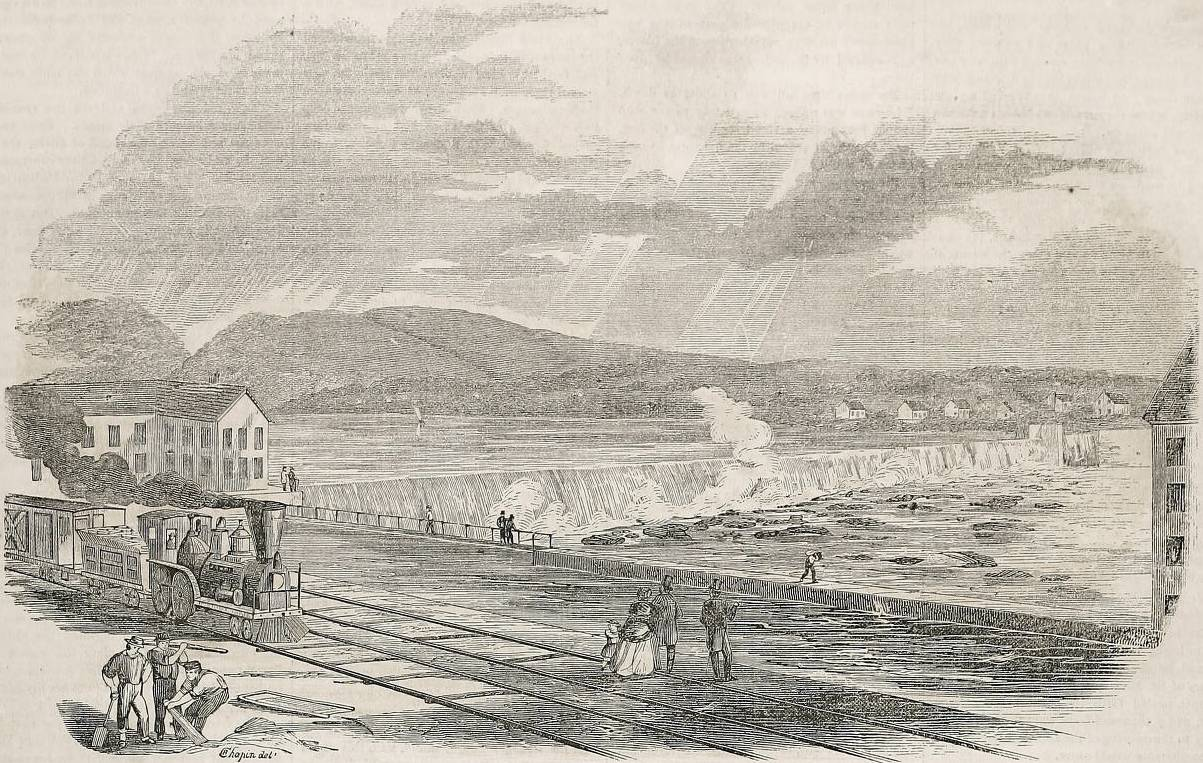
The second Holyoke Dam, as seen the Boston illustrated, Gleason's Pictorial Drawing-Room Companion, in its October 4, 1851 edition

- 1850

- March 14: Holyoke incorporates as a town.
- March 20: First town meeting held.

- 1853 – May 14: Joseph C. Parsons establishes the Parsons Paper Company out of the old 1783 grist mill and neighboring buildings, establishing the first paper mill in Holyoke, and the beginning of a city industry which would produce 80% of the United States' writing paper.

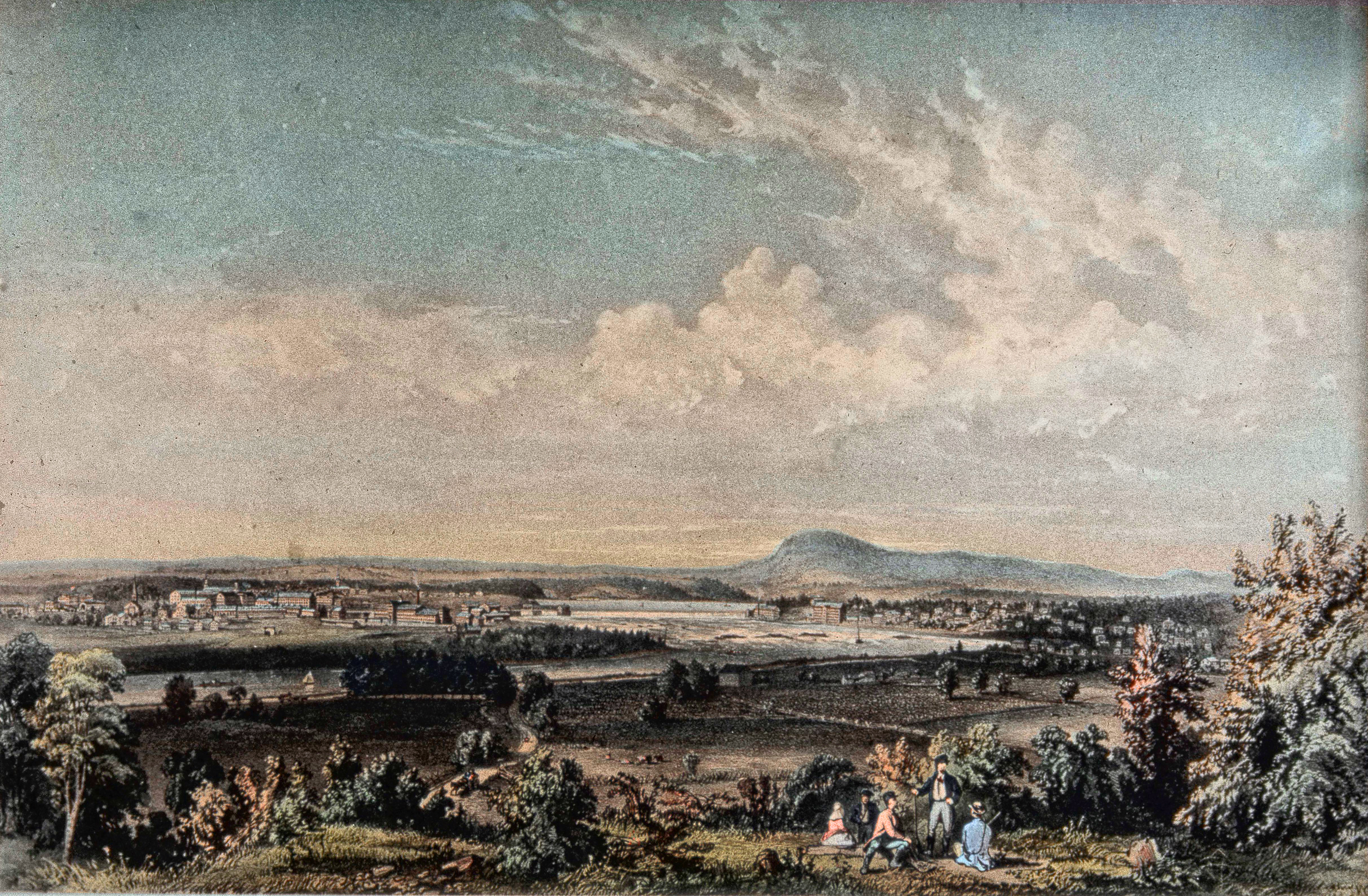
A view of Holyoke and South Hadley Falls from Chicopee by John B. Bachelder, from his 1856 Bathelder's Album of New England Scenery

- 1856 – The first Catholic church is established, St. Jerome's, serving a growing Irish Catholic population.
- 1865 – January 19: Germania Mills is established by August Stursberg, marking the beginning of the history of the city's German immigrant colony.
- 1867 – The First Lutheran Church is established, originally as the German Lutheran Church in South Holyoke; the church's earliest ministers would also offer German language classes.
- 1868 – July 4: Ingleside, the neighborhood's namesake resort, opens to travellers.
- 1869 – June 12: The Holyoke & Westfield Railroad Company is established, in part backed by the City, it is created in an effort to foster more competitive shipping rates than those offered by the Connecticut River Railroad.
- 1870 – James B. Emerson establishes the Holyoke Testing Flume on the Canal System at the request of the Holyoke Water Power Company, it is later described by "father of modern hydrology", Robert E. Horton, as the "first modern hydraulic laboratory" in the United States and the world.
- 1871 – Construction on City Hall begins.

- July 21: The first college rowing regatta in the United States, by the Rowing Association of American Colleges, one of the country's earliest intercollegiate undergraduate sporting events, is held at Ingleside on the Connecticut River. Massachusetts Agricultural College wins in an upset against the teams of Harvard, Yale, and Brown.

- 1872 – Holyoke High School begins receiving students from Qing China from the Chinese Educational Mission, several of whom would go on to serve important roles in the Qing government.

- March 7: Holyoke Water Works established, entering service in the following year.

- 1873 – April 7: Holyoke incorporated as a city.
- 1874 – The Skinner family moves their business William Skinner & Sons and their estate Wistariahurst to Holyoke, following the devastation of the Mill River Flood of 1874.

- December 17: The roof over City Hall is complete, and all other openings are sealed for the winter.

- 1875

- May 27: Precious Blood Church fire occurs.
- July 25: The Ingleside resort fire occurs.

- 1876 – March: John B. McCormick develops the Holyoke "Hercules" water turbine while working for the Holyoke Machine Company, and subsequently J. W. Jolly Co. The turbine reached double the efficiency of others at the time, exceeding 80%, and was the first modern mixed-flow turbine ever developed. The design, combining the inward flow principles of the Francis turbine with the downward discharge of the Jonval turbine, ushered in a new era of American waterpower design.
- 1877 – City Hall's clock tower is complete, with the timekeeping mechanism installed.
- 1878

- March 26: John W. Albaugh performs his titular role in Louis XI as the opening show of the Holyoke Opera House.

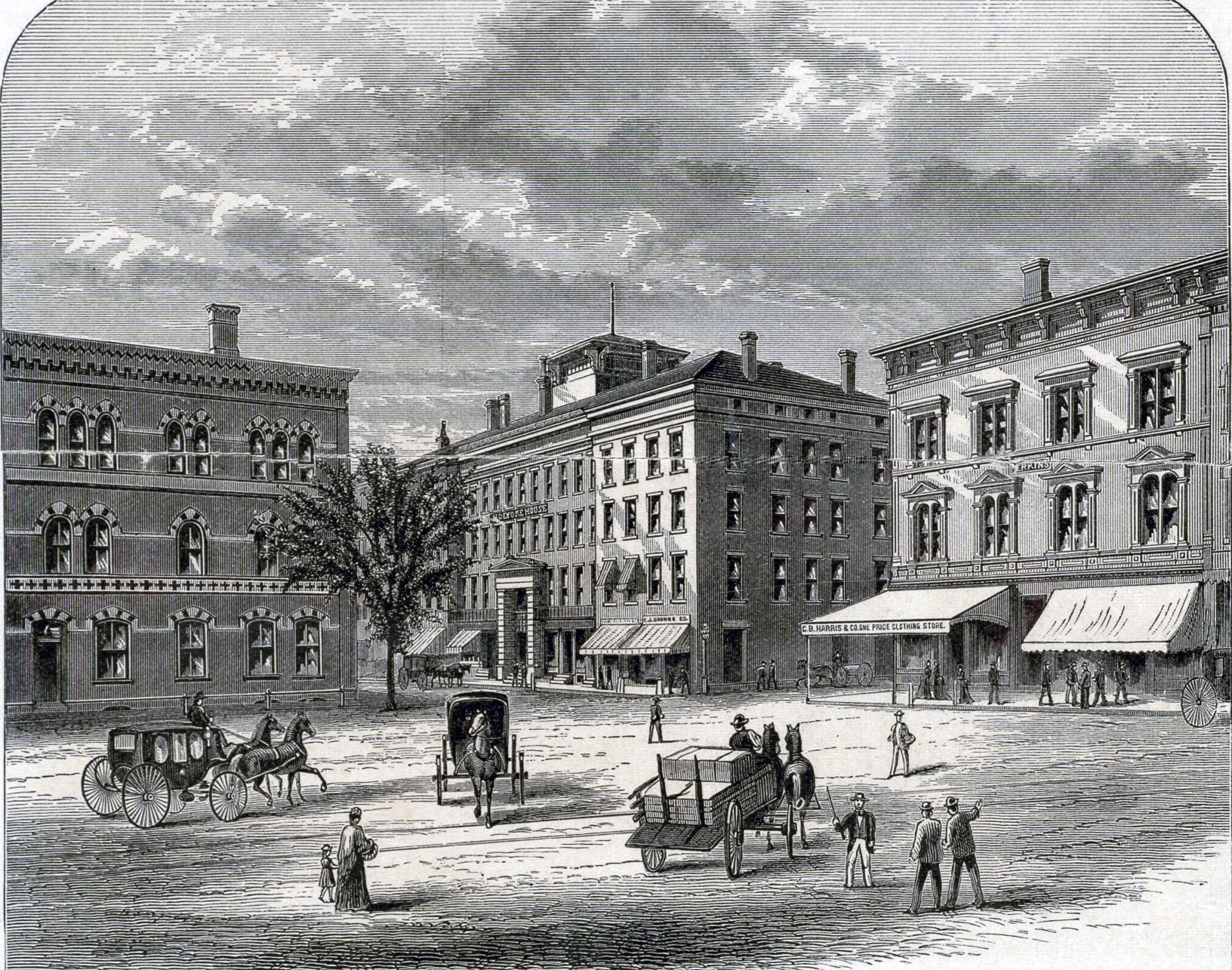
On June 15, 1878, the Perkins Block (right), also known as the Hotel Jess, became one of the two receiving ends of the first public toll line, going from Holyoke to Springfield.

- June 15: The world's first public-use toll line begins service between Springfield and Holyoke, at the Springfield Telephone and Automatic Signal Company's first telephone exchange in the Hotel Jess/Perkins Block.

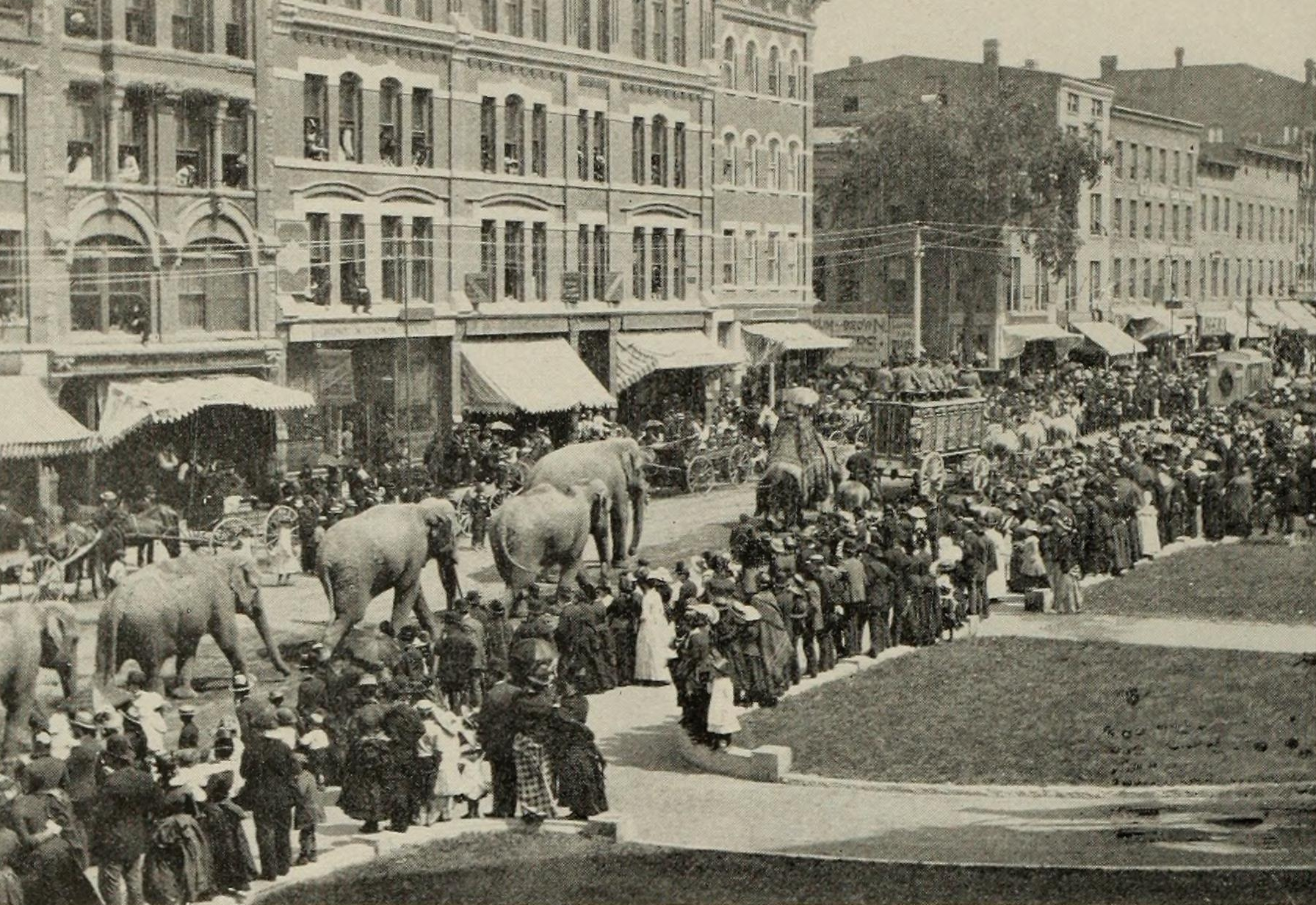
A circus parades down High Street, c. 1880-89

- 1879 – December 5: A Massachusetts jury awards $3,433 to Joseph Parker, a French-Canadian parishioner in Holyoke, after finding that Rev. André Dufresne unlawfully excommunicated him for allegedly attending a lecture by ex-priest Charles Chiniquy. The case garners national attention, with Harper’s Weekly publishing a Thomas Nast cartoon titled “No Interference,” highlighting the tension between ecclesiastical authority and civil liberties.
- 1880 – The first French-language school opens in Holyoke at the new Precious Blood Church.
- 1881 – November: Irish republican John Devoy makes an address before local Fenians during which he predicts the Easter Rising, stating "Ireland's opportunity will come when England is engaged in a desperate struggle with some great European power".
- 1882 – January 31: A banquet is held at William Whiting's Windsor Hotel honoring poet Louis-Honoré Fréchette, the first Canadian author to receive a European literary prize; among other dignitaries he is received by Governor Long, Mark Twain, and a telegram from President Garfield welcoming him to the United States.
- 1883 – March 23: The first issue of the German Holyoke Journal is published; later merging with Der Beobachter (The Observer), it would become the Neu England Rundschau (New England Review) in 1889, the longest running German-language newspaper in Massachusetts.
- 1884 – The first Italians are recorded arriving in Holyoke, with the marriage of one Charles Marano to a May O'Connor.

- September 24: The first horsecars of the Holyoke Street Railway begin service.
- Eva Tanguay makes her debut performance as a singer at an amateur night in Parsons Hall.

- 1885

- May 2: Clark W. Bryan publishes the first issue of Good Housekeeping, with offices in Holyoke until March 1887, when Bryan's firm moved to Springfield.
- August: Oren D. Allyn, the "father of Oakdale," begins selling properties in the neighborhood for which he would develop about 300 hundred homes.

- 1887 – October: John J. Prew (Proulx) christens Springdale, and begins subdividing and selling properties to workers largely from South Holyoke.
- 1888

- June 5: Clemens Herschel writes William Unwin a letter describing his development of the Venturi meter, the first accurate means of measuring large-scale flows.
- September: Likely preceding this date, Holyoke's first Polish settlers are recorded, with the arrival of the family of Joseph Czarnecki.

- 1889

- October 11: A group of delegates for the first Pan-American Conference make a stop at the Holyoke train station and briefly tour the city and its factories. Among them are officials from Argentina, Bolivia, Brazil, Chile, Colombia, Costa Rica, Guatemala, Honduras, Mexico, Nicaragua, Peru, El Salvador, Uruguay, and Venezuela.

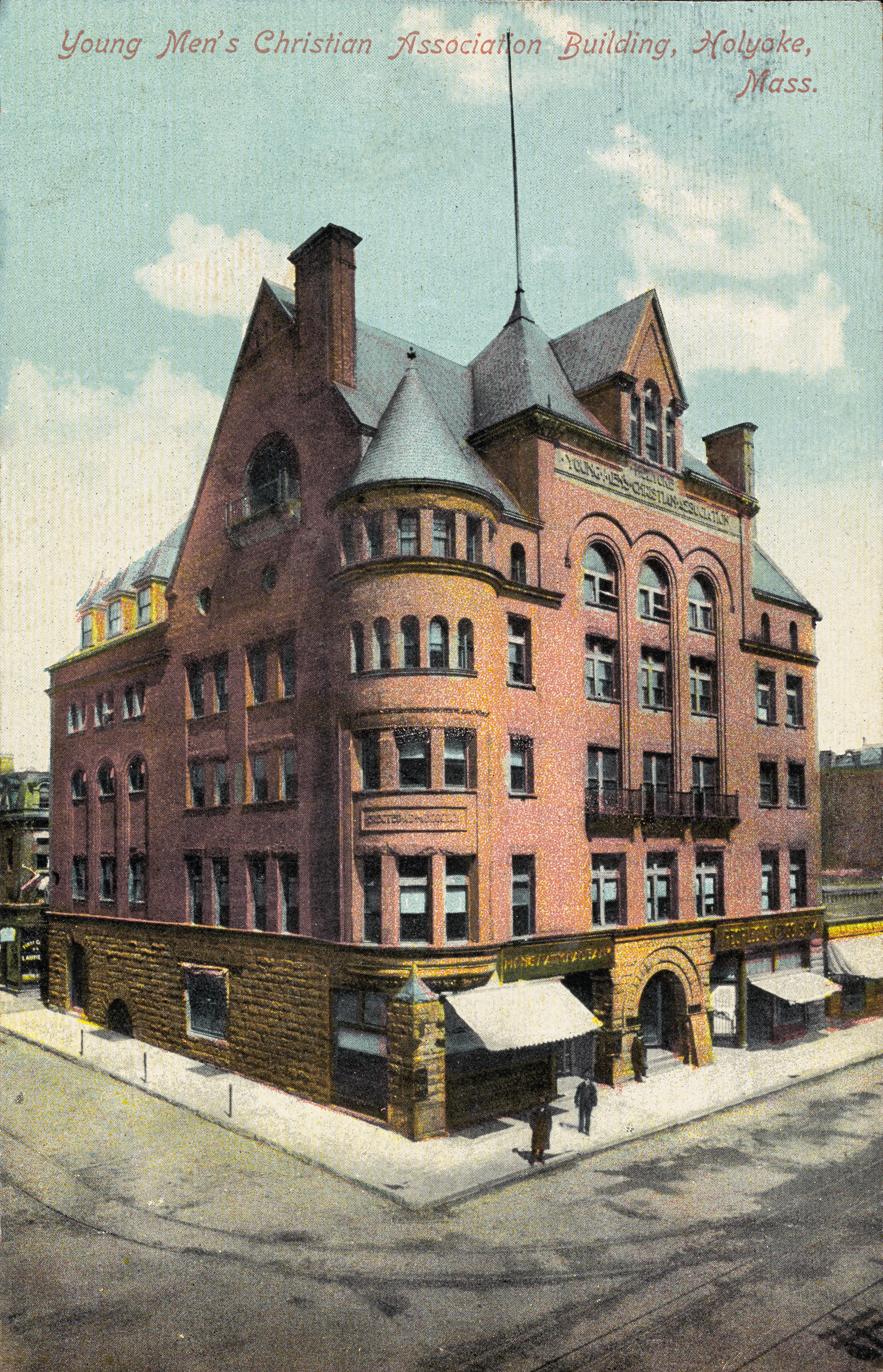
The Holyoke YMCA gym building where volleyball was first invented by William G. Morgan in 1895; the building stood at the northwest corner of High and Appleton from 1892 to 1943

- 1890 – Dr. George L. Gabler, a physician and YMCA training instructor, introduces his friend James Naismith to a group of men at the Holyoke YMCA, playing a prototype of basketball using a ball and peach basket. Naismith would later go on to define rules for the game, placing baskets at opposite ends of the gym in Springfield, making modern day basketball the following year. In the 1940s, a series of columns in the Holyoke Transcript-Telegram would appear in the sports section alleging it was Gabler who deserved credit for the game's invention, however Gabler insisted emphatically it was Naismith who devised the game in its modern form, telling the journalist responsible- "I don't want you to use this story until after I have passed on. I don't want to hurt my good friend [James] Naismith."
- 1891 – August 7: The first electric streetcars begin operations on the Holyoke Street Railway.
- 1893 – February 3: David Goetz, a former employee of William Skinner & Sons, opens the first among a handful of Holyoke silk mills independent of Skinner.
- 1895 – Construction begins on the third and current Holyoke Dam.

- February 9: William G. Morgan, Director of Physical Education at the Holyoke YMCA invents mintonette, at the suggestion of others the sport is subsequently renamed volleyball.
- December 1: Harry Houdini performs one of his first handcuff escapes at a police station, allowing the Holyoke Police Department to handcuff and place him in a separate room, escaping within minutes. This is erroneously sometimes referred to as his first such escape or his first coverage in the press of such a feat, however later chronological research reveals this was his 6th such stunt, and that he had often written such press releases himself.

- 1896 — Steiger's Department Store is established in Holyoke.
- 1898 – The Holyoke Philo-Celtic Society, a group promoting the Irish language and culture, aligned with 12 other societies, including Boston's, New York's, Philadelphia's, and Chicago's, to form the Gaelic League of America, a sister society of Conradh na Gaeilge.

External image
- Holyoke: Ward 4 Municipal Bath, Public Baths in the United States, via Harvard Art Museums

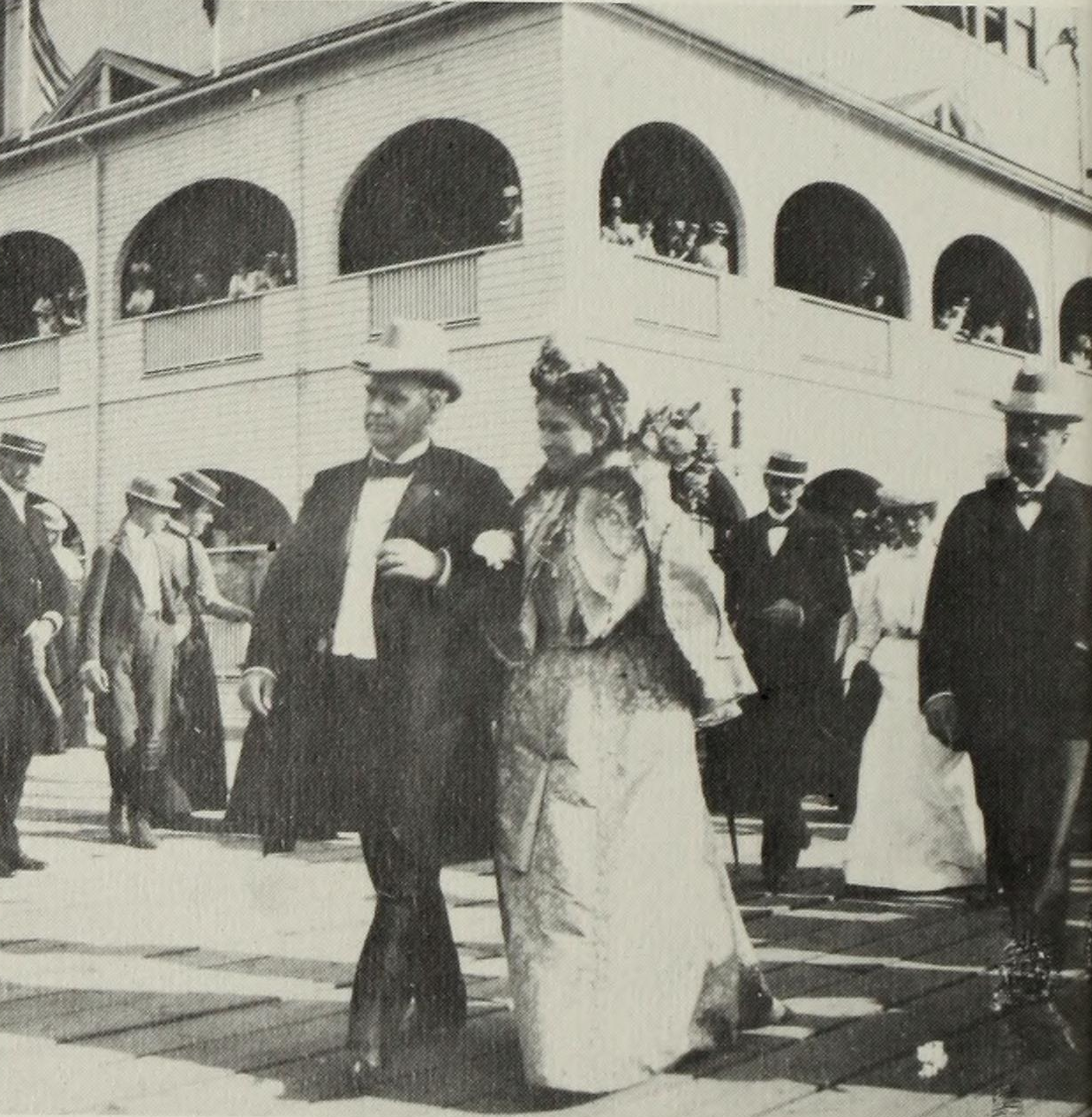
President McKinley and First Lady Ida Saxton leaving the Summit House on Mount Tom, June 20, 1899

- 1899

- February 26: A meeting is held between the Société Saint-Jean-Baptiste d'Holyoke and counterparts in other cities to form the Union Saint-Jean-Baptiste d'Amérique, a Franco-American benefit society.
- May: The first public bath-house opens, following the passage of a motion in the previous year introduced by Alderman Moritz Ruther, implementing such a hygiene program as plumbing was not yet ubiquitous. Each of what were eventually 4 bath-houses had 2 showers and large wooden pools 20 feet wide by 50 feet long, two to five feet deep. None of these bath-houses had hot water, nevertheless by 1902, a patronage of 40,000 was reported among the four.
- June 20: President William McKinley and First Lady Ida Saxton, on a visit to William Whiting, take the Holyoke St. Rwy's Rockrimmon parlor car to Mountain Park, and then the funicular Mount Tom Railroad to the Summit House. Though others would campaign there, to date McKinley remains the only sitting president to formally visit the city. (Note: President Coolidge would visit Holyoke briefly on August 21, 1925, however his trip was done in secret; McKinley, to date, is the only visiting president with a public reception.)
- October 18: Steiger's opens its own department store building, with an ornate beaux arts façade and interiors, it was Albert Steiger's first standalone store, and the first such block dedicated solely to the sale of dry goods in Holyoke.

== 20th century ==
- 1900 – Holyoke reaches its peak rank among American cities by population, as the 82nd largest in the United States, with a population of 45,712; in rank, comparable to Buffalo (83rd) or Scottsdale (85th) in 2018.

- January 5: The last stone is placed in the third and current dam, constructed of granite, at approximately 3pm.
- February 3: During his 1900 presidential campaign against William McKinley, orator and anti-imperialist William Jennings Bryan makes a speech at the City Hall, greeted by a reported 2500-3000 attendees who completely filled the grand hall and corridors, with another 1000 waiting to greet him on the lower floors.
- April: Charles Greuter, who had been manufacturing automobiles in Holyoke since at least 1898, establishes the Holyoke Automobile Company, which would later be purchased and renamed the Matheson Motor Car Company. The shortlived company's creations included among the first overhead camshaft engines, as well as one of the pioneering "hemi" engines, produced the following year.

- 1901 – November 9: The local chapter of the Woman's Christian Temperance Union dedicates a Temperance fountain donated to the city, at the corner of Dwight and High Streets by City Hall, the granite drinking fountain is fitted with a chamber for ice for cooling.
- 1902

- October 27: Mother Jones delivers a speech in Holyoke City Hall about the coal strike of 1902 and its aftermath.
- December 15: The Holyoke Gas & Electric Department is established, purchasing utilities from the Holyoke Water Power Company.

- 1903 – August 20: Workers for the American Writing Paper Company return to work following an operator strike by the Eagle Lodge of Papermakers, which began on June 15 of that year, and was described as the second major strike in the history of the city's paper mills.

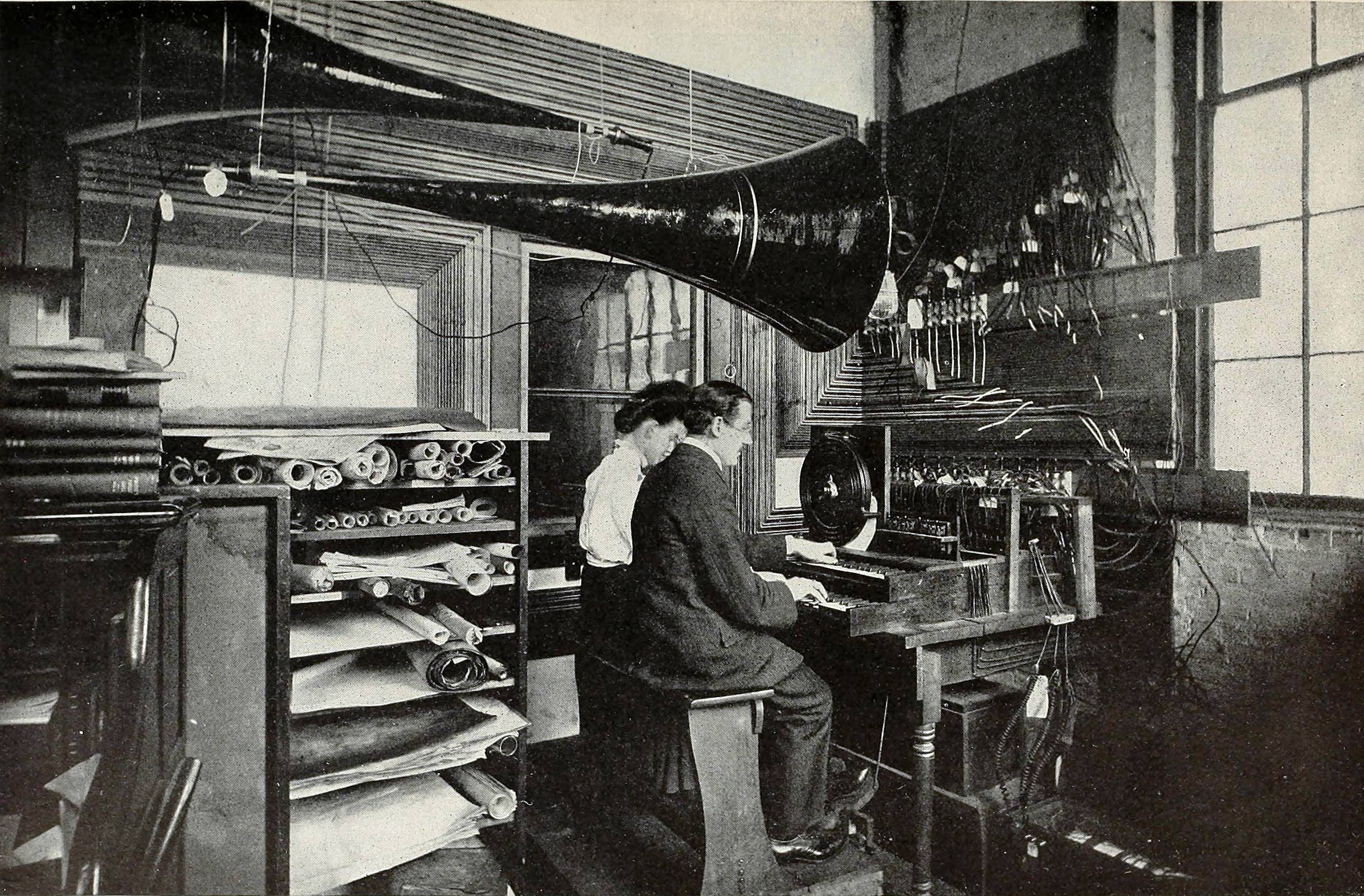
Thaddeus Cahill and the console of the Telharmonium, the world's first electromechanic instrument, first publicly demonstrated in Holyoke on March 16, 1906

- 1904 – The first Greek family settles in Holyoke.

- February 11: Dr. Henry E. Chaput publishes the first edition of La Justice, Holyoke's longest running French-language newspaper.
- August 4: Under the supervision of engineer George E. Pellissier, the Holyoke Street Railway becomes the first railroad operator in the Americas to use thermite welding to lay track.

- 1906 – The Olmsted Brothers complete Springdale Park, the largest of the city's public parks.

- March 16: Inventor Thaddeus Cahill gives a remote concert demonstrating his Telharmonium transmitting synthesized music over telephone wires from his Cabot Street laboratory to an audience in the Hotel Hamilton. It marked the first official public unveiling of what was the first electromechanical musical instrument, an early counterpart of synthesizers that weighed more than 200 tons.
- May: Chen Jintao, the future founder of the Bank of China and then a recent graduate of Yale University, spends a month in Holyoke studying its papermaking industry and infrastructure for economic research, and is received both paper magnates, as well the city's engineer, who offer him insight into the workings of the Holyoke Reservoir System.

- 1908 – The University of Notre Dame's fight song, the Victory March is first publicly played in the Second Congregational Church of Holyoke. Father Michael Shea, organist of New York's St. Patrick's Cathedral was home visiting his brother John Shea, to compose the song, when he ran into his former music teacher and the church's music director, Professor William C. Hammond, who suggested he try the new song on the church's organ.
- 1909

- June 9: The Massachusetts Legislature approves the sale of Smith's Ferry by Northampton officially to Holyoke for $55,000. For his advocacy in connecting the village to Holyoke, stationery manufacturer Joseph Wyckoff is given the key to the city.
- November 2: The Holyoke Caledonian Benefit Club announces its intent to form a pipe band in the Springfield Republican. The Holyoke Caledonian Pipe Band, which began regularly meeting in the following year, is today the oldest pipe band in continuous existence in the United States.

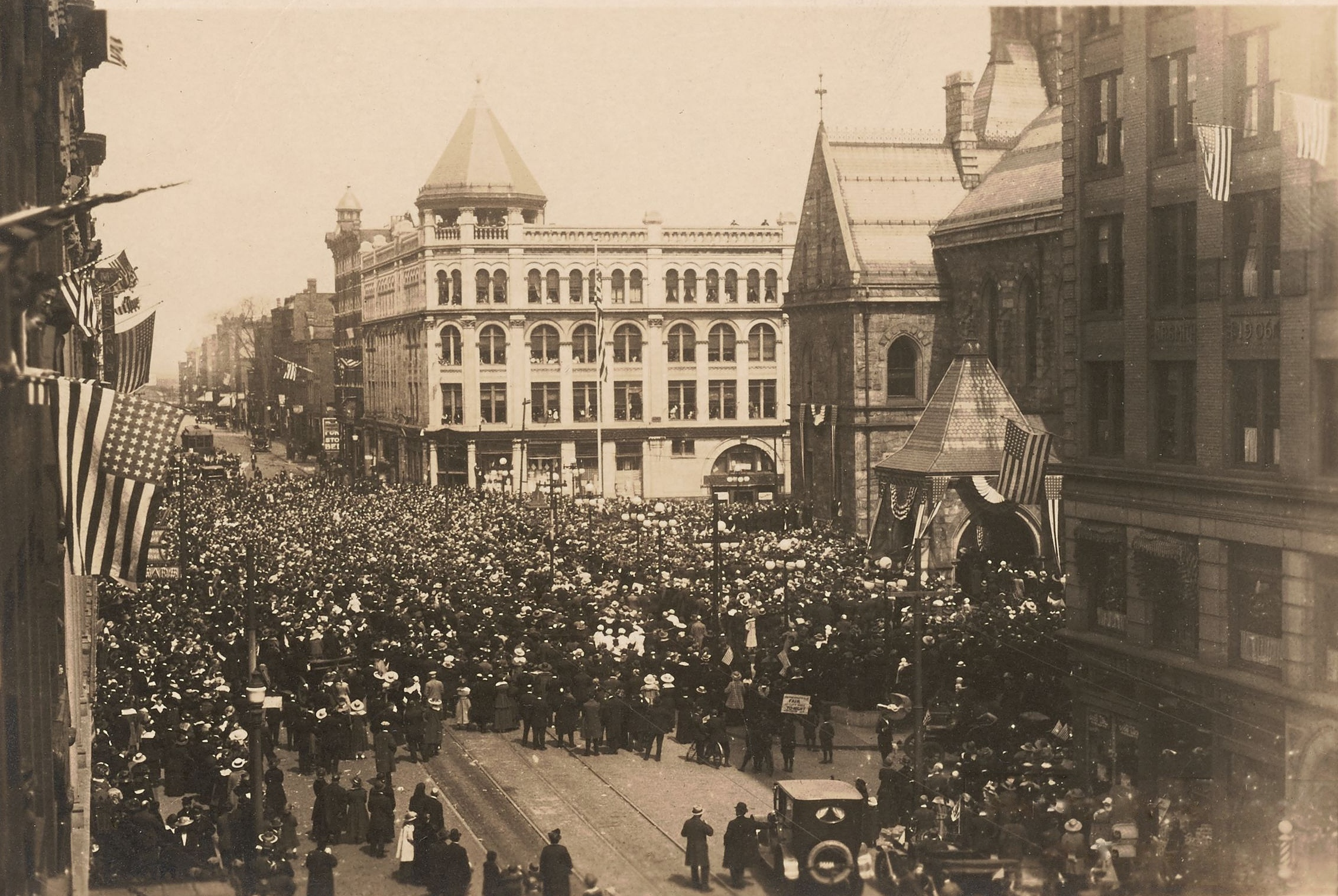
A "Raising of the Flag" event is held, with a procession from the Public Library to City Hall, May 5, 1917

- 1910 — In the 1910 US Census, Holyoke is described as the 3rd most crowded city in the nation, behind New York and Hoboken, with 11.9 people per household. Conditions were especially poor in crowded French-Canadian homes in Ward 2 where the number rose to 22.3 per dwelling.

- September 16: Charles F. Willard, the first barnstormer, as well as first to fly a plane shot down by bullet, and first American pilot of a 3-passenger flight, performed an exhibition for the YMCA at Highland Park, for a crowd of more than 7,000, and many other thousands who watched his flight from the Connecticut River and South Hadley.

- 1911 – September 6: William Jennings Bryan makes the inaugural luncheon speech at the Holyoke Board of Trade's then-new banquet hall in the top floor of the Smith/Prew Building, with attendance at it and a second speech at the High School reported to be at-capacity.

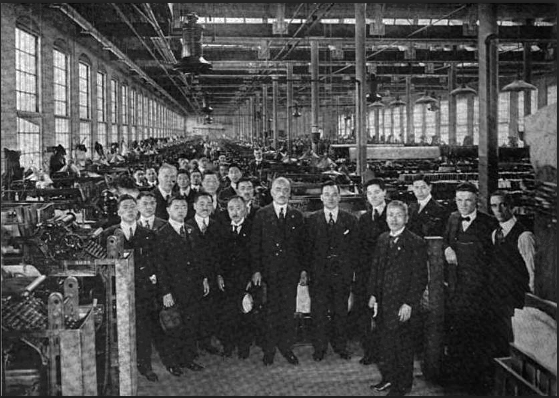
Delegates of the Honorary Commission of the National Association of Raw Silk Industry of Japan, visiting the main mill of William Skinner & Sons, March 24, 1919

- 1912

- March: William Skinner & Sons completes the largest silk mill, under one roof, in the world.
- April 27: New Jersey Governor and then-presidential candidate Woodrow Wilson holds a rally at City Hall, concluding a long day of touring in Boston, Worcester, and Springfield, among other stops. The evening also includes speeches by Dudley Field Malone and Mayor of Cleveland Newton D. Baker.
- November 8: The New York Philharmonic holds the first of its annual tour stops to Holyoke City Hall, where it continues to perform annually until 1926.
- November 18: Naturalist and writer John Burroughs tours the paper mills in Holyoke, as a guest of Clifton Johnson who later writes, "Burroughs was impressed by the marvelous processes and the long time it must have taken to evolve such magic methods, but I think he was relieved when the tour was over...He pitied those who had to work in such an environment."

- 1916 – Holyoke reaches its peak population according to the World Book, at an estimated 65,286 residents. This was to decline slightly before the highest recorded population of 60,203 in the 1920 US Census.

- April 5: Former US President and future Chief Justice William Howard Taft makes a stop in the city, visits the then-recently opened Hotel Nonotuck (today known as the Holyoke House or Roger Smith Hotel), and gives a speech on the institution of the presidency at Holyoke High School.

- 1917

- July 24: Holyoke opens the first modern farmer's market in Western Massachusetts, a novelty among region's cities at that time.
- November 18: The Holy Trinity Greek Orthodox Church, the first and only of its kind in the city, is dedicated.

- 1918 — May 19: Franklin D. Roosevelt, then the assistant secretary of the navy, opens a fundraiser for the American Red Cross to a filled City Hall.

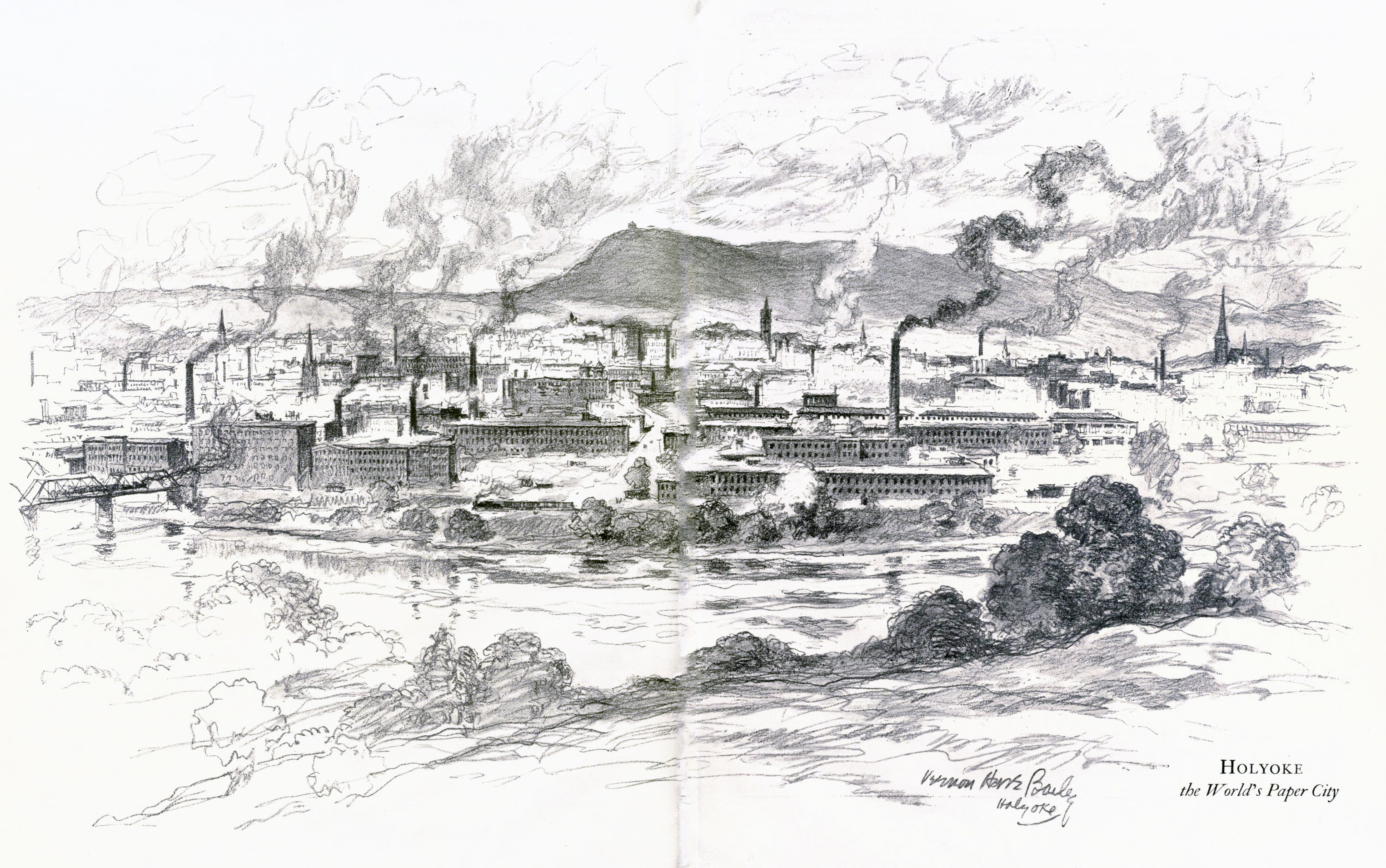
Holyoke, the World's Paper City, 1920, by Vernon Howe Bailey

- 1919 — March 23–24: At the invitation of William Skinner & Sons, the Honorary Commission of the National Association of Raw Silk Industry of Japan is received by Joseph Skinner at the Hotel Nonotuck (today the Roger Smith or Holyoke House). The goodwill delegation tours the city, including the silk mills, Wistariahurst, the Skinner Coffee House, and the Skinner Memorial Chapel of the United Congregational Church of Holyoke. Among the group are Gosuke Imai, a member of the Japanese House of Councillors, and industrialist, Shibusawa Eiichi, the "father of Japanese capitalism".
- 1920 — The New England Greek-American Publishing Company is founded by one Christ Bress, who uses it to launch the weekly Voice of Greece. It is unknown for what duration this paper was extant; becoming defunct before 1929, it would be Holyoke's only newspaper in the Greek language.
- 1921 — May 7: Then-Second Lady Grace Coolidge is received at the Highland Park Community House as a guest of honor, her first time visiting the city since her husband was elected to serve as Vice President of President Warren Harding.
- 1922 – Predating the NBA, the Holyoke Reds win the first Interstate Basketball Championship title, defeating the favored Easthampton Hampers. The game was one of the earliest championship games of any professional basketball league.
- 1923 – The Holyoke League of Arts and Crafts is organized, a nonprofit organization, its membership purchases the original collection of the Holyoke Museum of Fine Arts and Natural History, 27 American and European paintings.

- January 20: The first issue of Holyoke's first and longest-running Polish language newspaper, the Gwiazda or The Polish Weekly-"Star" is published by Stanisław Walczak.

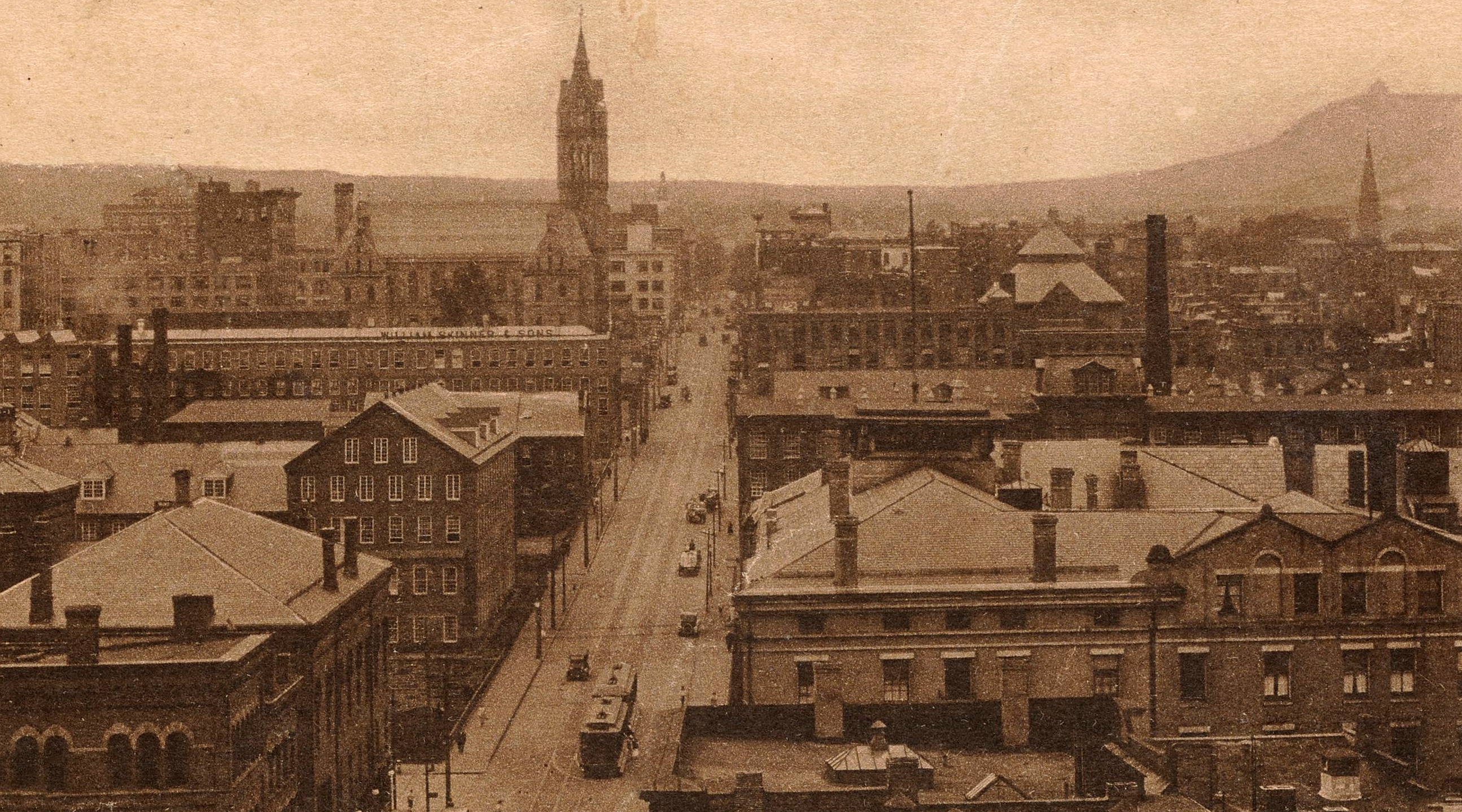
The skyline of downtown Holyoke from Dwight and Race St, circa 1925, the Mount Tom Summit House visible in the distance

- 1925

- August 21: President Calvin Coolidge, leaving his hometown Northampton, makes an unannounced stop in Holyoke, only noticed by his caravan. Prior to his presidency Coolidge would visit the city many times to visit the William F. Whiting and his family.
- October 23: The New York Philharmonic performs its last annual concert at City Hall.

- 1928

- March 15: The United States Postal Service, in tandem with Indian Motorcycle of Springfield, carries out its first experimental aircraft and motorcycle courier service on a route through Holyoke, Northampton, Westfield, Springfield, and Hartford.
- March 30: The Goetz Silk Manufacturing Company dissolves.

- 1930 – April 29: The 104th Regiment of the Massachusetts National Guard is called in to manage traffic and crowds during a massive fire at the Caspar Ranger Lumber Yard which ignites several other buildings across the downtown. High winds carry embers to the Farr Alpaca and William Skinner Silk mills, as well as a number of blocks on High Street. City Hall's roof catches fire during a session of the Board of Aldermen and is extinguished by hand, as the amount of water in use to extinguish other fires creates inadequate water pressure for hoses. Only five individuals are seriously hurt despite mass evacuations and a crowd of 40,000 residents assembling in the city's streets. The fire, estimated to have caused between $750,000 and $1,000,000 in damages is the largest in the city's history.
- 1932 – The Holyoke Testing Flume ceases testing and is gradually disassembled after 62 years and 3,176 efficiency tests of water turbines.
- 1934 – May 7: Bantamweight Sixto Escobar, subsequently the first Puerto Rican to win a world title, makes his mainland debut at the Valley Arena, defeating Bobby Leitham.

External videos
- Civic Holyoke #1, by Albert Labonte, silent footage of Holyoke and City Hall shot in 1937; via Holyoke History Room

- 1937 – September 6: The last streetcar of the Holyoke Street Railway stops at City Hall, marking an end to rail service.
- 1939 – Future Pulitzer Prize winner, historian Constance Green, had her 1937 thesis published by Yale University Press, Holyoke, Massachusetts: A Case History of the Industrial Revolution in America. The thesis would win the Eggleston Prize and was one of the earliest scholarly works in urban history.

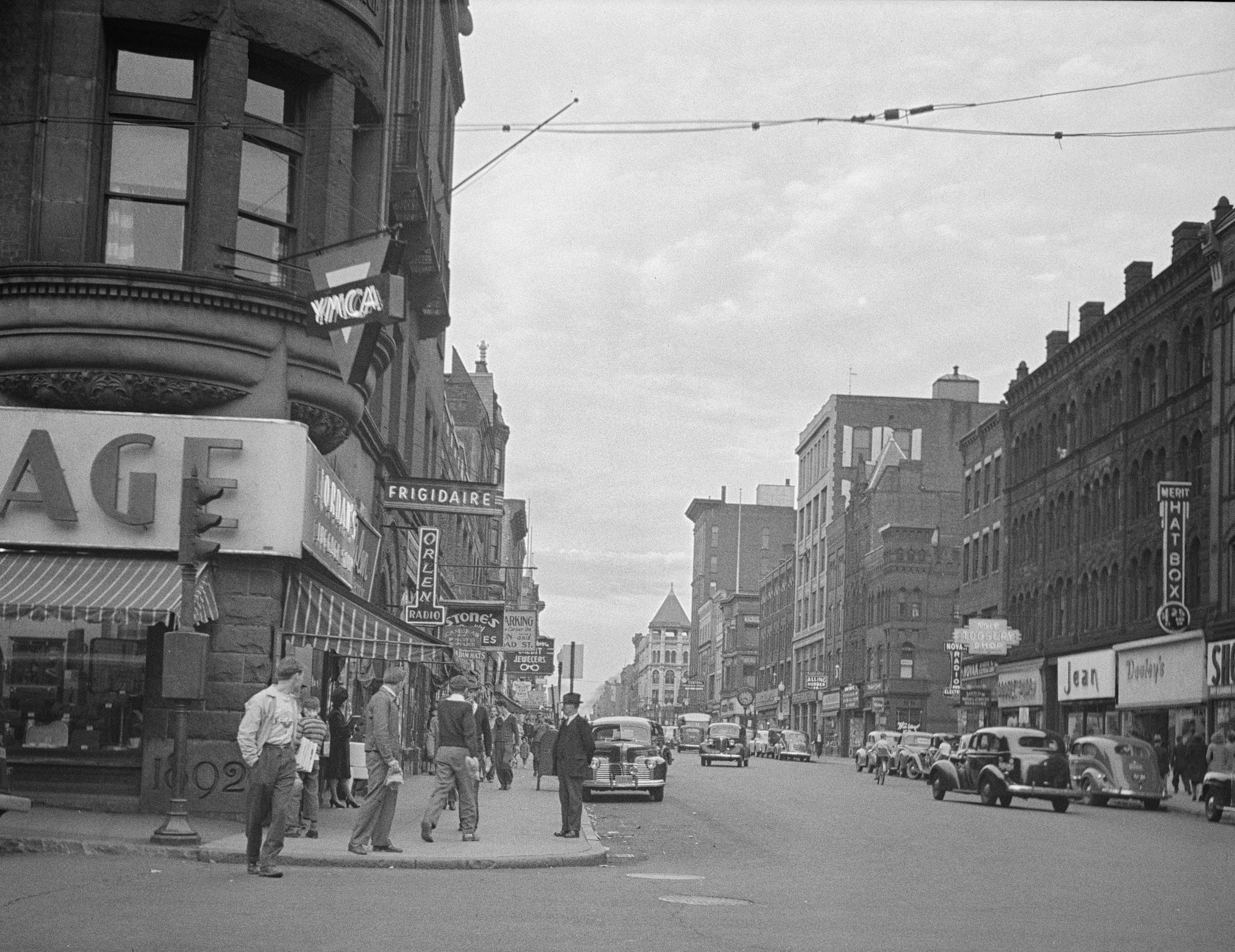
High Street from the corner of Appleton in October 1941, with the YMCA building in the foreground

- 1940 – October 17: Margaret Sanger speaks at the city's Textile Union offices after her original invitation is rescinded to speak at the First Congregational Church, following a rift between Protestant and Catholic businessmen and clergy. The "Sanger Incident" becomes known nationally, bringing attention to birth control laws in Massachusetts.
- 1941 — December 7: While driving to his home in Holyoke after a shift at Westover AFB, future four-star General Curtis LeMay hears an interruption of the Dodgers-Giants game on the radio with the announcement that the Japanese had attacked Pearl Harbor. He later describes a feeling of relief with the broadcast, knowing with complete certainty that he would be deployed.
- 1942 — June 26: Facing scrutiny and anti-German sentiment during the Second World War, Holyoke and Massachusetts' longest-running German-language newspaper, the Neu England Rundschau ceases publication.
- 1946

- July 9: The Mount Tom B-17 crash occurs. On a flight from Goose Bay, Labrador to Westover Air Force Base, a B-17, converted for transport, crashes into the southeast slope of Mount Tom, at about 10:20 PM. None of the 25 military and civilian passengers aboard survived.
- September 9: Holyoke Community College is founded; originally known as Holyoke Graduate School, it would be the first community college in Massachusetts and was initially managed by the Holyoke Public Schools.

- 1947 – March 17: Rocky Marciano debuts on St. Patrick's Day as a professional boxer at the Valley Arena, defeating local favorite Lee Epperson (Les Epperson).
- 1949 – August 22: The Holyoke Water Power Company begins excavation for modernization of the Holyoke Dam's power station.

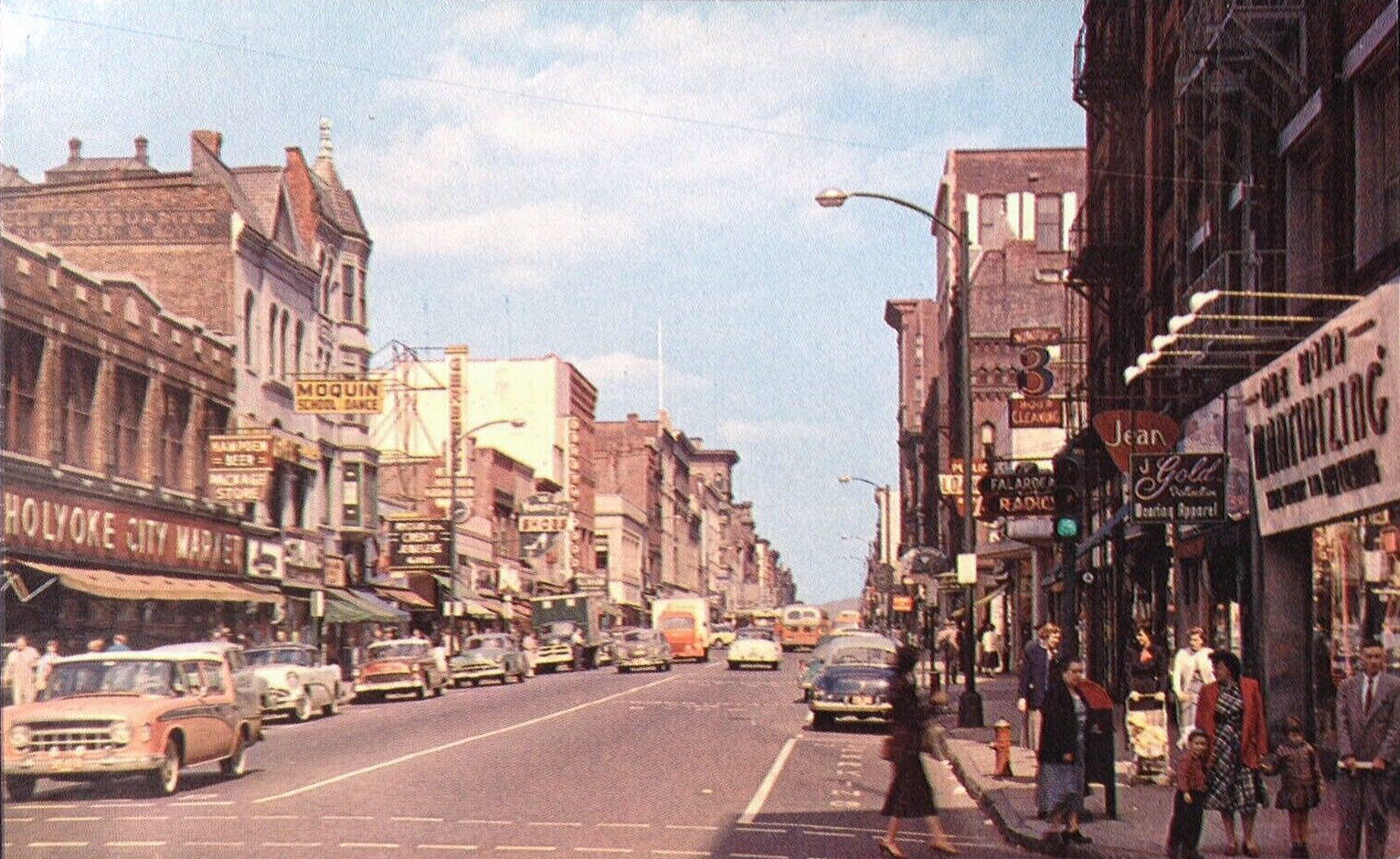
The view of looking north on High Street from Appleton, circa 1955

- 1950

- January 26–27: In cooperation with the governments of Puerto Rico and Argentina, the Kinsley Chemical Company of Cleveland, Noble & Wood Machine Company of Hoosick, New York, the Chemical Paper Company of Holyoke, and Holyoke Transcript-Telegram initiate the first production of bagasse newsprint paper, with the batch being manufactured and printed before numerous journalists, more than 100 sugar, paper, and chemical industrial magnates, and representatives of 17 countries, Argentina, Puerto Rico, Brazil, Peru, Colombia, Mexico, Cuba, the Dominican Republic, Haiti, Australia, India, Indonesia, Pakistan, China, South Africa, Turkey, and the United Kingdom.
- November 16–17: Despite preservation efforts the 165 year-old Crafts' Tavern, already slated for demolition for the new John J. Lynch School, is thoroughly damaged over two nights by 20 juvenile vandals residing in the Highlands neighborhood; they break an estimated 400 panes of glass and tore doors, windows, and trim from plaster.
- December 1: As a part of the newly built Jewish community center on Maple Street, the Sons of Zion Synagogue is formally dedicated.

- 1951 – November 7: The new power station of the Holyoke Dam is brought online, following its two year modernization project.
- 1952

- March 23: The first annual Holyoke Saint Patrick's Day Parade is held; following a period of absence since a previous parade celebration in 1901.
- April 27: The Soldiers' Home in Holyoke is dedicated by Governor Paul A. Dever, and former AMVETS national commander Harold Russell, before a crowd of 15,000.

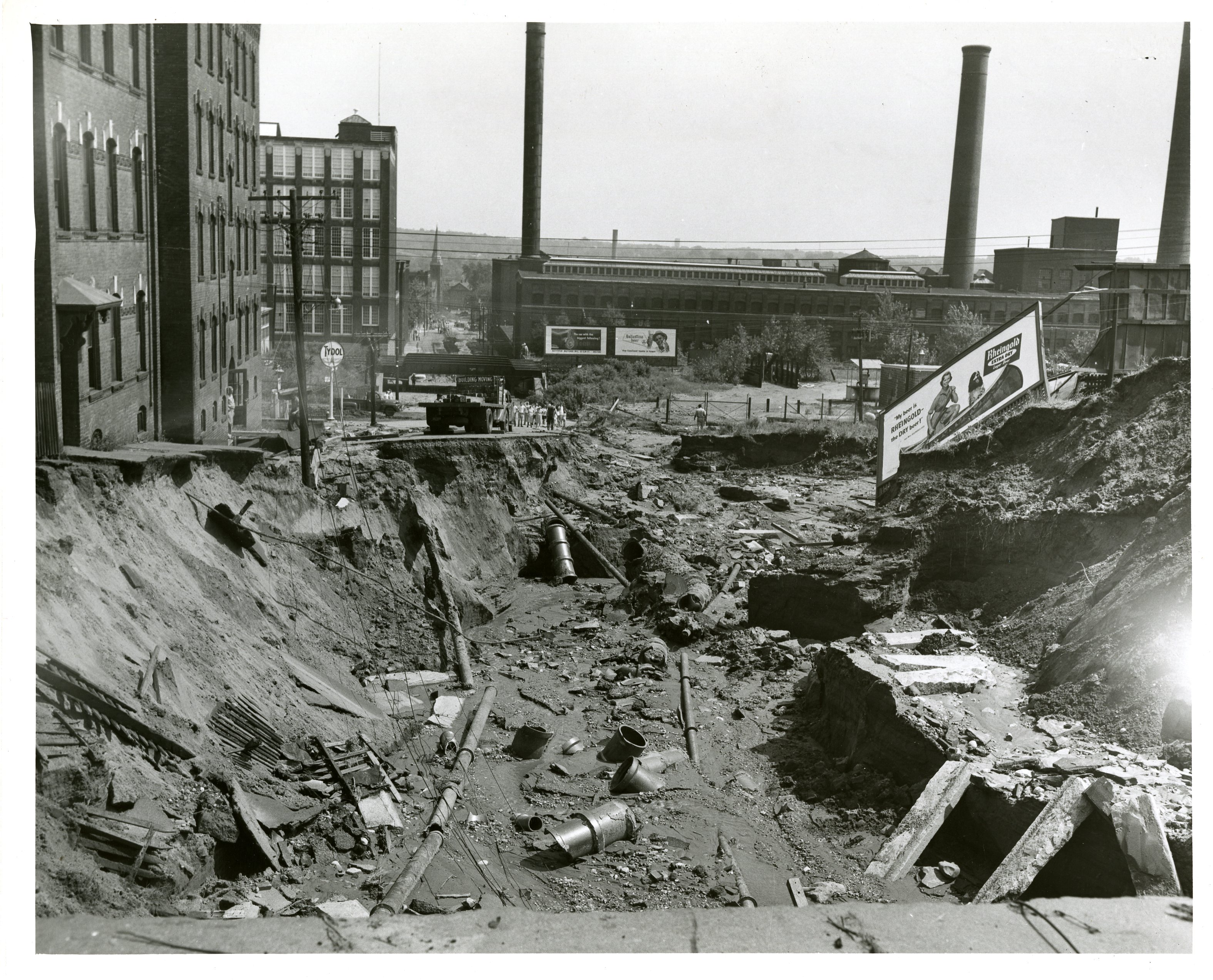
A view of a washout looking down Jackson Street from High, August 20, 1955, after the 1955 Connecticut floods

- 1956 – The former Polish language Gwiazda, then known only as The Star, being published primarily in English since 1953, ceases publication.

- January: The Holyoke Water Power Company is awarded a Conservation Service Award by the US Department of the Interior for their successful implementation of a fish ladder in the Holyoke Dam to allow American shad and other fish to migrate freely upstream.
- April 26: William G. Dwight, publisher of the Holyoke Transcript-Telegram, is elected president of the American Newspaper Publishers Association (ANPA), succeeding the Richard Slocum, editor of the Philadelphia Bulletin. Dwight would use this post to effectively lobby for the opening of China to American journalists by the state department.

- 1958

- March 16: Senator John F. Kennedy receives the first St. Patrick's Parade honor as outstanding American citizen of Irish parentage; the award would subsequently be renamed in his honor following his death.
- April 1: The Massachusetts General Court dedicates the Joseph E. Muller Bridge to its namesake.

- 1959 – June: Wistariahurst is donated to the City by the Skinner family and made the permanent home of the Holyoke Museum of Fine Arts and Natural History, previously maintained in the library building.

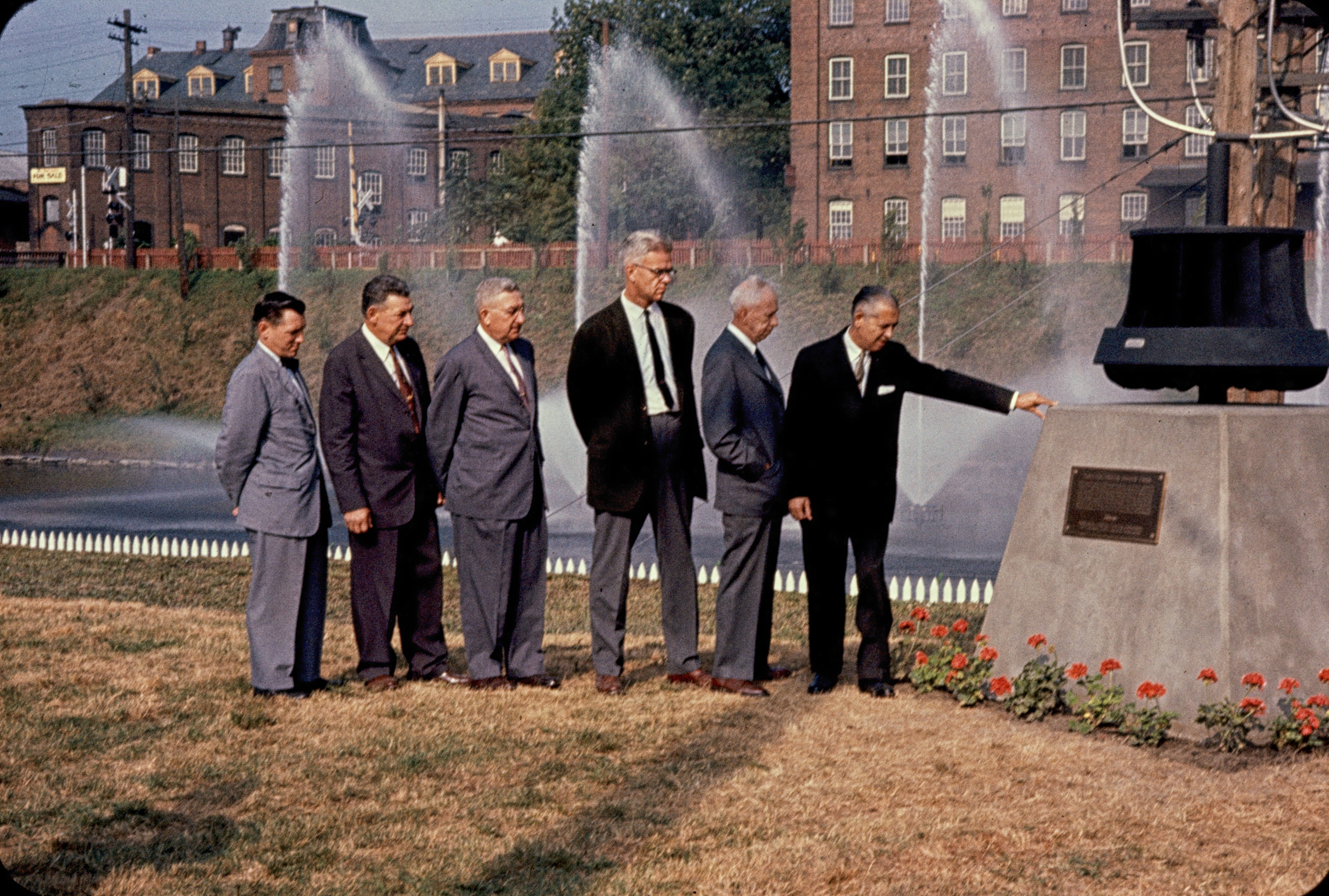
Mayor Resnic dedicates Holyoke Water Power Park, with a "Hercules" turbine wheel seen here, along with Robert E. Barrett, and William Skinner II, September 9, 1960

- 1960

- November 15: U.S. Representative from Michigan Gerald Ford makes a dinner speech at the Roger Smith Hotel during the annual meeting of the Holyoke Chamber of Commerce, criticizing defense spending and discussing other domestic issues being raised in the next session of Congress.
- December 17: Mount Tom Ski Area opens for its first season.

- 1961 – Whiting Farms Road is completed. Constructed prior to the completion of Interstate 91 for the new Regional Business Development Corporation's industrial park, initially the road is known by critics as the "Road to Nowhere".

- January 26: William Skinner and Sons closes and is sold to Indian Head Mills, which converts the former silk maker's facilities to manufacture rayon.

- 1962 – December 23: Holyoke's tallest commercial building, the Hotel Essex, originally known as the LaFrance Hotel, for its developer, suffers a two-alarm fire gutting much of its upper 4 floors. Its closure marks the last time the building would be used as a hotel, before being converted into apartments after a decade of renovation plans and foreclosures. With Roger Williams Hotel closing in the previous year, its closure marked a period in which the city had no hotels in operation.
- 1963 – The former Skinner Silk Mill, then manufacturing rayon under Indian Head Mills, closes altogether, marking the end of the once-largest silk mill in the world being used for textile manufacturing.
- 1964

- January 13: With the death of longtime editor Roméo-Dadace Raymond in late 1963, and a decline in New England French in the Greater Holyoke-Springfield area, Holyoke's longest-running French language newspaper La Justice publishes its final issue.
- August 28: J. Herman Stursberg, descendant of the founders of Germania Mills and the Holyoke German Colony, announces the closure of their Livingston Worsted Fabrics line, citing globalization and prices being undercut by imports produced with lower labor standards.

- 1966 – Following a prolonged period of declining ridership, the Boston and Maine Railroad discontinues passenger rail service to the city.

- January 15: Holyoke switches to a single ZIP code, making 01041 only a PO box code and putting 01042 out of service. ZIP codes 01042 through 01049 remained reserved but unassigned due to prior expected growth of the city.

- 1967 – Construction begins on Interstate 391.

- June 11: The National Amateur Athletic Union Marathon takes place, beginning at Mountain Park, crossing the Willimansett Bridge to Chicopee Falls, returning the same way. The race became known as "The Torture in the Holyoke Tropics". In 92 °F (33 °C) heat and high humidity, 38 of 125 runners finished, with notables Tom Laris, Lou Castagnola, John J. Kelley, Amby Burfoot, among those dropping out. Ron Daws won and represented the United States in the Pan American Games.
- October 29: The Holyoke Opera House is razed by fire.

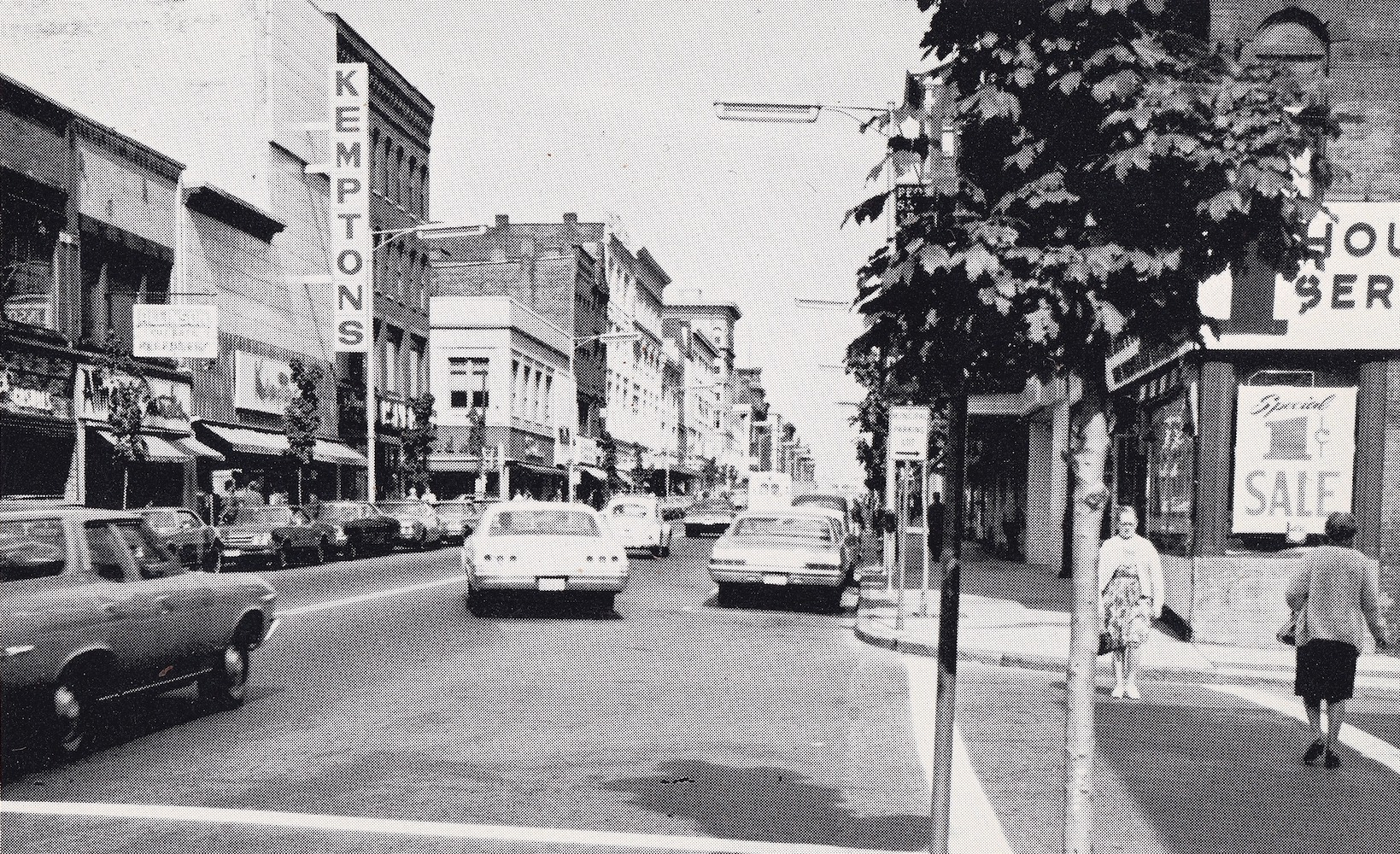
High Street seen from Division Street, shortly before High was made a one-way street, circa 1970

- 1972 – Bodybuilding journalist Charles Gaines asks photographer George Butler to join him in covering the International Federation of Bodybuilding and Fitness's (IFBB) 1972 "Mr. East Coast" competition at Mountain Park for Sports Illustrated. The shoot included winner Leon Brown, who became the first bodybuilder to be showcased in the magazine. Arnold Schwarzenegger was also featured at the competition as a guest poser, and having met Gaines and Butler at the event, the three would go on to make Pumping Iron, a book and movie which introduced bodybuilding to the American mainstream, having been a largely obscure subculture up until that time.
- 1973 – July 27–31: Following a disturbance between police and residents when a local man was arrested for stealing a bicycle, Mayor William Taupier imposes a 6pm to 6am curfew on The Flats, requiring residents to present identification to access their homes. After a review of the incident by the aldermen and Model Cities Program administrators, the resulting political fallout ends the Team Policing program in favor of regular patrols.
- 1977 – April 25: The Holyoke Millers, a Minor League Baseball team, make their home debut at Mackenzie Stadium following a rain delay the previous day, losing 7-5 against the Waterbury Giants.
- 1979 – Michael Kittredge opens his first factory in Holyoke for Yankee Candle, renting space from an older mill building.

- July 5: The Holyoke Mall at Ingleside opens, with G. Fox, JCPenney, Sears, and Steiger's as anchor tenants. The $25 million dollar mall remains the second largest in New England and the largest outside of the Boston metropolitan area as of 2026.

- 1980 – July 16: The abandoned former primary mills of William Skinner and Sons, including one that was once touted as the largest silk mill in the world, are razed by what was described by the Springfield Union as one of the largest fires in the city's history.
- 1981

- September 27: The Junior League of Holyoke opens the Children's Museum at Holyoke to a crowd of attendees in a storefront at 171 High Street.
- November 17: The federal government buys out the Holyoke and Westfield Railroad for $1.13 million dollars, with a majority going to the municipal government; at the time of its sale, 87.5% of the railroad's stock had been retained by the City.

- 1982 – Interstate 391 is completed.

- August 31: The Holyoke Millers host their last game at Mackenzie Stadium, winning 5-1 against the Reading Phillies.

- 1983 – With growing business Yankee Candle leaves its Holyoke factory, establishing its headquarters in South Deerfield.

- June 24–26: The first annual Le Festival Franco-Americain is held at the Holyoke Mall; sponsored by 27 local churches and groups as well as the French and Canadian governments, the three-day festival includes food, music, films, and traditional crafts.

- 1984 – The first annual Holyoke Puerto Rican Parade is held in South Holyoke proceeding to Springdale Park.

- January 1: Following the opening of their modern store in the Holyoke Mall and reduced foot traffic, Steiger's closes its High Street store, the chain's first standalone store building, after 84 years.

- 1986

- May 19: An American shad is caught by one Bob Thibodo in the waters below the Holyoke Dam, which is later found to be the world record holder for the largest caught, weighing in at 11 pounds and 4 ounces (567 grams).
- June 7–9: 15,000 attend the last Le Festival Franco-Americain held in Holyoke Heritage State Park. Despite modest success in Mardi Gras festivities in Chicopee in the following year, the 1986 event would be the last Le Festival hosted in Holyoke.

- 1987

- June 5: Ribbon cutting ceremonies are held for the opening of the Children's Museum at Holyoke and the Volleyball Hall of Fame at Holyoke Heritage State Park.

- July 1: Failing to resolve a labor dispute before the previous fiscal year's end, the Holyoke Street Railway ends bus service for the PVTA, unannounced. Despite calls from the Authority for the operator to renegotiate, and attempts to secure other busing contracts, the previous day marked its last day of service.

- September 27: Mountain Park closes after its last season.

- 1993

- January 21: After 144 years, a longer run than even The Boston Post, the Holyoke Transcript-Telegram abruptly ceases publication. It had been known by that name as a daily paper for 110 years.
- December 7: After an extensive grassroots fundraising effort to keep it in Holyoke, the former Mountain Park merry-go-round (PTC #80) debuts its inaugural ride at Holyoke Heritage State Park as the Holyoke Merry-Go-Round.

- 1994

- March: Steiger's closes the last of its stores following an acquisition by May Department Stores. At the time it is described as the last family-owned chain of department stores in New England. The Holyoke Mall location subsequently reopens as a Filene's.

- 1996 – July 6: A memorial plaque is dedicated at the site of the 1946 Mount Tom crash, with many small pieces of the B-17 still being found by that time.
- 1997 – Holyoke Gas & Electric launches its first fiber optics communications services.

- July 1 – As a successor to the New England Power Pool, ISO New England, the region's independent regional transmission organization, is activated, with control board and monitoring systems based in Holyoke.

- 1998 – April: Mount Tom Ski Area ceases operations after its last season.

== 21st century ==
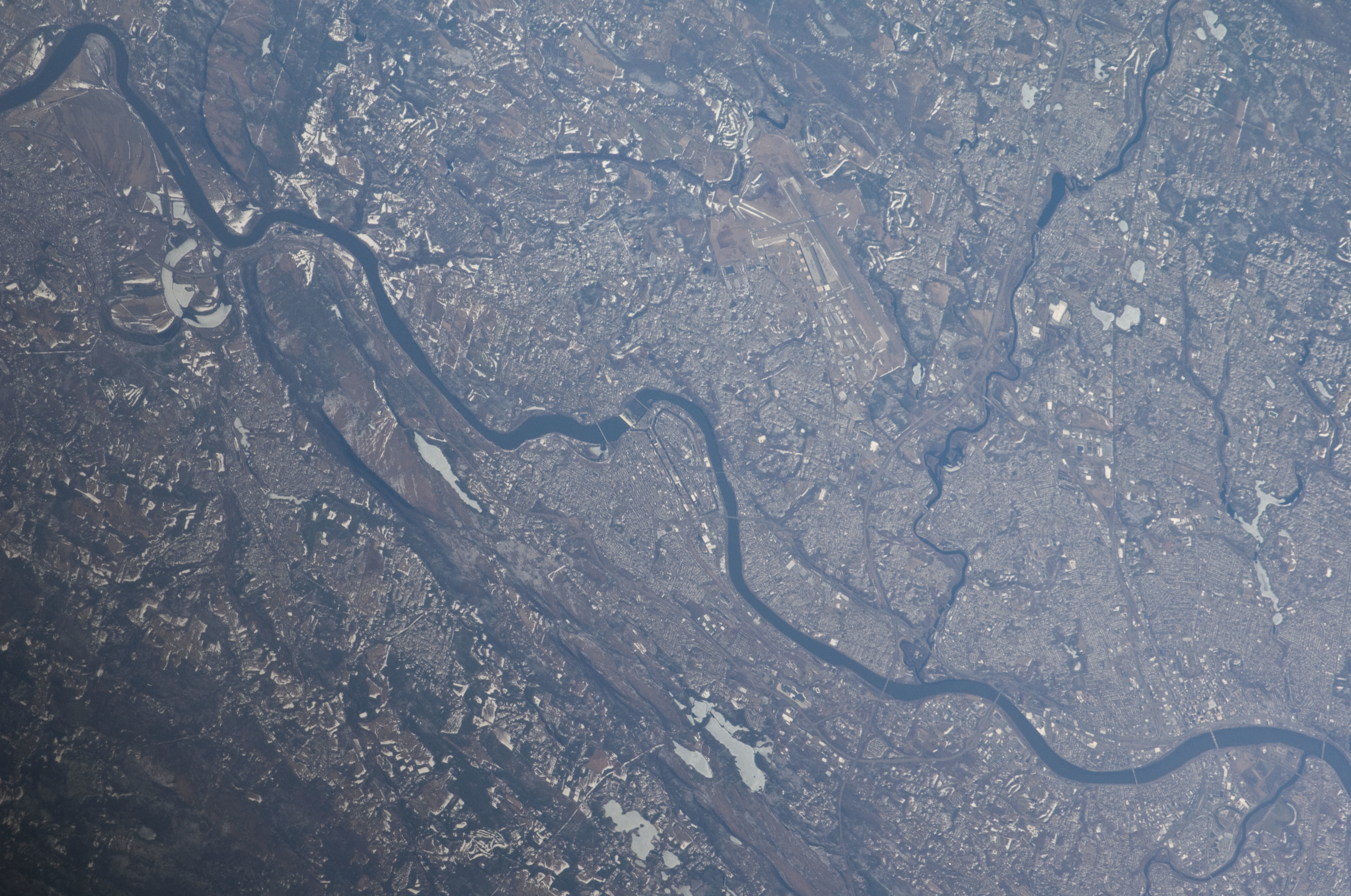
Holyoke, Chicopee, West Springfield, and Westover Air Force Base are photographed from the International Space Station, March 17, 2011

- 2001 - December 14: Holyoke Gas & Electric purchases the Dam and Canal System from the then-defunct Holyoke Water Power Company.
- 2003 - Churchill is redeveloped with the construction of the Churchill Homes, a mix of owner-occupied and housing authority single-family homes, built over the former Jackson Parkway projects.
- 2004 - Hazen Paper Company, a paper converter based in the city, lands its first job making the holographic cover of the Super Bowl program, a job it has kept every year since as of 2020, including 8 years featuring the New England Patriots.
- 2005 - April: Parsons Paper, the first and subsequently last paper mill in the city, ceases operations. (Note: Other paper-related businesses still operate in Holyoke, however Parsons Paper was the last involved in the production of paper from pulp, i.e. the last paper mill.)
- 2007 - The Holyoke Giants FCBL team departs to become the North Shore Navigators in Lynn.
- 2008 - The Valley Blue Sox NECBL baseball team debuts at Mackenzie Stadium in its inaugural season.
- 2010 - September: Citing aging infrastructure and efforts to minimize energy usage, Holyoke Gas & Electric discontinues district heating in the downtown.
- 2013 - October 28: The Holyoke Public Library reopens after 2 years of renovations and construction of a $14.5 million dollar expansion.
- 2015 - The modern Holyoke station opens, bringing passenger rail service to the city after an absence of 49 years.
- 2017 - August 8: The Valley Blue Sox win their first NECBL championship, in a series against the Ocean State Waves.
- 2018 - September 25: Holyoke Gas & Electric and French-multinational energy utility company Engie unveil Massachusetts' largest utility-scale energy storage system, used for storing solar energy for use at non-peak hours.
- 2020 - September 30: Hampden Paper, a paper converter and the last Holyoke mill still in use by its founding business, closes after 140 years.
