= Highland Park, Holyoke, Massachusetts =

Highland Park
- Neighborhood of Holyoke
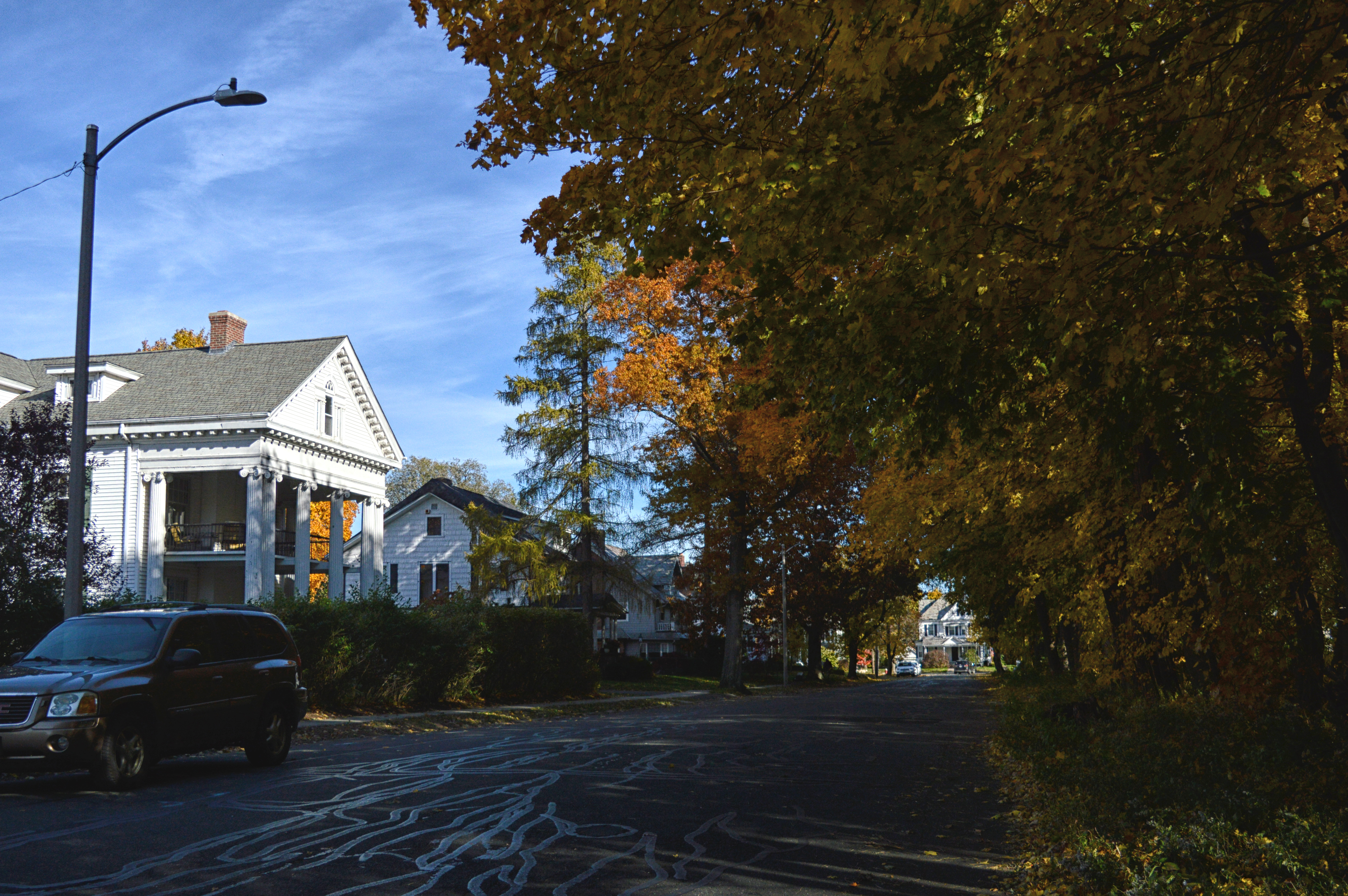
- Houses adjacent to the Highland Dingle, including that of a prominent developer of the neighborhood, Samuel O. Hoyt (left-foreground)

- Location within Holyoke Location within Massachusetts Location within the United States
- Coordinates: 42°13′20″N 72°37′13″W
- Country: United States
- State: Massachusetts
- City: Holyoke
- Wards: 7
- Precincts: 7A, 7B
- Established: February 1893

Area
  - Total: 0.85 sq mi (2.2 km^{2})
- Elevation: 230 ft (70 m)
- ZIP code: 01040
- Area code: 413
- GNIS feature ID: 609018
- MACRIS ID: HLY.F

Highland Park is a neighborhood in Holyoke, Massachusetts located to the northwest of the city center, approximately 1 mile (1.6 km) from downtown, on the banks of the Connecticut River. The neighborhood features Jones Park, originally itself known as Highland Park, which was designed by the influential Olmsted Brothers firm. The residential neighborhood was initially developed as a streetcar suburb by the Highland Park Improvement Association, which underwent several iterations between 1893 and 1930. Today the neighborhood contains numerous Victorian and early 20th century housing and about 219 acres (89 ha) of residential zoning, as well as the Edward Nelson White School.

== History ==
=== Early development plans ===
The first Highland Park Improvement Association, comprising Watson Whittlesey, W. H. Brooks, E. H. Cummings, and Ashley B. Tower gave the area its name and devised the first street plans and building lots around February 1893 as an upscale housing development. Within a year of their first meetings, ultimately their plans, including a bridge across the river decades before the Muller Bridge, would fall apart, and Whittlesey would see litigation taken against him by his associates.

The Highland Park Improvement Association dissolved shortly after the splitting of its associates, and in 1896 the land was deeded to the firm Whitcomb & Pearsons, who laid out the initial plots and tentative roads, keeping with the idea that the suburb was one for mill management and an upper-middle class. In 1909, Whitcomb would leave the project and the firm Plimpton, Pearsons, and Richards would assume the development role. That same year, Samuel Osborne Hoyt arrived in the city. A developer himself, he would work under the new firm until in 1914 he bought out the shares of his associates and made it his own contracting firm. Although the neighborhood began with a more turbulent history, within ten years Hoyt would become known as the "father of Highland Park" in the way that other streetcar suburbs like Oakdale and Springdale had their own respective developer-founder figures.

=== Community club and culture ===
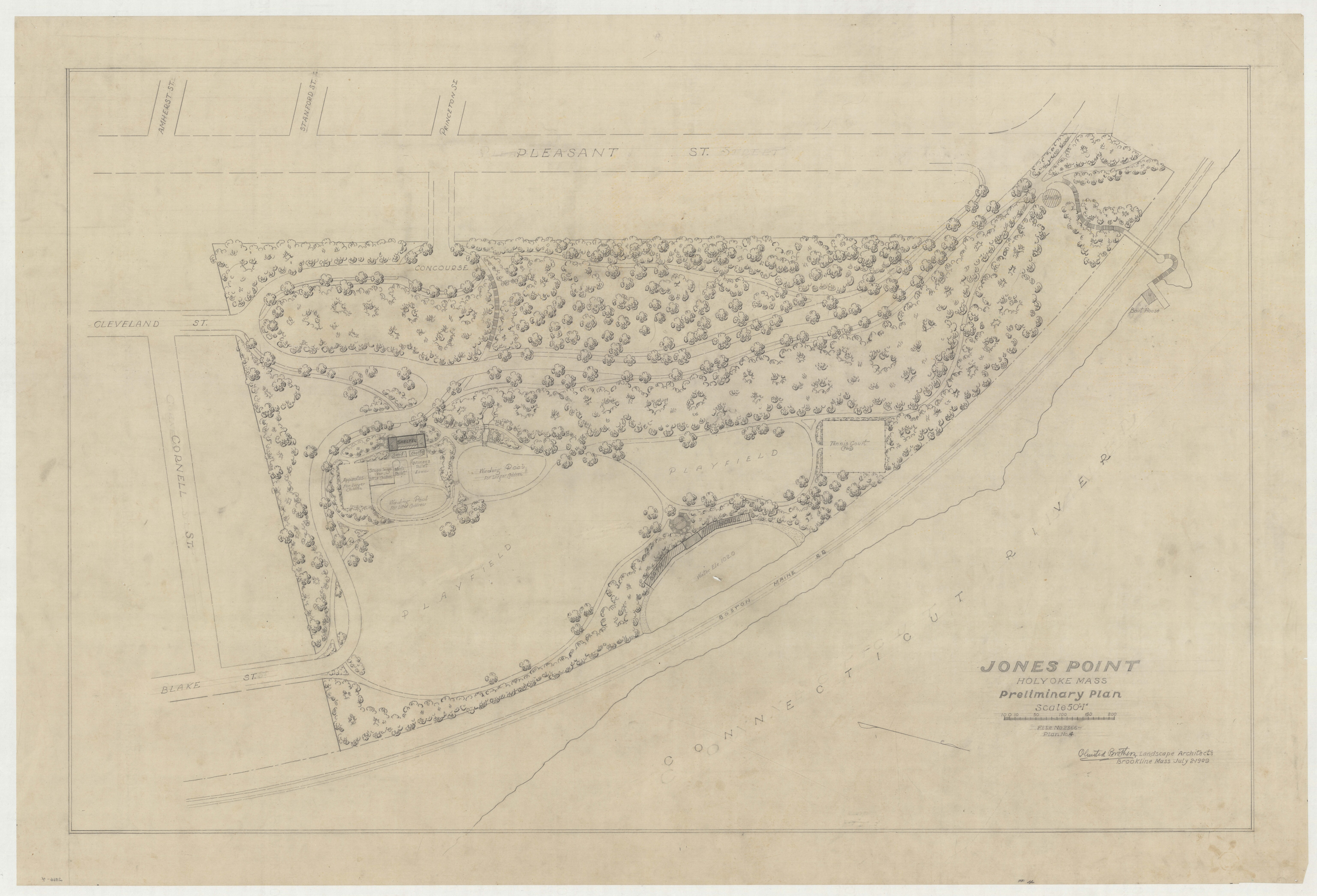
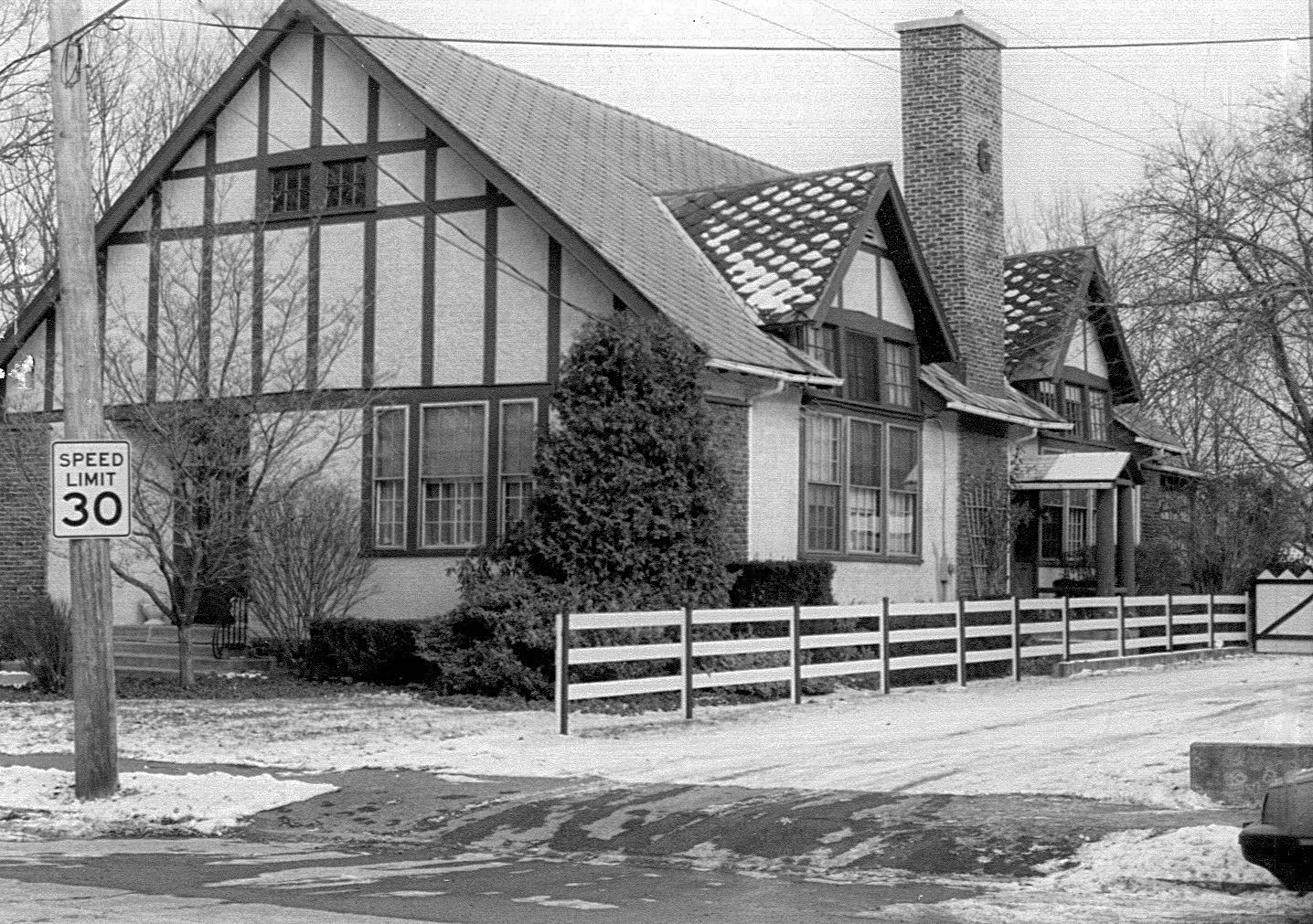
The Olmsted Brothers' 1909 plans for Jones Point Park, and the former Highland Park Community House, also known as the Lovering School, a private residence today

Highland Park would largely be shaped after 1909, as in that same year the city would purchase Smith's Ferry to the north, from Northampton, and the Olmsted Brothers were commissioned to design Jones Point Park, previously identified on maps as Highland Park or "Monte Vista". In 1909, Pleasant Street was opened as a public thoroughfare north of the dingle, as the "Ivy League" streets were gradually built out with more residences. (Note: The street scheme, from north to south, includes, the names Vassar, Radcliffe, Princeton, Stanford, Amherst, Harvard, Wellesley, Dartmouth, Yale. The name Cornell also appears on older maps in what is now the northmost section of Cleveland Street.) In 1910, the remaining undeveloped tracts to the north would host a grand exhibition for the aviation stunts of Charles F. Willard. In the history of aviation, Willard was the first barnstormer, first person to fly 3 passengers in the United States, and first person to be shot out of the sky by a bullet— that of an annoyed farmer. Willard's feats would attract a crowd of more than 7,000 for the YMCA benefit exhibition, and thousands more would view his escapades from South Hadley and boats on the Connecticut River. It was reported that 24 streetcars were dedicated to moving out the crowd at the show's conclusion. By 1911, the Holyoke Street Railway was being extended through the neighborhood along Pleasant street toward Northampton Street and Mountain Park. Although not well documented, at some point leading up to 1911, the neighborhood was also considered as a railway stop for the Boston and Maine Railroad, whose former tracks run between its homes and the Connecticut River.

In 1913 the new neighborhood's residents began to organize, hosting banquets and plays, forming the Highland Park Club. Seeking a clubhouse and amphitheater, Hoyt and his associates would donate a plot of land at 250 Pleasant Street to the club for these purposes, and before 1919 a club house in the Tudor Revival style was constructed on that spot.

Up through the mid 1920s the community house would serve as a social space for neighborhood dances, mayoral political campaigns, and even received Second Lady Grace Coolidge for a reception after her husband had become Warren G. Harding's Vice-President.

In 1923, the community house began functioning as a private school, known as the Lovering School, and was partially reconstructed after a fire that same year. It would continue to be used in this capacity until its last class graduated in 1939, and was converted to a private residence thereafter.
