= Log Pond Cove =

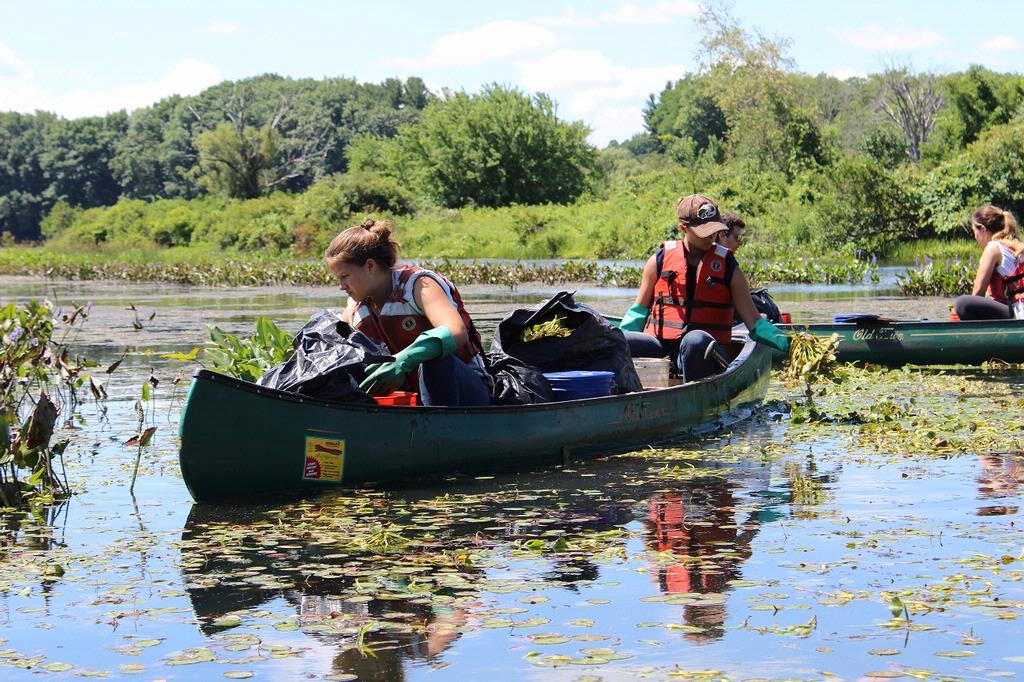
- USFWS volunteers pull water chestnut from Log Pond Cove

- Location within Holyoke Location within Massachusetts Location within the United States
- Location: Holyoke, Massachusetts
- Coordinates: 42.216001°N 72.612550°W
- Type: cove
- Primary inflows: Connecticut River
- Primary outflows: Connecticut River
- Basin countries: United States
- Surface area: 18.5 acres (7.5 ha)
- Surface elevation: 102 ft (31 m)

Log Pond Cove, previously known as Money Hole, is a former log pond and scenic wayside on the Connecticut River, about half a mile upstream from the Holyoke Dam at South Hadley Falls.

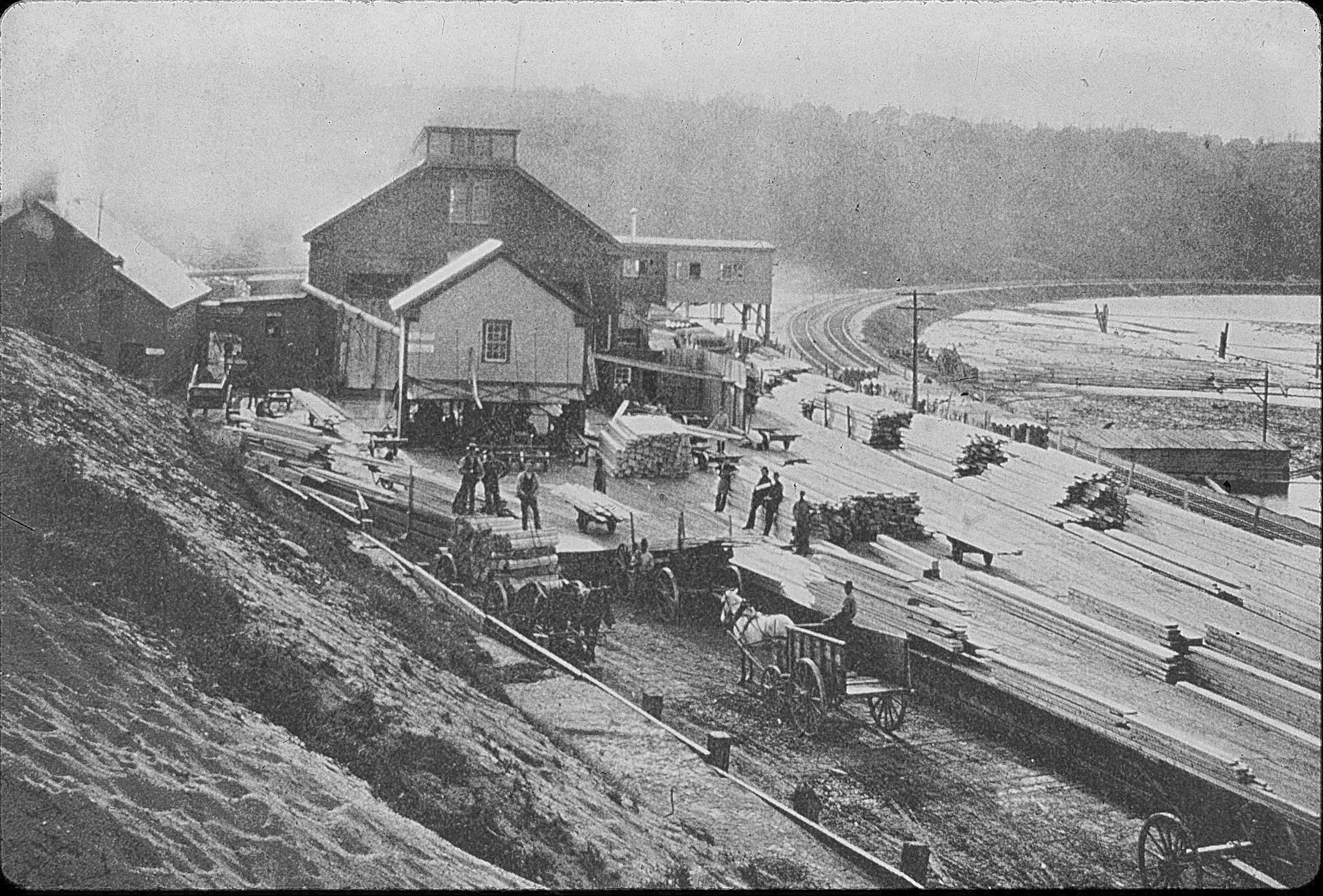
Sawmill of the Connecticut River Lumber Company on the shores of the cove, c. 1890

The 18.5-acre (75,000 m^{2}) pond was once used for ice cutting, as well as log drives from points north, diverted there in the late 19th and early 20th century. The log boom once set up there supplied contractors and the paper mills of Holyoke's industrial economy. After the last of these logging drives in 1915, silt gradually began to fill in the cove, gradually changing its river island border into a peninsula.

By the mid-20th century the water body and its immediate surroundings had been acquired by the Holyoke Water Power Company, and in 1987 the site was briefly considered for use as the site of a children's nature camp. In 1998 it was recorded as the first body of water in the Connecticut River watershed to become infested with water chestnut, an invasive species that, despite efforts by Federal and local authorities, has persisted since that time. The area was acquired by Holyoke Gas & Electric as part of the dam and canal network on December 14, 2001, and is presently managed in part by US Fish and Wildlife Service staff and volunteers as an extension of the Silvio O. Conte National Fish and Wildlife Refuge.

Today the cove is surrounded by 62 acres of undeveloped wetlands and functions as a sanctuary to many bird species, including great blue herons and several duck species.
