= William Skinner and Sons =

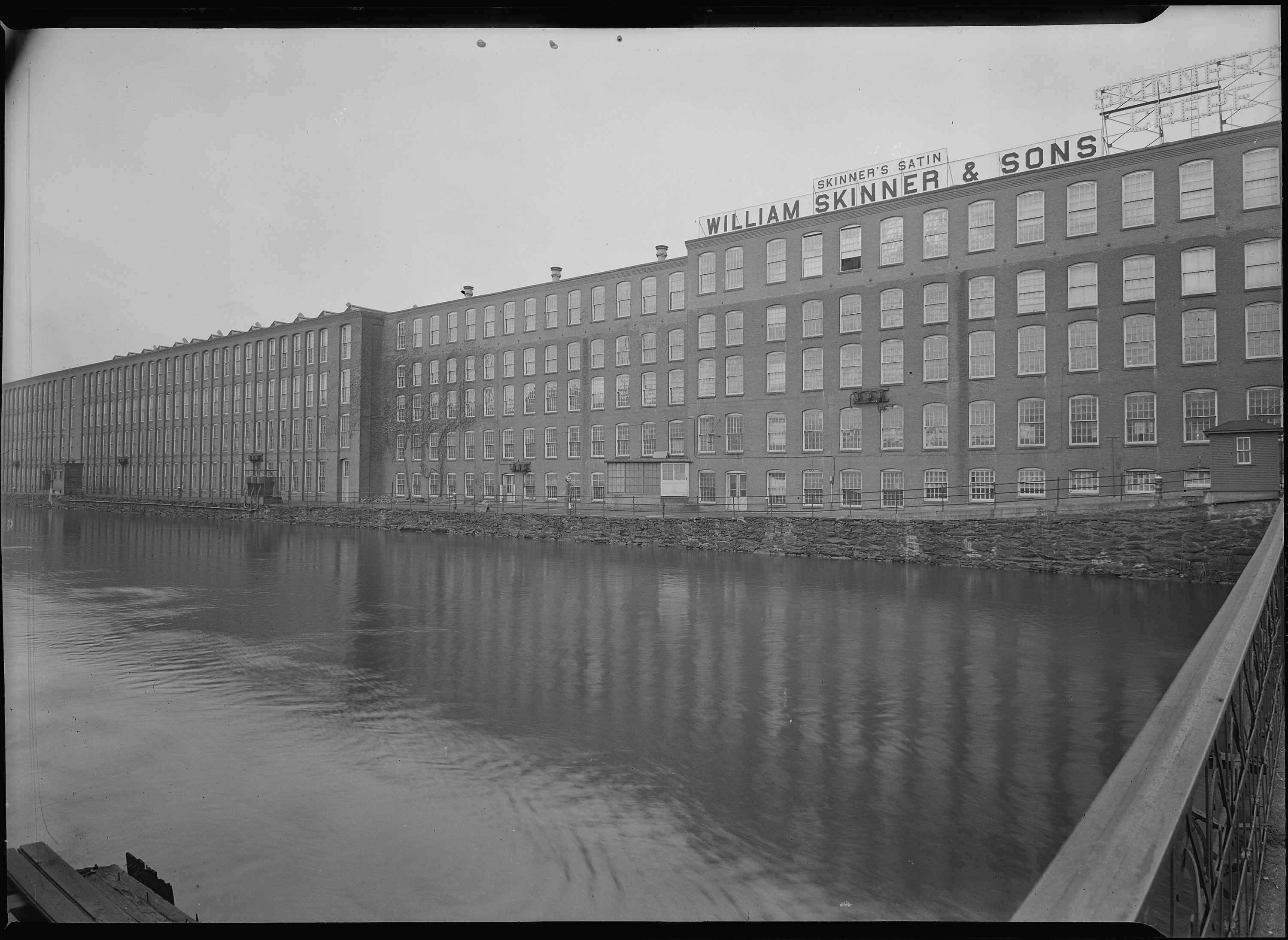
- Primary mill of William Skinner and Sons, c. 1937
- Formerly: Unquomonk Silk Mills
- Company type: Private
- Industry: Textiles; raw silk processing and satins
- Founded: 1848; 178 years ago in Haydenville, Massachusetts
- Defunct: February 1961 (purchased by Indian Head Mills); May 1963 (mills closed)
- Headquarters: Main Sales Office: 45 East 17th Street; New York, New York Mills: Holyoke, Massachusetts, United States
- Area served: Worldwide
- Key people: William Skinner (Founder)

William Skinner & Sons, generally sold under the names Skinner's Satin, Skinner's Silk, and Skinner Fabrics, was an American textile manufacturer specializing in silk products, specifically woven satins with mills in Holyoke, main sales offices in New York, and a series of nationwide satellite offices in Boston, Chicago, Philadelphia, Baltimore, Cincinnati, Cleveland, Minneapolis, Rochester, and St. Louis. Founded in 1848 by William Skinner as a partnership between himself and his brother-in-law at that time, the company was first established at a long-term location in Haydenville in 1854, as the Unquomonk Silk Mills. Following the Mill River Flood of 1874, Skinner relocated both his home and company to new facilities in Holyoke, Massachusetts, where the company would maintain its mills for the remainder of its existence. By the 20th century, Skinner & Sons had become the largest manufacturer of satins in the world, becoming one of the first to directly market to consumers in 1903, and operated out of the largest silk mill under one roof by 1912. During the 1920s and 1930s the brand was popularized with its usage in Hollywood, with silk gowns made from its satins adorned by such stars as Joan Crawford and Bette Davis on the silver screen. The company would also work extensively with the US Armed Forces during the Second World War, developing improved silk and other textile parachutes. Following a period of decline due in part to an increasingly competitive world market, the Skinner family and other shareholders sold the company for an undisclosed amount on January 26, 1961 to Indian Head Mills, which continued to operate the mills for converting rayon and other synthetics until the closure of the plant as a textile mill in 1963. In the 1970s, the Finished Goods Division of Indian Head was acquired by Springs Global, which used the Skinner name, marketing, and product line until the late 1980s; it has been defunct since that time.

== See also ==
- Wistariahurst, the Skinner family residence which was moved from Haydenville to Holyoke in 1874
- Belle Skinner
