= Oakdale, Holyoke, Massachusetts =

Oakdale
- Neighborhood of Holyoke
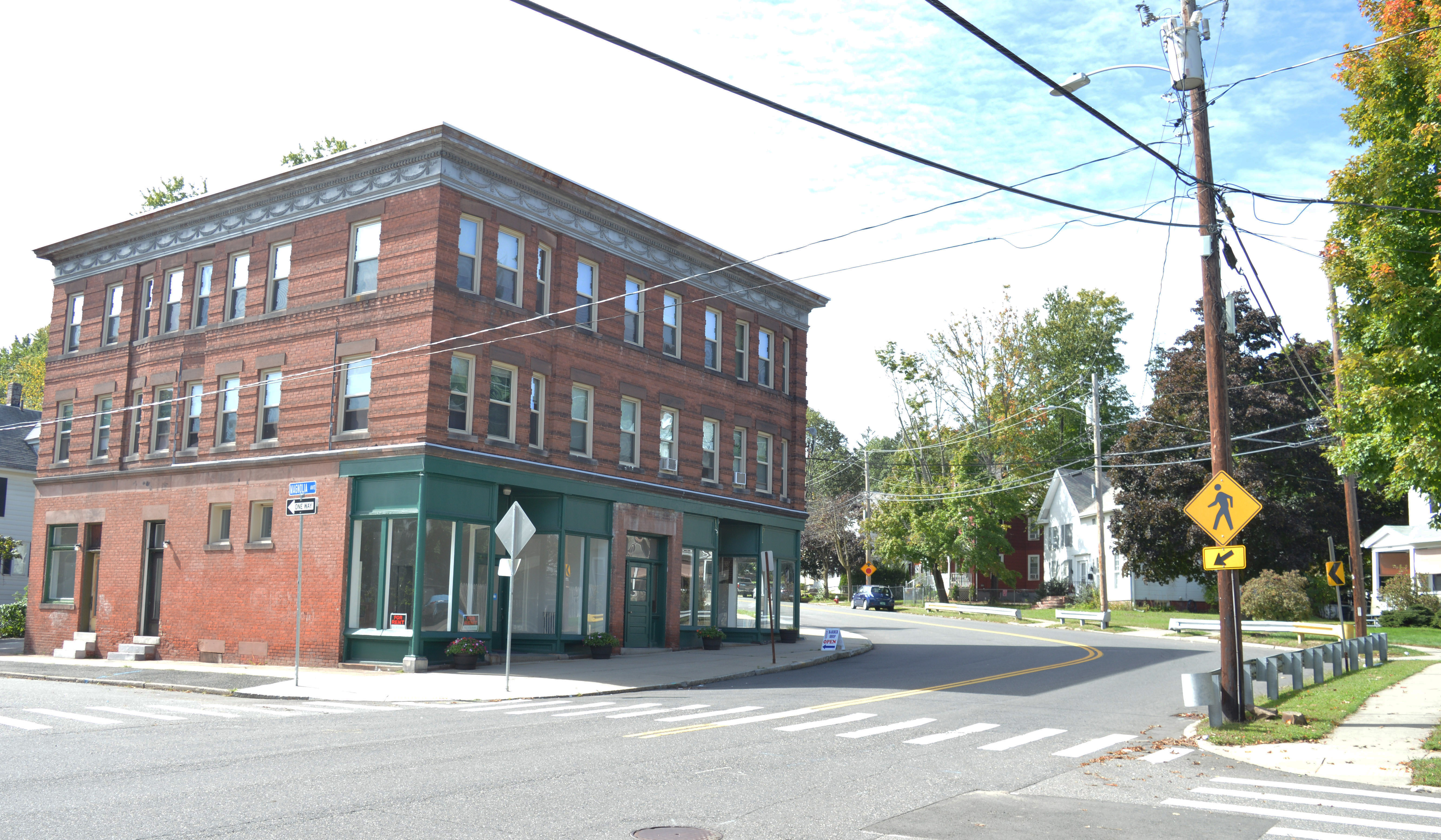
- The Oakdale Pharmacy building, a former streetcar stop and one of the neighborhood's few commercial blocks

- Location within Holyoke Location within Massachusetts Location within the United States
- Coordinates: 42°12′15.3″N 72°37′28.31″W
- Country: United States
- State: Massachusetts
- City: Holyoke
- Wards: 4, 6
- Precincts: 4A, 4B, 6A, 6B
- Established: August 1885
- Founder: Oren D. Allyn

Area
  - Total: 0.72 sq mi (1.9 km^{2})
- Elevation: 190 ft (58 m)
- ZIP code: 01040
- Area code: 413
- GNIS feature ID: 609059
- MACRIS ID: HLY.E

Oakdale is a neighborhood in Holyoke, Massachusetts located to the west of the city center, adjacent to downtown. Developed as a streetcar suburb in the late nineteenth century, today the neighborhood contains many Victorian houses, and about 460 acres (190 ha) of mixed residential and commercial zoning, as well as Forestdale Cemetery, Saint Jerome Cemetery, Rohan Park, and Holyoke Medical Center.

== History ==
Undeveloped prior to the founding of the Hadley Falls Company, Oakdale was originally shown on maps as a series of unbuilt but planned roads and extensions of the Holyoke grid plan, for more than 30 years however, these roads existed solely on paper. Following a town meeting in 1860 the Holyoke Water Power Company set aside a large tract of its lands for the establish a secular burying ground which became Forestdale Cemetery, and around this same time the St. Jerome's Cemetery was established in a tract adjacent. Much of the land at this time was otherwise owned by the Allyn family.

The son of Anderson Allyn and nephew of Samuel B. Allyn, prominent members of Holyoke in its founding days, developer Oren D. Allyn first began grading land in the area in the spring of 1885. Up until that time it had primarily been used as farmland by his father. In that same year Allyn, often referred by his initial's "O.D.", gave the neighborhood its name, Oakdale. With its sloping hills and view of the downtown, he would market it as improved housing for mill workers "of moderate means", and by the time of his death in 1929 he came to be known as the "father of Oakdale", as the neighborhood contained some 300 houses he had developed there.

One of Allyn's pastimes had been rose cultivation, his own home on the corner of Hampshire and Locust Street attracted hundreds of visitors each summer to see a reported 149 varieties, and was described by the Boston Globe at the time as a tourist attraction of the city. Indeed as a member of the board of public works, Allyn was described as an advocate of the city beautiful movement and it was noted each house he developed had enough yard-space for gardens. Often his family donated or sold trimmings to neighbors who had bought those houses, contributing to a culture of rose gardens once ubiquitous in that part of the city. For many years his wife would host an informal neighborhood social group at the gardens known as the Oakdale Society which, among other causes, raised money through luncheons and tea for children's welfare and health.

The area is today characterized by many modest late-19th and early 20th century houses, as well as a handful of estates, the most prominent of which is that of Judge John Hildreth, built in 1882, it is better known today as the former Yankee Pedlar Inn. Less conspicuously placed is "Pinehurst", a large estate surrounded by a stand of conifers, which was constructed by James H. Newton in 1909, then-president of the Chemical Paper Company, one of the last independent paper-mills of the city at that time.
