= Massachusetts Historical Commission =

Agency of the US state of Massachusetts

The Massachusetts Historical Commission (MHC) is a review board for state and federal preservation programs for the United States state of Massachusetts. It consists of 17-member panel of appointed representatives from state and private agencies and is concerned with overview of Massachusetts historic and architectural preservation efforts.

The MHC was created by the Massachusetts General Court, the state's legislature, in 1963. It is an independent division overseen by the office of the Massachusetts Secretary of the Commonwealth, who serves as the chairperson of the commission. The MHC contains technical services, grants and preservation planning divisions and is the home agency of the State Historic Preservation Officer, as well as the office of the State Archaeologist.
