= Demographics of Holyoke, Massachusetts =

Demographics and ethnic groups in Holyoke, Massachusetts

Historical population
Year	Pop.	±%
1850	3,245	—
1860	4,997	+54.0%
1870	10,733	+114.8%
1880	21,915	+104.2%
1890	35,637	+62.6%
1900	45,712	+28.3%
1910	57,730	+26.3%
1920	60,203	+4.3%
1930	56,537	−6.1%
1940	53,750	−4.9%
1950	54,661	+1.7%
1960	52,689	−3.6%
1970	50,112	−4.9%
1980	44,678	−10.8%
1990	43,704	−2.2%
2000	39,838	−8.8%
2010	39,880	+0.1%
2018	40,358	+1.2%
Source: U.S. Decennial Census

As of the 2010 United States census, there were 39,880 people, 15,361 households, and 9,329 families residing in the city of Holyoke, Massachusetts. The population density was 723.6/km^{2} (1,874/mi²). There were 16,384 housing units at an average density of 277.2/km^{2} (718.6/mi²).

The City of Holyoke has in its history, had a uniquely varied demography for its small population size. In the prime of the Second Industrial Revolution, native-born residents ranged between 18 and 38 percent, as successive waves of Colombian, Dominican, English, French-Canadian, Irish, German, Greek, Italian, Polish, Russian, Puerto Rican, Scottish and many other groups emigrated to Holyoke throughout the city's first century.

Despite being a small city, only reaching a peak estimated population of 65,286 estimated in 1916, Holyoke had a unique demography among cities in the United States, having the 3rd highest foreign born population in the 1890 census, due to its syncretic culture industrial laborers. The proportion of immigrant residents was described in 1902 by journalist for the New-York Tribune as unequaled, noting "no other city in the country has so large a foreign population in comparison to its size", as the community made early efforts to both accommodate such numerous cultures, while fostering a sense of cultural assimilation, and Americanization.

== Income ==
For the period 2013–17, the estimated median annual income for a household in the city was $37,954, and the median income for a family was $46,940. Male full-time workers had a median income of $46,888 versus $41,406 for females. The per capita income for the city was $22,625. About 24.7% of families and 28.6% of the population were below the poverty line, including 45.6% of those under age 18 and 19.8% of those age 65 or over.

As of 2017, the city had the most recipients of Supplemental Nutrition Assistance per capita of any in Massachusetts, with 37% of residents receiving such benefits. Of all ZIP codes in the Commonwealth, including those of Boston, Holyoke had the third highest total households receiving such assistance, with the highest per capita of any of the state's 351 municipalities, representing 54% of all households. A 2020 study by the Urban Institute found Holyoke to be the least socioeconomically inclusive city in New England for minorities, despite them representing the largest group demographically. The report found between 2010 and 2015 the racial educational attainment gap narrowed by 30%, however homeownership declined slightly, and the proportion of working poor marginally increased.

== Precolonial settlement ==
In the area around Holyoke and South Hadley Falls there were a number of tribes of native tribes, all belonging to the Algonquian peoples. Though records are sparse and incomplete, the area was settled by the Pocomtuc, sometimes referred to as the Agawam or Nonotuck. Little remains marking the legacy of the Connecticut Valley's indigenous population in Holyoke. One of the few notable examples was found during an early excavation for the canal system in 1847, when four skeletons were found by workmen in a makeshift tomb, all in the sitting position, facing eastward, with a mortar and pestle beside them, and a hollowed out underground chamber surrounding them. A number of burial sites would also be unearthed during the development of Depot Hill, and for a time DeRoy Park was known as Canonchet Park, as at least one such grave was found there. Other sites were discovered across the river where Bachelor Brook met the Connecticut, and in the early 20th century those who discovered those sites posited that artifacts might exist on the shores by Highland Park. Ultimately the presence of the tribes to the west of Springfield and Hadley would keep many of the earliest pioneers from permanently settling in the 17th century.

In the early 20th century, many Amerindian artifacts were uncovered and exhibited by local architect W. J. Howes, who would lead lectures on tribe archaeology at the Holyoke Scientific Association and was a recipient of many gifts of pottery and arrowheads found by people in the valley.

== Ethnography ==
Populations of first generation foreign-born nationals residing in Holyoke during the Second Industrial Revolution

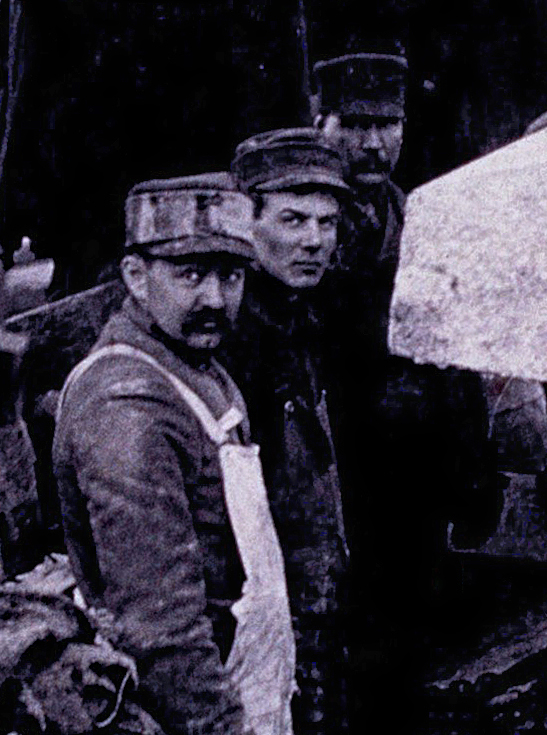
Workers standing beside the last stone laid in the Holyoke Dam, January 5, 1900

Holyoke had witnessed such staggering growth from its founding until about 1900, that by 1902 the New-York Tribune reported the city contained 80% either first or second-generation immigrants, claiming that when adding the latter, no other city in the United States had as many residents per capita of foreign origin. At the time of writing, early efforts of Americanization had begun, with the city being described both by the Tribune and the Commonwealth's offices as being at the forefront of teaching immigrant groups English as a second language, as well as history, and civics. The groups involved in these efforts to foster a common Holyoke community amongst the different ethnic groups included private companies like William Skinner & Sons, with the Skinners introducing the Skinner Coffeehouse meeting hall that year, as well as the local YMCA, the Chamber of Commerce, and Holyoke Public Schools, all providing classes, events, and other social gathering opportunities.

Even as the Second Industrial Revolution drew to a close, the successive waves of immigration to the city seeking jobs and inexpensive housing continued. Originally settled by Yankee English, Irish Protestants and a few freemen, the first wave of immigration was largely Irish Catholics with a smaller demographic of Scots, followed by waves French and French-Canadians, then English and English Canadians, Germans, Italians, Poles, Jews, and smaller groups of Chinese and Greeks. From the mid-20th century onward came a large wave of Puerto Rican denizens, and by the end of the 20th century smaller groups of Colombians, Dominicans, and Mexicans had settled in the city. Because of these large immigration movements throughout the decades, as well as changes in American culture at large, and the many contributions of Holyoke to American culture such as volleyball, Holyoke has throughout its history had a varying syncretic culture as the result of disparate groups and traditions.

=== African-Americans ===
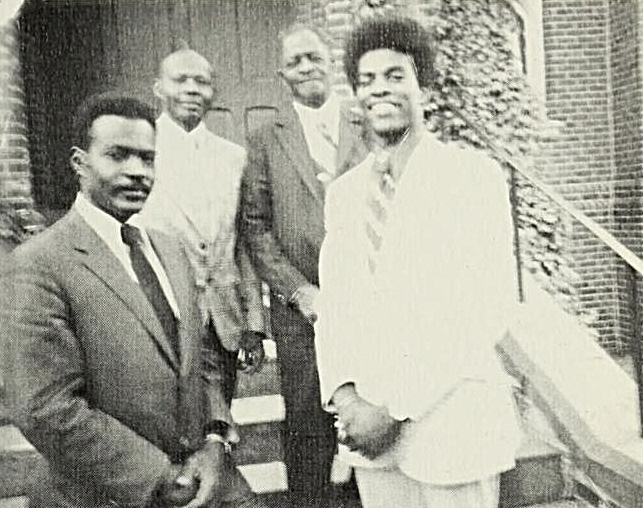
Deacons of Bethlehem Baptist Church, 1973, (left to right) Mansfield Stuckey, Willis C. Wilson, Harold Patton, Larry Rucks

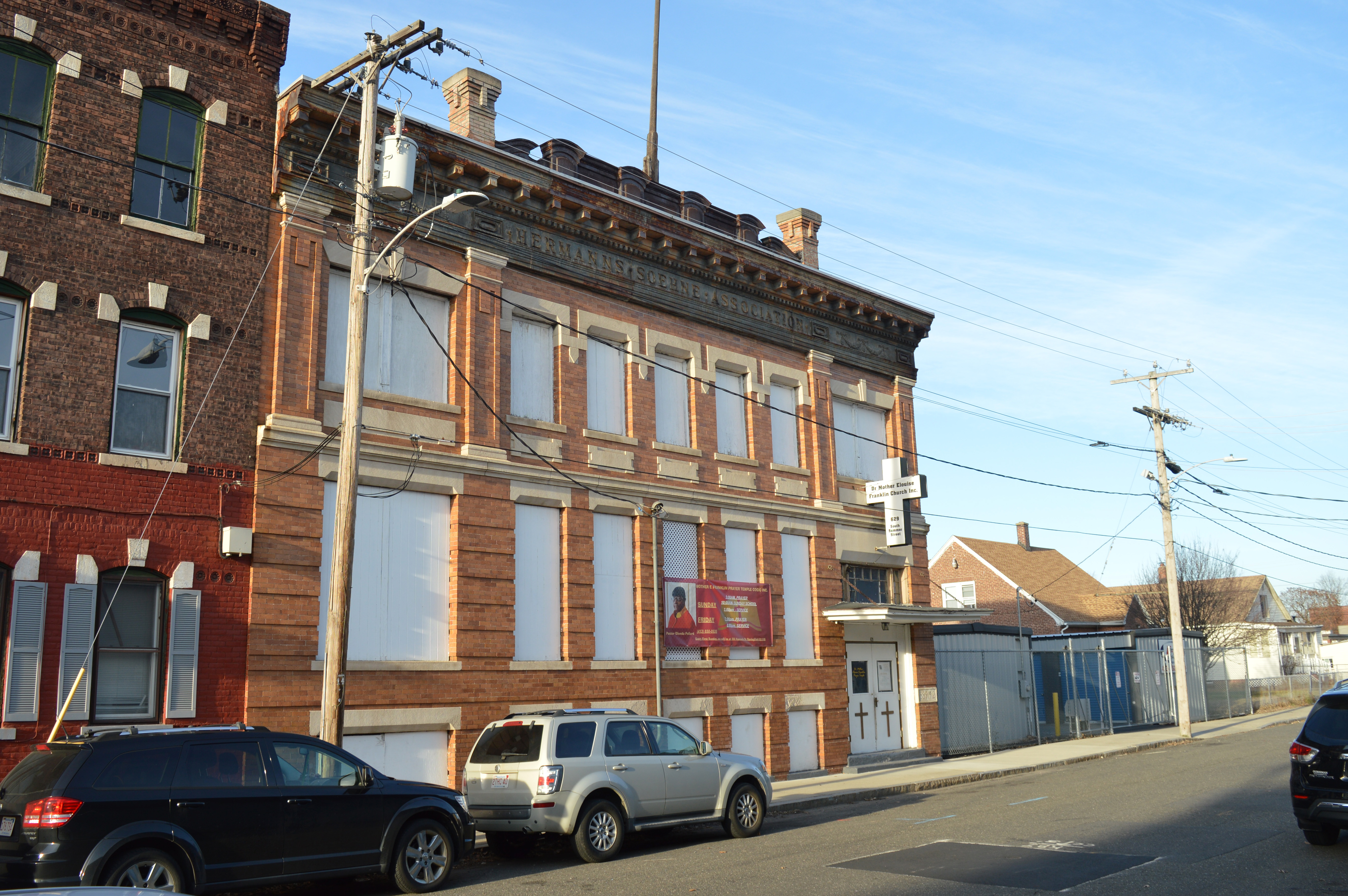
The Mother Elouise Franklin Church today, in South Holyoke; originally used as the meeting hall of the Sons of Hermann, it was renovated by the parishioners in 1973, an early example of reuse and revitalization in South Holyoke

As of 2010, there were 1,867 African-American or black residents living in Holyoke, and an estimated 11,539 according to the 2017 American Community Survey. Black families have resided in Holyoke since its days as Ireland Parish, with one of the earliest records being the marriage of Bushman Fuller and his bride Miss Flora Parry, on February 7, 1778. Fuller, a freeman who had previously been a slave to one Joseph Ely of West Springfield, purchased his wife's freedom for $100 at the time, or $1 per bushel of wheat. The two would become part of a small but active black community that resided to the west of what is today called Elmwood in modern-day the Jarvis Avenue/Homestead Avenue neighborhoods. When the Congregationalists joined the Baptists in the Baptist Village meetinghouse, according to an 1890 account of the city's church history, members of the black community "were cordially received and were treated with great kindness by both the pastor and people". Though segregated, a section of the pews was set aside for them at the front rows by the pulpit, in the southwest section of the sanctuary. Flora Fuller would go on become a prominent member of the Baptist Village community, serving as a village nurse to its earliest residents, providing aid to the sick. Flora Fuller's daughter, Clorilla, would marry a William Jarvis, of the family for whom Jarvis Avenue is so-named.

The community remained relatively small but other families would arrive to the city after its founding as Holyoke, seeking work in the mills and factories there. By 1926 a survey of churchgoers showed 67 black Protestant parishioners, and an African Methodist Episcopal Church had opened in The Flats. This church, affiliated with a counterpart in Springfield, would be defunct before World War II. In 1957, the New Hope Church of God in Christ parish was established under the leadership of Bishop C. W. Franklin and his wife Mother Elouise Franklin. Moving from a storefront to a permanent home in the former Hermannshalle in 1973, the church remains extant in South Holyoke today, christened as the Mother Elouise Franklin Church. For several years the black Bethlehem Baptist Church had been meeting in the old Lutheran Church building in South Holyoke after the Lutheran move to their current church on Northampton Street in 1955. Over the next several years the Baptist Church would take part in dialogue with the Greater Holyoke Council of Churches, as part of a survey and broader panel for public discussion of the issues facing black Holyoke families. In 1961 the city's public schools would accept 3 black students, along with 6 others attending Springfield and West Springfield, after Prince Edward County, Virginia closed its public schools to avoid implementing court-mandated integration. This action led to 1,700 black children being unable to attend private white schools and through a nationwide effort by the American Friends Service Committee, working with the local Greater Holyoke Council of Churches, funds were raised for the schooling of these additional three pupils at Holyoke Public Schools. When the Reformed Church on Sargeant Street merged with the other Congregational churches in 1963, their former building, also previously used by German immigrants, became the home of the Bethlehem Baptist Church, which resides there today.

External audio
- History Of Black Holyoke, with Erica Slocumb, October 13, 2019, on Occupy the Airwaves of WXOJ-LP

The 1960 US Census would record 148 black households, representing in total about 1% or about 500 individuals of the 52,689 population at that time. Within a decade two of the school district's own native sons went on to become household names. The first, Jim Jennings, would go on from Holyoke High School to play for Rutgers University as a running back in the early 1970s. The other, Kenny Gamble would go on from being a running back for Colgate University to being the inaugural recipient of the Walter Payton Award, playing for the Kansas City Chiefs thereafter for four seasons. Gamble would later be inducted into the College Football Hall of Fame in 2002.

In 1983, after discussion between Mayor Proulx and the NAACP, the City agreed to set up a Minority Action Committee, including the city's affirmative action officer, Victor Douglas, and the NAACP-appointed Louis Owens, an electrician and outspoken candidate for city council, who agreed with the mission of the body as a means to lobby for improved housing and economic opportunities for the city's black and Hispanic community.

In 2018 a doctoral candidate in UMass Amherst's Afro-American Studies Department, Erika Slocumb, began documenting and archiving accounts of black Holyoke history, with support from the Wistariahurst Museum and funding by Mass Humanities. Slocumb's work, Reliquary of Blackness: Documenting Black History in Holyoke was among those selected to be featured in the National Council on Public History's 2020 national conference.

Though not necessarily identified with the handle African-American, generally used to refer to the descendants of former enslaved black peoples, additionally in single-ancestry responses in 2017, 323 people identified as Subsaharan Africans, including 100 Zimbabweans, 93 Liberians, and 44 Kenyans, and 148 as non-Hispanic West Indians, including 88 Jamaicans and 44 Haitians.

=== Chinese ===
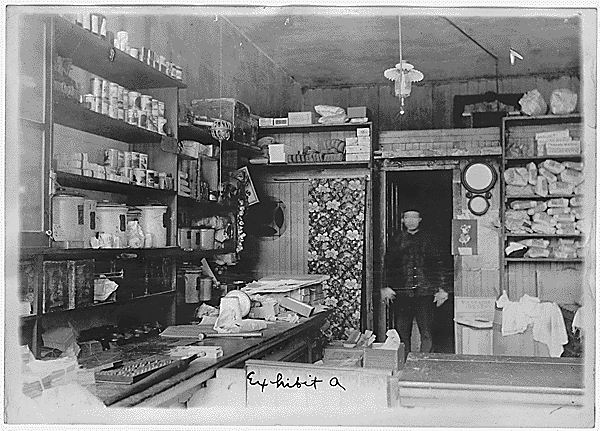
A High Street laundry shop owned and operated by Mr. Lee Wong Hing, (Note: Note all names used in early 20th century Western sources predate pinyin.) a Chinese American merchant, c. 1904, from a review case by Federal Government, in the era of the Chinese Exclusion Act

External image
- The Orient Restaurant, c. 1935, it was drafted in 1919 by George P. B. Alderman under commission by owner Joe Fun

As of the 2010 Census, there were 79 residents of Chinese heritage living in Holyoke (Chinese: 霍利奥克), and an estimated 119 according to the 2017 American Community Survey. Chinese Americans have resided in small numbers in Holyoke, as well as its neighboring cities of Springfield and Westfield, since the mid 19th century. Though only a demographic of dozens, their early presence represented two classes, a working class operating laundromats and restaurants, and an academic demographic attending Holyoke High School through the Chinese Educational Mission and similar exchanges from 1872 through 1911; a number of alumni would become prominent officials, overseeing reforms in the Qing dynasty and the Republic of China thereafter.

In the 1880 US Census, 4 Chinese residents were recorded as residing in the city. In the decade following the Chinese Exclusion Act of 1882, other families would move to the area and by 1893 a letter to the editor of New York's Irish American reported the population had grown to 20 people. These Chinese would form tong chapters and other institutions in time, and integrated early on. Reflecting social attitudes, Holyoke would make national news in 1888 when a Holyoke laundryman, one Sam Kee, married a white mill worker, Katie Jones, leaving to be wed in New York. The history of Holyoke and Springfield's Chinese would largely be male-dominated, due to the immigration restrictions imposed on them, by 1925 there would be a ratio of 5.7 Chinese American men to every 1 woman of Chinese descent in the United States. In a Hampden County history by Clifton Johnson, the earliest Chinese community was described as transitory, which may have been in part a reflection of the Federal government's scrutiny of Chinese merchants before the passage of the Chinese Exclusion Repeal Act. Despite a presence spanning four decades by that time, it was not until 1921 that the first Chinese funeral rites were recorded in Holyoke by The Republican. Though not Holyoke specifically, a 1942 account of Westfield's last first-generation Chinese laundromat closing would describe that respective towns peak in Chinese laundromats being about 1911 to 1918.

Although limited in scale by the lack of a sizable population, Holyoke and Springfield would briefly see the violence of the Tong Wars. A prolonged rivalry between the On Leong and Hip Sing tongs, present in Holyoke and Springfield, came to a head on December 7, 1924 when a drive-by shooting injured two members of the On Leong tong at a Springfield laundromat. Although no suspect was convicted, Holyoke's Joe Fun, who'd opened "The Orient" restaurant five year's earlier faced scrutiny as the driver and a reported member of the Hip Sing, barricading himself in his business across from City Hall for days with his lawyers. Later denying his tong membership, Fun approached the Holyoke Police in 1927, seeking protection, and it was reported police were watching a laundromat on Appleton Street at that time, hoping to prevent additional skirmishes.

The other class of Chinese residents who resided in Holyoke were the sons of officials in Qing China, of whom about a dozen were accepted from 1872 to 1881 at Holyoke High School, one of numerous other public schools in the Commonwealth to host such students. The exchange program left such an impression on its alumni, some would return to the city as senior officials of the Qing government. These included a Mr. Shung Kih Ting, who visited to Holyoke in 1909 while acting deputy commissioner of the Chinese Maritime Customs Service, and Mr. Chow Wan Tang, then general manager of the Imperial Chinese Telegraph Administration. Although the Chinese Educational Mission had ended by this time, in 1908 Chow Wan Tang would leave his son, Clarence Chow, to study as he had once, at Holyoke High School. Clarence was hosted by the same family who had hosted his father, the Kagwins on Beech Street, a working-class family in the employ of the city's Ford Augur Company. Clarence went on to become an acclaimed school athlete at Holyoke High, before attending Yale. Returning to China in the years after college, Chow would spend the rest of his time in the service of the Chinese government across three administrations, enduring political turmoil of the Chinese Civil War. Arriving in Holyoke as a Qing government exchange student, he would serve as a diplomat for the Republic, and later wrote his classmates in 1961, to say that he was serving as a teacher in Beijing during Mao's administration.

Aside from exchange students the city would host one other prominent official. In May 1906, Chen Jintao, (Note: Referred to by contemporary Western documents in the Wade–Giles Romanization as "Ch’en Chin-t’ao" or "Chintao Chen".) the eventual founder of the Bank of China, also regarded as China's first foreign scholar, was sent to the city on assignment to study its budding paper-making industry and infrastructure, reporting back to the Chinese government after a month of observation. He would be received not only by mill owners but the city government itself, including city engineer James Tighe who would show him the infrastructure of the Holyoke Reservoir System. Chen, possibly a member of the Tongmenghui, would go on to serve numerous important roles in both the Qing and Republic of China governments, including Acting Minister of Foreign Affairs for the latter.

=== Colombians ===
As of the 2010 Census, there were 202 residents of Colombian heritage living in Holyoke, and an estimated 204 according to the 2017 American Community Survey. Though not residents of the city, one of the earliest exchanges between Holyoke and Colombian culture came on October 11, 1889, during the first Pan-American Conference, where the officials of 14 Central and South American countries were received in Springfield and subsequently Holyoke, traveling by rail. Among them was Carlos Martínez Silva, one of the framers of Colombia's 1886 Constitution which established it as the Republic of Colombia. Nearly a century later, in the late 1960s, many of the earliest Colombian residents would settle in Holyoke, as laborers in the remaining factories during a labor shortage from the Vietnam War.

=== Dominicans ===
As of the 2010 Census, there were 349 residents of Dominican heritage living in Holyoke, and an estimated 5,080 according to the 2017 American Community Survey, comprising the second largest Hispanic or Latino group in the city. In the early 1990s, dozens of Dominican families arrived in Holyoke, some following a similar path as Puerto Rican residents, arriving from New York to Springfield, others directly from the Dominican Republic. Many would open shops such as bodegas and salons in the city.

=== English ===
External image
- Farr Alpaca vs. Clan McLaren, Chaloux Cup, Thanksgiving Day c.1910, an example of the soccer club which ultimately led to a professional team, the Falcos, from the collection of Harry Craven at Highland Hardware, via SoccerHistoryUS

As of the 2010 5-year American Community Survey, there were 949 residents of English heritage living in Holyoke, and an estimated 305 according to the 2017 American Community Survey, as well as 53 in that survey who identified by the response "British". Holyoke's English would comprise two groups, American "Yankee English", descendants of the first settlers of Massachusetts Bay Colony and soldiers of the American Revolution, including early figures like Mayors William B. C. Pearsons, Roswell P. Crafts, and William Whiting. The latter group would be the later arrivals of Holyoke, including William Skinner of Skinner Silk, and American impressionist painter William Chadwick, both 19th century arrivals of English immigrant families. Many of the cities later arrivals would also be hires for the Farr Alpaca Company, of which about half of its initial 200 workers came directly from Canada or England, and was described as "an English mill". It was through the fanfare of these English and Anglo-Canadian arrivals that the city would briefly host one of the pioneer professional American soccer teams, the Holyoke Falcos.

=== French and French-Canadians ===
As of the 2010 5-year American Community Survey, there were 1,126 residents of French heritage living in Holyoke, 695 residents of French-Canadian heritage, and no residents of Acadian or Cajun heritage. In the 2017 American Community Survey, it was recorded there were 721 residents of French heritage, 712 residents of French-Canadian heritage, and 13 residents of Acadian or Cajun heritage. At the beginning of the 20th century Holyoke was a hub for Franco-American culture, having one of the largest populations of French or French-Canadian foreign nationals, exceeding the populations of Chicago and New Orleans in 1913.

=== Germans ===
As of the 2010 5-year American Community Survey, there were 578 residents of German heritage living in Holyoke, and in the 2017 American Community Survey, it was recorded there were 276 residents of German heritage. During the 19th century a small German immigrant colony was established around the Germania Woolen Mills of South Holyoke, which had the highest German per capita population of New England by 1875.

=== Greeks ===
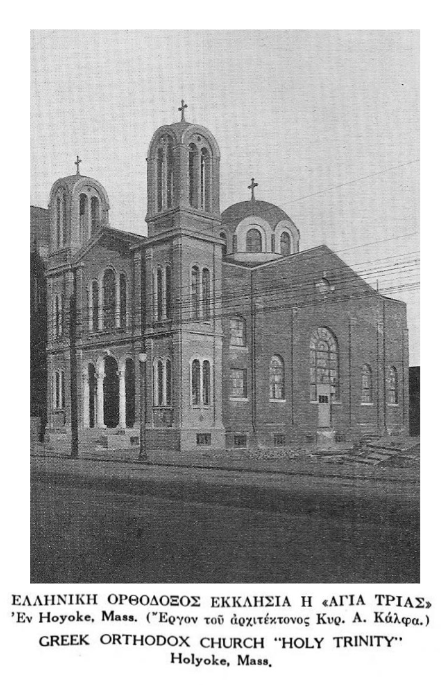
The Holy Trinity Greek Church in South Holyoke, as it appeared shortly after its dedication, from the 1918 history book Hellenism in America

As of the 2010 5-year American Community Survey, there were 113 residents of Greek heritage living in Holyoke (Greek: Χόλιοκ), and an estimated 37 according to the 2017 American Community Survey.

Although a large Greek community would characterize Springfield more than Holyoke in size and cultural institutions, at the turn of the 20th century the Paper City would see the arrival of a Greek families seeking work in the area's mills and factories. The first arrivals were largely individual workers in the local textile factories, with the first family, that of George Demos, arriving in 1904. By 1905 there were reportedly 25 Greek expatriates living in the Paper City.

Holyoke's community was largely built around the Orthodox Church, even prior to the construction of its permanent home. In the earliest years the community was hosted in the grand hall of the Monument National Canadien Français, at which the first Greek Orthodox church services were held by Reverend Papaleloudas, as well as celebrations of the Greek Revolution, and meetings of the Pan-Hellenic Union of America, which had 20,000 members in 1913 and maintained a branch in Holyoke. During the Second Balkan War in 1913, the organization would receive letters from those of the community fighting for their country overseas, with at least 40 such men going overseas for the effort against Bulgaria.

On May 19, 1916, the Holy Trinity Church was officially issued a charter of parish by the Secretary of the Commonwealth, and the process began in the construction of a permanent church edifice. The parish would hire Greek-American architect Kyriakos Kalfas of New York City, who would base the design on the Church of the Pantokrator in Patras, but decided to use welded steel for the edifice's domes rather than traditional wood and tile-based building methods, seeking to prevent ice and snow from compromising the structure. The church was dedicated on November 18, 1917.

By 1920 there were a reported 400 members of the Greek community residing in Holyoke, and although they were united by the Greek Hellenic identity and independence of their nation, rifts existed in the earliest days between those supporting Eleftherios Venizelos and the Greek monarchy, with some tensions and confrontations between the two factions at meetings during the early 1920s. During one 1920 meeting held at City Hall, it was reported that the City Marshall (a predecessor of the Chief of Police) withdrew support and suggested the meeting of 1,200 be called off due to reported tensions between the two factions. Though the meeting was still held with a police presence, a week later one of its speakers, a Greek diplomat, Elias Panas, would be attacked by members of an opposing faction while in Springfield. Later in November of that same year, members of the Venizelos faction, Holyoke's Greek Liberal Society, would telegram President Wilson, decrying a piece that had been published by a New York paper calling for a new referendum for a ruler of Greece, arguing it was done so by royalists.

By 1920, the Greek language had briefly found a home in the city's press, with the establishment of the New England Greek-American Publishing Company in South Holyoke at 419 Main Street, by one Christ Bress. Mr. Bress would also found the fraternal St. Andrews Club in the city, and later worked as a writer for the first successful Greek language daily, the Atlantis in New York City, shortly before his death in 1929. Unfortunately little information remains on the duration of his paper in Holyoke, other than his involvement in its publication had ceased by that time.

During the Iouliana of 1965, through the efforts of the Holy Trinity Greek Church as well as the First Baptist Church and 3 other Baptist congregations, two families were received from Greece to make their new home in Holyoke. On March 28, 2022, Mayor Garcia honored the community with a raising of the flag of Greece and official proclamation celebrating the independence of Greece from the Ottoman Empire in 1821.

=== Irish ===
As of the 2010 5-year American Community Survey, there were 2740 residents of Irish heritage living in Holyoke, and in the 2017 American Community Survey, it was recorded there were 1882 residents of Irish heritage. From the beginning of Holyoke's founding, Irish immigrants have been associated with the founding of the City; prior to its formal establishment the area today encompassing Holyoke, the Third Parish of West Springfield, was known as "Ireland", or "Ireland Parish".

=== Italians ===
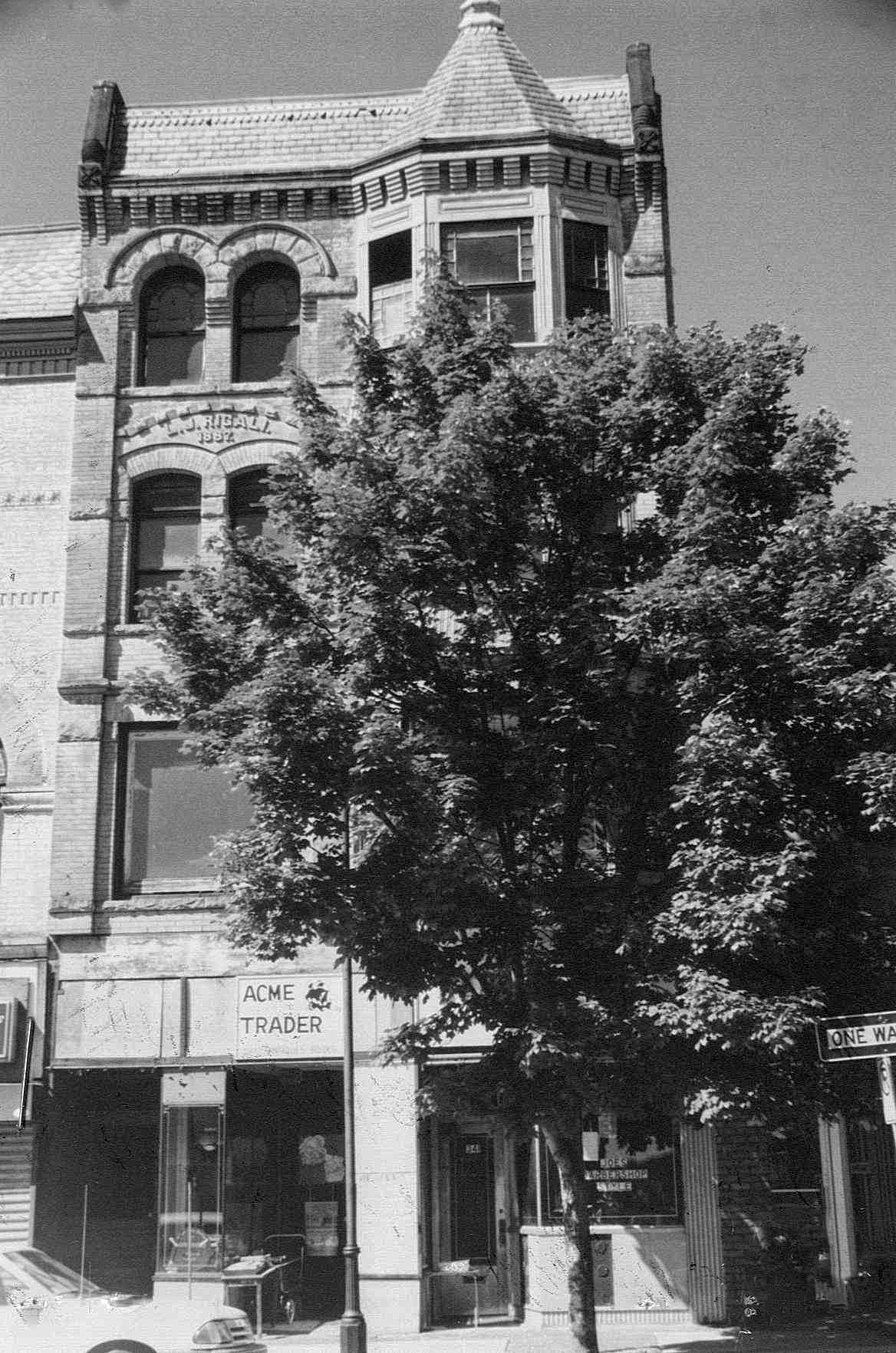
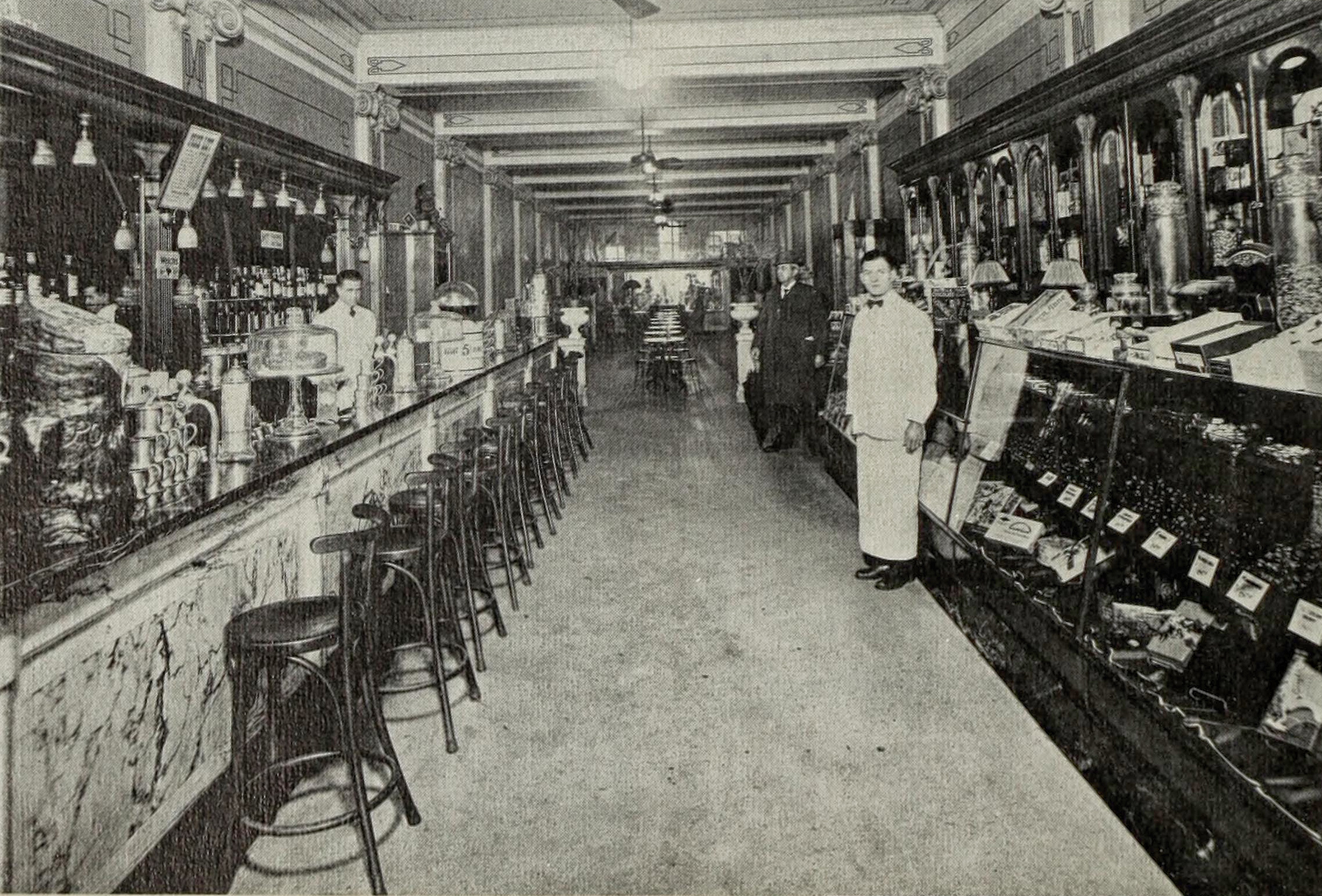
Rigali Block at 341-343 High Street; built by fruit store owner Louis Regali in 1887, and designed by George P. B. Alderman, it was later sold to Caesar Equi who operated his store there in the 20th century (right). Equi's would be the first such store to operate in the city with its own soda fountain, selling its own ice cream

As of the 2010 5-year American Community Survey, there were 565 residents of Italian heritage living in Holyoke, and an estimated 320 according to the 2017 American Community Survey. Italians, having a greater presence toward Springfield, would arrive in Holyoke in the 1880s, with the earliest record of an Italian family being in 1884 when a Charles Marano married a May O'Connor. Many of the city's earliest arrivals would establish confectionery stores and produce markets in business districts along High and Main Streets. In addition to proprietors, many of these early arrivals included tradesmen such as stone-cutters, carpenters, tailors, and barbers. By 1887, one Louis J. Rigali, a real estate broker, would construct a small Romanesque block on High Street, still extant today.

While the Italian community would remain scattered throughout the city, for a brief time a section of downtown by present-day Nick Cosmos Way (then known as "Bond Street") would be characterized by a number of Italian shops and family residences, with the first market dedicated to Italian specialties like olive oil, cheeses, and cold-cuts, opening at the corner of Bond and Essex in 1918. A number of other markets and produce stores founded by Italian immigrants would remain fixtures for more than 50 years, including names like Luchini's, Rigali Brothers, Mazzolini Brothers, and Magri's, the latter of which remains extant in Chicopee. Another example of a long-running Holyoke Italian business was D'Addario's Camera Shop, operated by brothers Vincent and Ray D'Addario, the latter of whom would go on to be chief photographer of the Nuremberg trials. One of the longest-running Italian institutions in the city would be the Italian Progressive Society. Founded in 1900, as a benefit society, the group would host numerous dances, dinners, and outings, buying a plot of land adjacent to Hampton Ponds. Similar to the German Turners' Camp Jahn, the Italian Grove would serve as a family recreation venue for membership in the summers. In 1972 the Society reorganized, incorporated again in South Hadley in 1978, and gradually became defunct by the 21st century.

=== Mexicans ===
As of the 2010 Census, there were 167 residents of Mexican heritage living in Holyoke, and an estimated 329 according to the 2017 American Community Survey. While much of Holyoke's Mexican community arrived in the latter part of the 20th and early 21st centuries, the city had some earlier exchanges of Mexican culture. In the late 1890s, one of the musical acts performing at Mountain Park were the Mexican Troubadours, a group of musicians from Mexico wearing traditional charros, who would play the harp, ocarina, mandolin, and "a sort of exaggerated autoharp" there, as well as regularly at Springfield's Forest Park. The Mexican government would also send delegations to Holyoke on two occasions. In 1889, during the cross-country tour of the Pan-American Conference, when the city received Adolfo Mujica y Sáyago, a diplomat who would later serve as the Consul General of Mexico to Spain. In 1950, representatives from Mexico, among more than a dozen other countries, were on-hand during the demonstration of the first newsprint commercially produced using bagasse at the mills of the Chemical Paper Company.

=== Polish ===
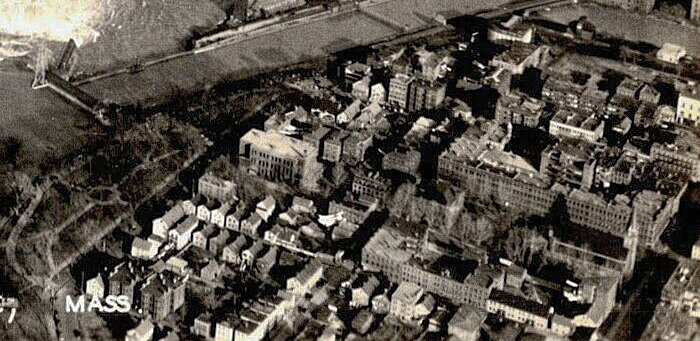
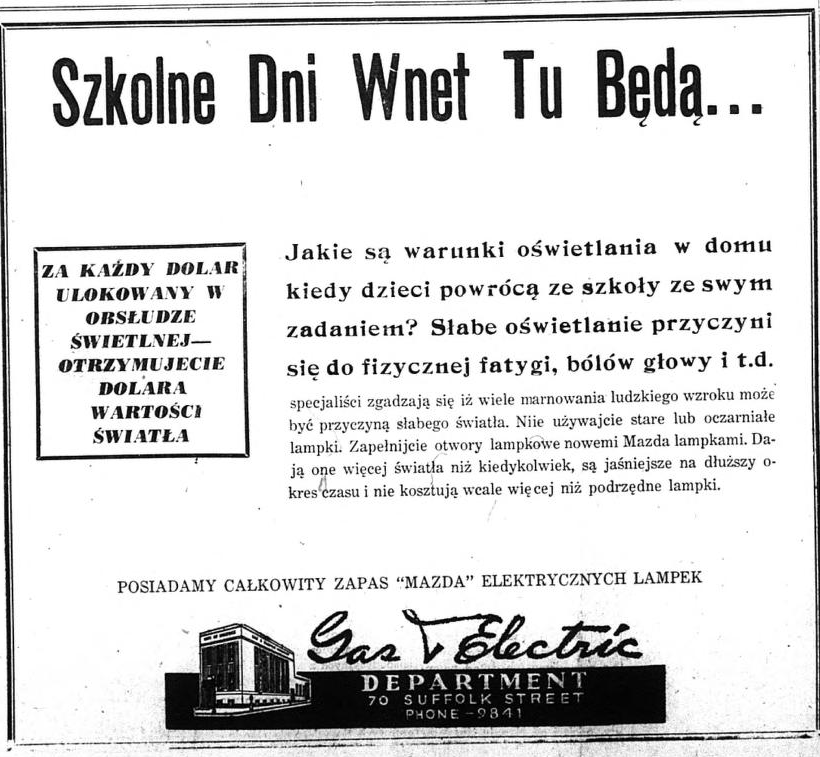
Mater Dolorosa Parish (lower-right), Pulaski Park (left), and the old Polish Ward One neighborhood in 1937, prior to its redevelopment in the late 20th century; a 1942 Holyoke Gas & Electric ad for Mazda lamps in Polish, from Gwiazda, The Polish Weekly Star

As of the 2010 5-year American Community Survey, there were 1,705 residents of Polish heritage living in Holyoke, and an estimated 1,307 according to the 2017 American Community Survey, making them the fourth largest group by single responses.

The first Polish would settle in Holyoke in the mid-to-late 1880s, having arrived in Chicopee in 1880 and Northampton in 1886. One of Holyoke's earliest Polish settlers was Joseph Czarnecki, who arrived in September 1888. By 1895, the community had grown to 300 residents, many of whom were working as textile makers in Lyman Mills. Because of their profession and class, this group largely lived near the French-Canadians near the north end of Downtown by Ward 4, in the Lyman Mills Housing by Oliver Street, as well as in parts of The Flats. In the earliest days of their arrival, the Holyoke's Poles held a tense, skeptical attitude toward city police, for as one Springfield Republican journalist put it— "nothing is so much feared in the Polish settlement as a police officer and in this the people show the result of years of government under a military system," the aforementioned system reflecting the realities of a Partitioned Poland.

With the growth of the community, many sought to establish a Catholic church in the city which would offer mass in the Polish language. However the Diocese of Springfield did not move to establish such a parish until Rev. A. N. Dynia, a priest from Poland who had been defrocked, had begun to organize such a church there himself. Indeed the independent Dynia would continue this pattern going westward, similarly unofficially initiating the creation of other Polish parishes as he went from town to town, only to be shunned by each respective Diocese. After Dynia was "driven from the city", the Bishop appointed Father H. Chalupka of Chicopee to attend to this would-be parish, and on September 26, 1896, Rev. Anthony M. Sikorski became the first resident priest. In 1901 a building designed by Holyoke's George P. B. Alderman was built and paid for by the parishioners who sold it to the Diocese at a token price, by 1902 the New York Tribune identified their community synonymous with Mater Dolorosa. An influential member of the Polish community in the early 20th century was John Zielinski, who first arrived in Holyoke in 1912 to serve as the organist and choir director of Mater Dolorosa and was subsequently vice-president of the Polish Roman Catholic Union of America at one time, instrumental in the work of adjusting to American culture while keeping traditions of the Old World.

Gradually the community established itself in Ward 4 in the land immediately adjacent to this church. In 1923 one Stanislaw Walczak established a Polish-language weekly, the Gwiazda or The Polish Weekly-"Star" which would carry local news as well as syndicated national news, ultimately folding after 3 decades, in 1953. Similarly to the French La Justice, the Polish press continued as a private printer run by the same family, even decades after the paper had ceased publication. The Star Press, as it was later known, remained extant as recently as 2004 with one of its last regular jobs being the publication of the first issue of El Sol Latino.

External audio
- South Street Polka, 1954, by Larry Chesky, named for the thoroughfare of Elmwood

Polka music would remain popular in Holyoke, as well as neighboring towns and cities in the Pioneer Valley, throughout the 20th century. One of the notable acts of the Paper City being Larry Chesky and his orchestra, a regular at Mountain Park for decades, and a later inductee into Chicago's International Polka Hall of Fame for his development and promotion of the "Big Band" or "East Coast" style of polka, with more than 100 albums of various artists in the genre featured on his Rex Records label, as well as over 100 albums on his and other labels himself.

The Polish community would also see representation in politics at a municipal and state level, with one of the Holyoke Polish community to serve longest in state office being Stephen T. Chmura, an alderman for ward 4, a Massachusetts delegate to the 1960 Democratic National Convention, and state representative for Holyoke's respective district in Hampden County from 1951 through 1968. Similarly Evelyn Chesky would get her start in politics as a member of the Holyoke city council, later serving as state representative for the 5th Hampden District.

In recognition of the predominantly Polish neighborhood, in 1939 Prospect Park was renamed Pulaski Park for Casimir Pulaski the Patriot-supporting Polish commander in American Revolution. By the end of the 20th century, one of the city's Polish-American sons, historian Edward Pinkowski would rediscover Pulaski's burial site in Savannah, Georgia. With deindustrialization however and the upward mobility of many in the community, the neighborhood would gradually see a decline as more joined communities in Granby, Hadley, and Northampton, and large swathes of land in that section of High Street would be razed in the late 1960s. In the 1970s the activism of residents and a local friar led to some urban renewal projects, including the "Pulaski Heights" senior citizen housing. One of the final vestiges of the former community, the Mater Dolorosa Church, was abruptly closed in 2011 when the Diocese stated its steeple was at risk of imminent collapse. Despite sit-in protests, an effort to create a historic district recognizing the area's ties to the city and Pioneer Valley's Polish community, and a proposal deal to sell the church to the city, with the Diocese retaining control of its artifacts and use, the church was ultimately demolished in December 2018, its steeple being the final piece to be razed. Although much of the brick and mortar is gone, today a Polish community remains extant in Holyoke and the Greater Springfield area; much of its history and artifacts may be found at the Polish Center of Discovery and Learning in neighboring Chicopee.

=== Puerto Ricans ===
As of the 2010 US Census, there were 17,825 residents of Puerto Rican heritage living in Holyoke, and an estimated 18,557 according to the 2017 American Community Survey, making them the largest group by single response ancestry. In the 2010 Census, Holyoke had the largest Puerto Rican population, per capita, of any city in the United States outside Puerto Rico proper, with 44.7% of residents being of Puerto Rican heritage, comprising 92.4% of all Latinos in the community.

=== Scottish ===
Emblem of the former Holyoke Caledonian Benefit Club

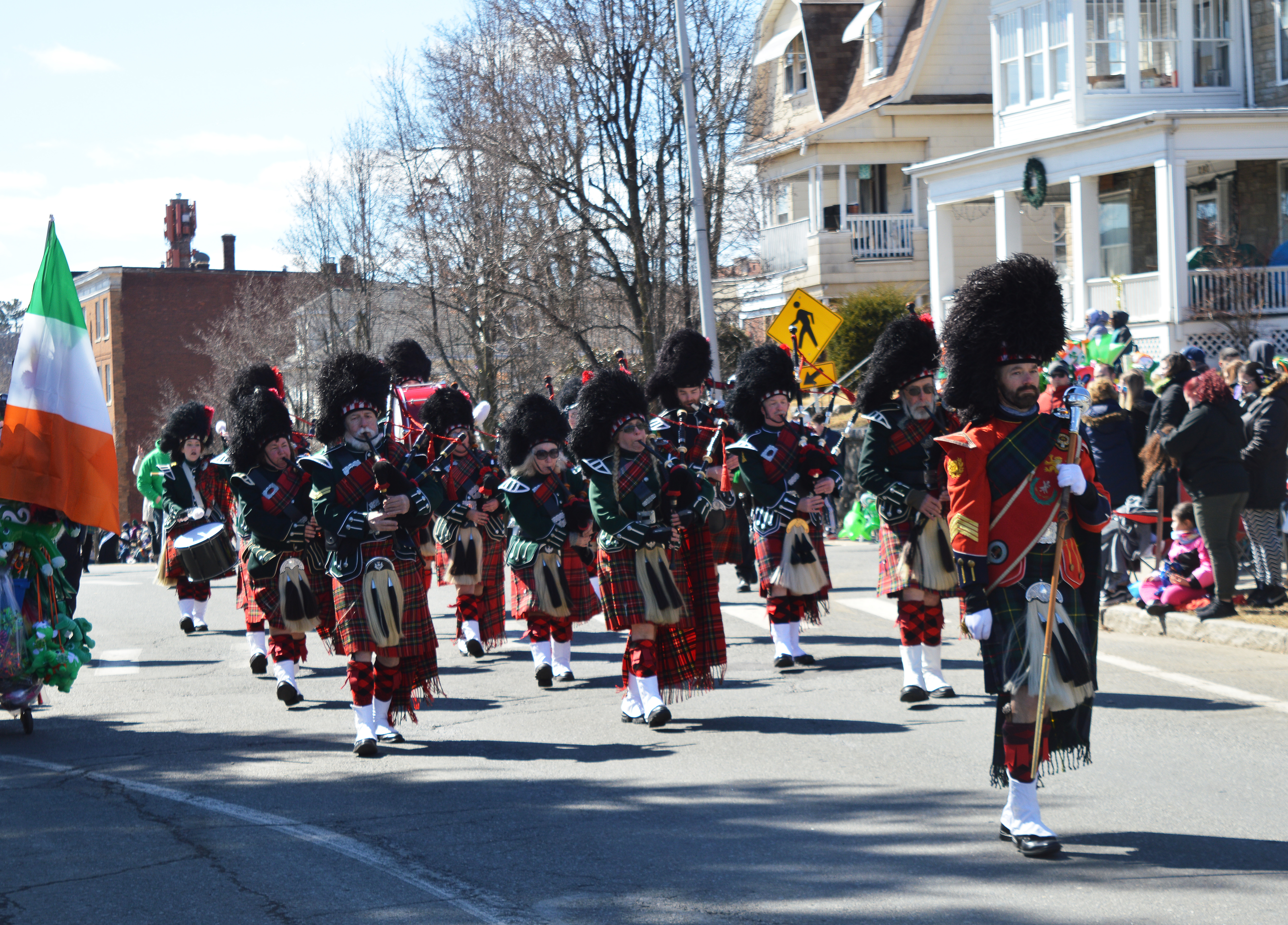
The Holyoke Caledonian Pipe Band in the 2019 Holyoke Saint Patrick's Parade; established in 1910, it is the oldest continuously operating pipe band in the United States

As of the 2010 5-year American Community Survey, there were 208 residents of Scottish heritage living in Holyoke, and an estimated 55 according to the 2017 American Community Survey, as well as 61 in that survey who identified by the response "Scotch-Irish" and 53 who responded "British".

Holyoke's earliest Scottish settlers would arrive soon after its foundation. Around 1853 the Glasgow Mill at the foot of the Hadley Falls Dam recruited 82 unmarried women from its namesake city, while Lyman Mills recruited 151 that same year Turnover would be extraordinarily high in these mills, as they were with other groups initially imported as workers, with nearly 4 out of 5 of these women leaving within three years.

Gradually more Scottish families came to area initially through these mills, generally finding other work in the years thereafter. In 1879, a representative of the Order of Scottish Clans was received by the local community at a reception in the Hotel Hamilton. However the group, not feeling the organization was acted in their interest, ultimately decided to set up a benefit society of their own, and on November 22, 1879, the Holyoke Caledonian Benefit Society was organized with a charter member of 21. By its 25th anniversary in 1904 this number had grown to 225, and 450 members by the 50th anniversary of 1929. Originally set up as a sickness and disability insurance fund, the benefit society would also promote Scottish literature, poetry, and music, with such gatherings as celebrations of the life and poetry of Robert Burns. Defunct before 1962, the Caledonian Society's most enduring namesake, the Holyoke Caledonian Pipe Band, established in 1910, is today the longest continuously active pipe band in the United States. Its legacy also endures today in its former banquet hall, the historical Caledonia Building. A separate entity from the Caledonians, in 1905, the grand conference for the grand women's auxiliary of Scottish clans was held in the city, being the first time such a gathering was held in any city other than Boston.

Holyoke was also for several decades the hometown of Scottish-born noted golf course architect Donald Ross, who was first brought to the city in 1912 to aid with the design of the Mount Tom Golf Club by Joseph L. Wyckoff, for whom the course is today known as the Wyckoff Country Club. Wyckoff, a member of the executive committee of the Massachusetts Golf Association, would become one of Ross's early patrons, providing him with the financial backing to dedicate more of his time to golf course design rather than serving as a golf pro as he had been partially up until that time. In 1921 more than 300 Holyoke residents, Mayor Cronin, the Holyoke Police, and members of Mount Holyoke, International, and Smith College would also receive visited by Colonel Walter Scott (1861–1935), a philanthropist who took great interest in the support of scholarships, Scotch educational and cultural initiatives, police work, and a host of other charitable causes.

=== Native Americans ===
Before the arrival of Europeans, Algonguin tribes such as Pequots, Mohegans, and Chippewas inhabited the area.

== Religion ==
=== Christian ===
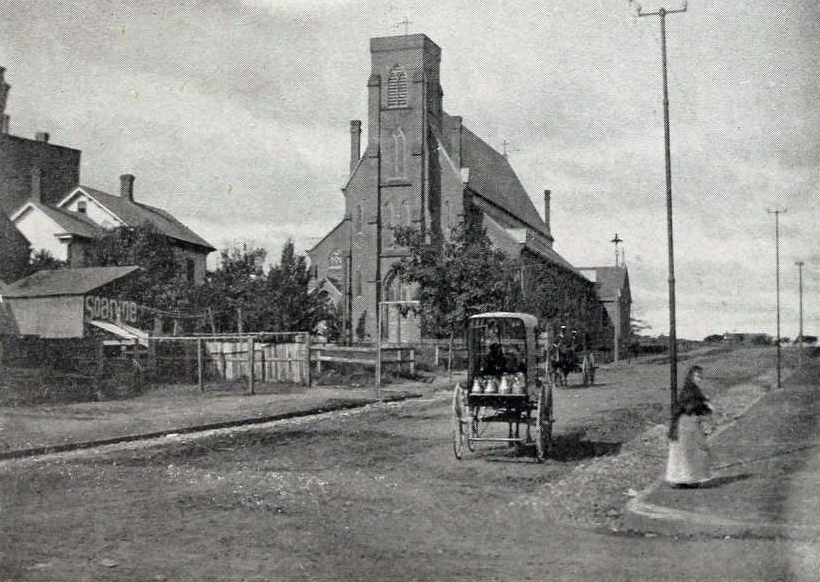
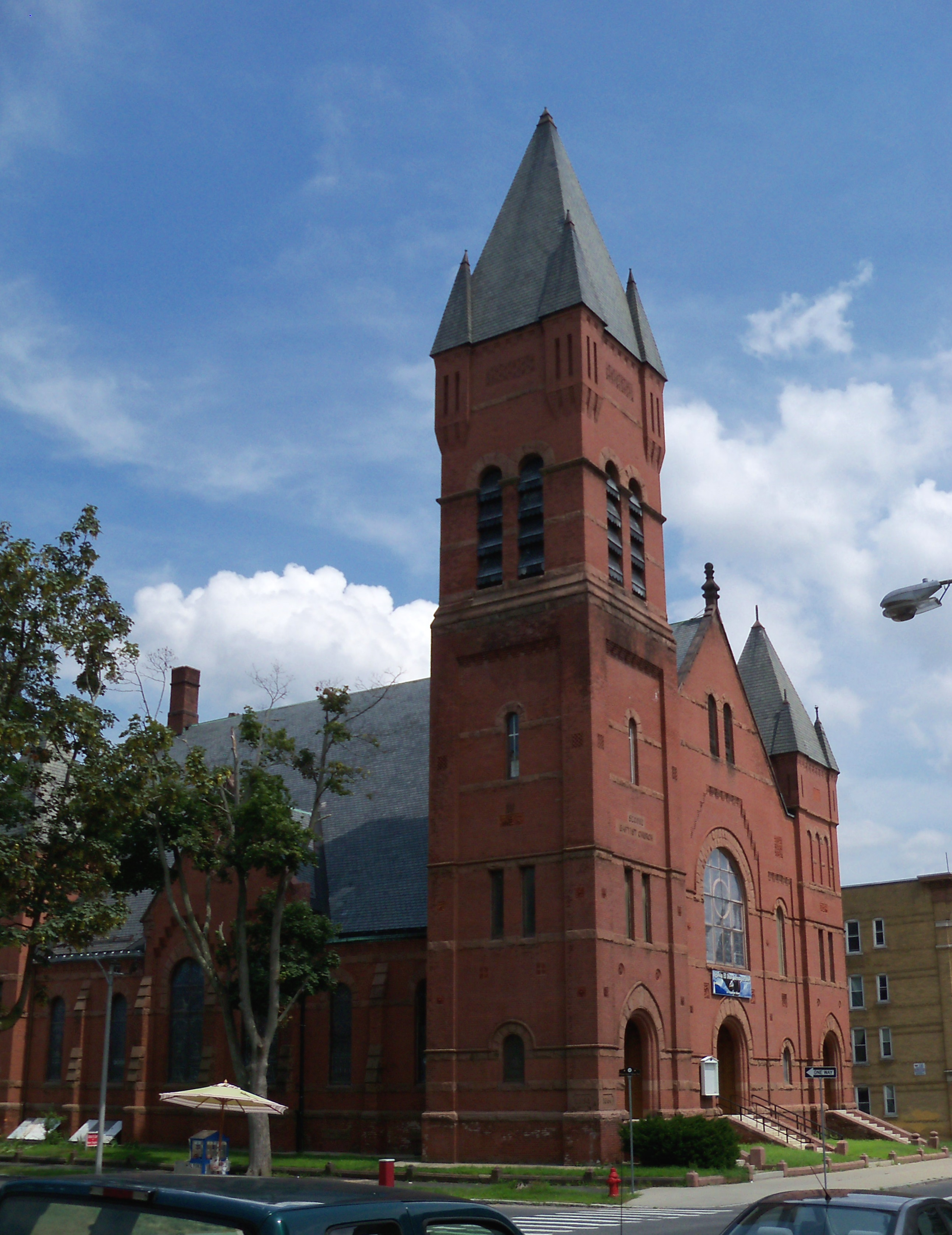
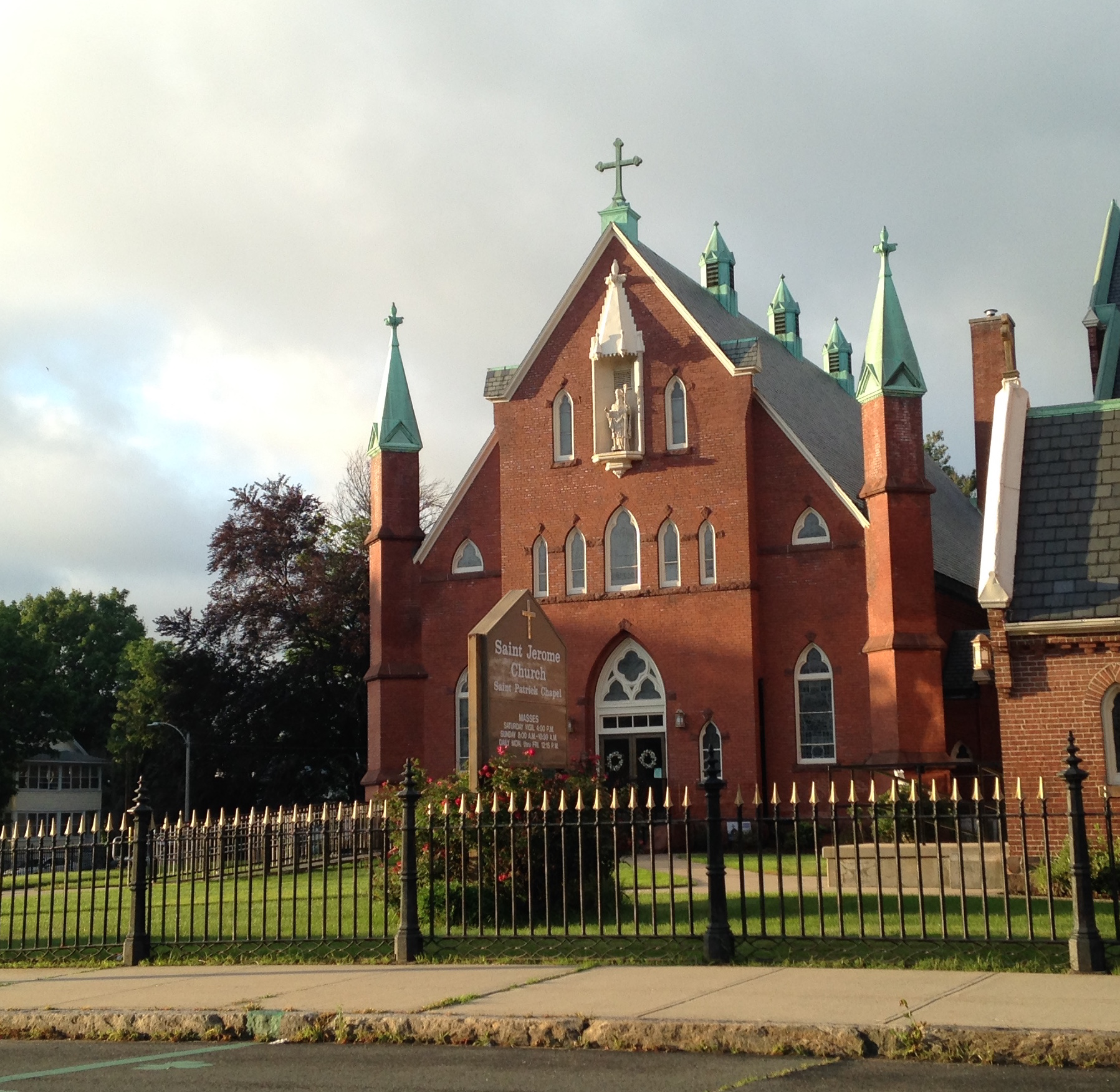
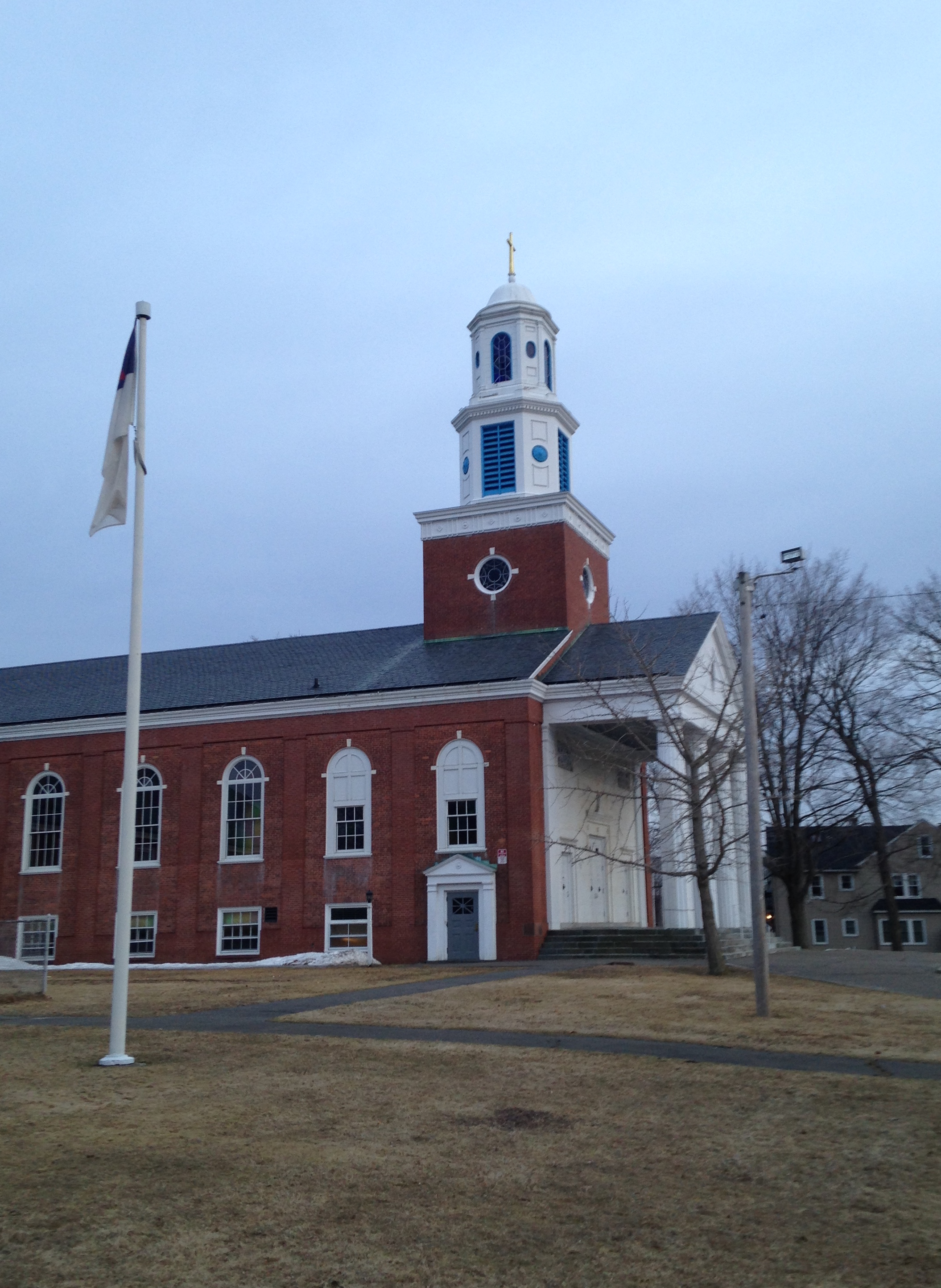
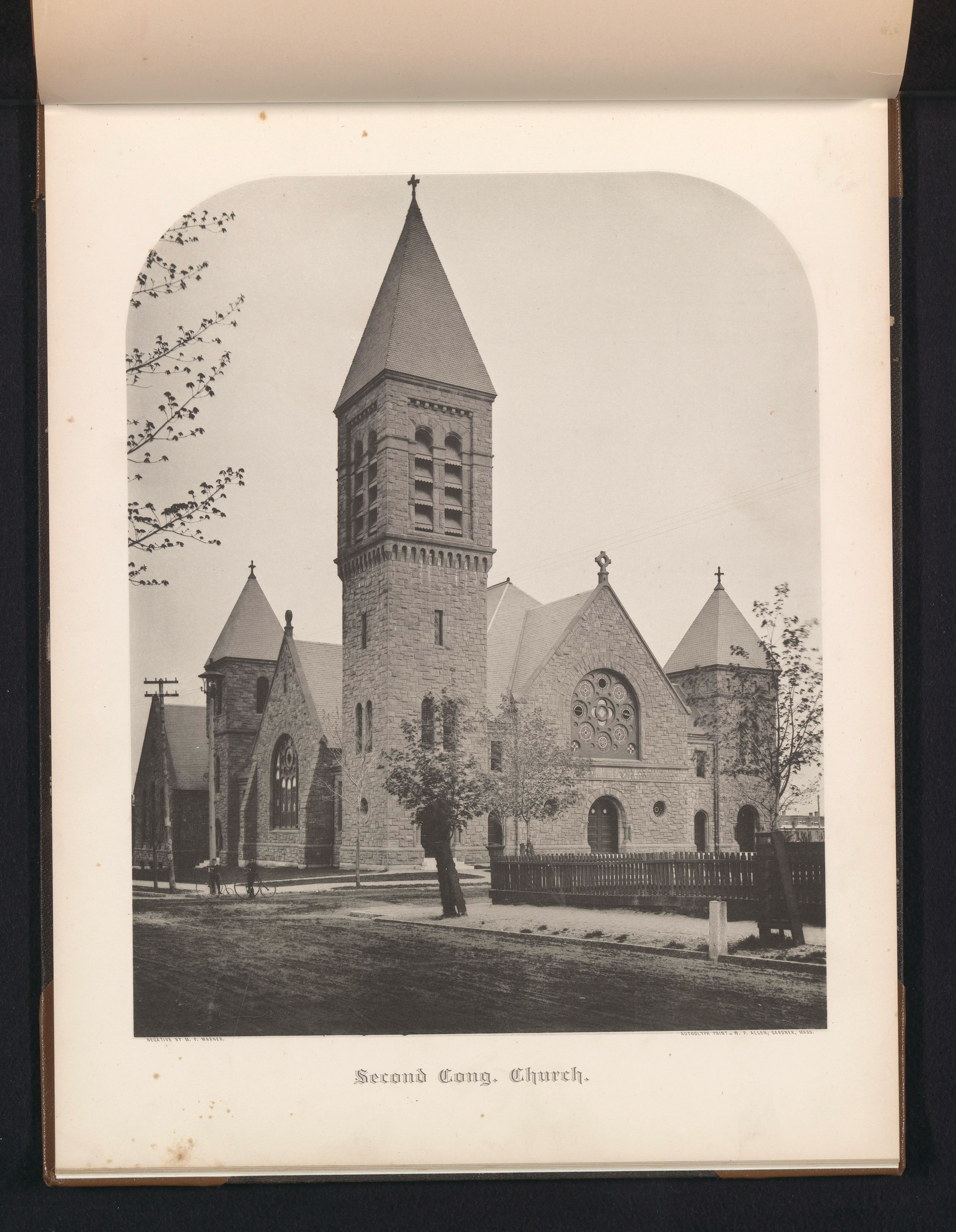
(Left to right): Examples of Holyoke churches, the Sacred Heart Church (Our Lady of Guadeloupe), the Catholic parish which gave the Churchill neighborhood its namesake; the Second Baptist Church, used by other Evangelical groups, presently vacant; St. Patrick's Chapel of St. Jerome's Parish; the First Lutheran Church, identified by its preceding building as the German Lutheran Church; United Congregational Church of Holyoke, before the addition of Skinner Chapel, formerly known as Second Congregational Church

Holyoke is home to houses of worship for numerous denominations of Christianity and Judaism. One of the city's oldest monikers was Baptist Village as the first congregation established there was the First Baptist Church of Holyoke, which first erected a meetinghouse in 1792, traces its origins to five baptisms on the shores of the Connecticut in 1725, and continues as a congregation today.

As of 2010 an estimated 60% of Holyoke is religious, with the largest demographic being Christians, more specifically Roman Catholics, who comprise 49% of the city's population. In 2011, two Catholic parishes, Holy Cross and Mater Dolorosa were merged into Our Lady of the Cross Parish. A number of other Catholic parishes, including Our Lady of Guadalupe, St. Jerome's, and Immaculate Conception Parish also reside in the city.

In addition to its parishes, the city has a number of convents of sisters including the Sisters of Providence of Holyoke in Ingleside, the Sisters of St. Joseph of Springfield who maintain group homes there, and the Sisters of St. Francis of Assisi in Highland Park.

Protestant congregations have played a significant role in Holyoke's civic life since its founding, including the First Congregational Church of Holyoke, founded in 1850, the First Lutheran Church of Holyoke, founded in 1867, and the United Methodist Church of Holyoke, South Hadley, and Granby, which meets in South Hadley, which was founded in 1810.

A Greek Orthodox church, Holy Trinity Greek Orthodox Church, has also existed in the city since its founding in 1917.

=== Jewish ===
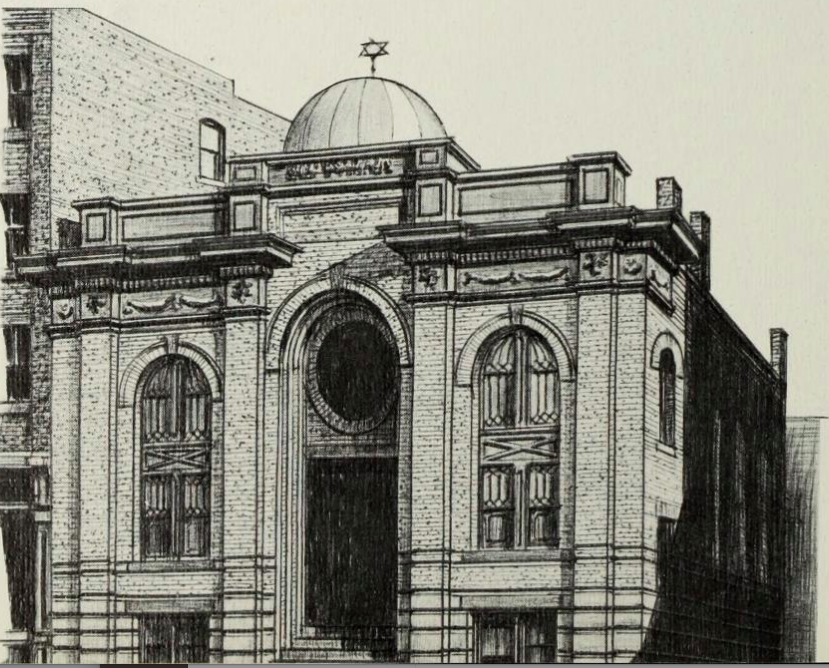
Perspective sketch of an early synagogue building in South Holyoke, designed for Congregation Rodphey Shalom by George P. B. Alderman in 1903

External image
- Jewish History Exhibit For 75th Anniversary Of Holyoke (1948), taken from Holyoke Transcript-Telegram negative

Holyoke is also home to a significant Jewish population. As one of 35 municipalities in Massachusetts with more than 100 Jewish residents, Holyoke is home to an estimated 1,300 residents observing the faith and two synagogues, Congregation Sons of Zion, a Reform congregation, and Congregation Rodphey Sholom, practicing Orthodoxy.

The 1890 Census described 5 Jewish families, of German origin, however in the city's earliest decades they were largely unrepresented by any synagogue or association. Though statistics remain unknown, anecdotally some had turned to Crypto-Judaism or abandoned their faith altogether, to better assimilate with the local population. By 1916 a gemach was established in the city, the Hebrew Free Loan Society of Holyoke, and by 1918 an estimated 1,000 Jews resided in the Paper City. Though the earliest of these Jewish arrivals were a handful of Ashkenazi from Germany who arrived with the Germania Mills immigrant colony, later arrivals would also hail from Russia as its territory is known today, as well as from Vilnius of modern-day Lithuania.

By 1946 there were about 475 Jewish families residing in Holyoke; reflecting this growth, as well as the suburbanization of subsequent generations of Holyoke Jews, both the Reform and Orthodox synagogues would see new buildings constructed in the following decade with Sons of Zion, the former, breaking ground in 1949, and Rodphey Sholem, the latter, moving from its South Holyoke to Northampton Street in 1953.

From the earliest decades of the 20th century, Jewish members of the community saw the support of a wide swath of Holyoke's civic society. It was around the turn of the century that the two extant Jewish congregations were formally established. Congregation Sons of Zion, a Reform congregation, and Congregation Rodphey Sholom, practicing Orthodoxy. Both originated at the end of the 19th century, with Rodphey Sholom founded in 1903 but tracing its heritage to the Paper City Lodge of the Order Brith Abraham, founded in 1899, and Sons of Zion being founded in 1901. Today both congregations hold joint services during certain holidays. During the Russian pogroms of the early 1900s, one such event was an interfaith call to worship, with Mayor Avery and clergy of several churches rendering speeches at the Rodphey Sholem Synagogue in South Holyoke. In Holyoke's history a number of Jewish entrepreneurs and civic leaders would shape the city, including Clemens Herschel who would develop his modern Venturi meter for the Holyoke Water Power Company in the 1880s, and Jacob Barowsky who would develop and market Lestoil in the early 20th century. In its history the city has had two Jewish mayors, the first, Samuel Resnic, elected in 1957, and the second, Alex Morse, elected in 2012.

=== Other ===
As of 2020, Sperling's BestPlaces estimated 0.6% of the population of Holyoke adhered to another religion, including 0.2% observing some form of Islam, and 0.4% observing unnamed Eastern religions. Among the Eastern religions observed, a small Sikh community is extant in Holyoke, and in April 2019 was recognized by the city government in a raising of the Sikh National Flag outside City Hall.

== See also ==
- Bibliography of Holyoke § Culture and ethnicity
