= Immigration to Lawrence, Massachusetts =

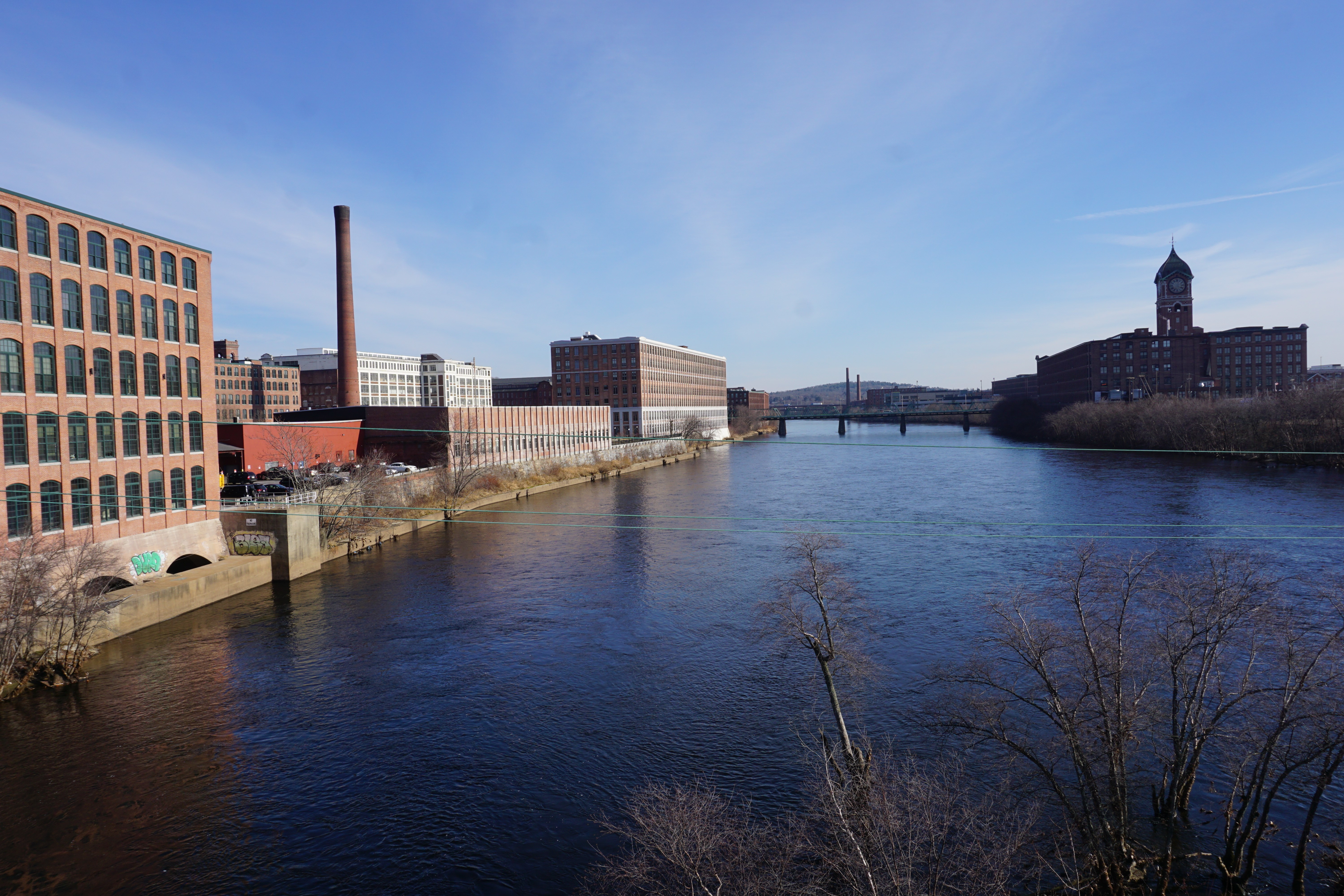
An industrial area along the Merrimack River

Since its incorporation in 1847, Lawrence has attracted large-scale immigration from Europe, the Middle East, and Northern America, along with more recent immigration from Latin America and the Caribbean that has allowed for a unique demographic situation in the "Immigrant City". Lawrence was started as an industrial project—unlike other settlements in the area, the growth of Lawrence was artificially driven by a need to feed the growing industrial economy, in contrast with the more "natural" growth of smaller towns in the Merrimack Valley. Lawrence has always had a significant foreign-born population—just a year after its formal establishment, a third of the population was born overseas, almost all in Ireland. Throughout the nineteenth century, immigration from the British Isles and the rest of Western Europe continued, with populations from Italy, France, Turkey, and the Russian Empire eventually causing the proportion of the population born overseas to reach nearly half by 1910—the third highest proportion in the country. With harsh restrictions on immigration in the 1920s and the eventual industrial decline of the city, it was not until the 1960s that new communities began to come here—immigrants from the Hispanophone Caribbean seeking community and decent employment. This modern wave of immigration has resulted in a city that is about 81% Hispanic as of 2020, mostly of Dominican and Puerto Rican origin.

== History ==
Lawrence was founded as an industrial project noted for its strategic location on the Merrimack River. At the time of the city's founding, the Irish Potato Famine was in full swing. People escaping the famine found employment opportunities in the city attractive and transport from Boston accessible. They were a condensed group, mostly settling in Lawrence's second and third wards, as well as a slum along the river. Internal religious tensions and outside xenophobia caused immense struggle in this community. The nativist movement came to the city with the increase in eligible Irish voters in the 1850s. While political parties originally attempted to appeal to this group, the Whigs eventually took advantage of anti-Irish sentiment to birth an organized anti-immigration movement. Less than twenty years after the incorporation of the city, the immigrant population had already grown to almost seven thousand, including nearly five thousand people born in Ireland. Starting around the 1850s, other communities from the British Isles: the English and the Scottish, also came to the city. By 1905, the British population in Lawrence was the eleventh highest of the state's 33 cities.

It was not until the second half of the nineteenth century that significant populations from other countries began to immigrate to the city. While there were just 206 Canadian-born people in the city in 1855, this population had grown to 3,067 by 1880 and 9,498 by 1910, by far the largest immigrant group in the city. Most of these immigrants were French-speakers from Quebec. These people tended to arrive with their entire families and emphasized their Francophone identity in a process known as la survivance. While smaller, the German community grew alongside them. Like other communities, they mostly worked in industrial professions and established businesses catering to the growing minority. The community especially started to grow in 1871, with heavy immigration from the Ruhr. The Germans were a sizable minority, with about 2,500 people in 1900. This is also when immigrants from the eastern and southern regions of Europe began to arrive. The Russian, Turkish, and Italian populations had numbered at a few dozen each around the 1890s, but just twenty years later were all numbering in the thousands. Plenty came from the eastern European and imperial Russian territories of Lithuania, Ukraine, and Poland, with the Russian-born population reaching 4,366 persons in 1910. A few Lithuanian churches of various denominations were built around this time. Most Polish immigrants were attracted to the textile industry and the community eventually reached the thousands. A Jewish community also started to form in Lawrence in the 1880s. They began to settle around the 'Common' area and many worked as merchants, including retail professions and other goods. Multiple synagogues were established in the city during this period and the community partially overlapped with the Ukrainian and Lithuanian ones: many Ukrainian and Lithuanian Jewish families followed these general migration patterns and came to the city. Many spoke Yiddish.

Like the rest of Massachusetts, the city also attracted a large Italian community. The genesis of the Italian community in Lawrence was significantly later than the more established western European groups. By the time the Italian community arrived in the city, Lawrence already had a reputation for being a major center of immigration to the state. The population multiplied decade by decade, going from just two Italian born-people in 1885 to 263 in 1895, 936 in 1900, and eventually 6,693 by 1910. Immigration to the city finally began to slow in the 1920s with the Immigration Act of 1924 that largely halted immigration to the city for the next four decades, further exacerbated by the city's economic decline following World War II.

Hispanic immigration to Lawrence has formed much of the city's modern identity, reversing population decline and establishing the current 'Lawrencian' culture. The first Hispanic immigrants to the city came in the 1950s from the Dominican Republic, Cuba, and Puerto Rico, taking many of the jobs abandoned by industrial decline and resulting white flight. A second wave came from New York City in the 1970s due to a perceived lack of economic opportunity, further padded by people in these countries coming to join already-established family. By the time of this second wave, Lawrence was in a severe state of urban decay—many of the city's longtime white residents blamed them for bringing New York's social issues to the area. This was the cause of the race riots of 1984. Immigration continued into the 1990s, and Lawrence continues to attract migration from around Latin America. Several Latin American countries also have diplomatic missions in the city, intended to serve Lawrence and the wider Boston area.

== Demographic impact ==
The wave of Hispanic immigration to the city has caused a situation described as a 'textbook case' of white flight. During the transition of the city from a mostly white one to a majority-minority one, many white people in the city advocated for a 'municipal renaissance': one where the white majority was restored and Latino immigration halted. However, these efforts did not succeed and the city began a demographic transition, becoming one of the only cities in the Northeastern United States with a Hispanic majority. As of 2020, Lawrence has a Hispanic population of 81%, with Dominicans making up the largest ancestry group with a significant number of Stateside Puerto Ricans. The Cuban population is one of the smaller Hispanic groups.

== See also ==
- Spanish language in the United States
- Stateside Puerto Ricans
- Dominican Americans
- Demographics of Holyoke, Massachusetts
- History of New Bedford, Massachusetts
