= Pulaski Park (Holyoke, Massachusetts) =

United States historic place

- Prospect Park
- U.S. National Register of Historic Places
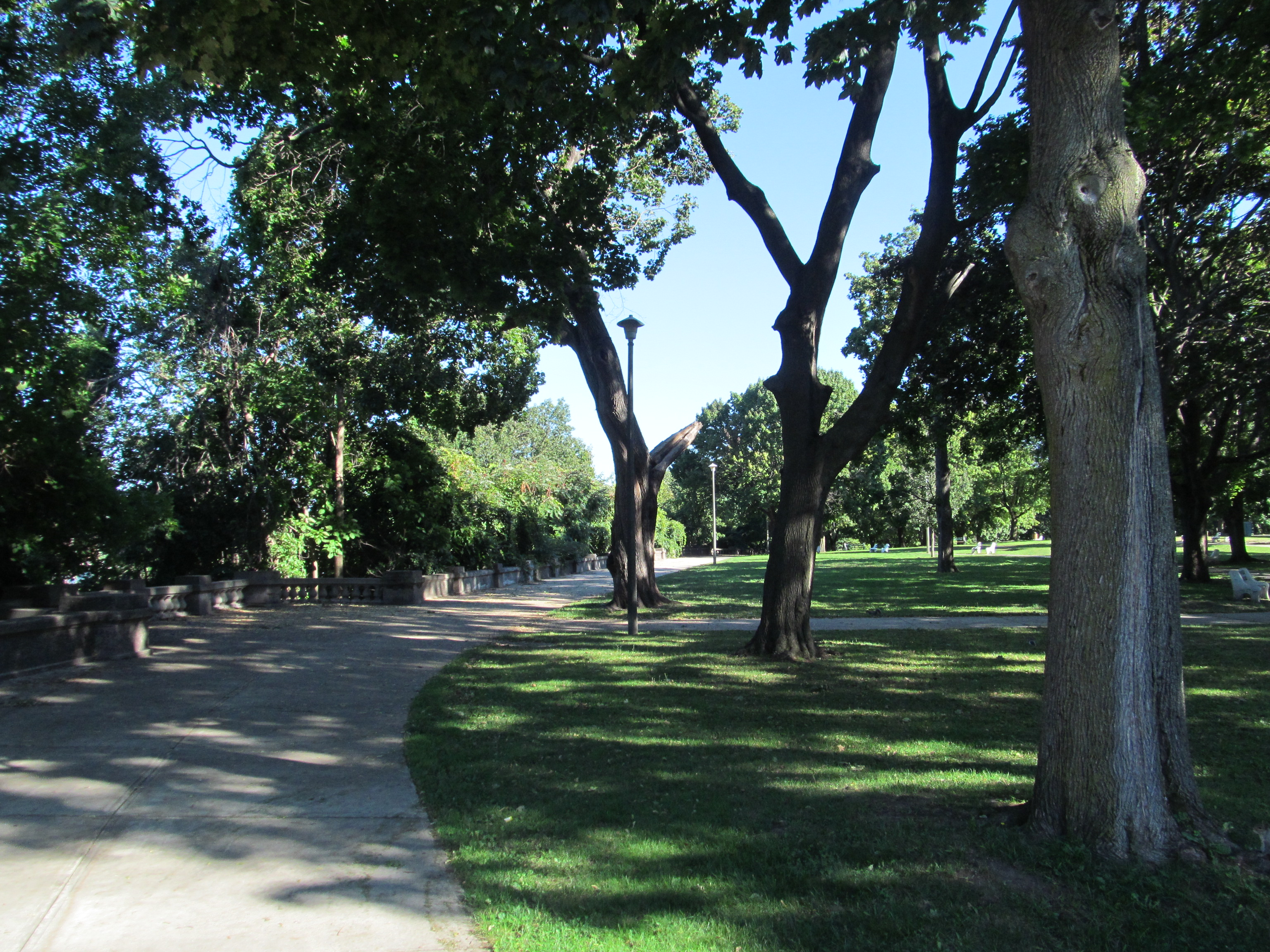
- Pulaski Park

- Location within Massachusetts Location within the United States
- Location: Holyoke, Massachusetts
- Coordinates: 42°12′43″N 72°36′21″W
- Built: 1884
- Architect: John Tighe
- NRHP reference No.: 04000931
- Added to NRHP: September 10, 2004

Pulaski Park is a city park along the Connecticut River in Holyoke, Massachusetts. Originally called Prospect Park when it was laid out in 1884, it was given its present name in 1939 in honor of American Revolutionary War hero Casimir Pulaski, for whom there is a memorial in the park's center. The original 5.1-acre (2.1 ha) park was designed by the Olmsted Brothers landscape design firm.

== Description ==
The park's northern border is a crescent-shaped stretch of the Connecticut River. The shore is lined by a long concrete wall (built 1905–1910), which is interrupted every ten feet by a squat pier, and by four lookouts that jut over the embankment. A concrete promenade runs along the wall, providing views of the river. The southern edge of the park abuts the properties that line the north side of St. Kolbe Street. South and east of the historic core of the park lies Feldman Park, an adjoining city property that consists primarily of sports fields. On the west end of the park is another small park area with tennis courts. The center of the park has a small garden enclosed by a wrought iron fence, in which is a boulder on which is mounted a bronze plaque memorializing Casimir Pulaski. The historic core of the park was listed on the National Register of Historic Places in 2004.

== History ==
When the city of Holyoke was laid out in the 1840s, the parcel of land that became the park was not immediately identified for use as such. The area, which did not have a defined use in early plans, became known as "The Patch", and was an area where Irish immigrant workers who built the city's canals and infrastructure built a shantytown. The grid of city streets ended at the area's southern boundary, a street named Prospect Street, as it was built out during the second half of the 19th century. Sometime between 1865 and 1884 the area was cleared of shanties, and informal use of the area as a park began. The city's many Irish residents referred to it as "Kerry Park", after County Kerry and the green views of the surrounding area the park afforded.

In 1884 the Holyoke Water Power Company, owner of the land, gave it to the city, and its formal existence as Prospect Park began. Between 1884 and 1898 the park's paths were laid out, and landscaping and planting took place. Features built in this time that have not survived include a bandstand and an ornamental pump house used to bring water up from a spring in the river embankment. The park edge along the river was lined with a wooden fence. In a 1901 review of the park, John C. Olmsted recommended the construction of a more permanent retaining wall with either wrought iron railing or stone parapet; this suggestion led to the construction of the existing concrete wall. Olmsted also recommended changes to the landscaping to improve the park's appearance.

By the mid-20th century the area surrounding the park became characterized by the city's Polish population. On May 7, 1939 the park was renamed after Casimir Pulaski in ceremonies featuring a parade from Mater Dolorosa to the park with more than 500 people in attendance representing local Polish community organizations. In addition to city and state officials, one John Lazarewicz, an official from the Polish Consulate in New York City also presided over the ceremony. One of Holyoke's native sons, Polish-American historian Edward Pinkowski, would later re-discover Pulaski's forgotten burial site in Savannah, Georgia, in 1996.

During a phase of urban renewal in the 1960s, the area south of the park was redeveloped. The grid character of its streets was altered, with only Maple Street providing access from the street grid to the park. Prospect Street was removed at this time for the development of the properties that now abut the park.

== See also ==
- National Register of Historic Places listings in Hampden County, Massachusetts
