= 1984 Lawrence, Massachusetts riot =

Race riot in Lawrence, Massachusetts

- Date: August 8–10, 1984
- Location: Lawrence, Massachusetts, U.S.
- Caused by: Anti-Latino discrimination

The 1984 Lawrence, Massachusetts riot caused mass unrest and destruction in Lawrence, Massachusetts’ Lower Tower Hill neighborhood. Between August 8th and 10th, 1984, Lawrence’s white and Latino residents fought back and forth as they yelled out racial slurs, threw rocks, and hurled Molotov cocktails through the sky. Eventually, the violence quelled on Friday, August 10th, when Lawrence’s city council declared a state of emergency, but the riot's impact was long-lasting.

== Background ==
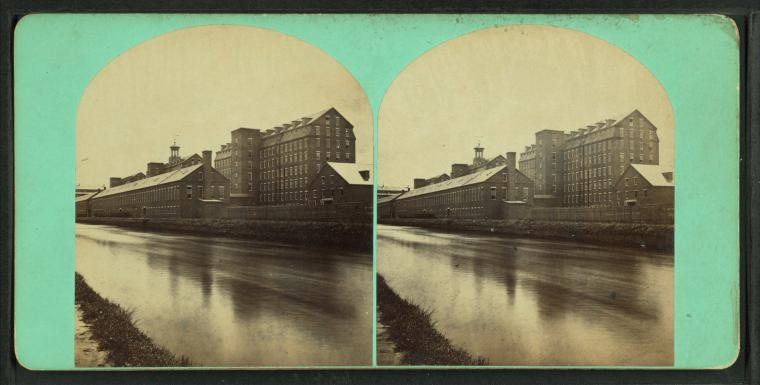
Mills in Lawrence, MA

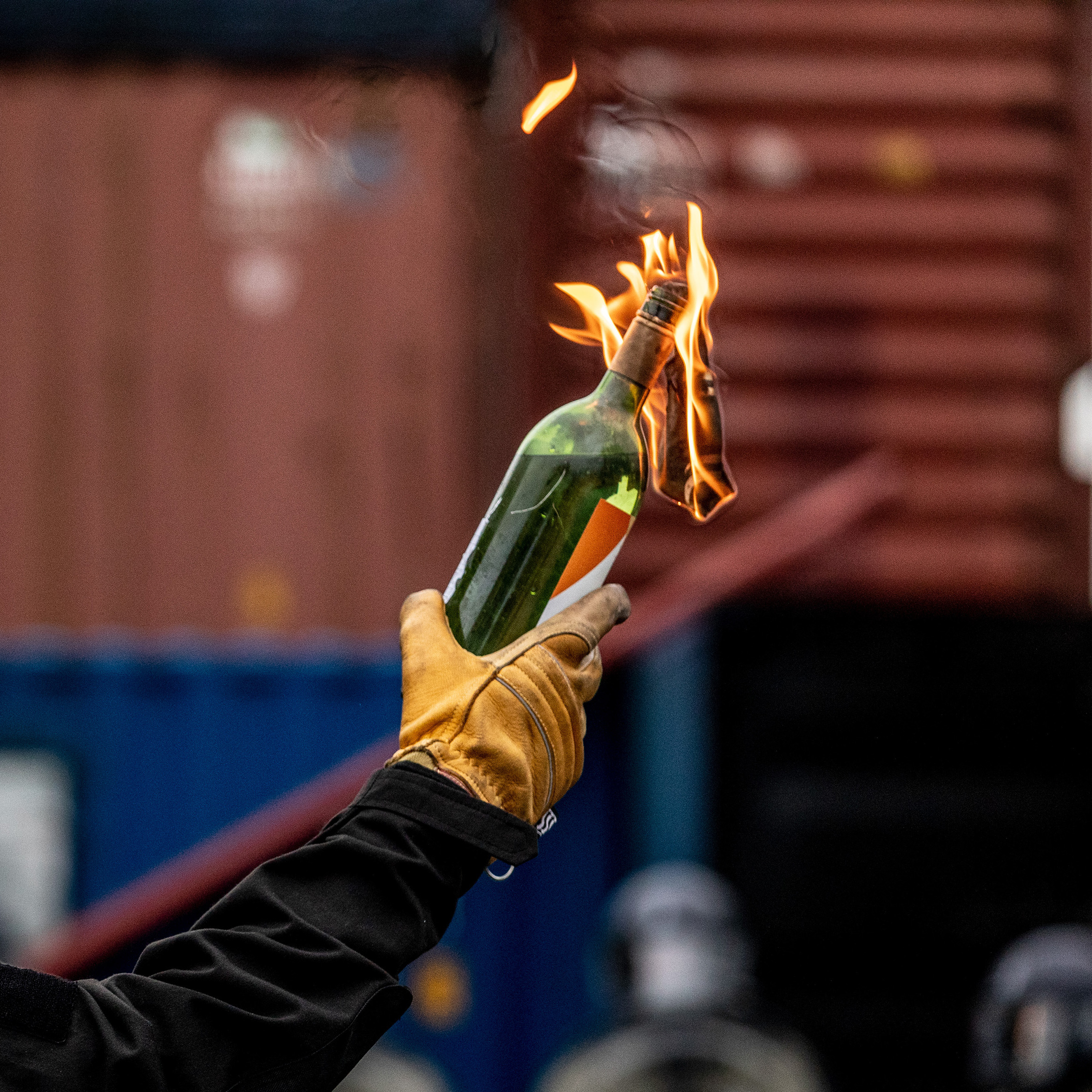
Molotov cocktails

Lawrence was an industrial power giant in the early 20th century, with success derived from the textiles produced by the city's lucrative mills. However, Lawrence's economy starkly deteriorated as the textile industry moved away. Lawrence’s deindustrialization led its once flourishing, prosperous city to be plagued by poverty, violence, and unemployment, causing Lawrence’s majority white population to flee to the surrounding suburbs. Between 1950 and 1970, America’s suburban populations doubled. For many, the American Dream felt more attainable than ever when William Levitt applied mass production to construction, making building and buying houses more affordable. As such, many middle-class white Americans saw the opportunity to leave America’s decaying cities in hopes of finding prosperity in America’s newly attainable suburbia.

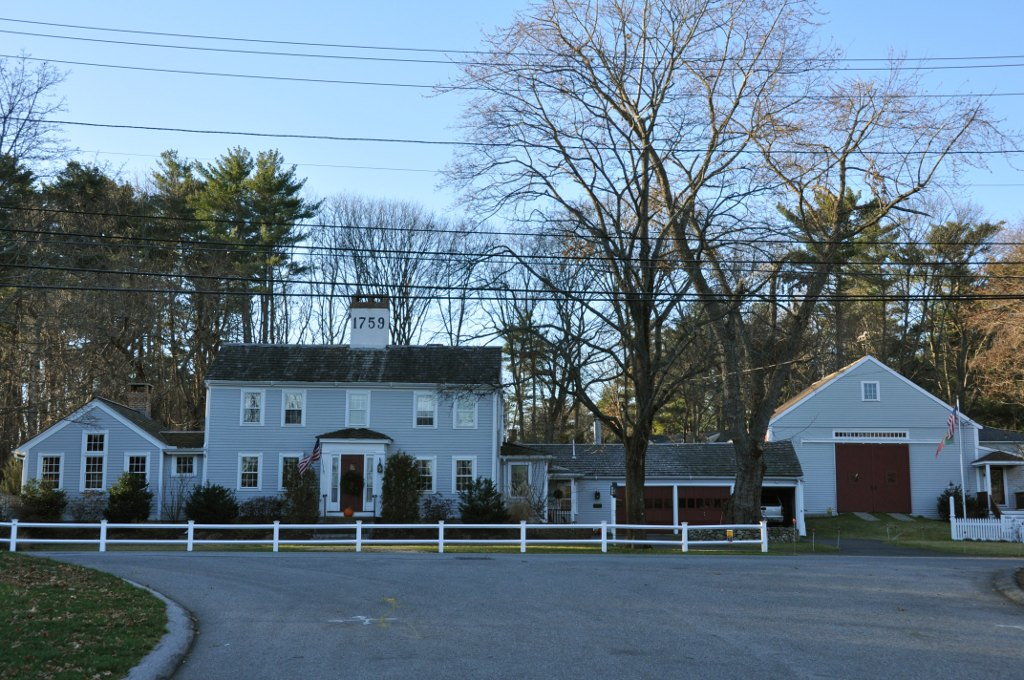
Houses in Andover, MA, a suburb next to Lawrence

Racial fears also tied into white flight to the suburbs, as many white Americans feared that immigrants were taking over cities and saw the suburbs as an escape. The distinction between the suburbs and cities was a way to preserve segregated communities, as redlining made it difficult for people of color to buy homes. As such, white Americans saw a way to maintain majority white communities within the suburbs because suburban life was purposely made unattainable to people of color. This is exemplified by Lawrence because Latino residents were forced to move the cities that white Americans left behind.

Known as the “Immigrant City,” Lawrence has been home to people from across the globe. The first waves of French Canadian, English, and German immigrants started in the late 1800s as they came to work in Lawrence’s mills, followed by Italians, Poles, Lithuanians, and Syrians in the 1900s, and ultimately, Cuban, Puerto Rican and Dominican immigrants in the mid to late 1900s. Latino immigrants arrived in Lawrence at the same time as the city's economy began to fail and white residents were fleeing to the suburbs. As a result, many of Lawrence’s white residents viewed Lawrence’s new Latino residents as the cause of the city's “poverty, blight, and other ‘urban problems.’” Ultimately, this led to racial scapegoating of Lawrence’s Latino population by its white residents. This racial tension resulted in anti-Latino prejudice, discrimination, violence, including the Lawrence Riot of 1984.

== Events ==
=== Interpretation ===
There are an array of interpretations of the cause of the Lawrence Riot of 1984. While both Lawrence’s white and Latino residents viewed the city's decline as part of the cause of the riot, they had varying perspectives on further reasons for the riot. On the one hand, the majority of Lawrence’s white residents argued that the riot was a result of frustration towards Lawrence’s new Latino population for bringing urban problems to the city.

On the other hand, the majority of Lawrence’s Latinos viewed the riot as the release of pent-up anger at being excluded and harassed in the city. They argued that the riot was in protest to poverty, bigotry, lack of housing, racialized abuse from the police, substandard health, exclusion from politics, and above all, “the day-to-day experience of...white prejudice and harassment.”

A third perspective, however, came from city officials, who tried “desperately to downplay the riots to protect the city’s reputation and attract new business.” As such, they argued that the riot was an isolated event resulting from “a hot night” where “things just got away from themselves".

=== Days of the riot ===
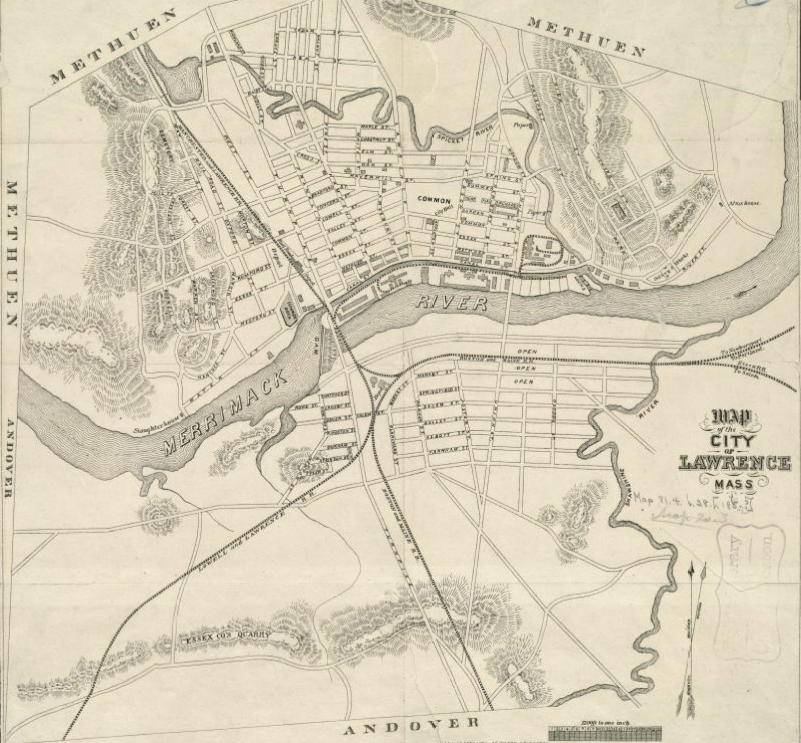
Map of Lawrence, Massachusetts.

Over the course of two days, Lawrence’s Tower Hill became a site of mass hysteria. The Lower Tower Hill neighborhood was described as “many shabby wooden houses and tenements and two low-rise brick housing projects inhabited mainly by Hispanic people,” with the Essex housing project recognized as one of the “toughest in the city” and a site of frequent violence. Lower Tower Hill comprised a mixture of French-Canadian and Latino residents, said to share a mutual disdain for each other. Ultimately, the riot of 1984 tore the neighborhood apart, with a liquor store burned down, 27 people arrested, and at least 17 critically injured.

==== Wednesday, August 8th ====
The cause of the riots stems from the experience of Puerto Rican resident, Anna Ocasio, when white residents, John Ball, Gary Gill, and Rick Brady threw a rock through her apartment window on Tuesday night, narrowly missing her sleeping baby. The following day is where stories diverge, with Lawrence’s Latino and white populations recounting different versions of events. Some tell the story of how Latino residents defended Ocasio as several Latino men in the neighborhood showed up to Ball's house, “grabbed a bat and started clubbing a dog." Other witnesses describe a story of a young Latino boy who kicked a dog through a fence and got “slapped around” by a group of white men, resulting in Latino residents coming to the boy's defense, which escalated into a fight between the white and Latino men at the scene.

Regardless of the exact details, the attack on Ocasio escalated into a violent riot that tore the neighborhood apart. Throughout Wednesday night, between 200 and 300 residents gathered in the riot, hurling racial slurs and rocks at each other. By 11 pm, rioters broke into Pettoruto’s liquor store. Adding alcohol to the equation caused a lull in fighting as rioters consumed their loot, but by 12:15 am, rioting returned with a renewed force when the liquor store was set on fire. As firefighters tried to enter the crime scene to douse the fire, they became the ones on the receiving end of violence, with rocks and beer cans thrown at them from both parties. A lack of trust in law enforcement amongst Latino residents, alongside mass hysteria, made it difficult for firefighters to take action.

To make matters worse, only 10 police officers were on duty for the night. As such, the riot raged for 5 hours until SWAT and police reinforcements from surrounding areas arrived at the scene at 1 am. However, most of the fighting had died by the time they arrived. While no one was critically injured, five Latinos were arrested for disorderly conduct, one white man was arrested for driving under the influence and possession of marijuana, and Gary Gill was taken into protective custody.

==== Thursday, August 9th ====
On Thursday, August 9th, ten local church leaders joined together in an outdoor religious service in an attempt to ease tensions. However, their efforts where short lived; soon after the service ended, the rioting returned with a renewed vigor. Molotov cocktails flew as police entered the crime scene, each side of the street yelling, with white residents recorded shouting “U.S.A., U.S.A., U.S.A,” “Who’s American? WE are,” and “Go home. We were here first.” Eventually, police reinforcements were called in, bringing in 200 to 300 officers to join the existing 40, as alone they didn’t have the manpower to control the violence. Ultimately, the combined force of officers drove Latino residents back to the Essex Street projects, and permitted white rioters to leave the scene.

==== Friday, August 10th ====
The riot finally came to an end on Friday, August 10th, when Lawrence’s city council declared a state of emergency after meeting with the state and law enforcement officials. The state of emergency set a three day curfew from 8 pm to 6 am in Lower Tower Hill, with anyone found outside during these hours subject to arrest. Further, Lawrence residents weren’t allowed to be out on the areas bordered by Broadway, Haverhill, Margin, and Essex Streets; all places of amusement were closed; and gas containers were forbidden to be sold, out of fear they would be used to make Molotov cocktails. The consequences for the breach of any of these rules was a $300 fine, and arrest for up to 24 hours. As such, violence promptly dwindled as residents returned to their homes out of fear of punishment. The impact of the riots was evident, however, with glass shards scattered across the ground, buildings burned, and community tensions at an all-time high.

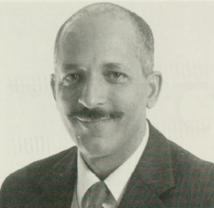
William Lantigua, the first Latino mayor of Lawrence.

== Impact ==
The violence of the Lawrence Riot of 1984 led to increased media coverage of the city, and Latino activists saw an opportunity to incite positive change in their city. The riot exposed underlying tensions in the community, while also bringing to light Lawrence’s “racialized poverty and joblessness, inadequate opportunities for youth, political corruption and patronage, and Latino exclusion from city governance and employment.”

As such, Lawrence Latinos got the federal government to back their efforts for representation in politics. Ultimately, this led to a successful United States Department of Justice helping Lawrence pass a voting rights lawsuit in 1999 to make the voting process more accessible to Latino residents.
