= Gwiazda (Holyoke) =

Weekly newspaper

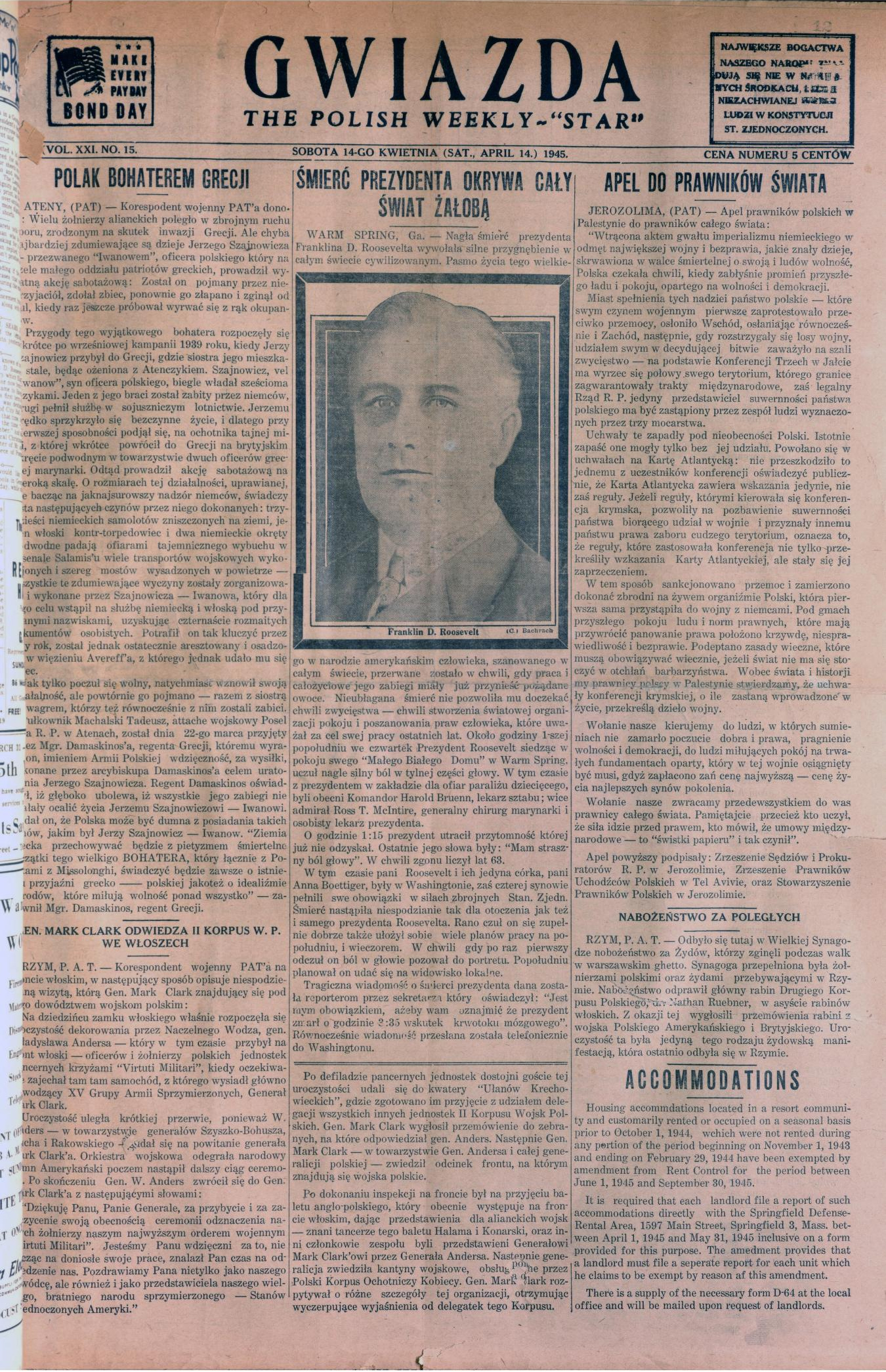
- Type: Weekly newspaper
- Format: Broadsheet
- Publisher: Stanislaw Walczak, The Star Press, Inc.
- Founded: 1923
- Ceased publication: 1956
- Language: Polish (1923-1953), English (1953-1956)
- Circulation: 7,244 (1951)
- OCLC number: 13714187

Gwiazda, also known as The Polish Weekly-"Star" and Gwiazda Wolnosci (Star of Freedom), was a Polish language weekly published by Stanislaw Walczak in Holyoke, Massachusetts from 1923 to 1953, after which it was called The Star and published in English from 1953 until 1956. It was Holyoke's first and longest running Polish newspaper.
