= Hampton Ponds State Park =

State park in Hampden County, Massachusetts

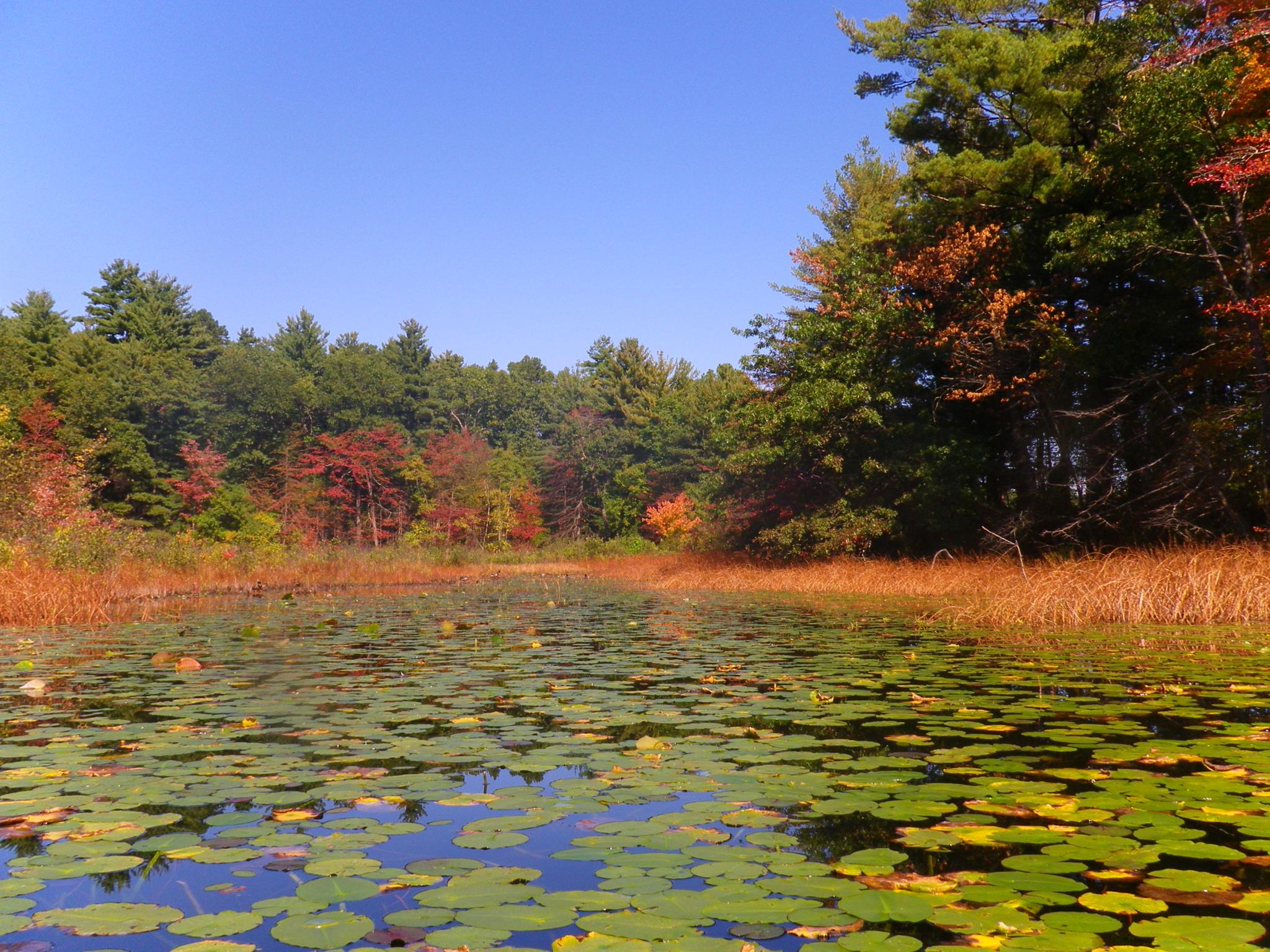

- Location within Massachusetts Location within the United States
- Location: Westfield, Massachusetts, United States
- Coordinates: 42°10′45″N 72°41′22″W
- Area: 47 acres (19 ha)
- Elevation: 249 ft (76 m)
- Administrator: Massachusetts Department of Conservation and Recreation
- Website: Official website

Hampton Ponds State Park is a Massachusetts state park located in the northeast corner of the city of Westfield. The park offers water-based activities including swimming, motorized and non-motorized boating, and fishing plus facilities for picnicking. The park is managed by the Department of Conservation and Recreation.
