= El Sol Latino =

Monthly bilingual newspaper

- Un Periódico Diferente (Spanish) "A Different Kind of Newspaper"

- Type: Monthly newspaper
- Format: Tabloid
- Publisher: El Coquí Media Group, LLC.
- Editor: Manuel Frau Ramos
- Founded: 2004
- Language: English; Spanish (Puerto Rican Spanish)
- Headquarters: P.O. Box 572; Amherst, MA; 01004-0572
- Website: Web Version, Issuu

El Sol Latino ("The Latin Sun") is a monthly bilingual newspaper published by El Coquí Media Group of Amherst, Massachusetts, primarily in English and Spanish. Though published in Amherst, the newspaper's content additionally covers news in Holyoke, Springfield, and Hartford extensively as the paper's primary focus is news and advocacy in the greater Puerto Rican community. Founded in 2004, the paper was started by Manuel Frau Ramos, a former professor of education at the University of Massachusetts Amherst, as well as the University of Puerto Rico.

Contributors to the paper include local activists, advocates from organizations such as Nueva Esperanza, and including but not limited to faculty of Holyoke Community College, Springfield College, and the University of Massachusetts Amherst. The paper often features profiles of leading figures in Puerto Rican culture, including Oscar López Rivera, Frank Bonilla, and San Juan mayor Carmen Yulín Cruz.
