= The Flats, Holyoke, Massachusetts =

The Flats
- Neighborhood of Holyoke
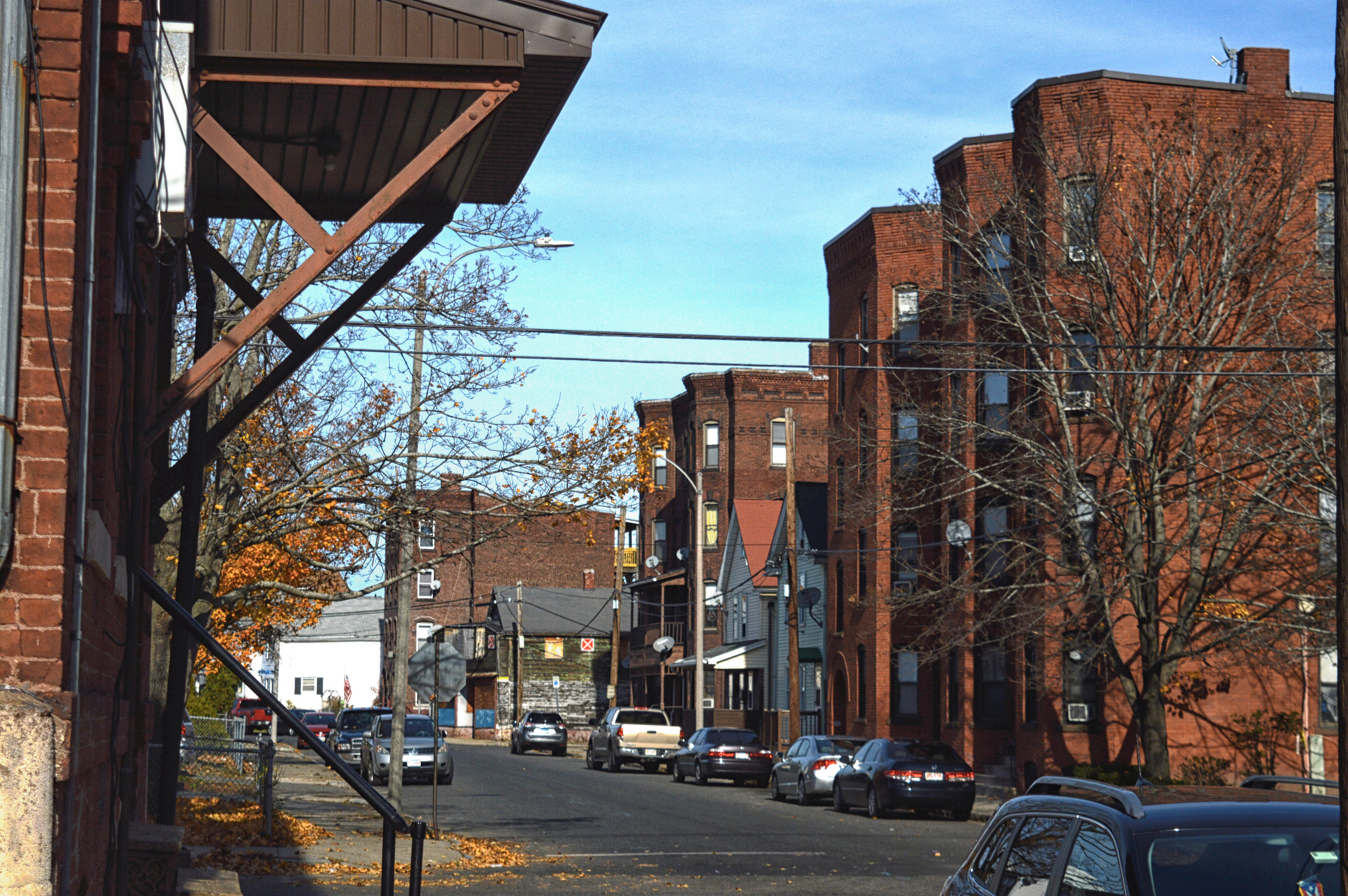
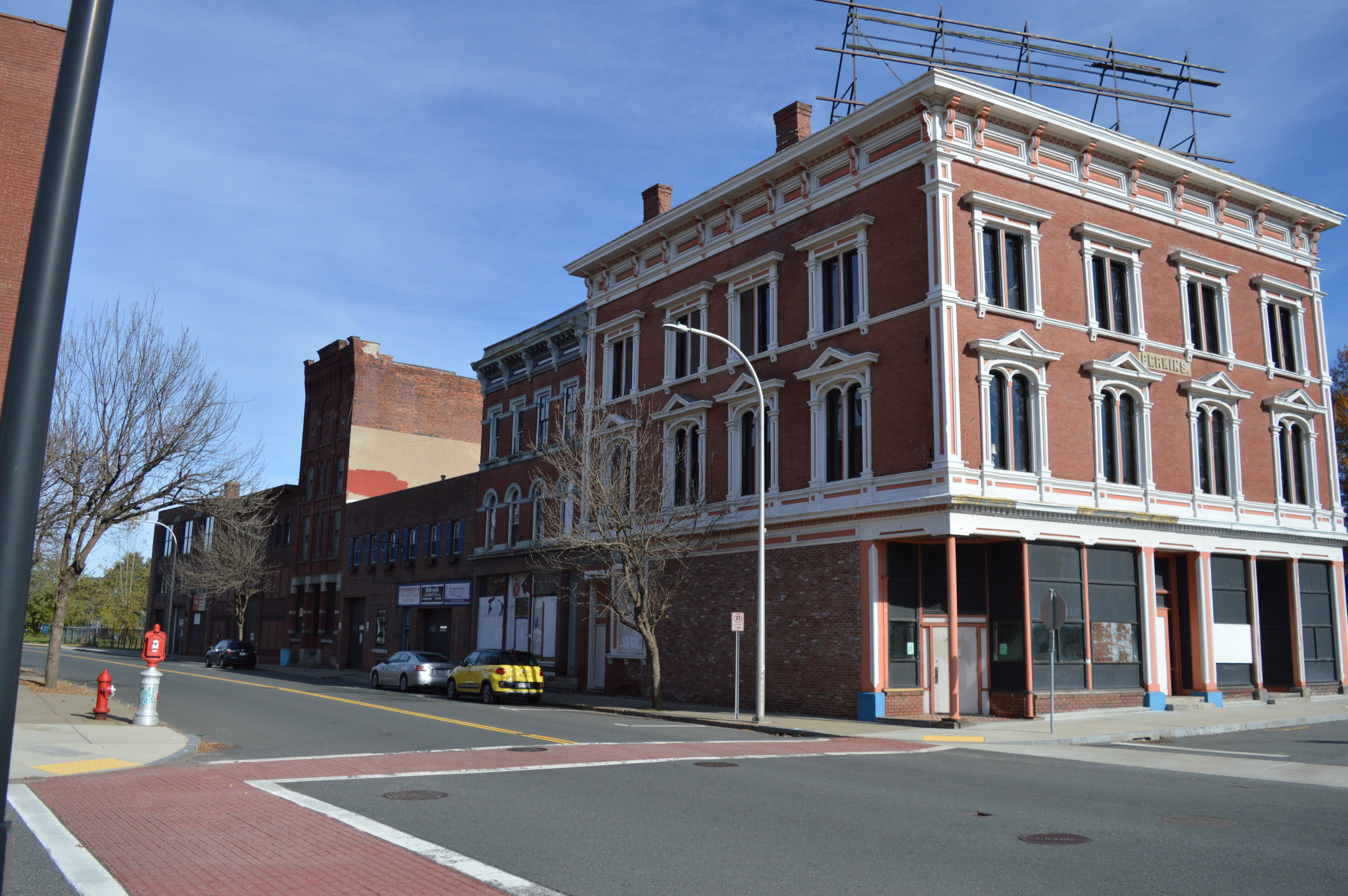
- Top to bottom: Brick tenements in a style which characterized the area through much of its history; the Hotel Jess/Perkins Block and other buildings at Depot Square

- Location within Holyoke Location within Massachusetts Location within the United States
- Coordinates: 42.206089°N 72.5947075°W
- Country: United States
- State: Massachusetts
- City: Holyoke
- Wards: 1
- Precincts: 1A

Area
  - Total: 0.43 sq mi (1.1 km^{2})
- Elevation: 66 ft (20 m)
- ZIP code: 01040
- Area code: 413
- MACRIS ID: HLY.W

The Flats is a neighborhood in Holyoke, Massachusetts located to the east of the city center, adjacent to the downtown. Although it lies at one of the lowest elevations in Holyoke, its name derives not from topography but from the brick tenement "flats" which characterized its architecture throughout much of its history. Historically the area has also been associated with the name Depot Hill, as it was the location of the city's first freight and passenger railway stations; passenger service was restored at Holyoke station in 2015, following a period of absence after 1967. A section of the neighborhood between Lyman and Appleton Street to north and south respectively, and between Race and Bowers Street to the east and west is also known as Depot Square. Today the area features the Holyoke Innovation District, Canal System, Hadley Falls Company Housing District, Marcella Kelly Elementary School, local Amtrak station and 275 acres (111 ha) of residential, commercial, and industrial zoning.

The Flats faced mass depopulation following the issuance of city master plans in 1961 and 1968, which called for its conversion from mixed zoning to entirely industrial land use; from 1970 to 1980 this urban renewal initiative, combined with fires from substandard housing conditions and arson, reduced the number of housing units in the neighborhood by 41%.

In recent years municipal and state authorities have sought to redevelop the neighborhood as a startup company incubator and cultural center through the creation of the Innovation District and Canalwalk. Proposals have also been put forth for redevelopment of the historic H. H. Richardson train station as well as the Hotel Jess/Perkins Block. While not on the National Register of Historic Places, the latter holds historical significance as it was constructed by Benjamin F. Perkins, a contemporary of Alexander Graham Bell, who had manufactured and demonstrated early telephone equipment personally for the inventor during his visits to Holyoke, and whose eponymous block was the first headquarters of the Springfield Telephone and Automatic Signal Company, a division of the Bell company, and Western Massachusetts' first telephone exchange, established in 1878. That same year the building became one of two sites for the world's first public-use toll line, which connected Springfield and Holyoke when it entered service on June 15, 1878.
