= Mater Dolorosa Parish, Holyoke =

Coordinates: 42°12′36″N 72°36′23″W

Mater Dolorosa Parish
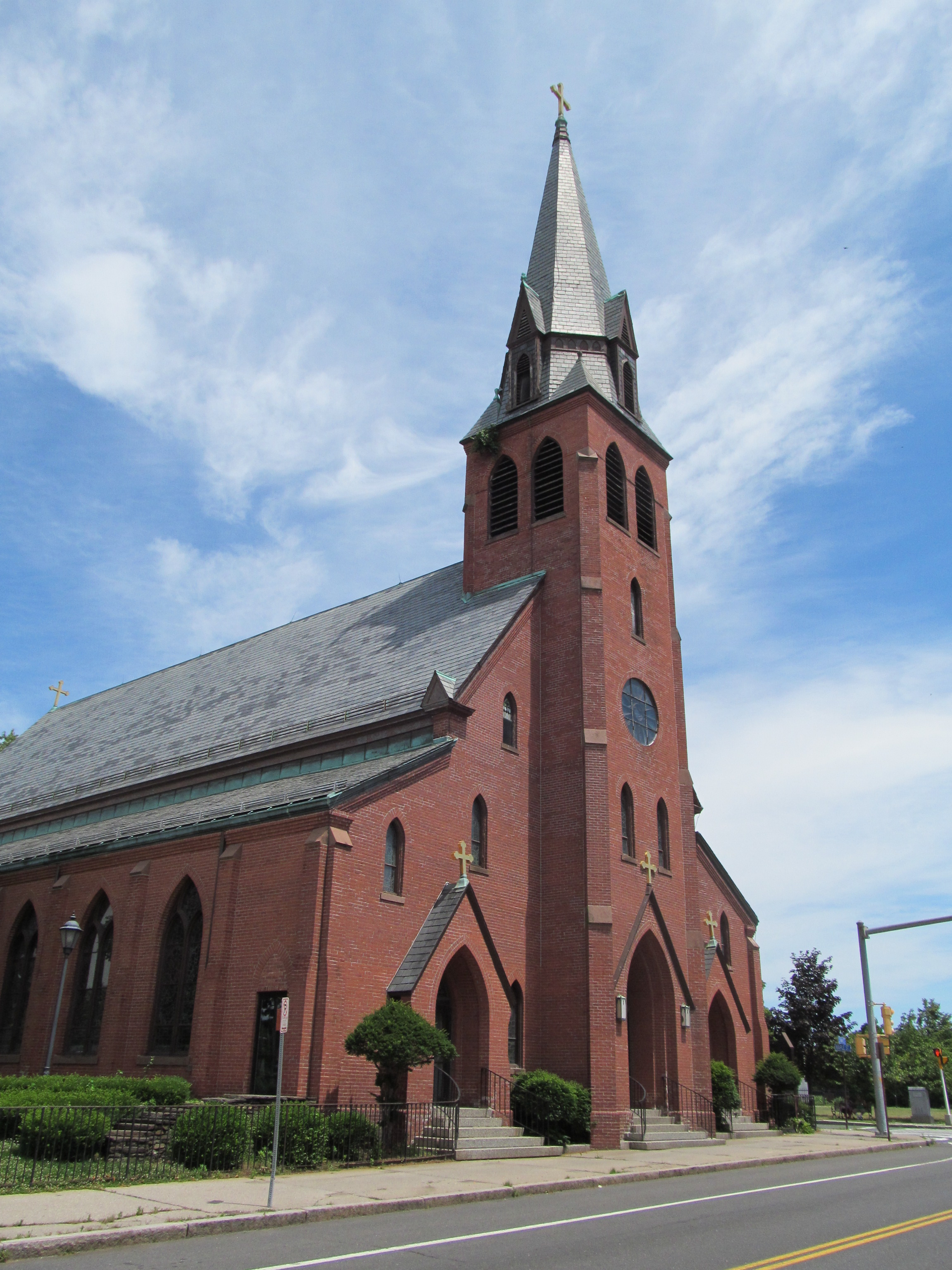
- Mater Dolorosa Parish
- Mater Dolorosa Parish
- Location: 71 Maple Street; Holyoke, Massachusetts
- Country: United States
- Denomination: Roman Catholic

History
- Founded: 1896
- Founder: Polish immigrants
- Dedication: Mater Dolorosa

Administration
- Division: Region 6
- Province: Boston
- Diocese: Springfield in Massachusetts
- Parish: Conventual Franciscans

Clergy
- Bishop: Most Rev. Timothy A. McDonnell
- Vicar: Fr. Stanley Sobiech OFM Conv
- Pastor: Fr. Alexander B Cymerman OFM Conv

Mater Dolorosa Parish was a Roman Catholic parish designated for Polish immigrants in Holyoke, Massachusetts, United States.

Founded 1896. It is one of the Polish-American Roman Catholic parishes in New England in the Diocese of Springfield in Massachusetts. The architect for this church was George P. B. Alderman of Holyoke, MA. According to the May 15, 2011 parish bulletin, the final mass was said on Sunday, June 26, 2011. "MD's" (as parishioners call it colloquially) merged with Holy Cross to form the new Our Lady of the Cross Parish.

== Closure and demolition ==
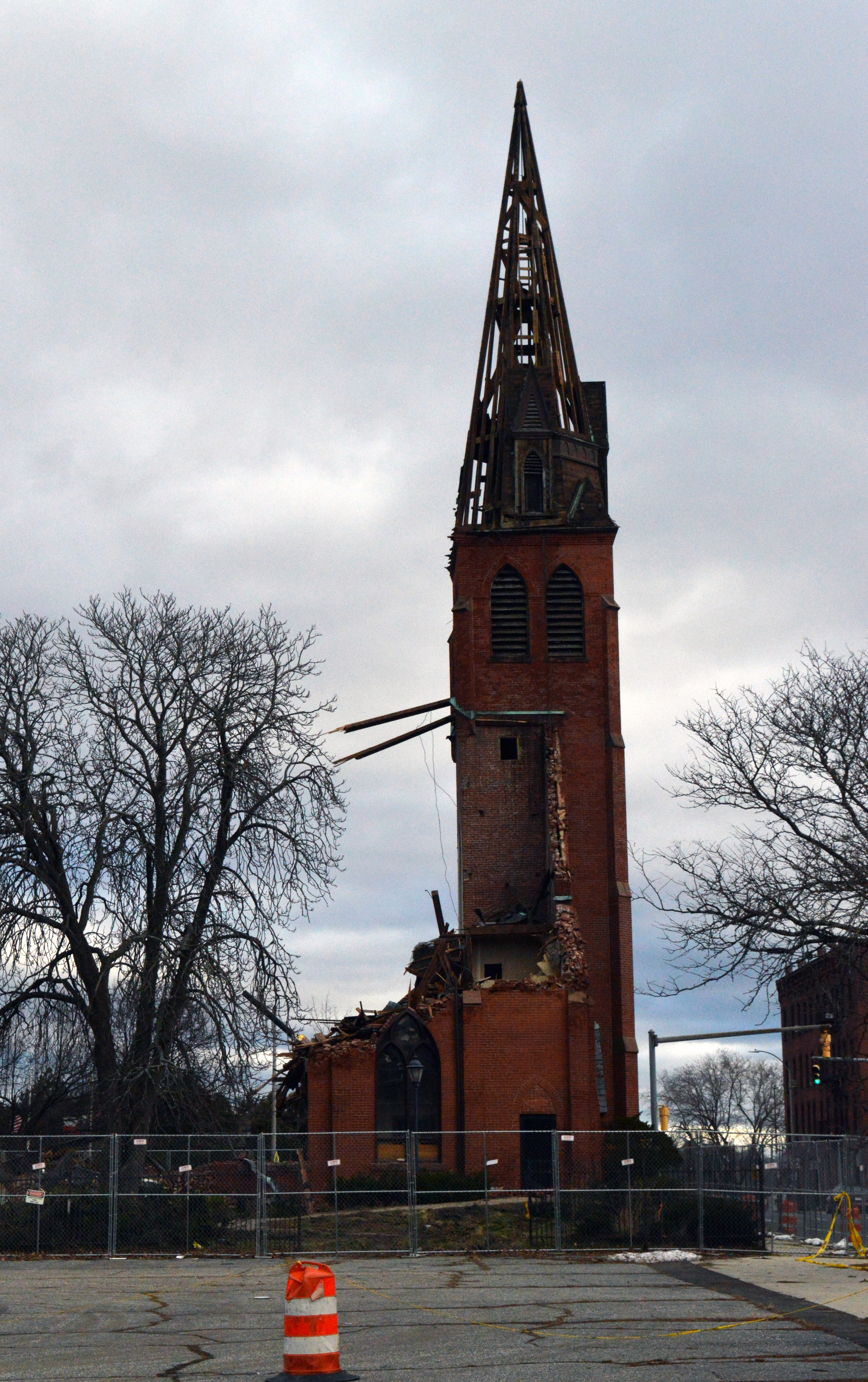
The steeple in December 2018, following demolition of the church's other elements; among reasons for closure cited by the diocese was concern that the steeple faced imminent collapse in 2011

The case of Mater Dolorosa Church is among the most egregious mismanagements of parish property by the Diocese of Springfield. Mater Dolorosa, one of the most beautiful churches in the diocese, was closed by Bishop Timothy McDonnell in 2011, as part of his "pastoral planning" (church closure) initiative. Though numerous attempts were made by parishioners to keep the parish open, their requests were repeatedly ignored by the Diocese, who had their own plans. The Diocese was set on closing the church and its victory over parishioners culminated in demolition of the 122-year-old church in 2018.

Among concerns cited by the diocese for the closure of the parish was reported concern that the steeple "could collapse at any time", noted by engineers that been hired by the church. In 2011 a number of former parish members, known as the Friends of Mater Dolorosa, organized a sit-in, and were taken to court by the diocese in an attempt to order them removed. Reviewing an engineering report provided by the protesters and those by the diocese, a Hampden Superior Court judge ruled "based on the evidence before me, I cannot conclude that condition of the steeple presents an emergency such that immediate court intervention is necessary".

An appeal was subsequently made to the Vatican to re-open the Parish. There was also on-going discussion of designating the area a historical district (Polish American), which would require that the building be maintained.

Briefly the diocese struck a deal with the city's Mayor Alex Morse, to purchase the building for $50,000 to be used for a transition program for school children with special needs. The diocese however would maintain ownership of parking as well as the stained glass, paintings, and any regalia in the former sanctuary, stating it was against church law to sell sacred objects, and only allowed use of the church's parking, not being sold, on a case-by-case basis pending approval of the building's use. Citing the month deadline given and an absence of negotiations allowed by the diocese, the city council unanimously rejected the purchase on June 28, 2018.

On December 11, 2018, immediately with the issuance of a demolition permit to the Diocese, the parish building was razed; although its stained glass was removed and sold at that time, the ornate painted panelling adorning its halls was not salvaged. Despite previous statements by a diocesan spokesman that it was against "universal church law" to sell sacred objects to non-church entities when negotiating with the city, on December 21, 2018, the Mater Dolorosa Preservation group reported finding the church's former stained glass for sale in a salvage shop in Minnesota.

== School ==
The former parish continues to operates a private school, Mater Dolorosa Catholic School (Grades PK-8).

== Discography ==
External audio
- Echoes of a Polish Christmas (32:28), E 1992, Rex Records

Several recordings of the Mater Dolorosa Church Choir were made by Rex Records, including but not limited to-

- Christmas, (1970) m.d. Records
- 80 Voices of Poland, Songs of Heritage, (c. 1980)
- Echoes Of A Polish Christmas, (1992)
- Ulubione Polskie Piosenki, "Favorite Polish Songs", (unknown)

== Bibliography ==
- The 150th Anniversary of Polish-American Pastoral Ministry. Webster, Massachusetts: St. Joseph Basilica. September 11, 2005.
- The Official Catholic Directory in USA
