= Dannin =

Dannin is a surname. Notable people with the surname include:

- Ellen Dannin (born 1951), American professor
- Leo Dannin (1898–1971), Danish footballer

== See also ==
- Danin (name)
- Dantin
