= Franco-American literature =

Body of work primarily from New England

Franco-American literature is a body of work, in English and French, by French-Canadian American authors "who were born in New England...born in Canada, [and] spent most of their lives in New England...[, or] those who only traveled through New England and wrote of their experiences." "Franco-American literature" however, as a term, has also been characterized by novels written by the Great Lakes Region diaspora as well. In a broader sense the term is also used as a handle for those writers of Cajun or French descent, outside of the Quebec émigré literary tradition.

Written in English as well as examples of Quebec and New England French, Franco-American literature and its associated literary and cultural movement represent an extension of La Survivance and Quebec literature among the French-Canadian diaspora in the New England region of the United States. In this literature, folklore, societal values and expressions of otherism are prominent motifs. While some literary figures, especially those of the Late 20th century Revival, sought to capture their own way of life within Yankee society, many earlier novels placed emphasis on the responsibilities of industry and craft, as well as fictionalized figures within Franco-American society.

== History ==
=== Exiles and the Great Migration ===
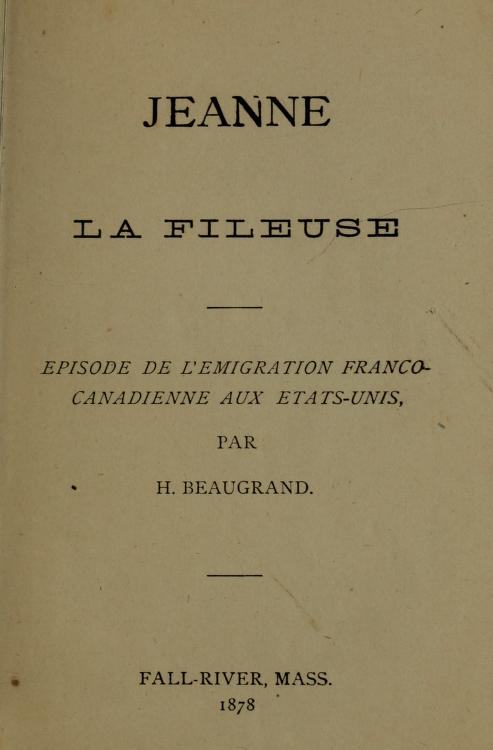
The title page of the first edition of Honoré Beaugrand's Jeanne La Fileuse: Episode de l'Emigration Franco-Canadienne aux États-Unis, widely considered to be the first notable novel in Franco-American literature

The earliest forms of Franco-American literature began with its journalists. In 1839 Ludger Duvernay published Le Patriote Canadien, as a political exile in Burlington, Vermont, to support the Patriote movement in neighboring Canada. However, it would not be until the height of the Great Migration that one such journalist, Honoré Beaugrand would publish what is widely considered the first Franco-American novel, Jeanne la Fileuse ("Jeanne the Spinner"). After stints as a journalist in St. Louis and New Orleans, Beaugrand founded La République in Fall River in 1875, by that time already a prominent figure in the French-Canadian cultural societies of that city. Sometime around 1877 he published Jeanne la Fileuse ("Jeanne the Spinner") as a serial novel (or feuilleton) in his weekly paper. Even among many other accomplishments, including writing down the French-Canadian folk legend of La Chasse-galerie, and his Montréal mayoralty, the Dictionary of Canadian Biography has described Beaugrand's novel as "his most important work". A social novel, it documented, in a secular tone, the "Grand Migration" from Quebec and living conditions of those who lived in the industrial cities of New England, depicting assimilation through its protagonist family attaining a certain affluence in the States. In many ways the novel was also a censure of the economics of Canada, whose government Beaugrand regarded as apathetic to the causes of agriculture and industry, unnecessarily creating conditions which led to the migration to New England. The novel enjoyed success on both sides of the border and was republished as a book by Beaugrand in 1878 before being reprinted serially in Montreal's La Patrie in 1880, seeing another reprint as a book by their own press in 1888.

Another of the earliest examples of Franco-American writing that meets the definition as American in subject, but Canadian in origins, was Un revenant, épisode de la Guerre de Sécession aux États-Unis ("A Ghost, Episode of the War of Secession in the United States"). Although unremarkable in its writing style, Rémi Tremblay's autobiographical novel represents a unique account of the American Civil War as seen through the eyes of a Québécois foreign national, enlisted in the Union Army.

=== Feuilleton era ===
By the end of the 19th century, French-language newspapers abounded in New England, and in their pages works of fiction were published in installments as serial novels. The term feuilleton, though more broadly used to describe a woman's section or supplementary column in French-language newspapers with non-political news, became synonymous with this type of fiction in the context Franco-American newspapers.

Rencontres et entretiens ("Meetings and Interviews") by Adélard Lambert contained vignettes of New England Franco-Americana, but despite its format was published as a book rather than initially as a feuilleton

What began with the first publishing of Jeanne de Fileuse soon became a trend as other novels (romans) would be published as feuilletons, in installments over weeks or months, with the most popular reprinted as books, oftentimes by the same press. One of the first woman to publish a feuilleton in the genre was Anna-Marie Duval-Thibault, whose novel Les Deux Testaments was structured as a French soap opera, but sought to capture the customs of the New World. Duval-Thibault would publish the feuilleton in her husband's Fall River newspaper L'Independente in 1888, noting in the paper's preface that the novel was inspired by a desire to contrast "the pens of French writers [which] offer us a picture of different customs unknown to most of our readers. When we are told about the great Parisian world, the life of the nobles or the tricksters of European capitals, we can barely grasp all the nuances and understand all the motives of these artificial beings. In Les Deux Testaments, on the contrary, we only see scenes from Canadian life; it is with us, with all that this work contains meaning and memories". (Note: Original in French: "trop souvent les feuilletons sortis de la plume d'écrivains français nous offrent une peinture de moeurs différentes sinon inconnues à la plupart de nos lecteurs. Quand on nous parle du grand monde parisien, de la vie des nobles ou des filous des capitales européennes, on peut à peine saisir toutes les nuances et comprendre tous les mobiles de ces êtres factices. Dans LES DEUX TESTAMENTS, au contraire, on ne voit que des scènes de la vie canadienne; c'est chez nous, avec tout ce que ce mot contient de signification et de souvenirs...") While this passage mentions "Canadian life" this, in part, refers to the diaspora in the United States, as Duvay-Thibault herself had lived outside Canada since the age of 3.

Among the best known of these early writers was one Louis Tesson, himself a newspaper publisher, who would go on to write three novels Le Sang Noir ("The Black Blood"), Une idylle acadienne ("An Acadian Idyll"), and Un Roman Sans Amour ("A Novel Without Love") in the 1890s, published in Lewiston, Maine's Le Messager. More famously Tesson would develop methods to broaden his audience by educating the community's illiterate using, le methode Tesson, a phonetic approach.

=== Interwar period ===
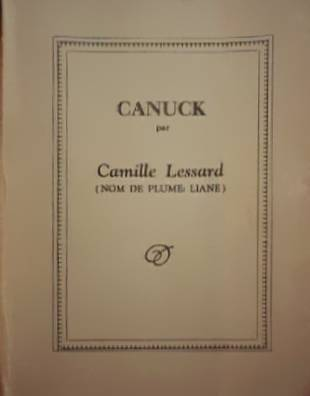
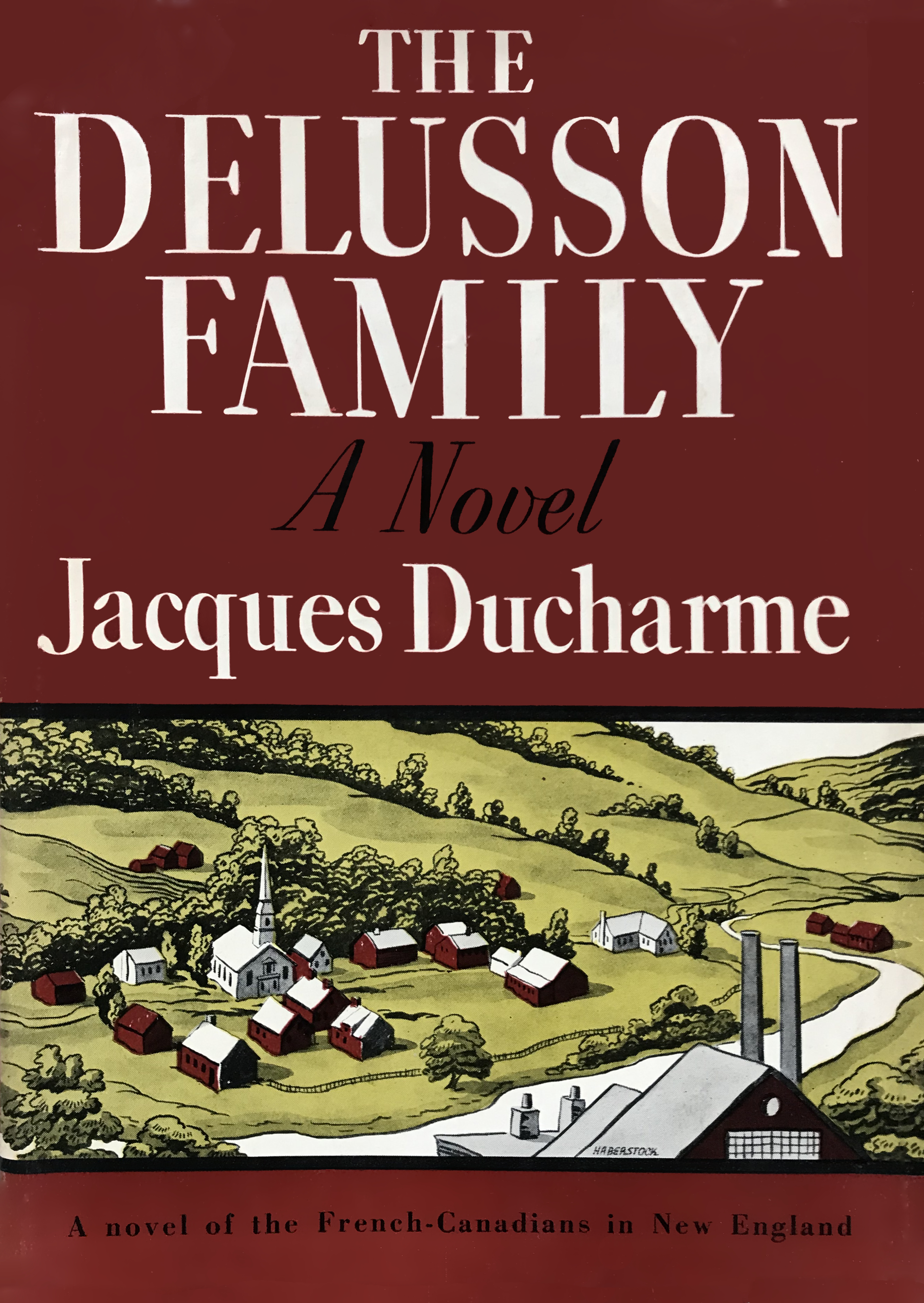
The first edition of Canuck (1936) by Camille Lessard, printed in book form by the newspaper, Lewiston's Le Messager, where it was first published as a feuilleton; first edition of The Delusson Family (1939) by Jacques Ducharme

The era between the two World Wars was notable not solely for its literature but also in its criticism thereof. With the support of the Université Laval, in 1946 Sister Mary-Carmel Therriault wrote the first comprehensive history of Franco-American literature, as well as related pieces including the history of New England French, its institutions, journals, publishers, poetry, biographies and folklore. Therriault's account however was not one of praise, and her history regarded the genre as a nascent literary movement by that time— an offshoot of Quebec literature lacking any solitary masterpiece.

By this time, there was increasing support for this diaspora community from those in Quebec. Although some had returned by then, there was an increasing representation both of Franco-American leaders of the church, and the press, in the bodies of Canadian Francophone institutions. One of the most prominent early examples was the Second Congress on the French Language in Canada, which included a committee for measures that could be taken to preserve La Survivance and the bilingual institutions of New England French.

At the end of the Second Congress, there was a proposal to create 12 regional committees in New England, to coordinate the best way to keep the culture alive, and maintain exchange with Quebec to maintain the French language and La Survivance as Franco-Americans. This effort was documented in a large tome called La Croisade Franco-Américaine ("The Franco-American Crusade") published at the end of the Congress with numerous proposals, poetry, and histories of the French-Canadians who had long embraced the identity of New Englanders.

One of the best known novels of the period would Canuck by Camille Lessard-Bissonette. Written in feuilleton form in 1936 for the French newspaper Le Messager of Lewiston, Maine and set in Lowell, Massachusetts, at the time of its publication, its author managed the paper's women's section "Chez-Nous". The feuilleton was subsequently published as a single volume and was so successful that a newspaper in Lawrence, Massachusetts, reprinted it the following year. The novel has been described as having a fundamental historical, sociological, and literary value.

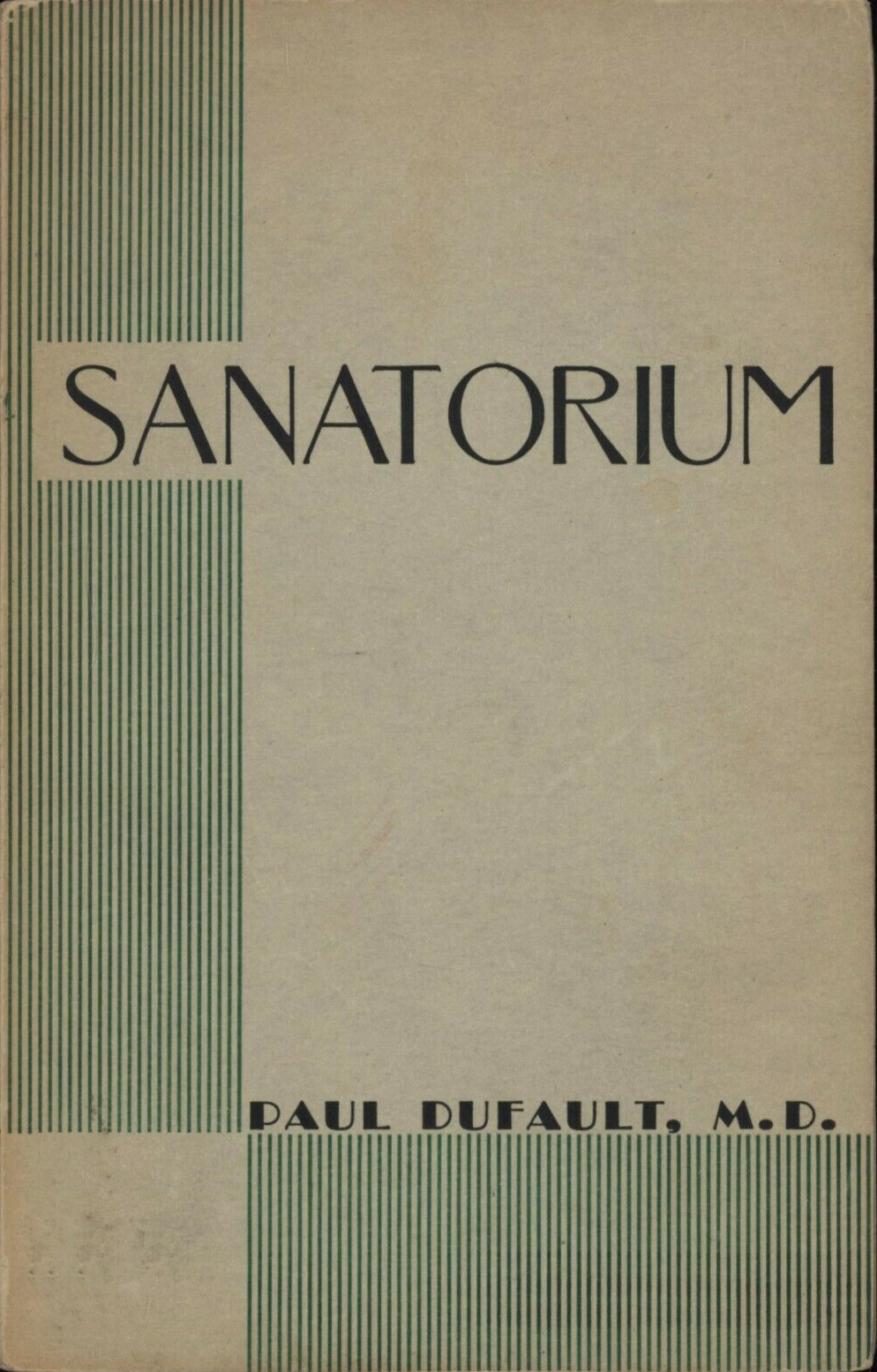
Cover of the original edition of Sanatorium, 1938, by Dr. Paul DuFault

Another example of the period that merited mention was Sanitorium by Dr. Paul Dufault. A fictionalized account of his own experiences, the novel, set in Rutland State Sanatorium in Rutland, Massachusetts, was described in Montreal's Le Jour as a "roman médical" (medical novel), the first of its kind to come out of the Franco-American diaspora, which would later find echos in this theme in novels like Robert Cormier's I Am the Cheese. However, in contrast to psychological institutions, Sanatorium finds protagonists in patients in a tuberculosis ward, a subject that its author knew well as a medical doctor, advocate, and former patient of the disease himself. Working at the first state sanatorium established solely for the purpose of treating the disease, and as the only Québécois member of its medical staff, he would write in English for the New England Journal of Medicine, and published the French-language novel at his own expense as a way to draw attention to the scourge both in the States and the Provinces. Besides its subject matter and setting, the novel is also unique in that its protagonist, Dr. Lanoie, in his dialogue, reflects on the issues of social questions in both Quebec and the United States, describing the work of medicine as literally and metaphorically "l'œuvre de reconstruction".

In the years after Canuck, a shift began to take place toward printing novels in English, and indeed even with greater institutional support of French, a period of about 50 years commenced where subsequent novels were written entirely in English. Some exceptions to this, like Sanatorium in 1938, and Les Enfances de Fanny by Louis Dantin, do exist, but both volumes represented a departure from émigré literature. Both works were printed in Quebec and intended for audiences in the provinces and in the states. Dantin himself, though identified with collections of Franco-American poetry, famously regarded himself as a Quebec literary figure, and rejected the idea of Franco-American literature as a genre. This novel, posthumously published in 1951, was thoroughly American in subject, reflecting his own social and cultural integration living in Boston even as he continued to publish out of Canadian printing houses. His audience too was originally American in scope, as he had initially planned to publish the novel as a feuilleton in a Boston Haitian-American newspaper, following the establishment of a committee of Francophones between Canada and the island nation. Dantin however saw the novel as too controversial for the time, as its subject matter concerned a black woman from the South who settles in Roxbury and falls in love with a young Frenchman who she works for as a housekeeper. Dantin would also include a number of references to specific black nationalist movements which existed at the time, however felt the interracial romance was too controversial for either Haitian or a Franco-American audiences at that time. The book fits in a uniquely American novel written thematically, written in the French language by an author who considered himself an outsider to America's Yankee society.

Unfortunately the Second World War and changes in mass media, as well as the eventual Quiet Revolution overshadowed American efforts in French-language preservation. While Vivian Parson's Lucien would precede Jacques Ducharme's The Delusson Family by months, by the New England definition, the latter would be the first in Franco-American literature to be both nationally distributed and written in English. Its author's Franco history book Shadows of the Trees was also, controversially, written in English, something that became commonplace in the next generation which sought to reconcile their American identities. Written in a spiral narrative structure, The Delusson Family followed a Quebec family as they moved to Holyoke and their stories in adapting to a predominantly Irish and Yankee English society. Both fellow Franco-American writer Rosaire Dion-Lévesque and Kerouac biographer Maurice Poteet, would later cite The Delusson Family as a likely influence of Jack Kerouac's debut novel The Town and the City. Though never explicitly confirmed, Poteet would note– "[t]he influence of Jacques Ducharme's novel, The Delusson Family, is however less hypothetical. In fact, The Town and the City can be read as its extension, as a variant of the same genre. Although the daily routine of the Delussons distinguish this story from the climate of anguish and alienation that reigns among the Martins of Kerouac, certain elements of Ducharme's novel suggest that it may have inspired Kerouac." (Note: Original in French: "L'influence du roman de Jacques Ducharme, The Delusson Family, est cependant moins hypothétique. En fait, The Town and the City peut se lire comme son extension, comme une variante du même genre. Quoique la routine quotidienne des Delusson distingue ce récit du climat d'angoisse et d'aliénation qui règne chez les Martin de Kerouac, certains éléments du roman de Ducharme suggèrent qu'il a pu inspirer Kerouac.") The comparison between Ducharme and Kerouac's protagonist families was striking enough that Kerouac biographer Barry Miles would also cite Poteet's comparison in his own work. Kerouac however would choose to explore the bohemian dynamic of one of his protagonists far more than the American influence found in Ducharme's, setting the tone for the next generation of Franco-American authors after the Second World War.

=== Third generation and assimilation ===
By the end of the Second World War, a number of social factors had disrupted Franco-American life, and ergo its literature. Families as a unit saw greater dysfunction during the war, and by the end of the 1940s, saw divorces in 2/3 of those whose men returned from the war, something previously almost unprecedented in Franco-American marriages. This followed greater trends in apostasy and intermarriage with a rejection of the community's values, as well as an embrace of Anglicized names as White Americans. A period of monolinguism emerged; while New England French endured in the regional poetry of the era, the most successful Franco-American novels were entirely in English and generally stood as rejections of la survivance, emphasizing a traumatic postwar acculturation.

In his treatise on Franco-American literature, Armand Chartier, an ethnic literature scholar, described Jean-Louis "Jack" Kerouac as having a "tragically divided cultural identity", and described his most explicitly Franco-American works as The Town and the City (1950), Doctor Sax (1959), Visions of Gerard (1963), and Satori in Paris (1966). Indeed, while Kerouac has been described as the most famous Franco-American author by some, during his lifetime he underwent a prolonged alienation between his success and his self-identified ethnic roots. Although he would become identified with the "Beat Generation" as a literary movement, with the limited success of his first novel The Town and the City, Kerouac would receive praise in the March 23, 1950 issue of Le Travailleur, from one Yvonne Le Maître, one of the New England Francophone community's most distinguished journalists and critics, who had previously served as a foreign correspondent for The Smart Set, Boston Evening Transcript, and The New Yorker in Paris. Kerouac was so moved by her largely-positive reception that he wrote her back a letter describing the influence of his Franco-American upbringing on his writing–

"I never spoke English before I was 6 or 7. At 21 I was still somewhat awkward and illiterate in speech and writing. The reason I handled English words so easily is because it is not my own language. I refashion it to fit French images."

Although he wouldn't characterize his writing with the handle "Franco-American literature", in later years Kerouac both embraced the Beat Generation handle, and its parallels with the hippie movement, but what he perceived as a corruption of his own view of the "Beats". In an inebriated 1968 interview with William F. Buckley Jr., Kerouac would proclaim to be in favor of law and order, lamenting he believed his own writing had been co-opted by allies of Allen Ginsberg and Lawrence Ferlinghetti as well as a communist-sympathetic press, stating he did not identify as a communist but wrote as a Catholic, and that he originally would describe the term "Beat" as deriving of the qualities of "the blessed" described in Beatitudes. In 2007 Ferlinghetti himself would also assert that without Ginsberg, there would have been no Beat Generation in concept, but rather Kerouac and his contemporaries may have been described in discrete contexts. During his life Kerouac would also use his fame to interview in French with outlets like Radio-Canada, commenting extensively on the work of authors like Louis-Ferdinand Céline and his Journey to the End of the Night.

Several miles from Lowell where Kerouac dwelled, up the Merrimac River, hailed Marie Grace DeRepentigny of Manchester, New Hampshire. Born to a broken home, and living in poverty for most of her life, she was to become best known by her married name, Grace Metalious. Though of Franco origins, her famous succès de scandale, Peyton Place, did not so explicitly address a rejection of Franco-American life and values as did her 1967 novel No Adam in Eden. The former however was by far her most famous and contemporarily was described as an American novel rather than an example of ethnic literature. By some metrics it became the bestselling American novel up until that time, selling 9.6 million copies in its first decade on shelves.

Though her books were successful, they were also seen as a scandal in themselves for their debaucherous and taboo themes, depicting premarital sex and adultery, standing in contrast with Catholic traditions and other works of La Survivance. While Metalious sought to distance herself from her ethnic upbringing, in recent years, her work has been embraced in the context of her heritage by groups like the Franco-American Women's Institute in Brewer, Maine. In her most famous work, Metalious offered no praise for the Franco community's Catholicism, made no mention of La belle province, the French-language, or any of its associated cultural institutions. In her latter work, No Adam in Eden, Metalious would however draw more from her heritage, albeit in the same negative light. Despite a posthumous embrace of her work by other literary critics, in his paper on Kerouac and Metalious as Franco-American authors, history professor Richard Sorrell summed Metalious's views as–

In effect, No Adam in Eden says there is no hope within one's nationality but it is equally useless to try to rise outside of the group. This life which she led showed that such advice was no more useful in reality than in fiction. Francos may take heart, at least, from the fact that her unhappiness seemed more a function of deficiencies in her ethnic rearing than the inevitable result of trying to maintain survivance in New England.

Echoing in some ways the motifs of Ducharme's The Delusson Family, Gérard Robichaud's Papa Martel represented a departure from the melancholic overtones of the mainstream authors of this era. A series of English-language short stories that have since been described as definitive Maine literature, Papa Martel portrays the Franco-American family as accommodating, between French-Canadian Habitant culture and the assimilative influence of postwar America. Though never attaining national fame, the book was widely successful in New England, particularly Maine. In 1985 it would be adapted into a play by the Lewiston-based Maine Acting Company, and in 2000 the Baxter Literary Society of Portland named it one of the state's 100 most influential books. Similarly, though less famous or fictional, was the 1954 As I Live and Dream by Gertrude Coté; a memoir of family history which enjoyed success in her native Maine, it was also written in English, accessible to wider audience.

During this period, the French language was absent in New England's published works, and by the 1960s, assimilation and anti-French laws had begun to reduce its prevalence. Though there remained ongoing efforts to maintain bilingualism within government bodies like Maine's Department of Education, even as an asset, ultimately with the decline of the French press and consolidation of media, such efforts saw little success.

=== Revival era and contemporary works ===
While the third generation of Franco-American authors had in some sense finally reached a national audience outside the trappings of literary regionalism, it had become removed from its source material, and bilingualism had, for several decades, given way solely to English. Remarking on the rarity of novels in French and how long it had been since anything but French poetry had been added, one literary critic later remarked "[t]he harvest is rather lean and interspersed with worrying years of famine, a phenomenon that can be explained in large part by the obstacles to be overcome in order to edit works in French in the United States." In an increasingly centralized mass media environment, the private market for French-language publishing in New England had eroded considerably, and only a handful of publishers remained of the dozens of newspapers which once abounded. For this reason the Franco-American literature of the period went in two different directions. Those who had acculturated into the American mainstream built on the legacy of the third generation in English, such as critically-acclaimed author Robert Cormier and his successful young adult novels, The Chocolate War and I Am the Cheese.

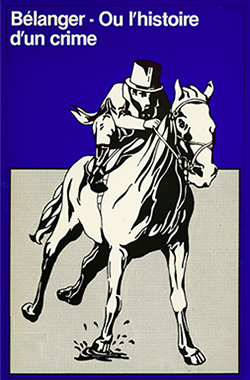
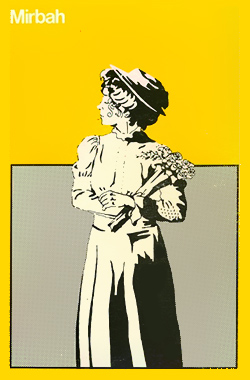
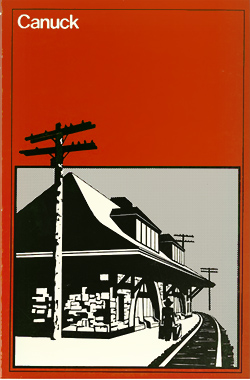
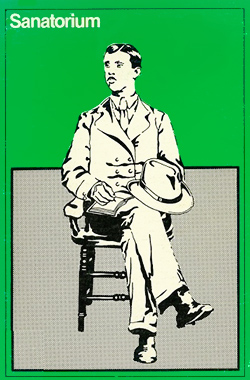
Examples of novels republished by the National Materials Development Center for French and Creole, as a part of the United States Department of Health, Education, and Welfare's bilingual education programs. Left to right: Bélanger– Ou l'histoire d'un crime by Georges Crépeau, Mirbah by Emma Dumas, Canuck by Camille Lessard, and Sanatorium by Dr. Paul DuFault.

However the 1970s and 1980s would see a brief revival in bilingual Franco-American literature thanks to federal support in education. In 1974 Congress amended the Elementary and Secondary Education Act (ESEA) to include an expanded mandate for bilingual education, which included the funding of what would ultimately become 14 regional "material development centers", creating textbooks and other volumes to further expand on language classes in public schools. Among these was the National Materials Development Center for French and Creole, (Note: Also sometimes referred to as the National Development Center for French and Portuguese) based out of Bedford and subsequently Manchester, New Hampshire. From 1975 until 1982, Franco-American literature was made available to a new generation through a number of reprints of novels individually, particularly from the feuilleton era, as well as the development of textbooks like A Franco-American Overview, which included history of French Americans both in New England as well as across the United States in eight volumes. Similarly the group would also print Richard Santerre's compiled Anthologie de la littérature franco-américaine de la Nouvelle-Angleterre ("Anthology of the Franco-American Literature of New England"), which would include fictional works by Honoré Beaugrand, Louis Dantin, Rosaire Dion-Lévesque, Edouard Fecteau, Camille Lessard-Bissonnette, Yvonne Le Maître, Emma Dumas, and Anna Duval-Thibault, among others. Funded through the US Department of Education's Office of Bilingual Education, the NMDC continued to be a publishing house of Franco-American works until 1982, when changes in federal expenditures ultimately forced it to close. Among the last works of the National Materials Development Center, was the 1983 publication of L'Heritage by Robert Perreault. The first French-language Franco-American novel written in the United States in half a century, working with the theme of revival, the novel takes place during the late 1960s at the height of the Vietnam War, and is centered on a female protagonist reconnecting with her cultural heritage through her grandmother's belongings. Though not in pursuit of a degree, Perrault's work would be subsequently described as a "thesis novel", revisiting earlier themes of ethnic identity within the ideals of Americanism. While the NMDC had been defunded by the time of Perreault's work, the University of New Hampshire would ultimately make available resources to allow its staff and publishers to continue for some period following its defunding.

More recent authors like Robert Cormier, John Dufresne, Ernest Hébert, Dorianne Laux, Howard Frank Mosher, Cathie Pelletier, David Plante, Annie Proulx are among those of the contemporary era whose work spans the genre, with branching out into more universal themes, and others drawing on the influence of previous authors in the genre's literary tradition examining Americanism and identity.

== Motifs ==
A common motif across virtually all Franco-American novels until those of the contemporary era, was la survivance. In her history of Franco-American literature, Sister Marie-Carmel Therriault noted the French language appeared in some regard as a character in its own right: a language protected by those of exiles who live in harmony with Quebec, mainly journalists involved in the struggle for the promotion and survival of the French in North America. Some of the subject matter focuses on specifically the issues facing Franco-Americans as a group, while other volumes offered more personal anecdotes. Therriault however would also lament that the collective nature of the genre up through the Interwar period was also to its detriment– "[These works contain] few or no crises of heart; the intimate drama has no place. The heroes seek above all to acclimatize to a new kind of life, that of the immigrant in American land." (Note: Original in French: Peu ou point de crises d'âmes; le drame intime n'y a pas sa place. Les héros cherchent avant tout à s'acclimater à un nouveau genre de vie, celui de l'émigré en terre américaine.) Reacting positively to the fame of the melancholic Kerouac and Metalious, Papa Martel author Gérard Robichaud later remarked that, above all, Franco-American writers, should stop repeating the same themes in their works, among others, of emigration and assimilation, to deal more with universal themes, while retaining a certain ethnic perspective.

While Jeanne la Fileuse was a social novel of its day, discussing the issues of labor and class, the Franco-American novel has also typified the historical novel both in regional and national contexts. Examples include Mirbah, set during the Precious Blood Church fire, as well as the Civil War novel, Un Revenant, and the revivalist L'Heritage, depicting the attitudes of American youth during the Vietnam War.

Some other examples of divergent attitudes found between Franco-American and Yankee or Anglo-American literature include contrasts such as the following from taken from Vivian Parsons's Lucien-

Category	Franco-American	Anglo-American
Religion	Social dominance by church	No dominance by church but Protestant work ethic
Historical Perspective	Explorers; dispossessed diaspora	Pioneers; institutional founders
Orientation to Tasks	The means, the process	The goal, its completion
Personal Identity	Collectivistic/Familial	Individualistic
Relation to Nature	Accepting/Harmonizing	Mastering/Dominating
Public Self	Exuberant	Restrained/Relaxed
Political Tradition	Union of Church and State	Separation of Church and State
Attitude to Work	Work is "personal" and an ongoing duty	Work is toward gains and achievement

== Critiques ==
=== Absence in literary markets ===
While bilingual counterparts of Latino literature have, in time, been able to capitalize on their position as a culture of others, as well as find a literary market which embraced their otherism, in contrast, with the exception of Jeanne de Fileuse across borders, the genre's first counterpart, few Franco-American novels have truly found place in literature that transcended their place of origin. In contrast, those who did, such as Jack Kerouac or Grace Metalious, and later Cathie Pelletier and Robert Cormier, did so as part of other literary movements— distinct from Franco-American literature but clearly shaped by it. In his work on the genre as a whole critic Armand Chartier noted that although Kerouac's work, for example, was shaped by "his French-Catholic upbringing...to an astonishing degree", however he noted "even [Kerouac's] journeys betray the coureur de bois, the French-Canadian version of the eternally restless nomad." In contrast with Chartier's opinions of Kerouac and Papa Martel's author Gérard Robichaud, during a conference on Franco-American literature, Robichaud lauded the work of Jack Kerouac, noting he was able to carve out an international reputation for himself by demonstrating an openness of mind in his writings, going beyond solely the theme of survivance. Indeed, up until the Third Generation, Franco-American literature focused less on characters and more on the documented collective, with Sister Carmel noting in her critical history that most such novels through the Interwar Period dwelled the study of the life of the regional communities in social novels, rather than the struggles of protagonists.

Ultimately, most examples of Franco-American literature represented American literary regionalism with some exceptions. Funk and Wagnall's would pick up Jacques Ducharme's The Delusson Family in 1939, the first Franco-American novel in English, and the first published for a national audience. Though never earning enough to financially sustain its author, it proved to be a modest success as a selection of the Catholic Book Club of the Jesuit magazine America. At the time of its publication however, Ducharme noted those at his publisher Harper, in New York City, were completely unaware of a French presence, in language or culture, in New England, despite being within a morning's drive of numerous Franco-American institutions. Another early example in the broader definition of the genre was Lucien by Vivian Parsons, set in Michigan and published months before Ducharme's work by Dodd, Mead & Co. Decades later Doubleday would allow Robichaud's Papa Martel to go out of print for several decades, but the book would remain popular in the culture of Maine and was later named one of 100 most influential Maine books by the Baxter Literary Society of Portland in 2000.

Despite being an ethnic and linguistic minority, by 1943 historian and writer Jacques Ducharme amassed a library of 400 books written and published by Franco-Americans, including nearly 50 volumes of poetry and prose, however the fact that the population, including its writers, represented millworkers, meant they were not tied to the literary world in caste nor conventions. While writing his dissertation on the subject of Franco-American novels, historian Richard Santerre noted there were few examples of many titles that were publicly available, with some like Duval-Thibault's Les Deux Testaments having sole examples extant in private collections. With many feuilleton titles being solely in French-language newspapers or paperback pamphlets, few copies of the genre remained in circulation, even while records of their titles remain known today. While Santerre and the NMDC would attempt to rectify this by republishing a number of rare volumes through the 1970s, because of their educational mission rather than commercial, many of the genre's foundational works, including those in Santerre's 9-volume anthologie never saw nationwide distribution.

=== Relation to New England and Quebec literature ===
"Franco-American literature" has been differentiated from Yankee New England literature, and Quebec literature by some definitions, but contradictorily is a term which intersects with both. In the 20th century, some of the earliest opinions of critics remained divided on whether such works could be considered their own genre. The French-Canadian writer Louis Dantin, living in Boston for years while publishing literature in Quebec, would once simply posit "there is no Franco-American literature and there never will be." There was some shift in Dantin's attitude in his later years, but only to a point. In reviewing The Delusson Family in the July 1939 issue of Le Jour, Dantin would use the term "Franco-American" to frame the novel, but would also ask of author Jacques Ducharme, "has he come to the point of taking part in the intellectual life, in the literature of his adopted soil?" (Note: Original in French: "En est-il arrivé au point de prendre part à la vie intellectuelle, à la littérature de son sol adoptif?") And even as Ducharme was criticized as a traitor for writing his debut volume in English, he would recount pessimistically in French before a conference of the Société Historique Franco-Américaine— "Let us count our poets today. I know four or five. Our novelists. There are not any. Historians, yes, there are, but so far no one has dared to write a general history of Franco-Americans. It is always local history that concerns us, as well as French Canadians..." (Note: Original in French: "Que faisons-nous? Nous végétons. Nous dormons sur nos lauriers. Je ne parle pas des écoles, mais plutôt de notre vie artistique et littéraire. Comptons nos poètes d'aujourd'hui. J'en connais quatre ou cinq. Nos romanciers. Il n y en a pas. Historiens, oui, il y en a, mais jusqu'ici personne ne s'est avisé de faire une histoire générale des Franco-Américains. C'est toujours l'histoire locale qui nous préoccupe, ainsi que les Canadiens français...")

To some degree, Franco-Americans embraced French-Canadian folklore, including Jos Montferrand, whose story included a purported stint working for the Amoskeag Manufacturing Company of Manchester, and whose name was also synonymous with strength among émigrés as it was in Québec; to say one was strong through the mid-20th century was to say "C'est un Jos Montferrand." Honoré Beaugrand, who would spend his formative literary years in New England, is not only credited for the first Franco novel, but later wrote the best-known version of La Chasse-galerie. Nevertheless, Franco-American literary tastes, particularly those of the late 19th and early 20th century, were in some ways influenced by France more than Canada, as Jacques Ducharme would note–

All this [cultural propaganda from France] had its salutary effect, however, for it brought the Franco-Americans back to the source of their genius— France. Relations with Canada had been largely those of family and friends. French-Canadian literature never enjoyed any great vogue in New England; if one consults the feuilletons in newspapers, this is plainly shown, for the majority are by French authors. Only French-Canadian poetry made any impression on the émigrés.

Some works have been embraced by critics and proponents of the handle; the first "roman franco-américain" Jeanne de fileuse was one of the few to transcend cultural boundaries both a seminal work in Quebec literature for its author and the foundation of the Franco-American novel for its place of publication and subject matter. In more recent decades the novel has been viewed less as the social commentary it represented at the time of its writing, but rather as a defining piece of literature in the debate of what Franco-American literature is and is not— whether Franco literature is simply an extension of Quebec literature or a genre distinct in its own. In some cases the works of Franco-American authors would depict the emigration to New England as temporary. In The Delusson Family, there is a sense of permanency, while in Mill Village the respective family of the novel returns to Quebec. Another prominent example of overlap between the two genres also include books like Thirty Acres (Trente arpents), considered one of the most influential romans du terror ("rural novels") in Quebec literature, it is also a commentary on the industrialization of New England. The son of its protagonist abandons the family's thirty acres of farmland to seek a new life working in textile mills in America, and ultimately expresses doubts as to the ability for such Québecois identities to remain in the country's Little Canadas, standing in contrast with the optimism of Canuck and Jeanne la Fileuse. Critics have also differentiated pre-World War II Franco-American literature as an extension of Quebec literature for their focus on La Survivance, while a general departure from this has been noted in post-war literature, as well as the use of English rather than French, while Quebec literature is, by its own definition, French-language literature.

In New England literature, the French remained excluded to a degree in a way the Irish initially were, as Catholics, and ergo outsiders not allowed into Protestant institutions for generations. While Franco-American literature has been included in bibliographies of New England literature, numerous portrayals of Francophones in Anglo literature would depict them with certain derision. Vermont author Rowland Robinson would make such characters stereotypes of cowardice, with an inability to regard themselves as Americans. Similarly in his Yankee classic, Spiked Boot, novelist Robert E. Pike would depict Franco-Americans as deferent to any authority and docile, lacking initiative. In contrast, while Henry David Thoreau indeed bears a surname that is French, his ancestry was that of Huguenots, and thus he was of New England's Protestant culture and thus New England literature. A New England author of French descent, but not a figure of the Franco-American literary movement. In contrast Huguenot-descended New England author Sarah Orne Jewett expressed a certain solidarity with her Catholic neighbors, featuring a Franco-American family, the Bowdens, in her most notable work The Country of the Pointed Firs. While she portrays the family as having Americanized and speaking the New England English vernacular of Maine, their customs, as well as those of Mrs. Captain Tolland in her story The Foreigner (1900) are unmistakably Catholic and Franco-American.

== Notable works ==
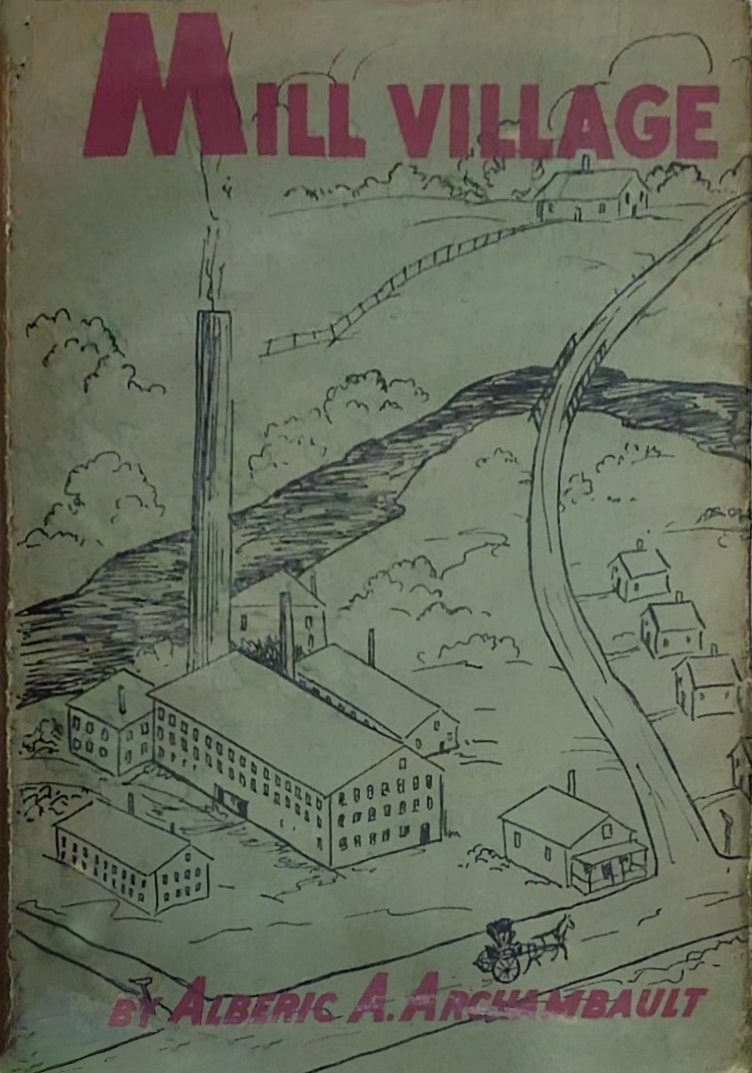
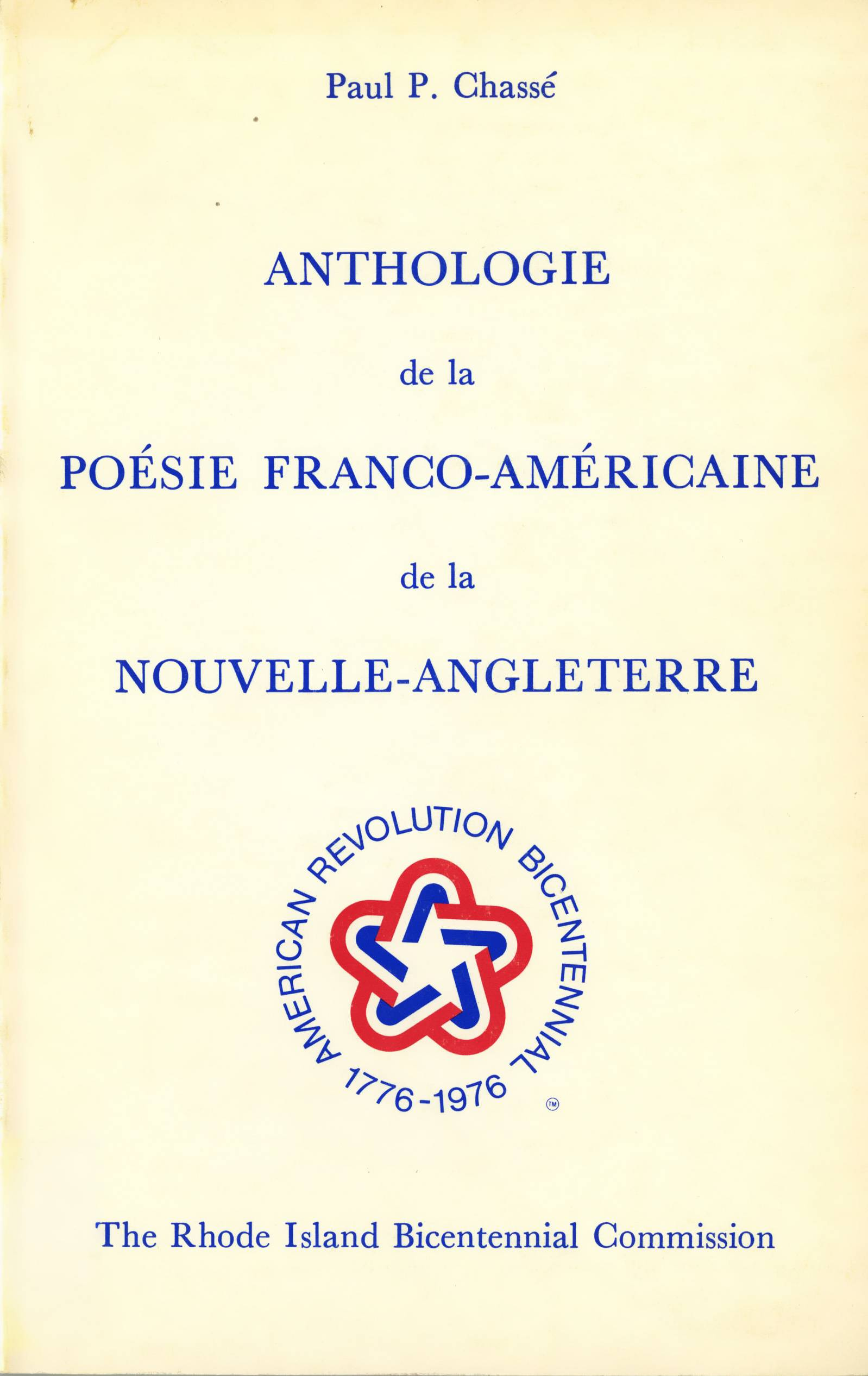
Left to right: Cover of the first edition of Mill Village, by Alberic A. Archambault; Anthologie de la poésie Franco-Américaine de la Nouvelle-Angleterre, compiled by Paul Chassé for the American Bicentennial, it represents the most complete collection of Franco-American poetry, with numerous examples in New England French

Although lesser-known feuilletons and novels abound, a number of novels of both American and Canadian origin, published initially in French and subsequently in English, have consistently characterized the handle "Franco-American literature".

Title	Author	Year	Language
Jeanne la fileuse	Honoré Beaugrand	1875 (Note: The first Franco-American novel in the post-migration era, printed serially in La République in Fall River, Massachusetts; published as a separate volume in 1878.)	French
Un revenant	Rémi Tremblay	1884	French
Mirbah	Emma Dumas	1910 (Note: Originally published serially in La Justice in Holyoke, Massachusetts under the nom de plume "Emma Port-Joli".)	French
Canuck	Camille Lessard-Bissonnette	1936	French
Sanatorium	Paul Dufault	1938	French
The Delusson Family	Jacques Ducharme	1939	English
Mill Village	Albéric A. Archambault	1943	English
The Town and the City	Jack Kerouac	1950	English
Les Enfances de Fanny	Louis Dantin	1951	French
Peyton Place	Grace Metalious	1956	English
Papa Martel	Gérard Robichaud	1961	English
The Family	David Plante	1978	English
Where the Rivers Flow North	Howard Frank Mosher	1978	English
L'Héritage	Robert B. Perreault	1983	French

== See also ==
- Quebec literature
- New England literature
- Literature of Louisiana
- History of the Franco-Americans
- New England French
