= Nelligan =

Nelligan may refer to:

- Nelligan (electoral district), a provincial electoral district in Quebec, Canada
- Nelligan (film), a Canadian drama film
- Nelligen, New South Wales, a village in New South Wales, Australia

== People with the surname ==
- David Neligan (1899–1983)
- Émile Nelligan (1879–1941), Quebec poet
- James Nelligan (born 1929), former US politician member of the United States House of Representatives
- Kate Nelligan (born 1950), Canadian actress
