= Jacques Ducharme =

American novelist

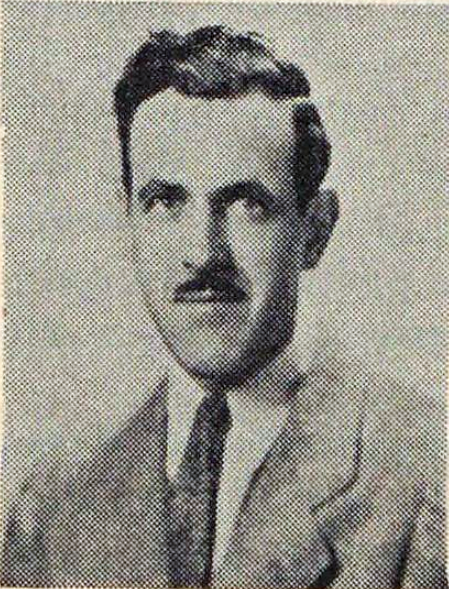
- Jacques Ducharme, circa 1948
- Born: Jacques Armand Ducharme; June 29, 1910; Holyoke, Massachusetts, U.S.
- Died: December 30, 1993 (aged 83); Hartford, Connecticut, U.S.
- Education: Assumption College
- Occupations: Novelist; historian; editor
- Spouse: Marguerite Delage (m. 1940)
- Children: 2
- Writing career
- Period: 1939–1993
- Notable works: The Delusson Family; The Shadows of the Trees
- Literary movement: Franco American; American literary regionalism
- Military career
- Allegiance: United States of America (1944-5)
- Branch: Office of Strategic Services

Jacques Armand Ducharme (June 29, 1910 – December 30, 1993) was an American novelist, copy editor, and historian of French Canadian ancestry who wrote The Delusson Family, the first nationally distributed Franco American novel, and the first of the genre published in English, as well as The Shadows of the Trees, one of the first English-language history books covering the Great Migration of émigrés from Quebec to New England, and their history in that part of the United States.

== Early life ==
Jacques Ducharme was born in Holyoke, Massachusetts to Pierre Honoré Tetreault-Ducharme and Malvina Katie Proulx, on June 29, 1910. His father was a millworker born in Saint-Valérien, Quebec, while his mother was descended from Nicholas Proulx (French: [pʁu]), the French-Canadian laborer first responsible for bringing Québécois laborers to Holyoke. Growing up in Holyoke, he attended the parish school of Notre-Dame du Perpetual Secours, receiving a bilingual education which he would continue as a student at Assumption College in Worcester, graduating with a Bachelor of Arts in 1932.

== Journalist and writer ==
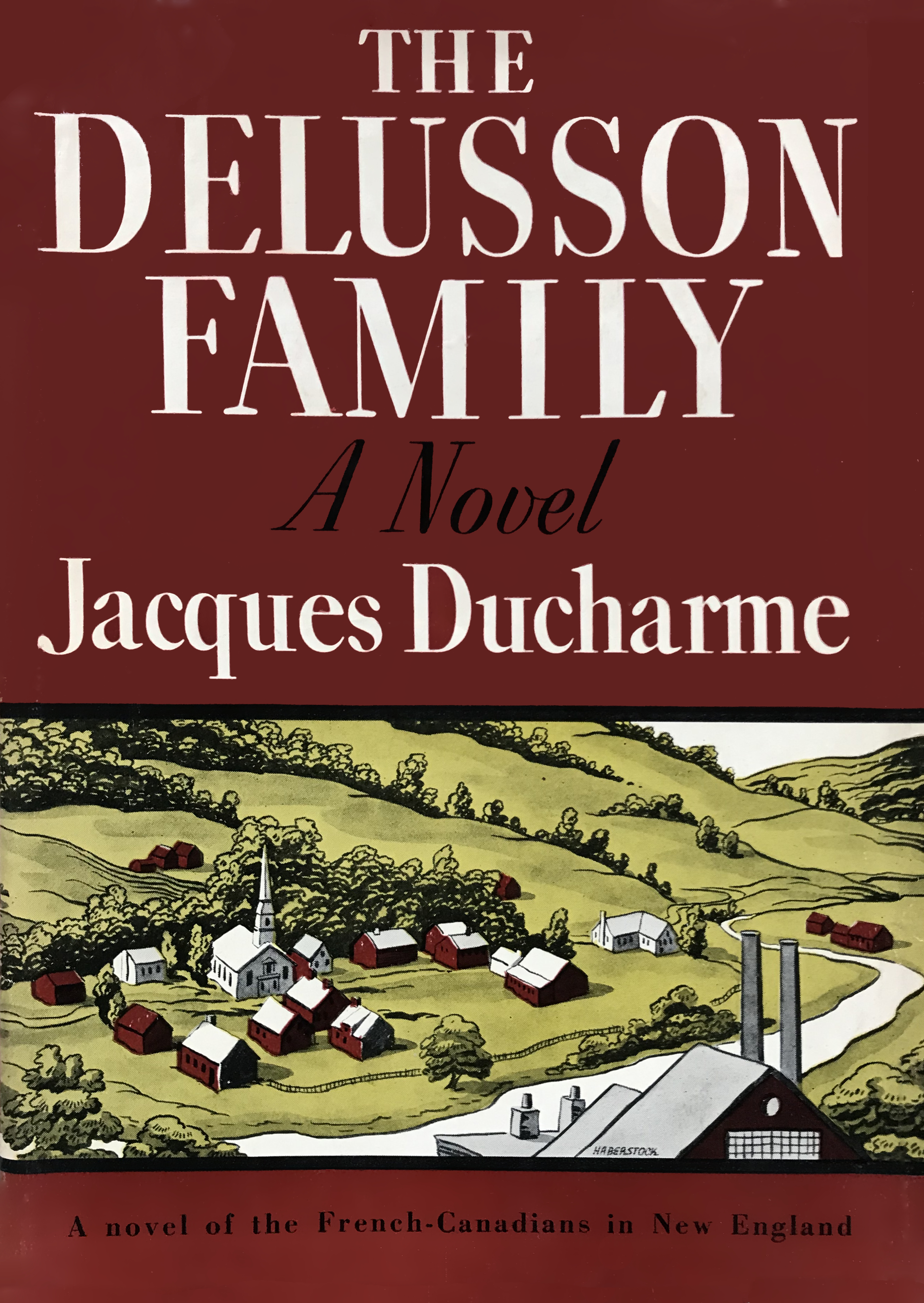
First edition of The Delusson Family, 1939

After leaving Assumption, Ducharme would go to study at Sorbonne in Paris, beginning a career as a freelance writer, editor and teacher, a career he would keep after returning to States. Upon returning he would audit some additional course Trinity College and Harvard, and began writing regular articles for the Worcester Evening Post throughout the 1930s. With a grant from the John Simon Guggenheim Memorial Foundation he would write his best known work, The Delusson Family, a loosely autobiographical novel on his upbringing, named for his paternelle family, as they had originally hailed from Luçon in Vendée, France ("de Luçon"). Published in 1939, it represented the first English-language Franco American novel, to some controversy at the time from the genre's traditionally New England French-speaking audience.

Ducharme's book would enjoy modest sales for a debut author, of about 4,500 copies in its first years. The novel would also garner a certain praise from one of Quebec and New England's most prominent critic's Louis Dantin. Although Dantin had previously once exclaimed there "was no such thing as 'Franco-American literature'", his review in the July 1939 issue of Le Jour not only used the term, but praised Ducharme– understanding that the novel was, in part, an effort to reach audiences outside the community–

To the audience she [the novel] speaks to, ignorant of Canadian life, she might be a revelation. What may seem futile and hackneyed to us will seem curious, exotic. And the work thus will have achieved its goal, to make known and esteemed in American circles the solid qualities of the French-Canadian race. Is it the author's fault if, for us, her compatriots, she does not teach us enough?

Indeed, in his own reflection, given in the French language, before the Société Historique Franco-Américaine in Boston, Ducharme would recount how his own publishers in New York were only aware of the Cajuns of Louisiana, and how the Franco-Americans of New England were unknown to them. In writing The Delusson Family, Ducharme stated he sought to bring the story of his people to the broader American audience. From a strictly literary standpoint, the book received mixed reviews. In The Saturday Review critic Kenneth Payson Kempton noted Ducharme had "no sense of what Phyllis Bentley calls 'scene'" and described the story as "sometimes dull" with a pronounced absence of commentary on industrial exploitation. But Kempton would add that the faults were those of an inexperienced author, and stated he saw the book as the start of a promising career.

The Delusson Family, would also enjoy certain national popularity in Catholic circles as well as after being picked up by the Catholic Book Club of America, the Jesuit magazine. The novel, while not having an official French translation, was subsequently published the following year in a Dutch version, translated by poet and critic Gabriël Smit.

First edition of De Familie Delusson, a Dutch translation of the novel by Gabriël Smit, featuring a portrait of the likeness of Jean-Baptiste, 1940

In the year after publishing The Delusson Family, Ducharme turned to his prior experience publishing articles for the Worcester Evening Post and bought the Franco-American weekly La Justice, in Holyoke, operating it as editor-publisher for 14 months before selling it to its head printer. Under Ducharme's ownership, the paper included poetry from its past longtime-owner Joseph Lussier, as well as a popular column "La Vie Courante" ("The Current Life") by Holyokais writer Gabriel Crevier. While praising France for its earlier cultural outreach toward Franco-Americans in the 1930s, contrasting the Anglo-dominated Canadian government, Ducharme was a staunch detractor of Vichy France in his editorials, and saw Franco-Americans as more American than French ultimately. Ducharme would repeatedly emphasize the importance he saw in adapting to "Americanism", as France veered into a Fascistic era under Marshal Pétain.

=== The Town and the City comparison ===
Both fellow Franco-American writer Rosaire Dion-Lévesque and Kerouac biographer Maurice Poteet, would cite The Delusson Family as a likely influence of Jack Kerouac's debut novel The Town and the City. Though never explicitly confirmed, Poteet would note- "[t]he influence of Jacques Ducharme's novel, The Delusson Family, is however less hypothetical. In fact, The Town and the City can be read as its extension, as a variant of the same genre. Although the daily routine of the Delussons distinguish this story from the climate of anguish and alienation that reigns among the Martins of Kerouac, certain elements of Ducharme's novel suggest that it may have inspired Kerouac." (Note: Original in French:"L'influence du roman de Jacques Ducharme, The Delusson Family, est cependant moins hypothétique. En fait, The Town and the City peut se lire comme son extension, comme une variante du même genre. Quoique la routine quotidienne des Delusson distingue ce récit du climat d'angoisse et d'aliénation qui règne chez les Martin de Kerouac, certains éléments du roman de Ducharme suggèrent qu'il a pu inspirer Kerouac.") Indeed, noting the death of the patriarch of the family as the most significant events in both books, Poteet would draw the following comparisons between the two protagonist families-

Delusson (Ducharme)	Martin (Kerouac)
Jean-Baptiste (father, dies)	George (father, dies)
Cécile (née Landeau)	Marguerite (née Courbet)
Etienne (elder, vagabond, farmer)	Joe (elder, vagabond, farmer)
Louise (returns to Quebec)	Rose (like her mother)
Jean-Baptiste Jr. (dies young)	Julien (dies young)
Leopold (studies in Quebec and Rome)	Francis (studies in Sorbonne, France)
Marie (in business)	Ruth (business-like)
Pierre (main character)	Peter (main character)
Wilfred (returns to family farm)	Mickey (returns to family farm)
Adélaïde (homemaker)	Elizabeth (singer)
Clément (dies young of disease)	Charley (dies young in WWII)

Poteet went further, comparing not only the structure but also the name, "Delusson", invoking the word "delusion", he would note its similarity with Kerouac's Duluoz, a surname he would later adapt for characters mirroring his own family in later novels. Though not explicit, the comparison was strong enough for Kerouac biographer Barry Miles to repeat it in his own biography of Kerouac in 1998, who also speculated if Kerouac's use the found phrase "shadows of the trees" may have been influenced by his having copies of Ducharme's books. The differences however outside of structure differentiate the two substantially both in tone and as Kerouac would explore the vagabond life of his character Joe, in New York, far more than Bohemian counterpart Etienne in Delusson. Poteet would emphasize as well that Ducharme's work would be "largely overwhelmed by the energy of Kerouac's prose, master of descriptive discourse and dialogue".

Within a year of the publication of Town and the City, Dion-Lévesque had also drawn comparisons between the two books, placing Ducharme as a predecessor of Kerouac, and asking Kerouac about the role of the Franco-American culture in his books. Kerouac would reply "I did not try to elaborate on it, the Franco-American fact... it is something I do however in my novel in preparation", noting his Martin family was an amalgamation of the community he had known in Lowell. (Note: Original in French: "Je n'ai pas tenté d'y élaborer «le fait francoaméricain» ... chose que je ferai cependant dans mon roman en préparation...") Between the two, Ducharme would outsell Kerouac with his initial run of The Delusson Family in 1939, with about 4,500 copies sold. Kerouac's debut novel, though printed in 10,500 copies, would only sell a few hundred, however while Kerouac is among the best-known Franco-American novelists, ultimately his success derived, not from this identity, but his association with the Beat Generation in his second novel On the Road.

== Ethnographer and historian ==
First edition of The Shadows of the Trees

Ultimately Ducharme would sell La Justice due to the fluctuations in advertising revenue that led to him spending more time soliciting ads than editing the weekly paper, It was around that same time that he began developing The Shadows of the Trees, his second and last volume, an ethnography of sorts on the Franco-Americans of New England. Choosing the title as an homage to Robert P. T. Coffin's The Kennebec, initially Ducharme sought a Guggenheim Fellowship for his work, having previously received some support from the foundation. He would end up, however, working at an aircraft plant for wartime production in Hartford to support this project, which included weeks of driving across all corners of New England and parts of Quebec to interview different prominent figures in the French-Canadian diaspora.

Ducharme would formally sign his contract with Harper in 1941. During his research, he remarked it was possible to go days at a time in his travels without speaking or reading any English, but nevertheless he felt that he was documenting a fading culture, remarking to the Société Historique Franco-Américaine- (Note: Original in French: "Que faisons-nous? Nous végétons. Nous dormons sur nos lauriers. Je ne parle pas des écoles, mais plutôt de notre vie artistique et littéraire. Comptons nos poètes d'aujourd'hui. J'en connais quatre ou cinq. Nos romanciers. Il n y en a pas. Historiens, oui, il y en a, mais jusqu'ici personne ne s'est avisé de faire une histoire générale des Franco-Américains. C'est toujours l'histoire locale qui nous préoccupe, ainsi que les Canadiens français, à tel point que je vous défie de me citer une histoire du Canada, histoire compréhensive, depuis la colonisation jusqu'à nos jours.")

"What do we do? We are vegetating. We sleep on our laurels. I am not talking about schools, but rather about our artistic and literary life. Let us count our poets today. I know four or five. Our novelists. There are not any. Historians, yes, there are, but so far no one has dared to write a general history of Franco-Americans. It is always local history that concerns us, as well as French Canadians, to such an extent that I challenge you to quote me a history of Canada, a comprehensive history, since the colonization until the present day."

His book would place a heavy focus on the role of the church, as its parish schools and the work of its parishioners made survivance of the French language possible. The importance of the church to the community was not solely Ducharme's opinion and was later echoed by his journalistic peer Gabriel Crevier. In New England French circles, the church served as the first source of socialization, people subsequently familiarized themselves with societies outside the parish, including benefit societies, cultural clubs, drama troupes, radio stations, and newspapers, among other institutions.

Ducharme would publish his work The Shadows of the Trees in 1943 to mixed reactions, both for its use of English, seen as a liability to Franco-American proponents of survivance, and views that the French language could be as much a part of American culture as English. For Ducharme, the choice of English for the book and his previous novel represented a new epoch in Franco-American literature, as his was a much broader audience than those who spoke French, the audience of the collective body of Franco-American literature up until that time. Nevertheless, his positive attitude toward bilingualism was also criticized by Anglophones as well, with Henry Beston remarking in his New York Times review of the book- "I do not happen to agree with his position on linguistic separatism to me (a New England neighbor), the policy seems wrong on this side of the frontier." Beston would however acknowledge the account represented one of many in a people adjusting to Americanism, despite such disagreement, and added that it was a unique addition to American history in the English language, as few such-books were written in a language besides New England French. A unique albeit incomplete account, Ducharme's history book would go on to be cited in a number of other historical works on ethnicity in America, including by Harvard professor of history Oscar Handlin, and journalist Carey McWilliams who compared Ducharme's portrayal of the struggle of assimilation of Franco-Americans with that of the Tejanos in the American Southwest.

== Later life and advocacy ==
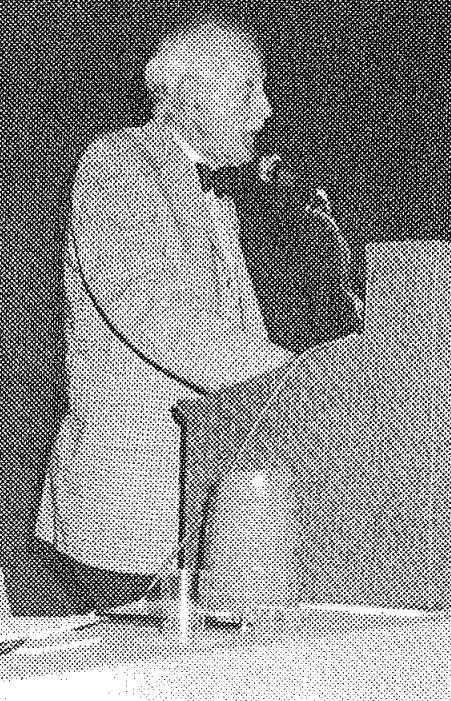
Ducharme, speaking at a Bedford, New Hampshire conference hosted by the National Materials Development Center for French and Portuguese, June 10, 1976

Shortly after publishing The Shadows of the Trees, Ducharme would work for the Springfield Republican as a book reviewer, and in the last year of the Second World War, enlisted in the Office of Strategic Services, as a press officer in the European theatre. Building on his experience with the OSS during wartime, Ducharme briefly served as an American correspondent for a number of French journals started at its end, including Le Maine libre and La Nouvelle République. After returning to the United States in 1945, he left New England, moving to Rye, New York to work for IBM as a technical writer, subsequently the book editor of Think Magazine, and lastly as the editor of IBM Research News. While remaining an active advocate of Franco-American culture, he did not publish any more books, and only briefly saw a reprise in his writing career writing a short piece for The Saturday Review in 1956, Knowledge Without Pain, commenting on the achievements of modern science. Ducharme would remain at IBM for the remainder of his career, retiring in 1975, after which he returned to New England, moving to Stratford, Connecticut in November of that year.

In retirement he would continue to take part in Franco-American literary preservation during the Revival era, speaking at length at a 1976 conference on the subject hosted by the National Materials Development Center for French and Portuguese, which had used grants to republish a number of novels and later the first New England French-language novel in half a century with L'Heritage in 1983. Though Ducharme himself remained solely a consultant in retirement, he would correspond with the center's team who published A Franco-American Overview, a series of textbooks on Franco-American culture and history developed for a grade school audience, and he would continue to write to other researchers covering the subject at his alma mater and other academic institutions over the next two decades. Jacques Ducharme died on December 30, 1993, in Hartford, Connecticut.

== Works ==
- The Delusson Family (1939)
- The Shadows of the Trees (1943)
- Knowledge Without Pain (1957), in The Saturday Review
- Après Trente Ans (1976), in Les Franco-Américains: La promesse du passé, les réalités du présent
