= Émile Nelligan =

Canadian poet (1879–1941)

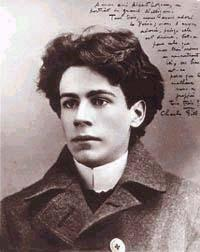
- Nelligan in 1899
- Born: 24 December 1879; Montreal, Quebec, Canada
- Died: 18 November 1941 (aged 61); Montreal, Quebec, Canada
- Burial place: Notre Dame des Neiges Cemetery, Montreal
- Occupation: Poet
- Years active: 1890–1899
- Notable work: Le vaisseau d'or; Soir d'hiver
- Movement: Symbolism

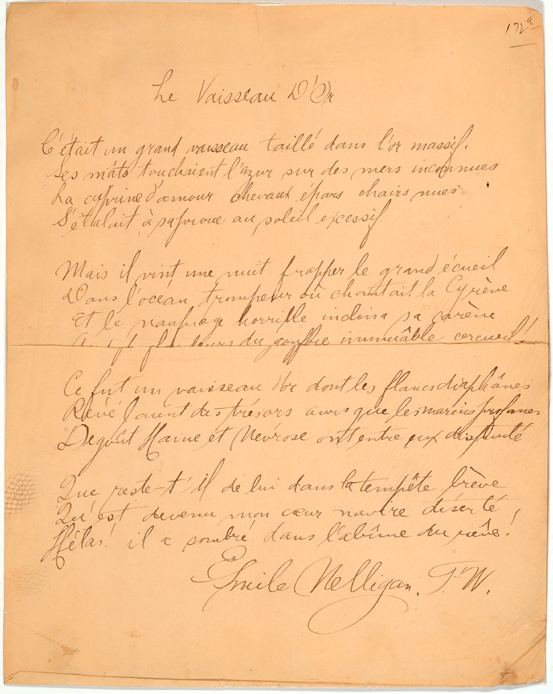
Manuscript of Le Vaisseau d'Or (The Ship of Gold)

Émile Nelligan (December 24, 1879 – November 18, 1941) was a French Canadian Symbolist poet influenced by Romanticism. Although he almost entirely ceased writing poetry after being institutionalized at the age of nineteen, Nelligan remains an iconic figure in Quebecois culture and was considered by Edmund Wilson to be the greatest Canadian poet in any language.

== Biography ==
=== Early life and career ===
Nelligan was born in Montreal on December 24, 1879 at 602, rue de La Gauchetière (Annuaire Lovell's de 1879). He was the eldest son of David Nelligan, who arrived in Quebec from Dublin at the age of seven or eight. His mother was Émilie Amanda Hudon, a French Canadian from Rimouski. At home, he spoke in French to his mother and English to his father. He generally preferred speaking in French. He had two sisters, Béatrice Eva (1881–1954) and Gertrude Freda (1883–1925).

His childhood was spent between his home in Montreal and a summer residence in Cacouna. Much of his early education was received from Hudon, with whom he shared a profound bond.

From 1890 through 1893, he studied at the Collège Mont-Saint-Louis; afterwards, in September of the latter year, he entered classical college at the Collège de Montréal. He failed the first year of his course, with the need to work on his Latin. His syntax course continued in 1895, at the Collège Sainte-Marie de Montréal; however, he was an indolent student who often cut classes, instead focusing on plays, poems and prose. In March 1897, Nelligan failed his examinations, subsequently withdrawing from education entirely.

During his adolescence, Nelligan was considered precocious, like Arthur Rimbaud. He identified as a follower of Symbolism, conceiving poetry influenced by Octave Crémazie, Louis Fréchette, Charles Baudelaire, Paul Verlaine, Georges Rodenbach, Maurice Rollinat, and Edgar Allan Poe. On 13 June 1896, following his victory in a poetry contest, the Montreallais newspaper Le Samedi released his first published poem, Rêve fantasque (Fantastical Dream), under the pseudonym Émile Kovar.

Some of Nelligan's most famous poems include La Romance du vin (The Romance of Wine), Soir d'hiver (Winter Evening), and Le Vaisseau d'Or (The Ship of Gold). All these works date to his youth.

=== Institutionalization ===
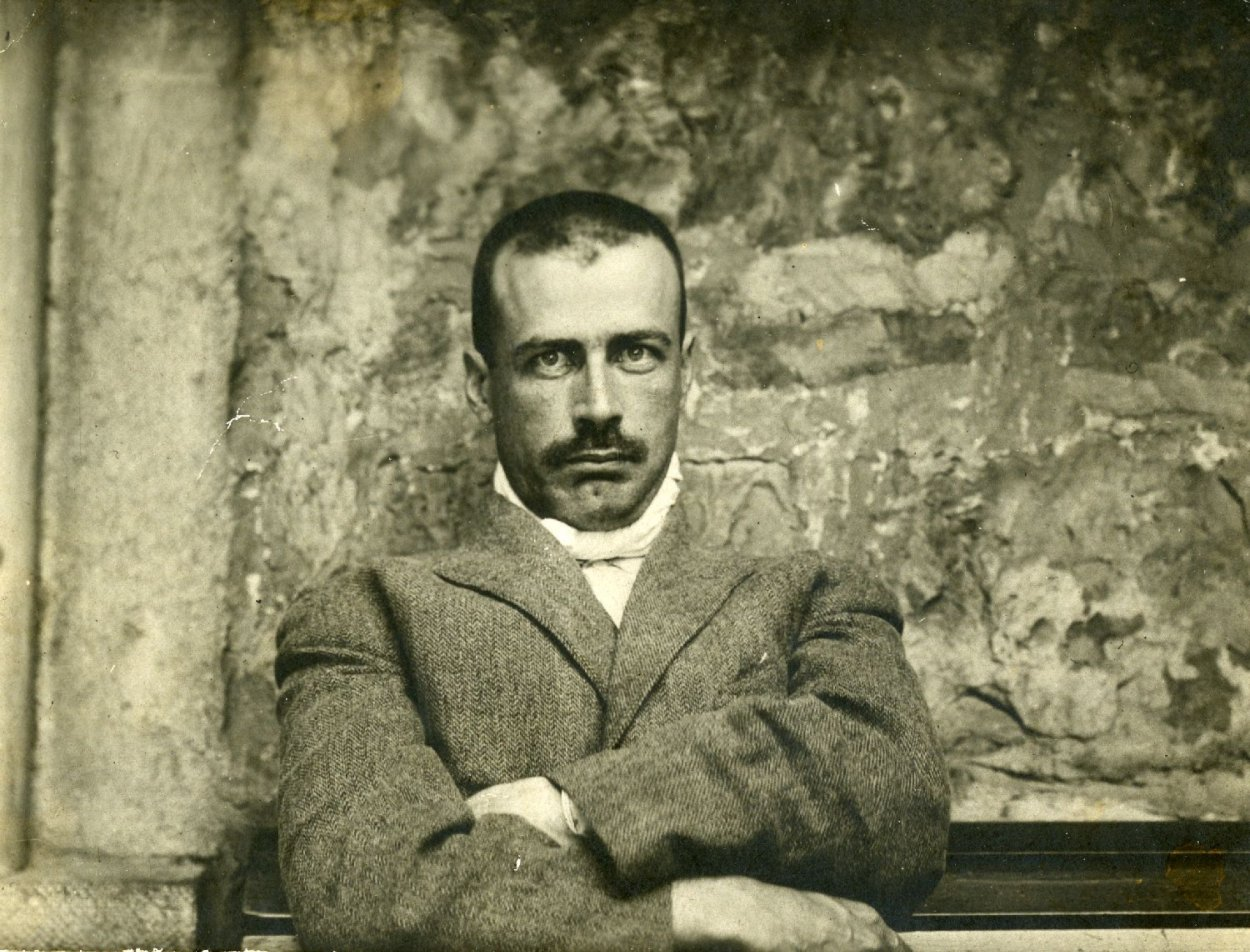
Nelligan institutionalized at the Retraite Saint-Benoît-Labre, ca. 1919-1920

In 1899, Nelligan began exhibiting unusual behaviour. He loudly declaimed poetry to passing strangers, slept in chapels, and experienced hallucinations, culminating in a suicide attempt. At his parents' request, he was committed, aged nineteen, to the Retraite Saint-Benoît-Labre, a mental hospital run by the Brothers of Charity. There, he was diagnosed with dementia praecox (now referred to as schizophrenia). He wrote little poetry after being hospitalized.

Contemporary speculation suggested that he went insane because of the vast cultural and language differences between his mother and father. However, more recently, various literary critics theorized that Nelligan may have been gay. Some of these sources allege that he became mentally ill due to inner conflict between his sexual orientation and his Catholicism. Others suggest that he was never insane at all, but was dishonestly committed to the asylum by his family to avoid potential homophobia.

Nelligan's sexual orientation has remained an extremely controversial topic. No sources published during his lifetime contain any record of involvement within sexual or romantic relationships; despite this, some posthumous biographers suggest that he may have been the lover of Arthur de Bussières. Within the École littéraire de Montréal circle, with which the two poets were associated, it was believed that Nelligan was confined because his mother discovered him and Bussières together in bed. This allegation was not widely publicized until the late twentieth century and remains unproven.

Conversely, the 1991 biographical film Nelligan portrays him as sexually ambivalent in the face of romantic attractions to both Bussières and the feminist activist Idola Saint-Jean, as well as implying (without evidence) that his mother attempted to commit incest with him.

=== Publication and fame ===
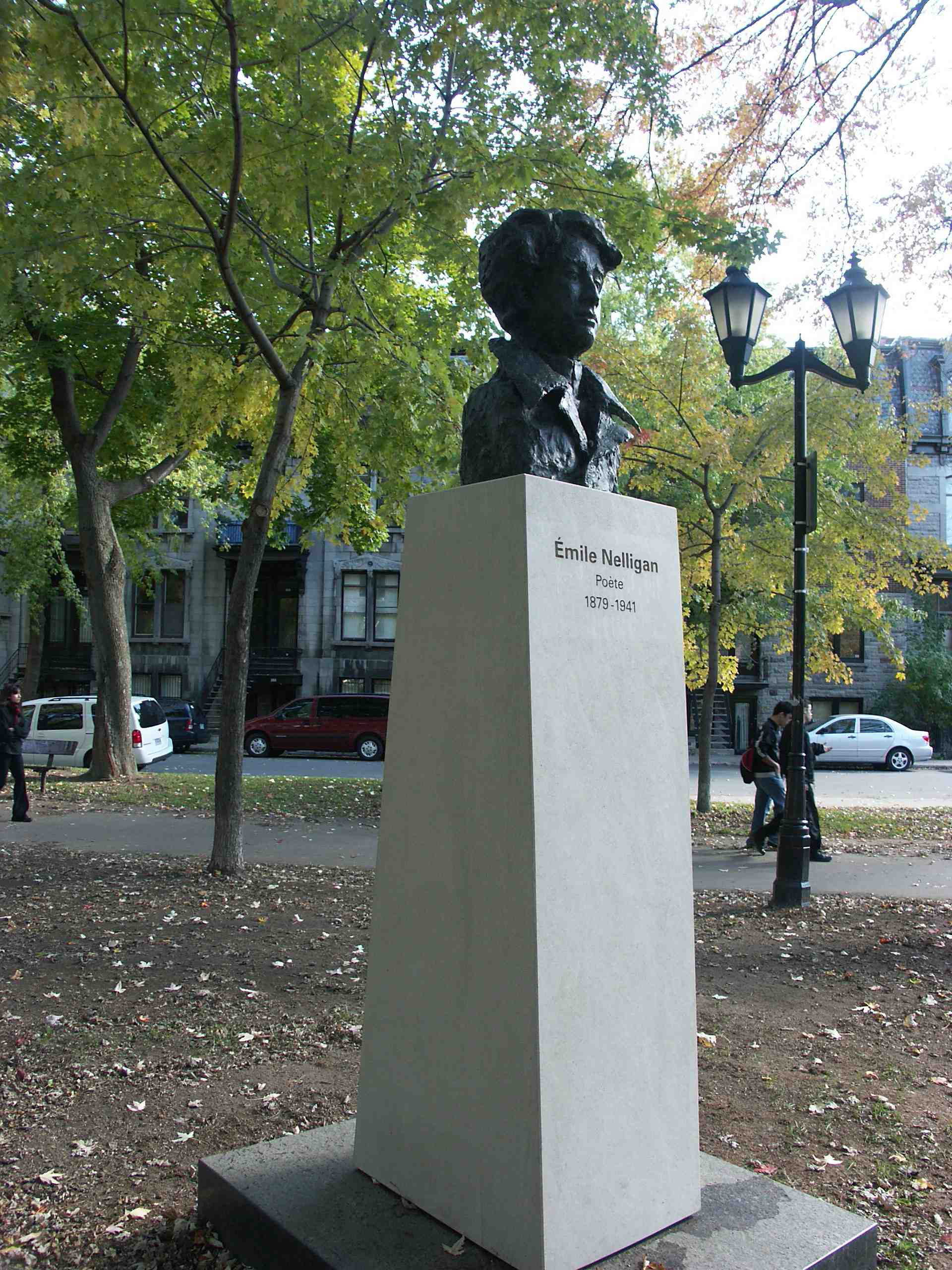
Nelligan bust in Saint-Louis Square, Montreal

In 1903, his collected poems, Émile Nelligan et son œuvre (Émile Nelligan and his Œuvre), were released to critical acclaim across Canada. The volume was edited by Louis Dantin and edited by Beauchemin. Though aware of these efforts, Nelligan was unaware of the true extent of his renown.

Nelligan was transferred to the Saint John of God Asylum (now the Montréal University Institute for Mental Health) in 1925.

=== Death and legacy ===
At the age of 61, Nelligan died on 18 November 1941 at the Saint John of God Hospital from cardiorenal syndrome, arteriosclerosis, and chronic prostatitis. He was buried at the Notre Dame des Neiges Cemetery in Montreal.

Shortly afterwards, the public became increasingly interested in Nelligan. His incomplete work spawned a kind of romantic legend.

In her 2013 book Le Naufragé du Vaisseau d'or, Yvette Francoli claimed that Dantin was the true author of much of Nelligan's œuvre. This claim was previously proposed in Claude-Henri Grignon's 1936 essay Les Pamphlets de Valdombre, although Dantin himself stated that his poetic involvement was solely editorial. In 2016, the University of Ottawa's literary journal Analyses published an article by Annette Hayward and Christian Vandendorpe which rejected the claim, based on textual comparisons of Nelligan's writing with Dantin's own.

== Tributes ==
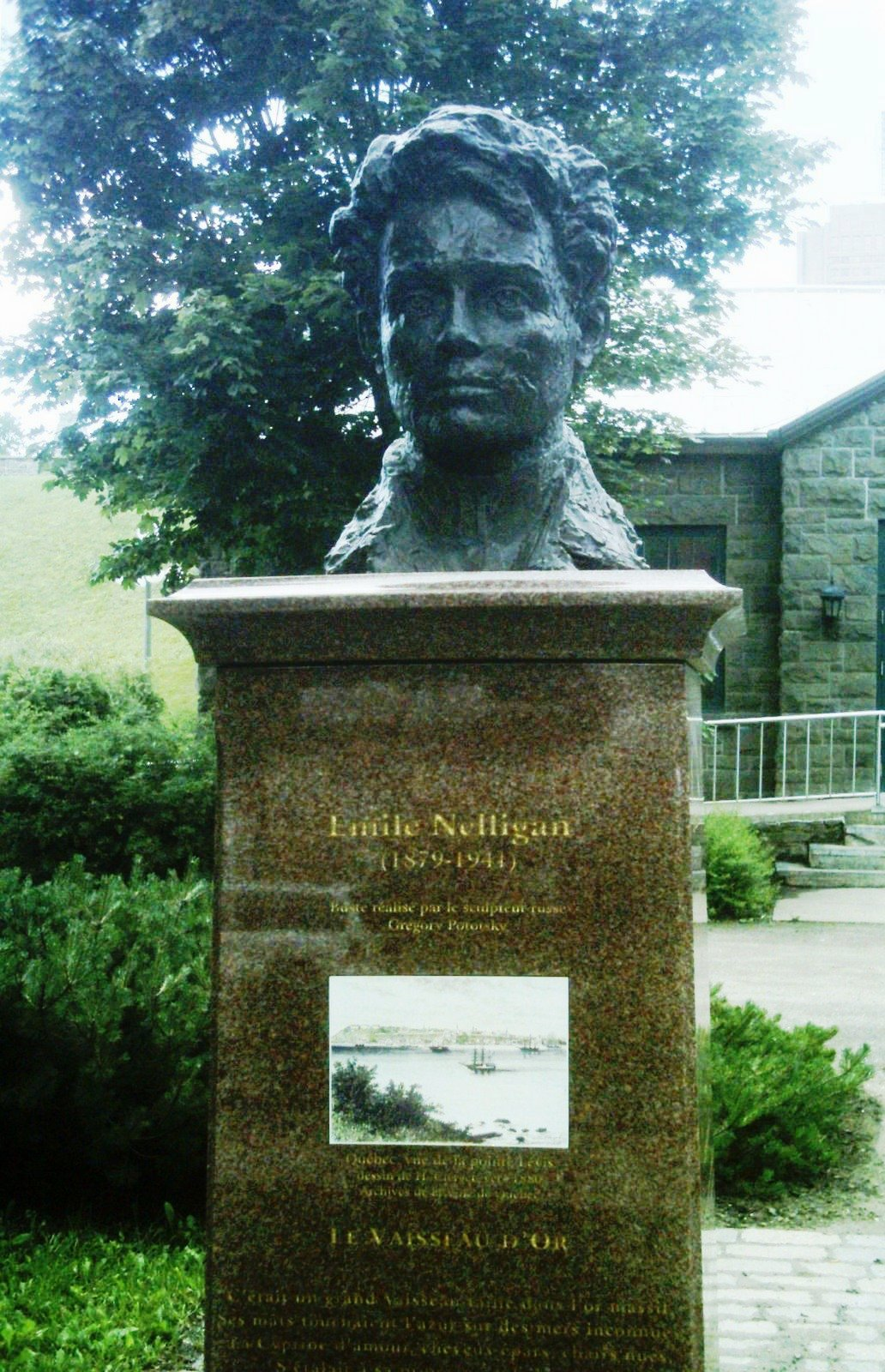
Nelligan bust in Quebec City

Several Quebecois libraries and schools bear Nelligan's name. Since 1979, the annual Prix Émile-Nelligan has been awarded to North American authors of French poetry volumes.

On June 7, 2005, the Émile Nelligan Foundation and the municipal government of Montreal unveiled a memorial bust at Saint-Louis Square. Another bust stands in Quebec City.

In Old Montreal, the four-star Hotel Nelligan stands at the corner of Saint-Paul Street and Saint-Sulpice Street.

Numerous composers have set Nelligan's poetry to music or used his work as inspiration for their compositions:

- André Gagnon. Nelligan, Toronto: Disques SRC, 2005, 2 discs (concert recorded at the Salle Wilfrid-Pelletier of the Place des Arts in Montréal, on February 18-19, 2005)
- Gilbert Patenaude. Compagnons des Amériques : poètes québécois mis en musique, Montréal: Disques XXI, 2005, 1 disc
- Jean Chatillon. Clair de lune sur les eaux du rêve, Bécancour: Éditions de l'Écureuil noir, 2001 (1 disc)
- Jacques Hétu. Le tombeau de Nelligan : mouvement symphonique opus 52, Saint-Nicolas: Doberman-Yppan, 1995 (1 score: 44 pages)
- John Craton. Jardin sentimental : Cinq poèmes d'Émile Nelligan, Bedford, Ind: Wolfhead Music, 2004, 18 pages.
- André Gagnon and Claude Léveillée. Monique Leyrac chante Emile Nelligan, Verdun: Disques Mérite, 1991, 1 disc
- André Gagnon. Nelligan : livret d'opéra, Montréal: Leméac, 1990, 90 pages (text by Michel Tremblay)
- Jacques Hétu. Les abîmes du rêve : opus 36, Montréal: Sociéte nouvelle d'enregistrement, 1987, duration 30:21
- Richard G. Boucher. Anges maudits, veuillez m'aider! : cantate dramatique sur des poèmes d'Émile Nelligan, Montréal: Radio Canada international, 1981, duration 38 min.
- Omer Létourneau. Violon de villanelle : choeur pour voix de femmes, Québec: Procure générale de musique enr., 1940 (1 score: 8 pages)

== Selected bibliography ==
=== Collections ===
- 1903 - Émile Nelligan et son œuvre, Montréal: Beauchemin (Louis Dantin) online
- 1952 - Poésies complètes : 1896-1899, Montréal: Fides (Luc Lacourcière)
- 1966 - Poèmes choisis, Montréal: Fides (Eloi de Grandmont)
- 1980 - Poèmes choisis, Montréal: Fides (Roger Chamberland)
- 1982 - 31 Poèmes autographes : 2 carnets d'hôpital, 1938, Trois-Rivières: Forges
- 1991 - Le Récital des anges : 50 poèmes d'Émile Nelligan, Trois-Rivières: Forges (Claude Beausoleil)
- 1991 - Oeuvres complètes, Montréal: Fides, 2 volumes (Réjean Robidoux and Paul Wyczynski)
- 1991 - Poèmes autographes, Montréal: Fides, 1991, (Paul Wyczynski)
- 1995 - Poésie en version originale, Montréal: Triptyque (André Marquis)
- 1997 - Poèmes choisis : le récital de l'ange, Saint-Hippolyte: Noroît (Jocelyne Felx)
- 1998 - Poésies complètes, La Table Ronde: Paris, 1998
- 2004 - Poésies complètes, 1896-1941, Montréal: Fides (text established, annotated and presented by Réjean Robidoux and Paul Wyczynski)
- 2006 - Oeuvres complètes, Montréal: Bibliothèque québécoise (critical edition by Jacques Michon, reviewed, corrected and augmented by André Gervais in collaboration with Jacques Michon)
- 2020 – Émile Nelligan et son œuvre, Québec, Codicille éditeur (« Bibliothèque mobile de littérature québécoise »). (HTML)

=== In English translation ===
- Selected Poems - 1960 (translated by P. F. Widdows)
- The Complete Poems of Emile Nelligan - 1982 (translated by Fred Cogswell)
- Ship of Gold: The Essential Poems of Emile Nelligan - 2017 (translated by Marc di Saverio)
- Selected Verse of Emile Nelligan - 2023 (translated by Ian Allaby)
