= Danin (disambiguation) =

Danin is a town in Pakistan it may also refer to

- Danin, Hama, a village in Syria
- Danin (name)
