= Institut universitaire en santé mentale de Montréal =

- CIUSSS de l'Est-de-L’Île-de-Montréal
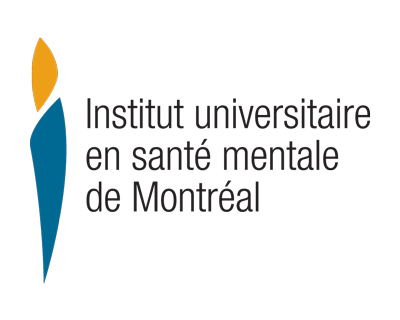

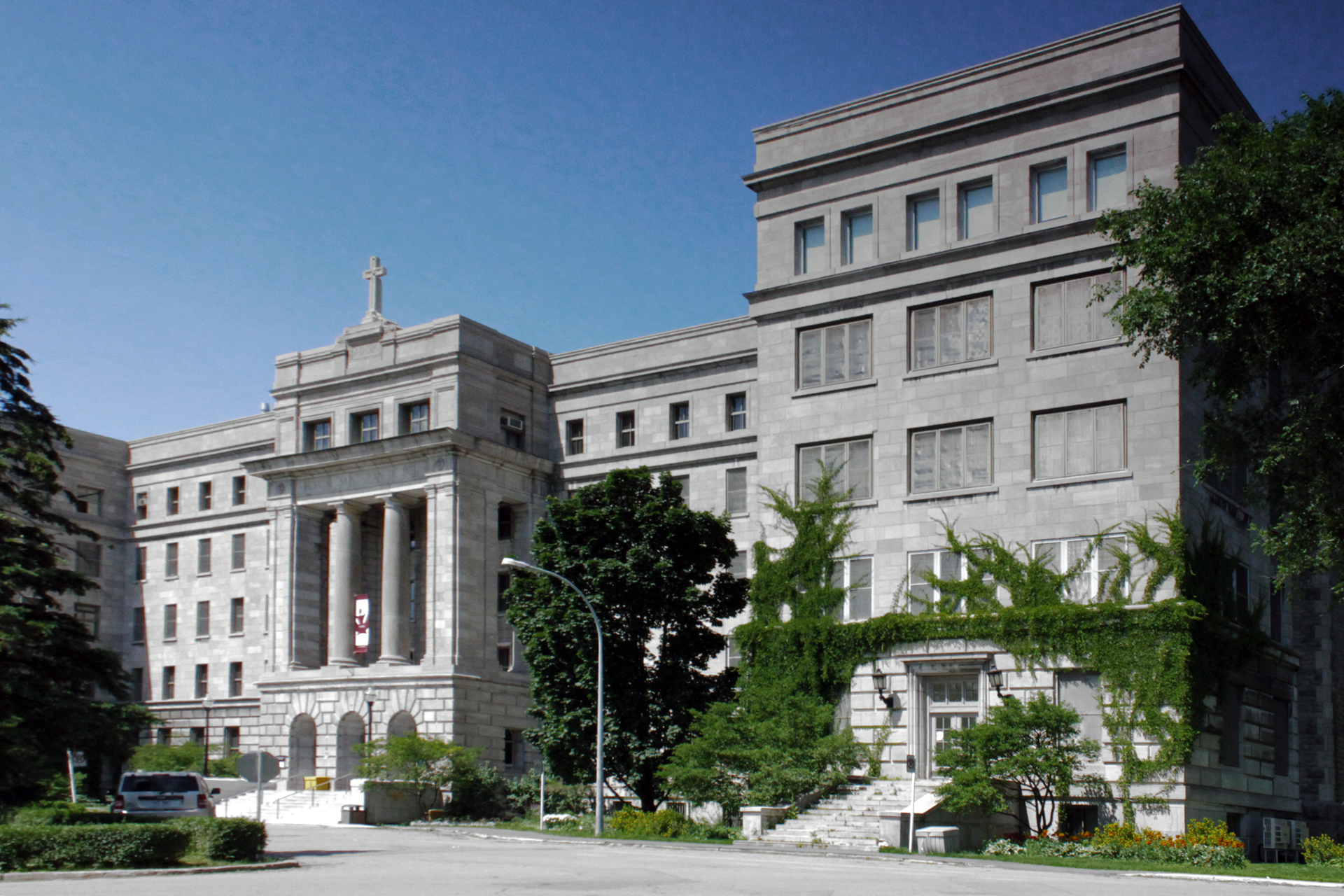

- Location within Montreal

Geography
- Location: 7401, rue Hochelaga; Montreal, Quebec, Canada; H1N 3M5
- Coordinates: 45.5886°N 73.529°W

Organisation
- Care system: RAMQ (Quebec medicare)
- Type: Specialist
- Affiliated university: Université de Montréal Faculty of Medicine

Services
- Beds: 389
- Speciality: Psychiatric

History
- Founded: 1873

Links
- Website: https://criusmm.ciusss-estmtl.gouv.qc.ca/fr

Institut universitaire en santé mentale de Montréal is a psychiatric hospital in Montreal, Quebec, Canada. It is located at 7401 Hochelaga Street in the borough of Mercier–Hochelaga-Maisonneuve. It was established in 1873 and is affiliated with the Université de Montréal Faculty of Medicine.

The facility receives people with severe mental health problems.

It opened its doors in 1873 under the name of "Asile (hospice) Saint-Jean-de-Dieu." It has been designated as "asile de Longue-Pointe," the name of the place. On May 16, 1890, about 100 people were killed in a terrible fire that almost completely destroyed the institution.

The poet Émile Nelligan resided in the hospital from 1925 to 1941.

It had hosted up to 5,000 patients. The number has declined since the 1980s and some wings were closed. In 1976, the Hôpital St-Jean-de-Dieu became the Hôpital Louis-H. Lafontaine. On October 14, 2011, Hôpital Louis-H. Lafontaine is designated a mental health university institute. On March 5, 2013, the Hôpital Louis-H. Lafontaine renamed to become the Institut universitaire en santé mentale de Montréal.
