= Nelligan (film) =

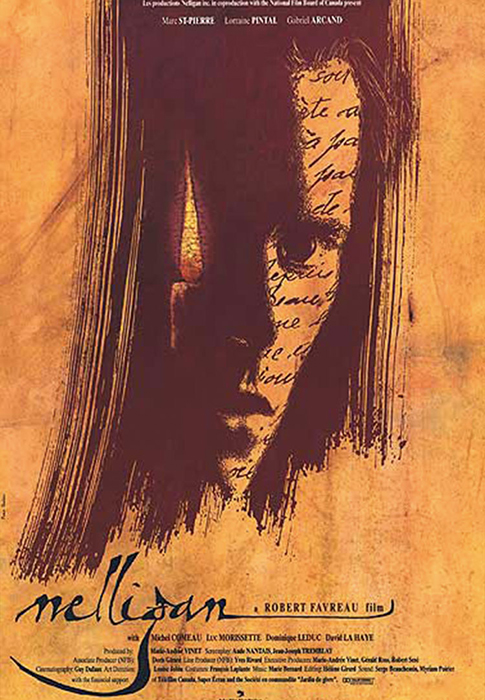
- Directed by: Robert Favreau
- Written by: Robert Favreau; Aude Nantais; Claude Poissant; Jean-Joseph Tremblay
- Produced by: Marie-Andrée Vinet
- Starring: Marc Saint-Pierre; Luc Morissette; Lorraine Pintal; Gabriel Arcand; David La Haye
- Cinematography: Guy Dufaux
- Edited by: Hélène Girard
- Music by: Marie Bernard
- Production company: Les Productions Nelligan
- Release date: 1991
- Running time: 105 minutes
- Country: Canada
- Language: French

Nelligan is a 1991 Canadian drama film, directed by Robert Favreau. A biopic of Quebec poet Émile Nelligan, the film stars Marc Saint-Pierre as the adolescent Nelligan and Michel Comeau as the adult Nelligan after his confinement to an insane asylum.

The film also stars Luc Morissette and Lorraine Pintal as Nelligan's parents, Gabriel Arcand as his mentor Eugène Seers, David La Haye as his friend and colleague Arthur de Bussières, Dominique Leduc as his friend Idola Saint-Jean, Christian Bégin as poet Jean Charbonneau, and Gilles Pelletier as poet Louis-Honoré Fréchette. A key theme of the film is that Nelligan was a poète maudit continually pulled in different directions by opposing forces, including the conflicting cultural identities of his Irish-Canadian father and his French-Canadian mother, the competing influences of Seers and Fréchette on his writing, and a nearly asexual ambivalence in his personal relationships with both Bussières and Saint-Jean. The film also posits that Nelligan was subject to incestuous advances by his mother.

The film received two Genie Award nominations at the 12th Genie Awards in 1991, for Best Cinematography (Guy Dufaux) and Best Costume Design (François Laplante).
