= Precious Blood Church fire =

1875 church fire in Massachusetts

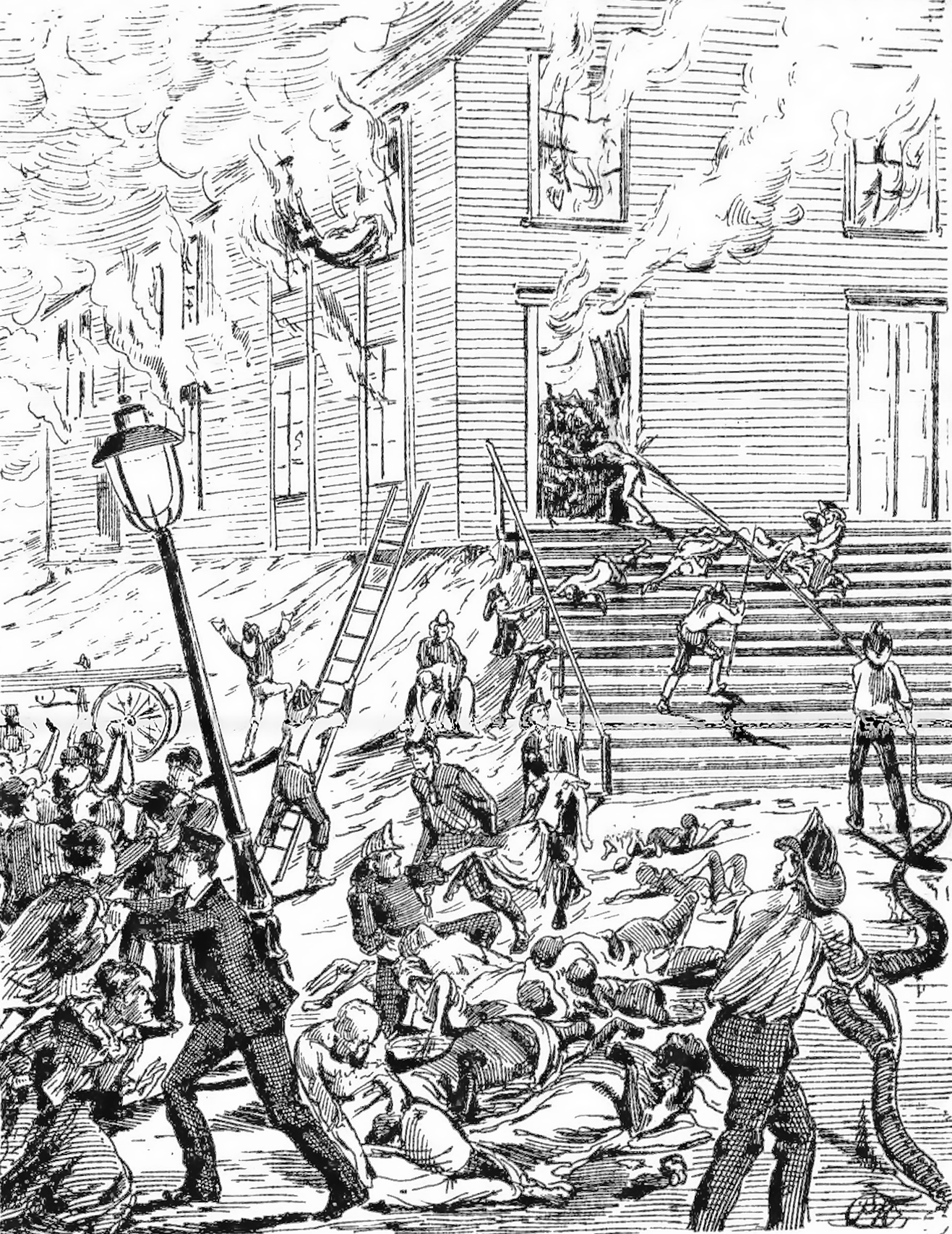
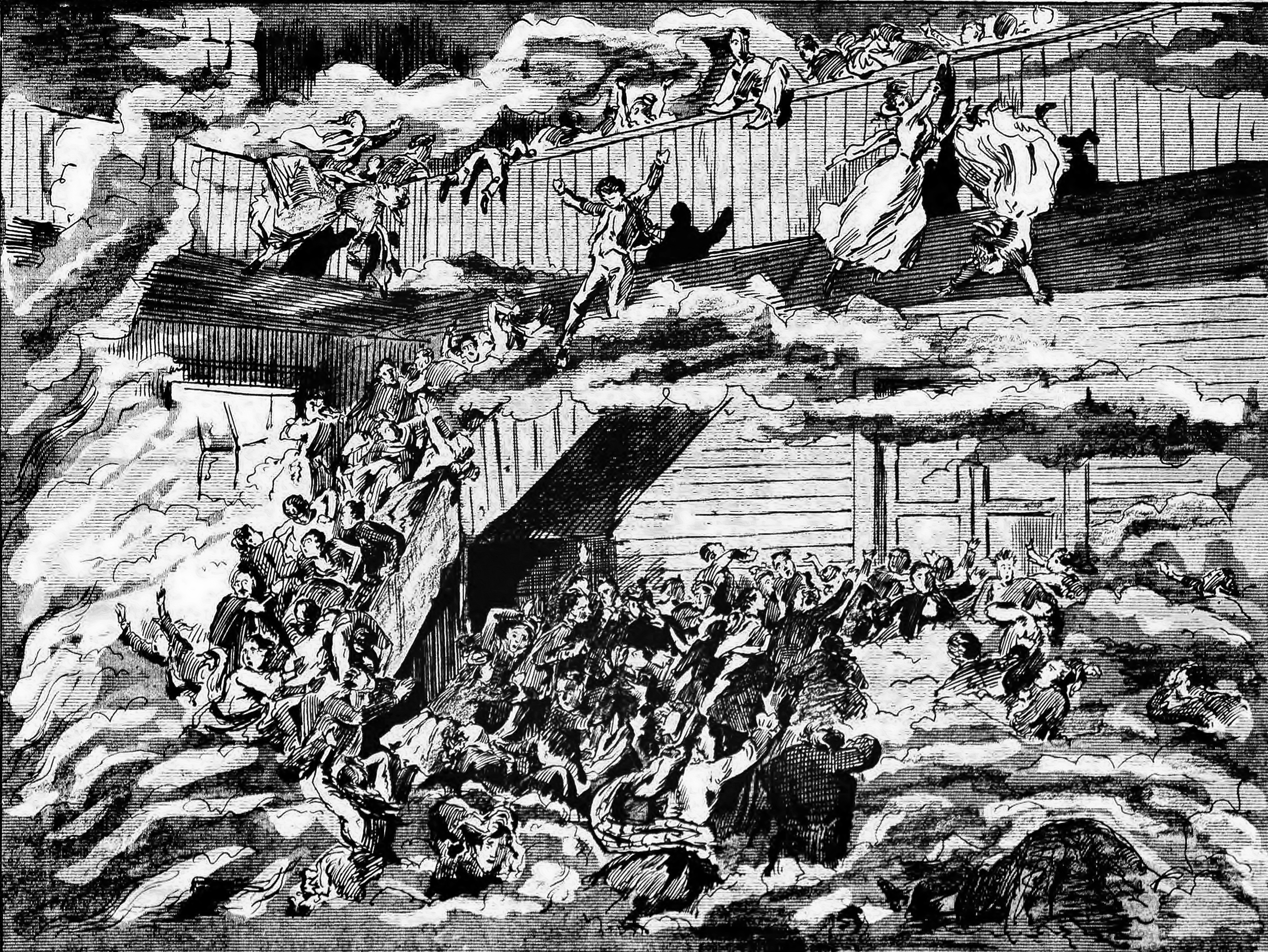
- Top to bottom: Artist's drawing of members of the Holyoke Fire Department attempting to extinguish the fire, while fireman John T. Lynch pulls people from the front door; the panic inside the sanctuary as parishioners attempt to escape
- Date: May 27, 1875
- Location: Holyoke, Massachusetts, US
- Coordinates: 42°11′56.0688″N 72°36′21.1032″W

Impacts
- Deaths: 78 killed 34 injured

Ignition
- Cause: A breeze from an open window blew lacing draped over a statue of the Blessed Virgin Mary into a lit candle

Precious Blood Church of Holyoke, Massachusetts, burned on May 27, 1875, killing 78 people. There was a crush of people through the entrance at the back left and many people could not leave. It is one of the deadliest fires in American history, and was also known by newspapers domestic and foreign as "The Holyoke Disaster".

== Event ==
The fire started at the front of the church as a candle flame ignited a curtain.

Panic caused people to rush from the upper levels to a front door. The door was made to open inward only, so many were trapped against the door. Reverend Andre Dufresne was the parish priest. He tried to calm the people and direct them as much as possible.

The event and its aftermath were also later depicted in some detail in the Franco-American novel Mirbah by Emma Port-Joli Dumas, originally published in Holyoke's La Justice.

== Location ==
The church complex is located on the city block formed by Cabot, South East, Clemente, (Note: Clemente appears on maps of the time as Park Street.) and Hamilton Streets. The wooden church had been built in 1870 and was replaced in 1876 by a brick church. The Park Street School was located on the other side of Hamilton Street between Park and South East Streets. The school was used as a temporary morgue for the fire victims. Only the convent and rectory remain today since the brick church and school were dismantled.

The cemetery is on Willimansett Street Extension near the intersection of Routes 33 and 202 in South Hadley. There is a monument for the dead at the church cemetery. The parish priest was also reburied there. The black memorial is in the center of the cemetery and the priest is buried behind that.

== Fatalities ==
A list of the dead is given below by first and last name and then age. Many were buried in a common grave on May 29 at the Precious Blood Cemetery in South Hadley. All were French Canadians.

The names have been taken directly from the monument. The list on the monument was compiled from the Holyoke Deaths Register and from various newspaper articles. Some French names may have been recorded incorrectly due to the use of English rather than French spelling conventions.

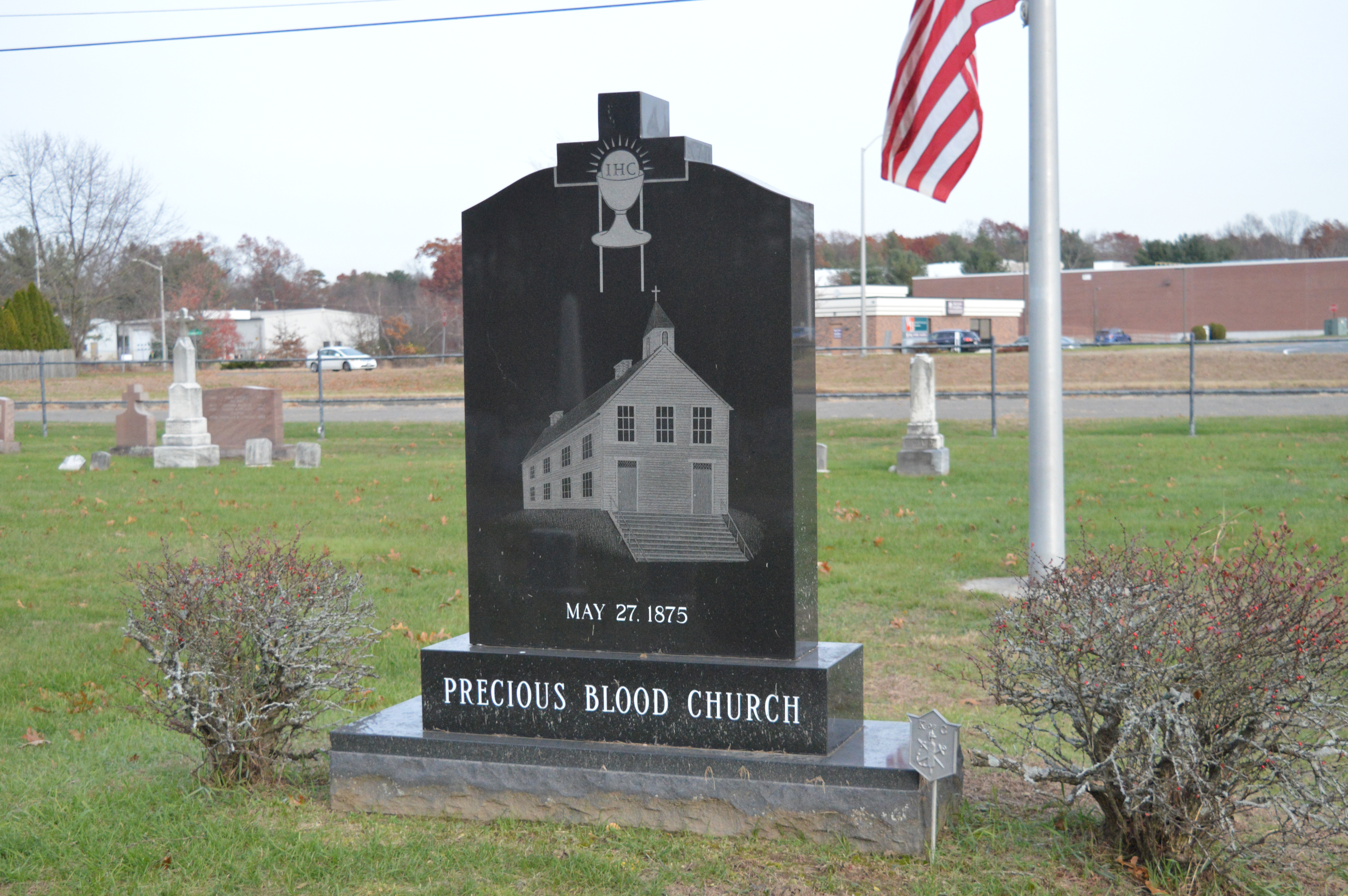
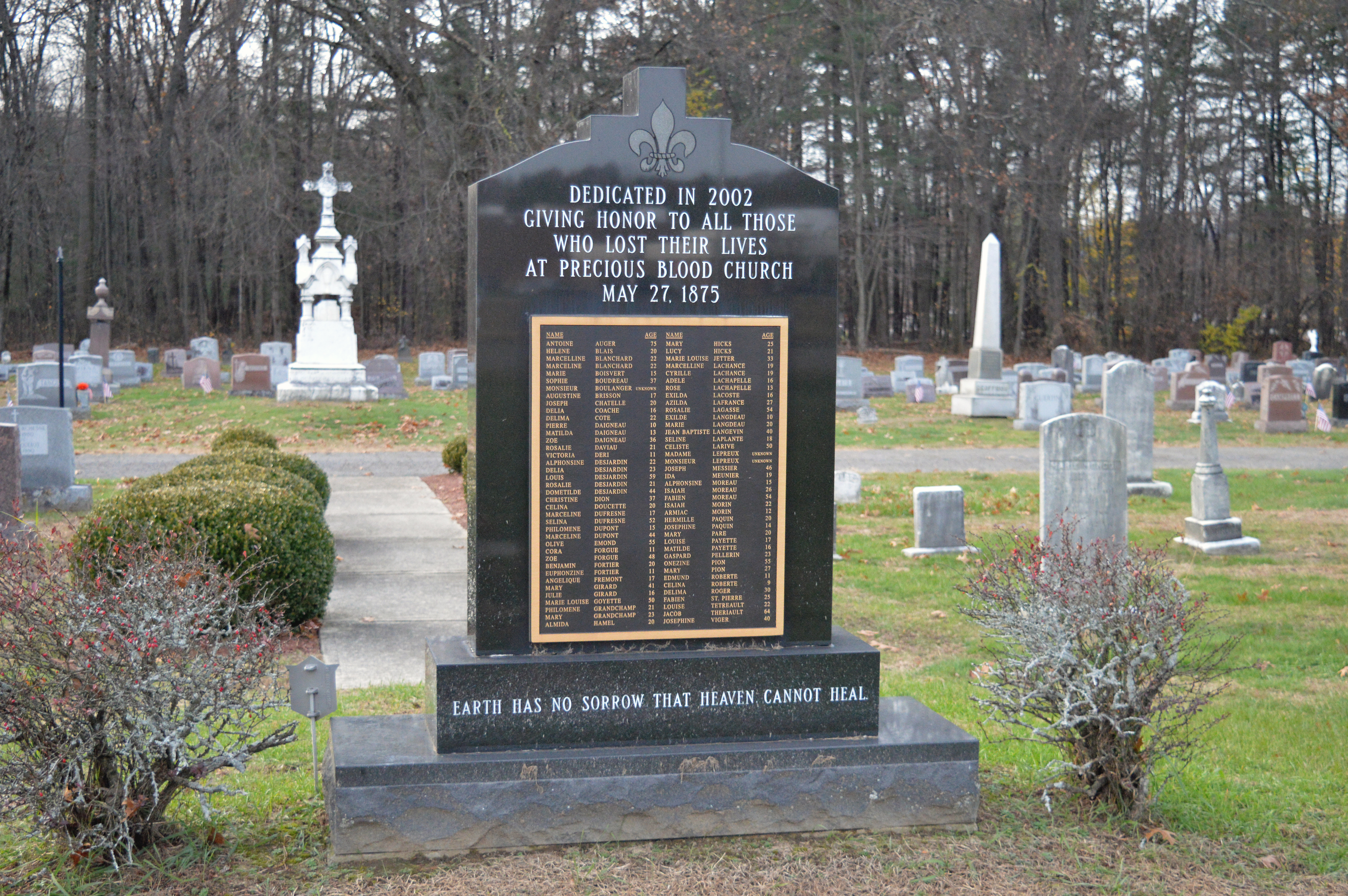
The Precious Blood Church Fire Memorial, erected in South Hadley in 2002, 127 years after the tragedy across from Father Dufresne's burial (who died of other causes in 1887), it remains the only memorial to the tragedy today

First Name	Last name	Age
Antoine	Auger	75
Helene	Blais	20
Marceline	Blanchard	22
Marcelline	Blanchard	22
Marie	Boisvert	15
Sophie	Boudreau	37
	Boulanger	
Augustine	Brisson	17
Joseph	Chatelle	20
Delia	Coache	16
Delima	Cote	22
Mathilde	Daigneau	13
Pierre	Daigneau	10
Zoe	Daigneau	36
Rosalie	Daviau	21
Victoria	Deri	11
Alphonsine	Desjardin	22
Delia	Desjardin	23
Dometilde	Desjardin	44
Louis	Desjardin	59
Rosalie	Desjardin	21
Christine	Dion	37
Celina	Doucette	20
Merceline	Dufresne	17
Selina	Dufresne	52
Marceline	Dupont	44
Philomene	Dupont	15
Olive	Emond	55
Cora	Forgue	11
Zoe	Forgue	48
Benjamin	Fortier	20
Euphonzine	Fortier	11
Angelique	Fremont	17
Julie	Girard	16
Mary	Girard	41
Marie Louise	Goyette	50
Mary	Grandchamp	23
Philomene	Grandchamp	21
Almida	Hamel	20
Lucy	Hicks	21
Mary	Hicks	25
Marie Louise	Jetter	33
Cyrille	Lachance	19
Marcelline	Lachance	19
Adele	Lachapelle	16
Rose	Lachapelle	13
Exilda	Lacoste	16
Azilda	LaFrance	27
Rosalie	Lagasse	54
Exilde	Langdeau	10
Marie	Langdeau	20
Jean Baptiste	Langevin	40
Seline	Laplante	18
Celiste	Larive	50
	Lepreux	
	Lepreux	
Joseph	Mercier	46
Ida	Meunier	19
Alphonsine	Moreau	15
Fabien	Moreau	54
Isaiah	Moreau	26
Armiac	Morin	12
Isaiah	Morin	22
Hermille	Paquin	20
Josephine	Paquin	14
Mary	Pare	20
Louise	Payette	17
Matilde	Payette	16
Gaspard	Pellerin	23
Mary	Pion	27
Onezine	Pion	55
Celine	Roberte	9
Edmund	Roberte	11
Delima	Roger	30
Fabien	St. Pierre	25
Louise	Tetreault	22
Jacob	Theriault	64
Josephine	Viger	40

== Injuries ==
First Name	Last name	Age	Injury Noted
	Adams		Hurt in the crowd
Theophile	Blanchard		Recovery doubtful
Louise	Brien		Recovery doubtful
Louis	Bolvin		Hand and head burned, will recover
J. B.	Benoit	24	Will recover
Frank	Boudreau		Slightly burned
Joseph	Boudreau		Arm broken
Charles	Brault		Head and arms badly burned
Sophie	Chicoine	63	Will recover
Prudent	Choquette		Recovery very doubtful
Louis	Clement		
Amy	Deri	14	Hands burned
Honora	Deri	17	Head and arms badly burned
Napoleon	Deri	14	Badly burned
Femi	Dion		Not severe
Cyrille	Dufresne	53	Doubtful [recovery]
Josephine	Dufresne	14	Will recover
Charles	Favreaux		Face and hands burned
Alex	Fortier	23	Will recover
Celina	Hebert	40	Slightly burned
Eveline	Houde	9	Will recover
Paul	Jetter		Face and hands badly burned
	Le Clerc		Will recover
Annie	Lapointe	15	Badly burned
John	Longchamp		Hands burned
Phebe	Longchamp		Badly burned
Lizzie	Messier		Will probably recover
Lucie	Regnier	18	Very doubtful [recovery]
Agise	Robert	14	Slightly burned
Joseph	Riel	29	Will recover
Mary	Riel	26	Will recover
Mary	Vachon	20	Leg broken
Charles	Vient		Hand badly burned

== See also ==
- List of disasters in Massachusetts by death toll
