= David La Haye =

Canadian actor (born 1966)

- Born: April 19, 1966 (age 58); Montreal, Quebec, Canada
- Occupation: Actor

David La Haye (born April 19, 1966) is a Canadian actor.

== Career ==
He began his career in films in Yves Simoneau's Dans le ventre du dragon opposite such veteran stars as Rémy Girard and Pierre Curzi. With piercing eyes and an intense physical style, La Haye emerged in the 1990s as one of the most versatile actors on the Quebec scene, winning a Genie Award for best actor in L’Enfant d’eau playing a mentally handicapped victim of a shipwreck in the South Sea Islands. He was also nominated for his deft comic turn as troubled photographer incapable of making a commitment in Soft Shell Man.

== Selected filmography ==
- 1989: In the Belly of the Dragon (Dans le ventre du dragon) .... Lou
- 1991: Nelligan .... Arthur de Bussières
- 1992: Montréal P.Q. (TV Series) .... Edmond Brisebois
- 1992: La Bête de foire .... Grégoire
- 1992: La Fenêtre .... Young Italian man
- 1993: Blanche (TV Series) .... Napoléon Frigon
- 1993: Les Amoureuses .... Bernard
- 1995: Water Child (L'Enfant d'eau) .... Emile
- 1996: Urgence (TV Series) .... Dr. Christian Richard
- 1996: Cosmos .... Morille
- 1997: Omerta 2, la loi du silence (TV Mini-Series) .... Rick Bonnard
- 1997: The Caretaker's Lodge (La Conciergerie) .... Charles Bass
- 1998: The Invitation (Short) .... Frédéric
- 1998: Chance or Coincidence .... Le Thief
- 1998: The Red Violin .... Handler (Montreal)
- 1999: Full Blast .... Steph
- 1999: Opération Tango
- 2000: The Courage to Love (TV Movie) .... Father Rousselon
- 2000: Nuremberg (TV Mini-Series) .... Kurt Kauffmann
- 2000: L'Invention de l'amour .... Antoine
- 2000: Méchant party .... Sylvain
- 2001: Un crabe dans la tête .... Alex
- 2001: Anazapta .... Jacques
- 2002: Fortier (TV Series) .... André Poupart
- 2002: Napoléon (TV Mini-Series) .... Duc d'Enghien
- 2003: Tempo .... Bayliss
- 2003: Timeline .... Arnaut's Deputy
- 2004: Ginger Snaps Back: The Beginning .... Claude
- 2004: Head in the Clouds .... Lucien
- 2004: Battle of the Brave (Nouvelle-France) .... François le Gardeur
- 2005: Life with My Father (La Vie avec mon père) .... Patrick
- 2006: The Beautiful Beast (La Belle bête) .... Lanz
- 2006: 1st Bite .... Gus
- 2007: Bluff .... Serge
- 2007: Muay Thai Chaiya .... Carlos
- 2008: Modern Love .... François
- 2008: Dirty money, l'infiltré .... Simon Wenger
- 2010: Cargo, les hommes perdus. .... Jo
- 2011: John A.: Birth of a Country (TV Movie) .... George-Étienne Cartier
- 2012: J'espère que tu vas bien .... Dave
- 2013: J'espère que tu vas bien 2 .... Dave
- 2014: Big Muddy .... Donovan Fournier
- 2015: Aurélie Laflamme: Les pieds sur terre .... Louis Brière
- 2015: On My Mother's Side (L'Origine des espèces) .... Pascale
- 2016: The Other Side of November (L'Autre côté de novembre) .... Dr. Michel
- 2017: Mohawk .... Jean Robichau
- 2017: Hochelaga, Land of Souls .... Alexis leblanc
- 2017: All You Can Eat Buddha .... Jean-Pierre Villeneuve / J-P Newtown
- 2017: Innocent
- 2017: Another Kind of Wedding .... Roy
- 2018: Bad Blood (TV Series) .... Alex
- 2020: The Corruption of Divine Providence ... Louis Séraphin
- 2020-21: Les Pays d'en haut - Curé Caron (12 episodes)
- 2021: Confessions of a Hitman (Confessions) - Donald Lemaire
- 2021: Wars (Guerres)
- 2022: Arlette - Paul Girouard
- 2024: Witchboard - Bishop Grogan

== Recognition ==
- 2005 Genie Award for Best Performance by an Actor in a Leading Role - Battle of the Brave (Nouvelle-France) - Nominated
- 2005 Jutra Award for Best Actor (Meilleur Acteur) - Nouvelle-France - Nominated
- 2002 Genie Award for Best Performance by an Actor in a Leading Role - Soft Shell Man (Un crabe dans la tête) - Nominated
- 2002 Jutra Award for Best Actor (Meilleur Acteur) - Un crabe dans la tête - Nominated
- 2001 Jutra Award for Best Actor (Meilleur Acteur) - Full Blast - Nominated
- 2001 Dallas OUT TAKES for Best Actor - Viens dehors! - Won
- 1996 Genie Award for Best Performance by an Actor in a Leading Role - L’Enfant d’eau - Won
