= Arthur de Bussières =

Canadian poet

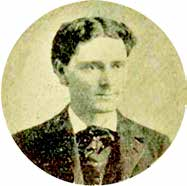
- Born: Arthur Bussières; January 20, 1877; Montreal, Quebec
- Died: May 7, 1913 (aged 36)
- Known for: poetry
- Notable work: Les Bengalis
- Movement: École littéraire de Montréal

Arthur de Bussières (January 20, 1877 – May 7, 1913) was a Canadian poet from Montreal, Quebec.

== Life ==
He was born in Montreal in 1877 to a poor family. There is evidence that his birth name was Arthur Bussières, and that the nobiliary particle "de" was later added as a pen name. He joined the École littéraire de Montréal in 1896 and became a close friend of Émile Nelligan, Charles Gill, Henry Desjardins, Albert Lozeau and Joseph Melançon.

Several of his early poems were published in anthologies edited by Louis Dantin, and later in journals including Le Monde illustré, Le Passe-Temps, L'Avenir, L'Étudiant, La Revue populaire, Les Débats, L'Alliance nationale and Anthologie des poètes canadiens. His writing style was generally labelled as Parnassian, and as most strongly influenced by José-Maria de Heredia. He supported himself primarily as a house painter, according to official sources; after Nelligan was committed to an insane asylum in 1899, Bussières virtually disappeared from the École littéraire, and published only a very small amount of work in the next decade until reemerging in 1910.

He had not published a standalone poetry collection as of 1913, when he died of appendicitis at age 36; the collection Les Bengalis, comprising all of his surviving poetry, was posthumously published in 1931.

== Legacy ==
Bussières is now best known for his role in historical investigation into the question of Nelligan's sexual orientation; there is circumstantial evidence but no definitive proof that the two men may have had a romantic or sexual relationship. Within the École littéraire de Montréal circle, it was widely believed that Nelligan was institutionalized because his mother discovered him and Bussières in flagrante delicto, but that rumor was not widely publicized until the late 20th-century and remains unsubstantiated. Bussières was also alleged by a contemporary, Jean-Aubert Loranger, to have supplemented his income as a house painter by also working as a male prostitute.

A biography of Bussières, Arthur de Bussières, poète, et l'École littéraire de Montréal, was published by Wilfrid Paquin in 1986.

== In popular culture ==
Bussières was portrayed by David La Haye in the 1991 biopic Nelligan.
