= Ellen Dannin =

American law professor

Ellen Dannin (1951 – November 6, 2023) was an American professor who taught and wrote primarily about American and New Zealand labor and employment law. She also wrote about privatization of government services and public infrastructure. Her last law school position was as the Fannie Weiss Distinguished Faculty Scholar and professor of law at Penn State Dickinson School of Law.

== Early life and education ==
Dannin was born in Flint, Michigan in 1951. The family moved to Frankfort, Indiana after her father, Arthur Dannin, finished his residency in Osteopathy. Her parents were divorced in 1957, and her mother Jean Dannin moved their three children to St. Paris, Ohio.

In 1975, Dannin received a Bachelor of Arts degree from the University of Michigan with High Honors and High Distinction, and the History Department's Best Thesis Award for a study of the 19th century women's suffrage and rights movement. In 1978, Dannin received a Juris Doctor degree with High Honors from the University of Michigan Law School. While in law school, she was an Administrative Editor for the University of Michigan Journal of Law Reform, the editor of the Women Law Student Association Newsletter, and a co-teaching fellow with Debra Armbruster for an undergraduate course—Women and the Law.

== Career ==
After law school, Dannin clerked for Cornelia G. Kennedy, a judge on the United States District Court for the Eastern District of Michigan in Detroit, Michigan. She clerked for Judge Kennedy from 1978 to 1979. When Kennedy was elevated in 1979 to the United States Court of Appeals for the Sixth Circuit, Dannin clerked for her for a second year (from 1979 to 1980).

From 1980 to 1991 Dannin was an attorney for the National Labor Relations Board (NLRB), in the seventh regional office in Detroit. During that period, she was appointed as a visiting professor at the Department of Commerce at Massey University in Palmerston North, New Zealand, and spent all of 1990 in New Zealand. From 1991 to 2002, she was a professor of law at California Western School of Law in San Diego, California.

In 1992, she took a leave of absence to spend a year as a scholar in residence at the Center for Industrial Relations (now known as the Centre for Labour, Employment and Work) at Victoria University of Wellington, New Zealand, and returned in 1994 as a scholar in residence in its Law Department. In 1996 she was a scholar in residence at the University of Otago in Dunedin, New Zealand, and held a similar position at the University of Waikato in Hamilton, New Zealand. She returned to Victoria University as a scholar in residence in 1997.

Concurrently with her position at California Western, she held a position as a visiting professor in the Program in Union Leadership and Administration at the University of Massachusetts Amherst from 1999 to 2002, and was a visiting professor of law at the University of Michigan in 2002. In 2002, she permanently left California Western and obtained an appointment as a professor of law at the Wayne State University Law School. She left Wayne State in 2006.

In the fall of 2006, she became a professor of law at the Dickinson School of Law at Pennsylvania State University. Dannin left Penn State Dickinson School of Law in 2013.

== Research interests ==
Dannin's research interests focus on United States labor law, New Zealand labour law, collective bargaining, privatization of infrastructure and of services, and legal education.

Dannin’s first book, Working Free: The Origins and Impact of New Zealand's Employment Contracts Act (1997), described the events that followed the enactment of the Employment Contracts Act (ECA) in 1991. The ECA upended the system of collective bargaining that had been in place since 1894, and reduced workers’ ability to bargain collectively on their own behalf. There were large demonstrations against the ECA and talk of a general strike. However, there was insufficient power to pull off the general strike. The last half of the book describes the various effects the ECA had in creating a new form of employee–employer relationships.

Dannin's most recent book is Taking Back the Workers' Law: How to Fight the Assault on Labor Rights, with a foreword by former Congressman David E. Bonior (2006). This book discusses court and NLRB rulings that have, in her view, undermined the National Labor Relations Act (NLRA) by stacking the deck against employees in their negotiations with employers. Among these are rulings on replacement of striking workers and implementation upon impasse (the doctrine that, at an impasse in negotiations, the employer may unilaterally implement their last offer). Dannin argues that labor attorneys should show the courts how these rulings undermine the goals that Congress wrote into Section 1 of the NLRA; these goals include equality of bargaining power between employees and employers, and the right of employees to join unions and to bargain collectively over terms and conditions of employment.

Dannin also studied and wrote about privatization. In order to protect investors in toll roads, many highway privatization contracts contain noncompete clauses that reduce speed limits and impose restrictions on improvements to other nearby roads. Dannin argued that when public assets such as highways and parking meters are privatized, noncompete and other clauses reduce accountability to the public because private entities are given power over policies that were previously made by elected officials.

In addition to articles in scholarly journals, Dannin has used blogging as a way to inform people about employment rights, unions, privatization, and conservative ideology, including ALEC and the Reason Foundation. Dannin also co-wrote a 21-part series with law professor Ann C. Hodges about judicial rulings that, they argue, have weakened the NLRA.

== Memberships ==
Dannin has been a member of a number of professional organizations, including the American Bar Association, State Bar of Michigan, Labor and Employment Relations Association (LERA), Law and Society Association, United Association for Labor Education, and the Association of American Law Schools.

For 15 years, Dannin was the editor of the LERA newsletter, Labor and the Law (now Labor and Employment Law News), a publication widely read by academics, lawyers and labor movement activists.

She was an advisor to or reviewer for the Labor Law Journal, Berkeley Journal of Employment and Labor Law, Labor Studies Journal, Law and Society Review, WorkingUSA, and the Journal of Socio-Economics. She was Co-Chair, Collaborative Research Network 8 on Labor Rights, Law and Society Association 2003- 2013. She has also been a consultant for the United States Department of Labor (1987), U.S. General Accounting Office Workplace Quality Issues Panel (2003), and the New Zealand Department of Labour (1997).

== Published works ==
=== Books ===
- Working Free: The Origins and Impact of New Zealand's Employment Contracts Act. Auckland, New Zealand: Auckland University Press, 1997. ISBN 978-1-86940-174-0
- Taking Back the Workers' Law: How to Fight the Assault on Labor Rights. Ithaca, N.Y.: Cornell University Press, 2006. ISBN 978-0-8014-4438-8

=== Edited works ===
- The Developing Labor Law: The Board, the Courts, and the National Labor Relations Act. 4th ed. Patrick Hardin, et al., eds. Ellen Dannin, et al., contr. Eds. Washington, D.C.: BNA Books, 2005. ISBN 1-57018-505-0
