= Dantin =

Dantin is a surname. Notable people with the surname include:

- Louis Dantin (1865–1945), Canadian writer and editor
- Maurice Dantin (died 2012), American attorney and politician
- Michel Dantin (born 1960), French politician
