= Jean Chatillon =

Canadian composer (1937–2019)

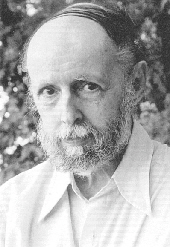

Background information
- Born: 13 September 1937; Nicolet, Quebec, Canada
- Died: 16 January 2019 (aged 81) Trois-Rivières, Quebec, Canada
- Occupations: Composer; Musician; Educator
- Instrument: Piano
- Website: jeanchatillon.com

Jean Chatillon (13 September 1937 – 16 January 2019) was a Canadian composer and music educator.

== Early life ==
Jean Chatillon was born into a family of musicians on 13 September 1937 in Nicolet, Quebec. In 1951, he began to play piano and to compose. Initially self-taught, he undertook serious musical studies with the master Conrad Letendre in Montreal.

== Career ==
In 1969, he founded the Music Section of the University of Quebec at Trois-Rivières and taught there until 1981. In 1970, he was a founding member of the "Institut de sciences musicales Conrad Letendre", along with Michel Perrault.

After his retirement from teaching in 1981, he dedicated himself fully to his art.

Chatillon wrote more than 300 musical and literary works. He was an Associate Composer of the Canadian Music Centre. In 2003, he was appointed Professor Emeritus by the University of Quebec.

In January 2004, he became a founding member of the Delian Society, which is dedicated to the renaissance of tonal music.

Chatillon died on 16 January 2019 in Trois-Rivières.
