= Municipal government of Montreal =

Local governance in Montreal, Canada

City of Montreal Ville de Montréal
- Municipal government
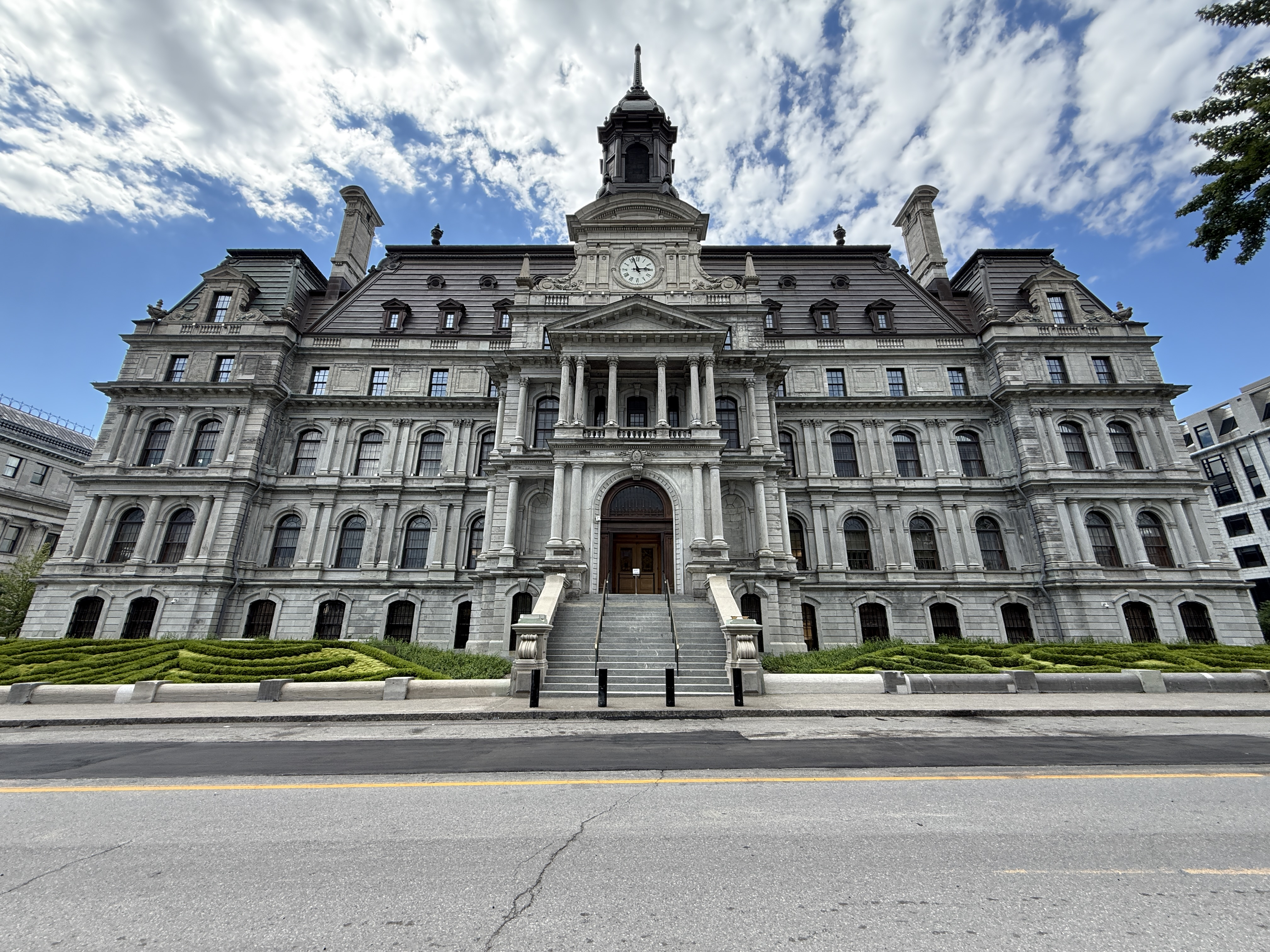
- Municipal logo Montreal City Hall, the seat of government
- Type: City with a mayor-council system
- Website: montreal.ca

Montreal Executive Committee
- Mayor: Soraya Martinez Ferrada

Montreal City Council
- Head of council: Soraya Martinez Ferrada
- Membership: 1 mayor; 64 city councillors
- Appointed by: Direct election every four years
- Seat: Montreal City Hall

The municipal government of Montreal is composed of a borough council, a city council and an agglomeration council. Councillors are members of municipal political parties and are elected by the citizens. The executive committee is appointed by the mayor.

== Montreal City Council ==
The Montreal City Council is the governing body of Montreal. It is the main organisational body of the City of Montreal. It establishes the political lines of the city's government and approves regulations of municipal application. The main decisions in areas like public security, intergovernmental relations, urban regeneration, environment and urban planning should be approved by the council. The 64 councillors are elected by direct universal suffrage in a majority system and have a mandate of four years.

== Mayor of Montreal ==
The head of the city government is the mayor of Montreal, Soraya Martinez Ferrada who is first among equals in the Montreal City Council. The mayor has municipal executive power. Supervises, manages and controls all of the City administration. The Mayor is elected by direct universal suffrage in a majority system. The Mayor's four-year mandate coincides with that of the Montreal City Council.

== Executive committee ==
Executive Committee is an organ that depends on the Montreal City Council and which has its own decision-making powers. Is responsible for preparing different documents, such as budgets, contracts, subsidies, financial resources management, regulations, etc., subject to the approval of the City Council. This Council may delegate other powers to the executive committee. The Executive Council has currently twelve members, all appointed by the Mayor of Montreal.

== Borough councils ==
The city of Montreal is divided into 19 boroughs (in French, arrondissements), each with a mayor and council. Borough-based organisations that assume part of the following authorities in their own territorial spheres: urban planning, solid waste collection, culture, social and community development, parks, cleaning, housing, human resources, fire prevention and financial management.

== Municipal political parties ==
- Équipe Denis Coderre pour Montréal
- Projet Montréal
- Vrai changement pour Montréal
- Coalition Montréal
- Mouvement Montreal
