= La Survivance =

La Survivance is an expression used by French Canadians denoting the phlegmatic survival of francophone culture, typically in the face of Canadian anglophone or Anglo-American hegemony. It was used frequently in Quebec, especially before the Quiet Revolution of the 1960s, but also found expression among the culturally dispossessed francophone mill workers of northern New England, from the 19th century on.

== See also ==
- History of Quebec
- Timeline of Quebec history
