= Labor Law Journal =

Journal about labor issues

- Discipline: Labour law, Business and management, American law
- Language: English

Publication details
- History: 1949–present
- Publisher: Wolters Kluwer (United States)
- Frequency: Quarterly

Standard abbreviations
- Bluebook: Lab. L.J.
- ISO 4: Labor Law J.

Indexing
- ISSN: 0023-6586
- OCLC no.: 1755405

The Labor Law Journal features articles regarding labor law, labor-management relations, labor economics, and employment discrimination in the United States.

The journal publishes articles which cover a wide variety of topics in labor relations, including court decisions, federal and state labor regulations, labor-management relations, equal employment opportunity law and practice, on-the-job safety and health, and employment training.

The target audience for the journal is academics, practicing attorneys, employers, and human resources managers.

The Labor Law Journal was founded in 1949, and is published quarterly by Wolters Kluwer Legal & Regulatory US, formerly Commerce Clearing House, Inc.
