= Danin (name) =

Danin is a male given name and surname. As a South-Slavic given name, it has a female counterpart, Danina.

== Given name ==
- Danin Talović (born 1995), Montenegrin footballer
- Danina Jeftić, Serbian actress
- Assur-danin-pal (8th century BC), son of the king of Assyria, Shalmaneser III

== Surname ==
- A. Danin, pen name of Arkady Kots (1872–1943), Russian Jewish poet
- Daniil Danin (1914–2000), Russian author and popularizer of science
- Eliran Danin (born 1984), Israeli footballer
- Ezra Danin (1903–1984), Israeli intelligence officer and politician

== Other ==
- Ainina and Danina, pre-Christian female deities worshipped in ancient Iberia
