= Louis Dantin =

Canadian writer and editor

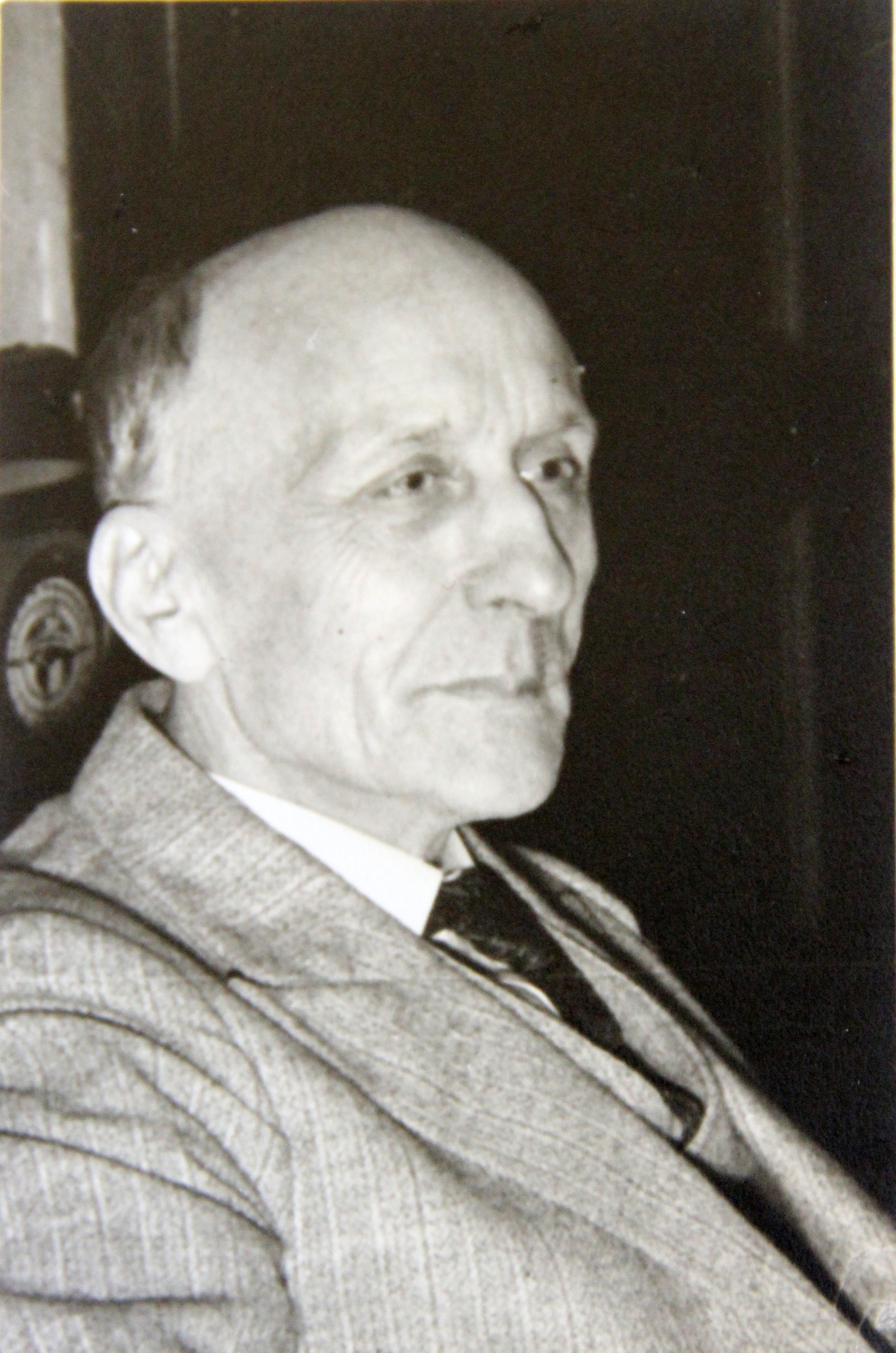
- Born: Eugène Seers; November 28, 1865; Beauharnois, Canada East
- Died: January 17, 1945 (aged 79); Boston, Massachusetts
- Education: Collège de Montréal
- Occupations: writer, editor
- Spouse: Clotilde Lacroix
- Writing career
- Language: French
- Period: 1920s–1940s
- Genres: poetry, novels, essays
- Notable work: Poètes de l'Amérique française

Louis Dantin was the pen name of Eugène Seers (November 28, 1865 – January 17, 1945), a Canadian writer and editor from Quebec. He is historically most noted as the original editor and publisher of the poetry of Émile Nelligan, although he also published numerous works as a poet, novelist and essayist in his own right.

== Life ==
Originally from Beauharnois, Quebec, he studied at the Collège de Montréal and later attended seminary to become a Roman Catholic priest. Associated with the Congregation of the Blessed Sacrament, he wrote religious poetry and short stories during that era. He was later associated with the École littéraire de Montréal, becoming acquainted there with writers such as Émile Nelligan and Arthur de Bussières. He subsequently left the priesthood in 1903, marrying Clotilde Lacroix and moving to Boston, Massachusetts, where he worked as a printer for Harvard University Press. He resided in Boston for the remainder of his life, although he continued to publish French language literary work in Quebec. Most of his published work was as an essayist and critic, including volumes such as Poètes de l'Amérique française (1928) and Gloses critiques (1931), although he also published a volume of poetry (Le Coffret de Crusoé, 1932) and a posthumous novel (Les Enfances de Fanny, 1951). Several volumes of his correspondence with other Quebec writers were also published, as well as several posthumous volumes of poetry from his archives.

== Controversy ==
Two writers, Claude-Henri Grignon in his 1936 Les Pamphlets de Valdombre and Yvette Francoli in her 2013 Le Naufragé du Vaisseau d'or, have alleged that Dantin was the actual author of most of the poetry that is credited to Nelligan. Dantin denied Grignon's claims in several of his letters to other writers. In 2016, the University of Ottawa's literary journal, @nalyses, published an article by Annette Hayward and Christian Vandendorpe that rejected the claim based on textual comparisons of the poetry that is credited to Nelligan with Dantin's writings. In 2021, Pierre Hébert arrived at the same conclusion in his Une biochronique on Dantin.

== Works ==
- 1928: Poètes de l'Amérique française
- 1930: La Vie en rêve
- 1930: Chanson javanaise
- 1930: Le Mouvement littéraire dans les Cantons de l'Est
- 1931: Gloses critiques
- 1932: Le Coffret de Crusoé
- 1932: Chanson intellectuelle
- 1936: Contes de Noël
- 1937: Je me souviens
- 1951: Les Enfances de Fanny
- 1962: Poèmes d'outre-tombe
- 1963: Un Manuscrit retrouvé à Kor-El-Fantin
- 1963: Les Sentiments d'un père affectueux
- 2000: L'Abîme hospitalier
- 2002: Essais critiques
- 2003: La triste histoire de Li-Hung Fong et autres poèmes
