= History of the Franco-Americans in Holyoke, Massachusetts =

French people in Holyoke
les Holyokais franco-américains
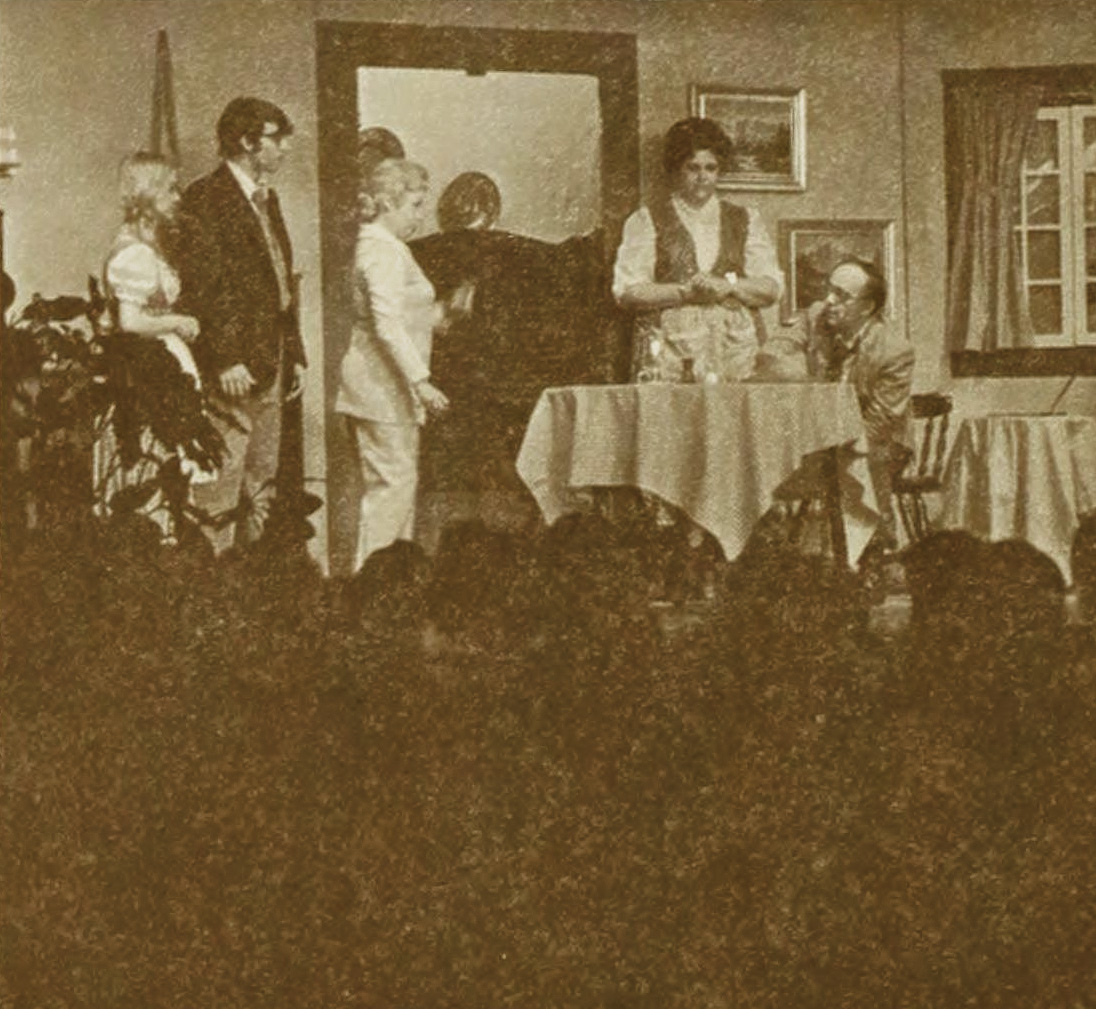
- Le Cercle Rochambeau drama troupe performing a play for the city centennial, 1973

Total population
- 3,657 (2010)

Languages
- American English; Quebec French; New England French

During the late 19th and early 20th centuries Holyoke saw an influx of Franco-Americans (French: les Holyokais franco-américains, lit. "the French-American Holyokians"), (Note: The translation of the word "Holyokais(e)" more closely resembles "Holyokian", a demonym also used in French, than "Holyoker", as its suffix is comparable to "Bostonnais", which literally translates to Bostonian.) predominantly French-Canadians, who immigrated to Massachusetts to work in the city's growing textile and paper mills. By 1900, 1 in 3 people in Holyoke were of French-Canadian descent, and a 1913 survey of French Americans in the United States found Holyoke, along with other Massachusetts cities, to have a larger community of French or French-Canadian born residents than those of New Orleans or Chicago at that time. Initially faced with discrimination for the use of their labor by mill owners to undermine unionization, as well as for their creation of separate French institutions as part of the La Survivance movement, this demographic quickly gained representation in the city's development and civic institutions. Holyoke was at one time a cultural hub for French-Canadian Americans; the Saint-Jean-Baptiste Society of America was first organized in the city in 1899, along with a number of other institutions, including theater and drama societies from which famed vaudevillian Eva Tanguay was first discovered, and regular publications, with its largest French weekly newspaper, La Justice, published from 1904 to 1964. The city was also home to author Jacques Ducharme, whose 1943 book The Shadows of the Trees, published by Harper, was one of the first non-fiction English accounts of New England's French and French-Canadian diaspora.

A changing industrial economy, Americanization, and emigration to the suburbs led to demographic decline, and by 1990 this population had dropped to about 16% of the population, and as of the 2010 US Census this demographic represented less than 10% of residents. In contrast, the demographic's suburbanization is reflected in 2010 Census figures as well, as Hampden County respondents who identified as French (12.7%) or French Canadian (5.5%) represented 18.2% of the population, the county's largest group by ancestry were the two taken as a whole. In 2015, the American Community Survey estimated less than 1 percent of all residents of Holyoke spoke some form of French or French Creole.

== History ==
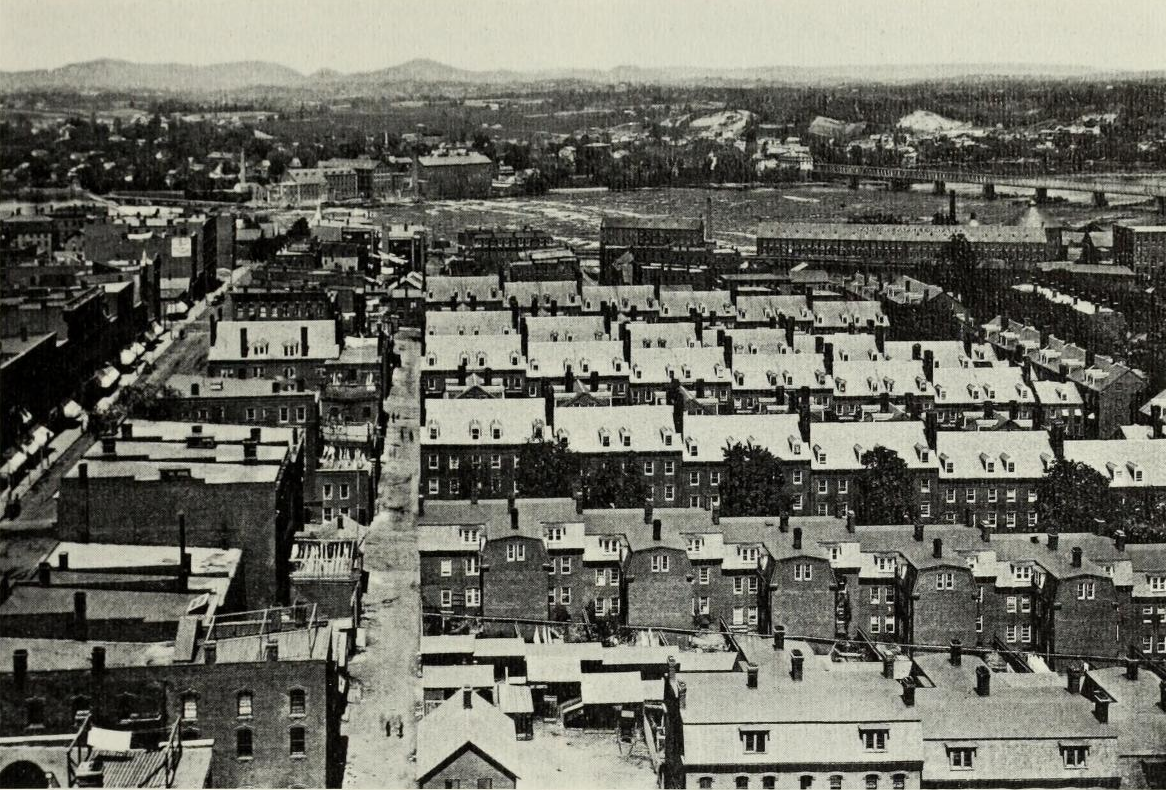
The Lyman Mills worker housing, a dense neighborhood of rowhouses where many French-Canadian millworkers got their start in Holyoke; substandard housing conditions led to its razure and reconstruction as Lyman Terrace in the early 20th century

Historical Franco-American Population of Holyoke
Year	Residents	Percent Total Pop. (%)
1865	≈250	≈5%
1900	≈13,000	≈28.4%
1913	14,279	22.9%
1936	12,900	22.6%
2010 (Note: French and French-Canadian respondents)	3,657	9.2%

=== Quebec émigrés and early settlement ===
The first French to settle on the shores of the Connecticut River in Ireland Parish reportedly arrived in the early 1850s, and were only identified as the "Gallaudet brothers", whose year of settlement remains unknown, and one Jean-Baptiste Boulet who arrived in 1854. Boulet would serve Mass at St. Jerome's Church from 1856 until 1859 when he went west to Oregon, to join the priesthood as a missionary.

With the rapid industrialization of the area around the Holyoke Dam, many new families arrived in search of work; among them were the Stebbins, Taces, Provosts, Viens, Francœurs, Hamels, and Proulx. Holyoke's French history largely began with one Nicholas Proulx (French: [pʁu], anglicized as "Pru", "Prue", or "Prew"), who originally arrived with his family in Mittineague in 1852, briefly returning to Quebec before arriving in Holyoke in 1858. By this time the Lyman Mills spooling factory which had been funded by the city's original backers, the Boston Associates, had fallen into receivership with the Panic of 1857 and acquired new owners who sought to fill a labor shortage when business improved in 1858. By 1859 Proulx had won the confidence of chief agent of the mill, Jones S. Davis, who contracted a four-horse covered wagon to be built to bring laborers back from villages in Quebec such as Proulx's native Saint-Ours. For this work Davis would provide transportation costs and $4–5 for each worker. Accompanied by his sons on several subsequent trips, Proulx's first was sometime during the autumn of 1859, and lasted a week, after which he was arrived in Holyoke with 45 young women and 6 or 7 young men. While resting, he and the workers would sleep in Vermont fields by night, at one point being surrounded by villagers while staying in an unknown farmer's barn; after explaining their situation and paying the owner, they were allowed to remain for the night. Over the next 5 years Proulx would bring an estimated 500 Quebecois workers to Holyoke, until industrial demand from the Civil War led to the construction of rail directly from Montreal by 1868. Many subsequent French immigrants would arrive in the States with their first stop at the H. H. Richardson train station, built in 1884.

=== Mass migration and exclusion ===
Distribution of Franco-Americans in Western Massachusetts, 1900; Holyoke being the only city shown with more than 10,000 French residents at the time, comprising more than 20% of its populace

With the continued arrival of French Canadians during the Civil War, many chose not to pursue naturalization to prevent enlistment, though stories existed of both French taking advantage of the quota system, and being taken advantage of by Union recruiters. A Springfield Republican article for January 28, 1864, reported an "order [was] issued for the arrest of the Frenchmen who could 'parley-vouz'^{[sic]} in English as well as anybody before they enlisted on Holyoke's quota, but grew very Frenchy after they were sent to camp, and were discharged because they couldn't understand what the officers said". Conversely in cases where Québécois could genuinely not understand English, at times émigrés would sign agreements in Canada, only to arrive in Holyoke to find an officer waiting for them, having unknowingly signed enlistment papers.

A mass exodus of Quebec workers began after the Civil War with most in higher density textile manufacturing towns, such as Holyoke, as well as Gardner, Lowell, and Fall River. As the French-Canadians arrived in Holyoke in the 1880s, unlike many industrial cities with one or two large employers or institutions, their arrival coincided with the construction of dozens of mills in multiple industries. In less than 30 years the city population tripled in size to 35,000 residents, and with this social structures saw dramatic change. Indeed the influx of Canadian French in Holyoke was attributed to the city having an average of 12 residents per household in 1885, twice the Massachusetts average. During this period, much of The Flats (Wards 1 and 2) became known as "Frenchville."

"Let's go on a beautiful summer's evening in one of the great manufacturing centers of the states, in Holyoke, for example ... Noisy bursts of laughter from all over the place warn you that this people is not gnawed by melancholy on the alien earth, in the houses we hear the gay chorus of the songs of Canada, and the windows are lined with flowers above which appear the good and frank figures of Canadian women who look and babble."
Original in French
"Rendons-nous, par un beau soir d'été, dans l'un des grands centres manufacturiers des États, à Holyoke, par exemple... De bruyants éclats de rire, venus d'un peu partout, vous avertissent que ce peuple n'est pas rongé par la mélancolie sur la terre étrangère. Dans les maisons, on entend les gais refrains des chansons du Canada, et les fenêtres sont bordées de fleurs au-dessus desquelles apparaissent les bonnes et franches figures de Canadiennes qui regardent et babillent."
—Édouard Hamon, in Les Canadiens-Français de la Nouvelle-Angleterre (1891)
"French Americans have been severely criticised [sic] for years past because of their insistence that knowledge of the French language be a paramount consideration with them in the United States. There is little justice in that criticism. Any citizen who knows two languages is better equipped to meet the needs of life than a citizen who only knows one."
—Anonymous letter to the editor in The Bulletin (Norwich), 1925

The influx of Québécois also led to considerable tensions between them and an Irish demographic that had born the brunt of Anti-Irish sentiment and had only seen gradual improvements in labor conditions through early union organizing, as the Canadians worked longer hours for lower wages and fractured the labor community with their language barrier. In his history of Holyoke's Franco-American immigrants, The Shadows of the Trees, Jacques Ducharme described that "many [French] were to feel the caillou celtique, or 'Kelly Biscuit,' for in the early days the Irish were not averse to violence by way of showing their distaste for the newcomers." The same could be said the English population as well, with one 1888 incident in the New York Herald describing a baseball game between Holyoke French and "American" boys ending with one of the latter running home only to return with a rifle, resulting in a French boy being struck with a non-fatal shot to the neck. In her 1957 treatise American Cities in the Growth of the Nation, Constance Green described this feud as influenced by "[Holyoke's Protestant] Americans nourish[ing] faint and vain hopes that differences between the French-speaking Catholics and the English-speaking Irish would cancel out each other's influence. The prolonged perpetuation of this feud stemmed partly from Yankee guilt." Tensions in the mills shaped contests among youth that lasted until the beginning of the 20th century, dissipating as groups integrated and gradually gained newfound acceptance. The promise of jobs higher paying than those of Quebec farms, coupled with demand for cheap labor, led the city's French to surpass the population characterizing Holyoke's traditional name of "Ireland Parish" in three decades. In 1870 their population was 40% smaller than the Irish demographic; by 1880 their total exceeded this demographic by 16%. Many remained excluded from labor unions and in turn created a system of nepotism in area mills, until new waves of lower-wage immigrants began to compete with them in the mid-20th century. Although in the French-Canadian community would become part of the labor community in the decades after its arrival, indeed eventually sharing leadership posts of the Irish-founded Eagle Lodge of Paper Makers, at one time it wasn't uncommon for three generations of a French Holyoke family to work in the same mill at the same station.

In civic exchanges the culturally dispossessed French adopted the La Survivance practice of establishing separate institutions preserving their language and culture. This led to the development of many such institutions in Holyoke's history, however this also led to backlash from both the city and Commonwealth government in the 19th century. The separation of French from English-speaking Irish parishes stood since their arrival, as few would attend the mass at St. Jerome's parish. By 1869 Irish Catholics, finding several French girls receiving tutorage in English at a Protestant congregation, ultimately pushed for the creation of the French parishes, namely the Church of the Precious Blood (L'Eglise du Précieux-Sang). In 1880 the first French school opened in Holyoke, under the auspices of the Precious Blood Church parish, but not before receiving complaints from residents that the school could not operate, due to a law mandating schools teach in English. Father Dufresne, who led the new school, ultimately convinced the city's industrialist backers to not allow it to close, stating it did teach both English and French, and that its closure would lead to an exodus of workers. This desire to open separate institutions was also met with derision by the Massachusetts Bureau of Labor Statistics in 1881, when bureau chief Carroll D. Wright published the following passage in his annual report-

"With some exceptions the Canadian French are the Chinese of the Eastern States. They care nothing for our institutions, civil, political, or educational...They are a horde of industrial invaders, not a stream of stable settlers. Voting with all that it implies, they care nothing about. Rarely does one of them become naturalized. They will not send their children to school if they can help it, but endeavor to crowd them into the mills at the earliest possible age...These people have one good trait. They are indefatigable workers, and docile... they must have some amusements; and so far as the males are concerned, drinking and smoking and lounging constitute the sum of these. Now it is not strange that so sordid and low a people should awaken corresponding feelings in the managers..."

The phrase "Chinese of the Eastern States", often shortened to "Chinese of the East", reflected not only the era's racial attitudes toward Chinese Americans but also stood in the context of the Chinese Exclusion Act of 1882, prohibiting the immigration of all Chinese laborers, who were predominantly found on the Western frontier, until 1943. Wright's words would lead to a very public backlash by the Franco-American community throughout the state; indeed the Massachusetts legislature held hearings with representatives from different French cultural groups throughout the Commonwealth. Ultimately Wright never renounced his statement, but eventually amended it, adding "no other nationality has developed as rapidly and in as satisfactory a manner on coming to this country"; his 1881 report would shape public discourse in Massachusetts for more than four decades.

=== Integration and early representation ===
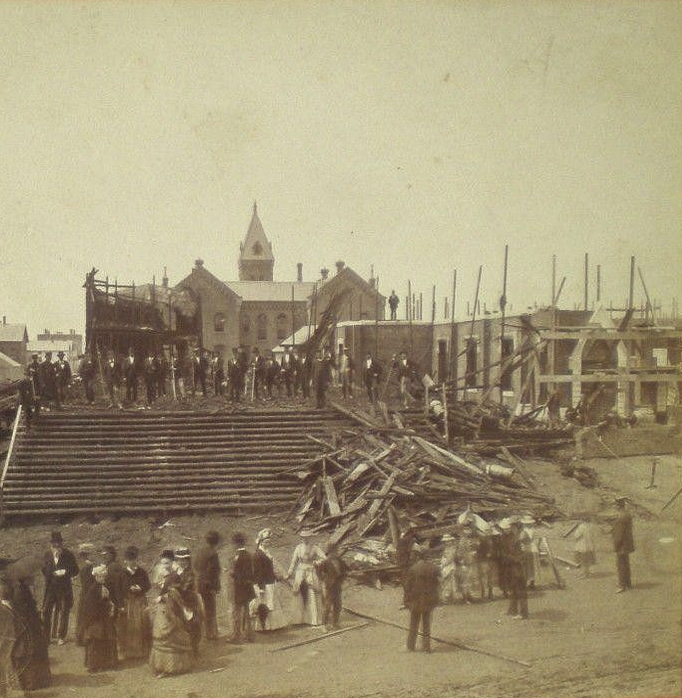
The charred ruins of the first Precious Blood Church c. June 1875; the new building appears under construction to the right, with the Loreto House of Providence Ministries visible in the background, used at one time as the Precious Blood School

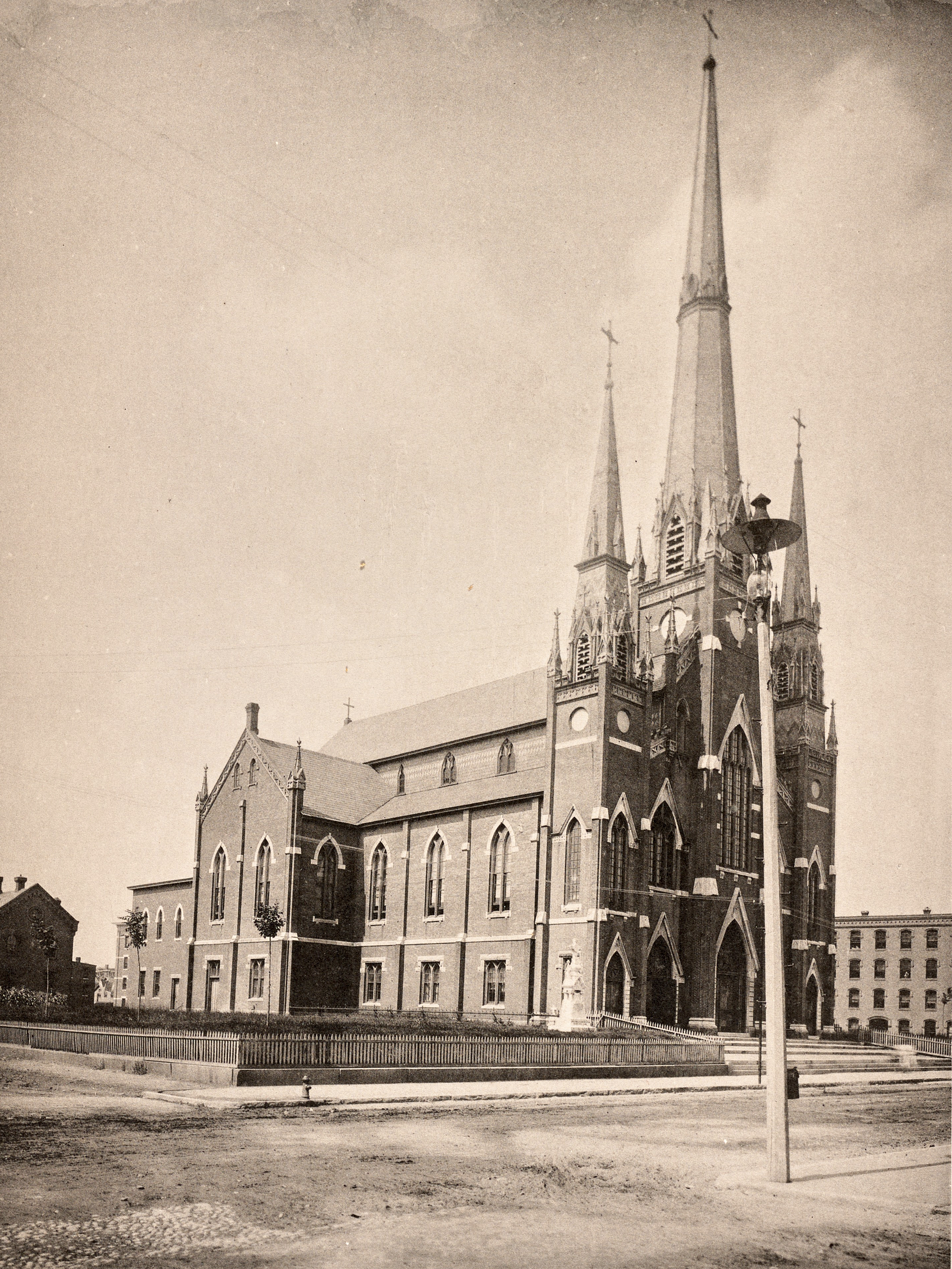
The second building of the Precious Blood Church, a.k.a. L'Eglise du Precieux Sang, 1891

Although tensions remained between the French and the broader Holyoke community, an early collective moment of support came in 1875 in the wake of the Precious Blood Church fire, which received international coverage, being called "The Holyoke Disaster" in some newspapers as far away as California and Somerset, England. The fire, which began when a breeze blew a piece of lace draped over the Blessed Virgin Mary into a lit candle, killed 78 French parishioners, with many injured during the stampede that crushed several in the church's narrow exit. Out of the disaster came the hero Fireman John T. Lynch who, being doused with a firehose by a fellow comrade, rushed the entrance of the church and pulled parishioners from the bodies that had amassed by the church's front stairway. At the turn of the 20th century it was still described by historian Alfred Copeland, who published a multi-volume history of Hampden County, as "the most serious disaster in Holyoke history and never can be forgotten".

While the first generations of French-Canadians and French remained separated from Holyoke's establishment by culture, language, and status, throughout the end of the 19th and early 20th centuries they gradually integrated with the community in civic, commercial, and social life. At the turn of the 20th century, a considerable community of French-speakers lived in the area's Flats neighborhood, as well as north of downtown amongst a growing Polish population.

In time, the French community organized in drama circles in local churches and theaters. The most famous among French-Canadian performers from Holyoke was Eva Tanguay, born in Marbleton, Quebec in 1878, her family arriving in Holyoke before 1885. Performing a song and dance number in Parsons Hall as a young girl, she was discovered by a touring company before 1890, and would go on to become a national celebrity in the new era of American mass-media celebrity, becoming known as "The Queen of Vaudeville", and defining a genre of "big personality" celebrity which led to a number of impersonators.

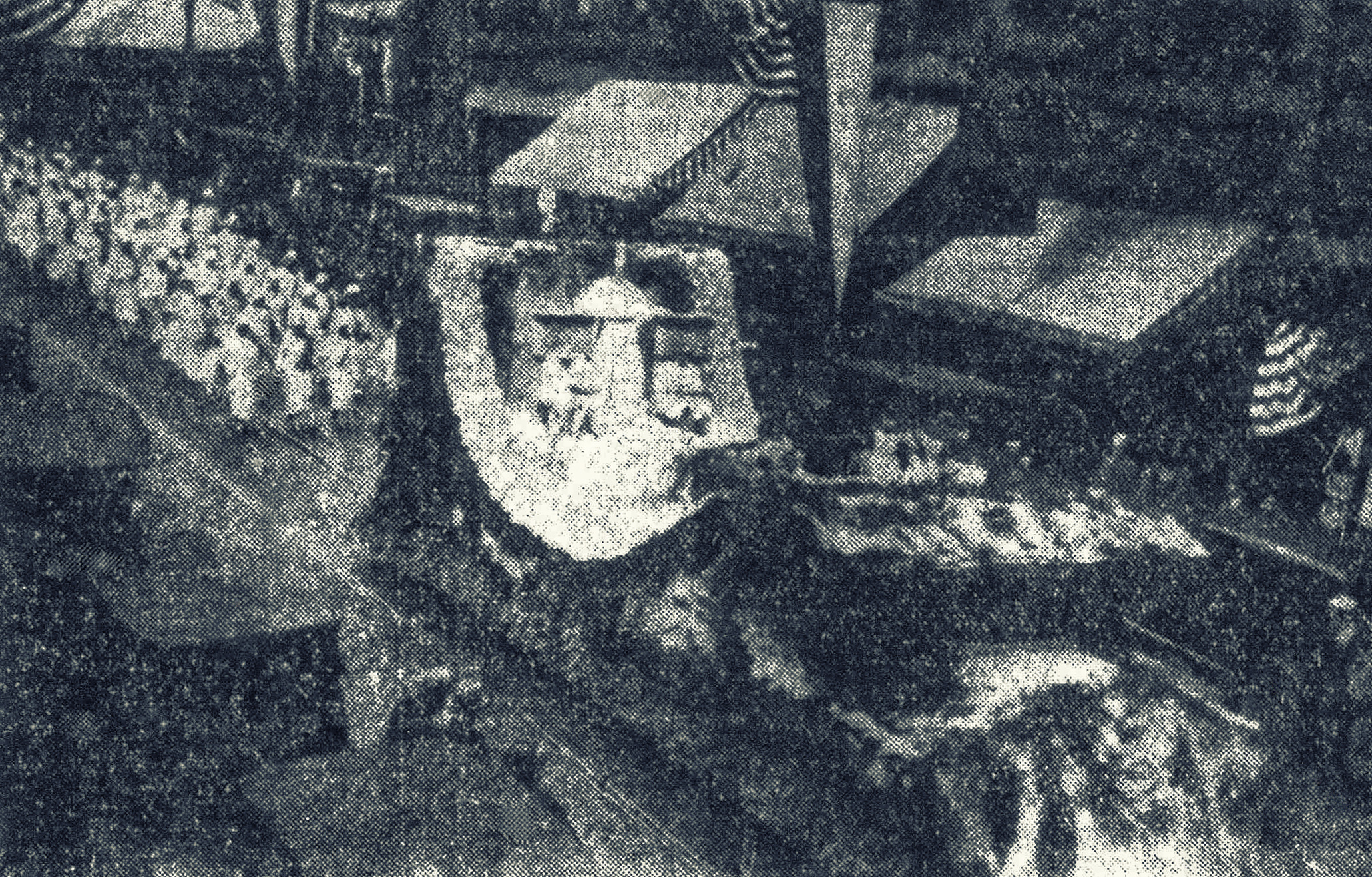
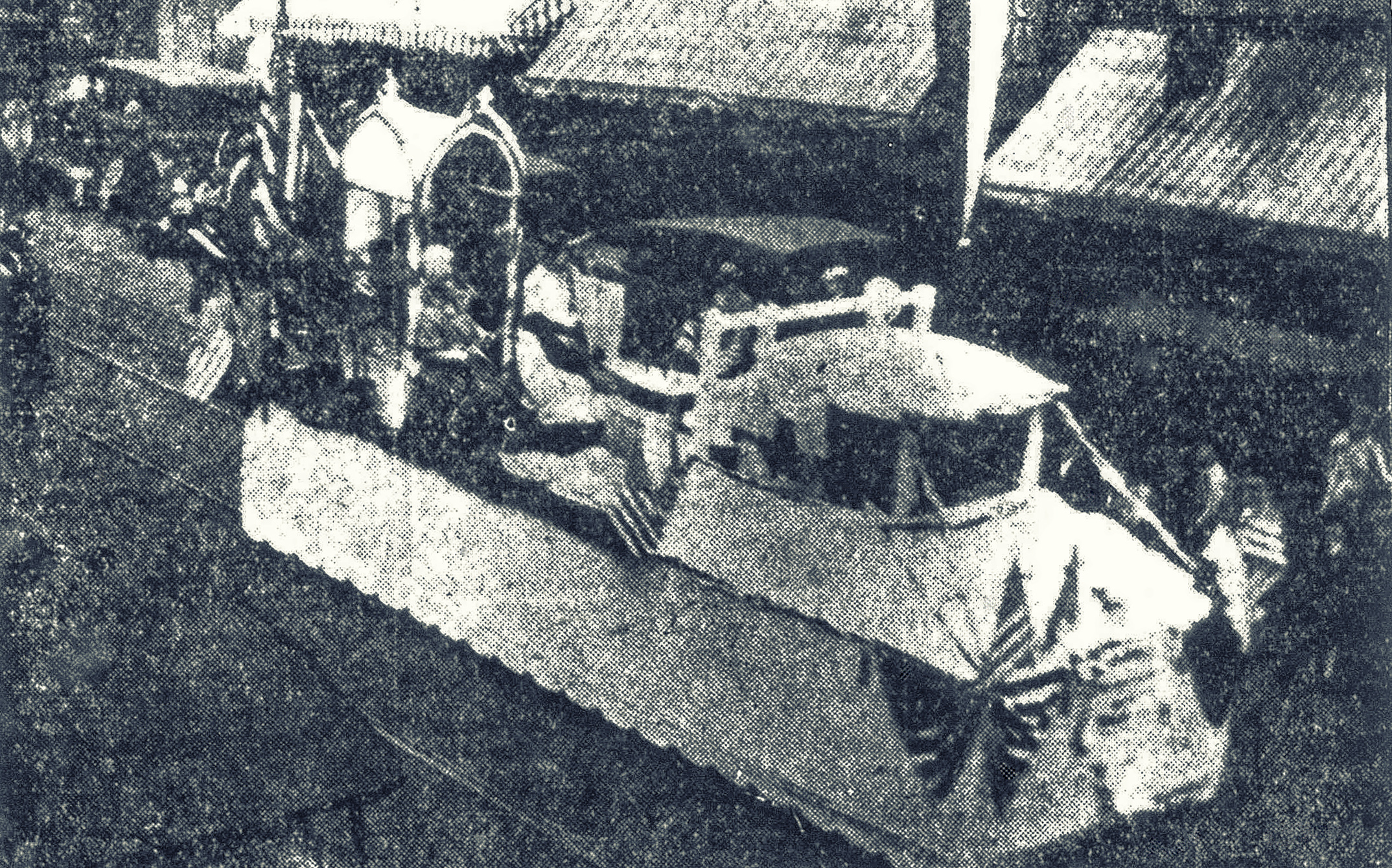
Floats and a procession of delegations pass Main Street storefronts during the Saint-Jean-Baptiste Society Parade of October 1925, when more than 5,000 participants converged on Holyoke for a national meeting celebrating the 25th anniversary of the founding of the Union Saint-Jean-Baptiste d’Amerique by Holyoke's own chapter

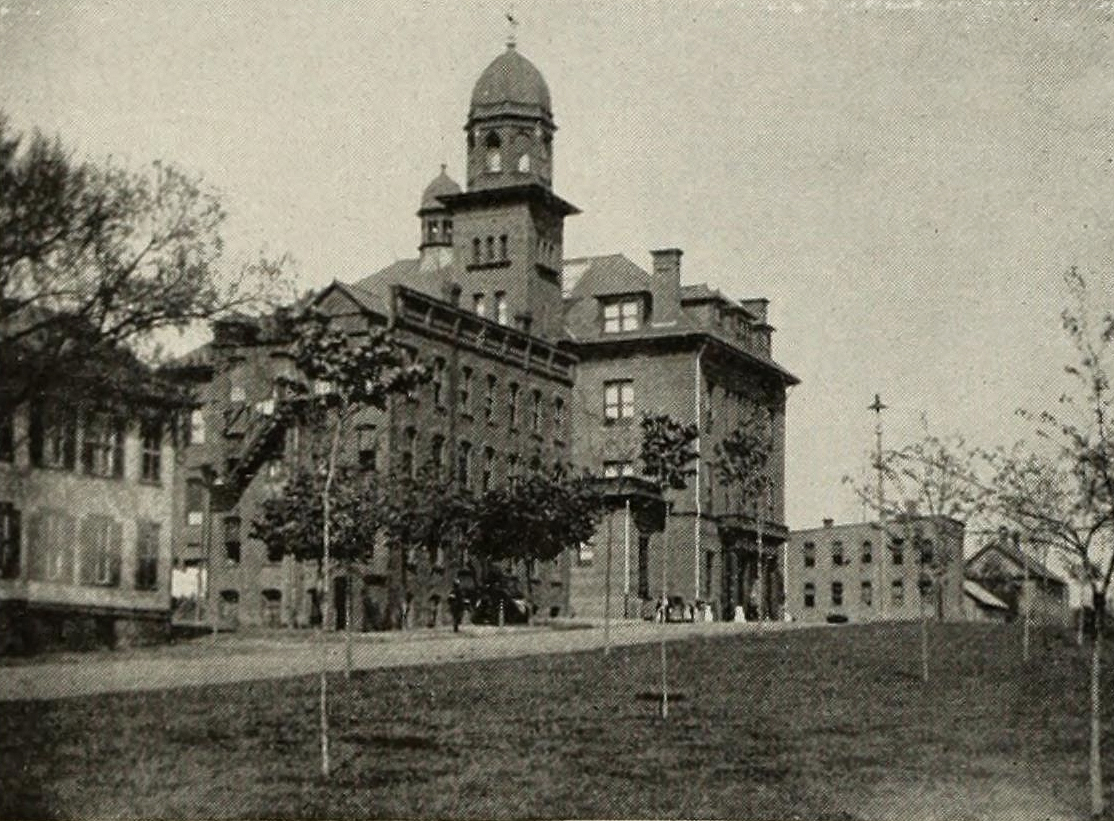
The original site of the Notre Dame du Perpetual Secours church, by known today in English as "Our Lady of Perpetual Help", adjacent to Pulaski Park

As Holyoke would reach its demographic peak of 62,300 residents by 1913, the Franco-American community grew with it. While Holyoke's French community was smaller than counterparts in the industrial cities of Fall River, Lowell, New Bedford, and Woonsocket, with the exception of New York City, it remained the largest French community west of Greater Boston, exceeding populations of French or French-Canadian born residents in New Orleans as well as Chicago at that time. Despite the early backlash to French-speaking immigrants, the community saw representation in the city's commercial and civic institutions less than two decades after the first arrived. The first member of the French-Canadian community to sit on the City Council's direct predecessor, the Board of Aldermen, was John J. Prew in 1885, the same member of the Proulx [sic] family who developed Springdale. However, the very first French-Canadian representatives in city government were Dr. M. M. Mitivier, publisher of the short-lived weekly Courrier d'Holyoke (lit. the Holyoke Mail), and Mr. A. G. Ridout, elected to the lower Common Council of 1877 during the city government's bicameral period. One of the most prominent representatives of the Franco community was Pierre Bonvouloir, who would serve as the city treasurer for nearly 40 years, from 1895 until his death 1932, and co-founded nearly all its financial institutions at that time, most prominently the City Co-operative Bank. In a 1922 speech, Governor Channing Cox, would honor Bonvouloir noting he was "held in universal esteem and love by the people of this city". After his death, his son Lionel Bonvouloir was elected to the position, serving in that capacity until 1944— when Lionel was found guilty of embezzlement of $25,000 from city funds. In general Francophones and Holyokers of French ancestry would become commonplace in Holyoke politics, with dozens serving in various capacities at all levels of municipal government throughout the 20th century.

A large number of Holyoke real estate was developed by two members of this community as well, namely Gilbert Potvin, and his pupil, Louis LaFrance. The latter would go on to become Holyoke's single largest taxpayer and construct some of the city's largest blocks, unabashedly christening them with his own name; indeed the Essex House, once the tallest structure in Holyoke, was first called the LaFrance Hotel. He would construct apartment blocks on a scale not seen before in the city, expanding the Downtown business district southward toward the Churchill area, and building some of the only brick apartments in the Highlands area, his last project before his death in 1938.

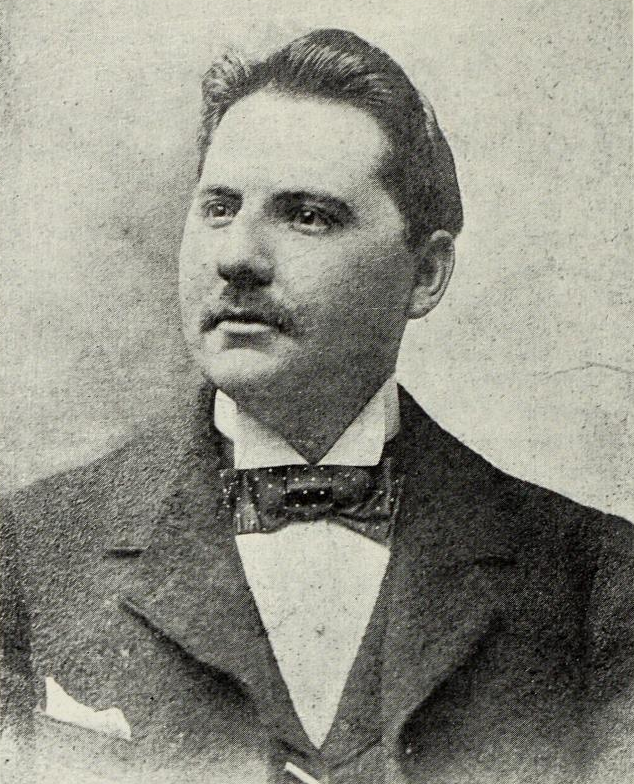
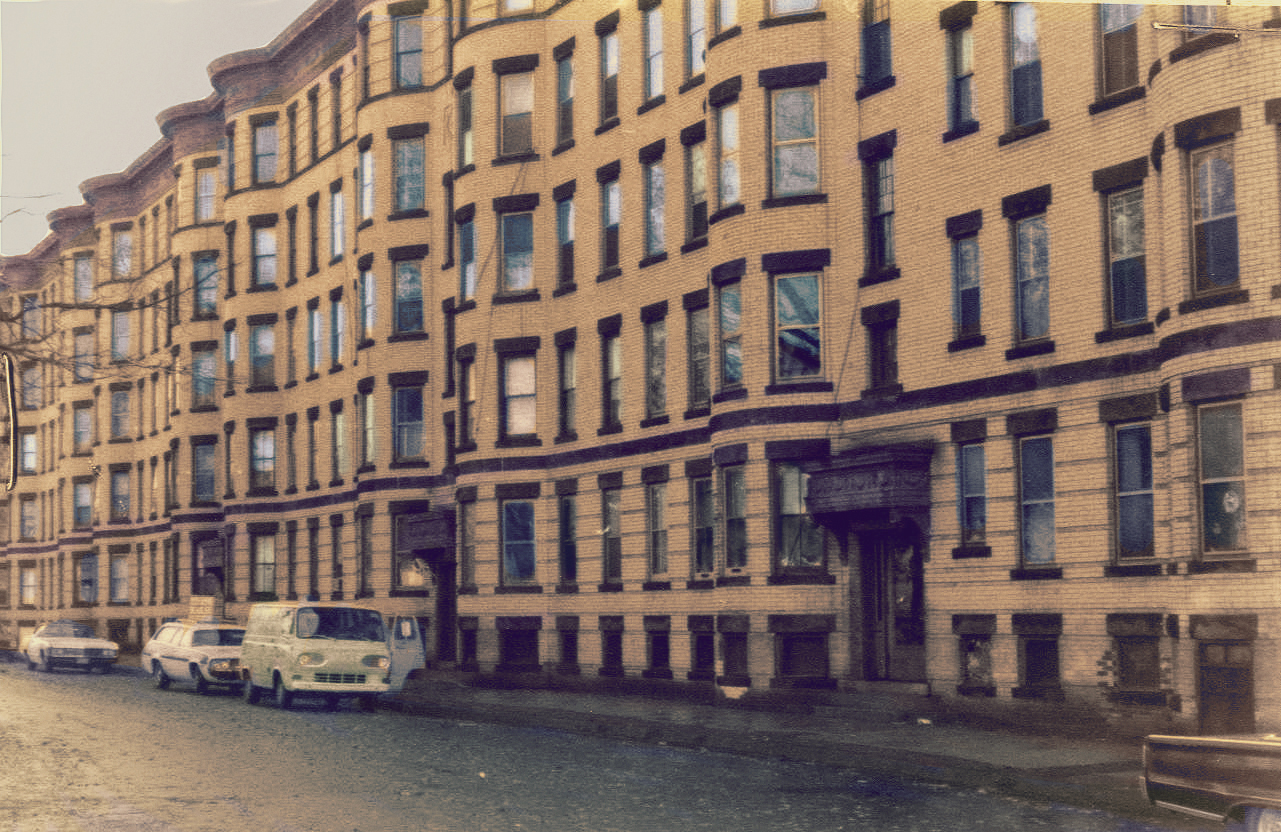
Louis Alphonse LaFrance, a developer who learned his trade as an apprentice in Holyoke under Gilbert Potvin, and whose commercial work during the city's peak years of industrial growth reshaped the landscape, with more than 126 blocks comprising 1,796 apartments; the "Battleship Block" apartments developed by LaFrance and designed by George P. B. Alderman

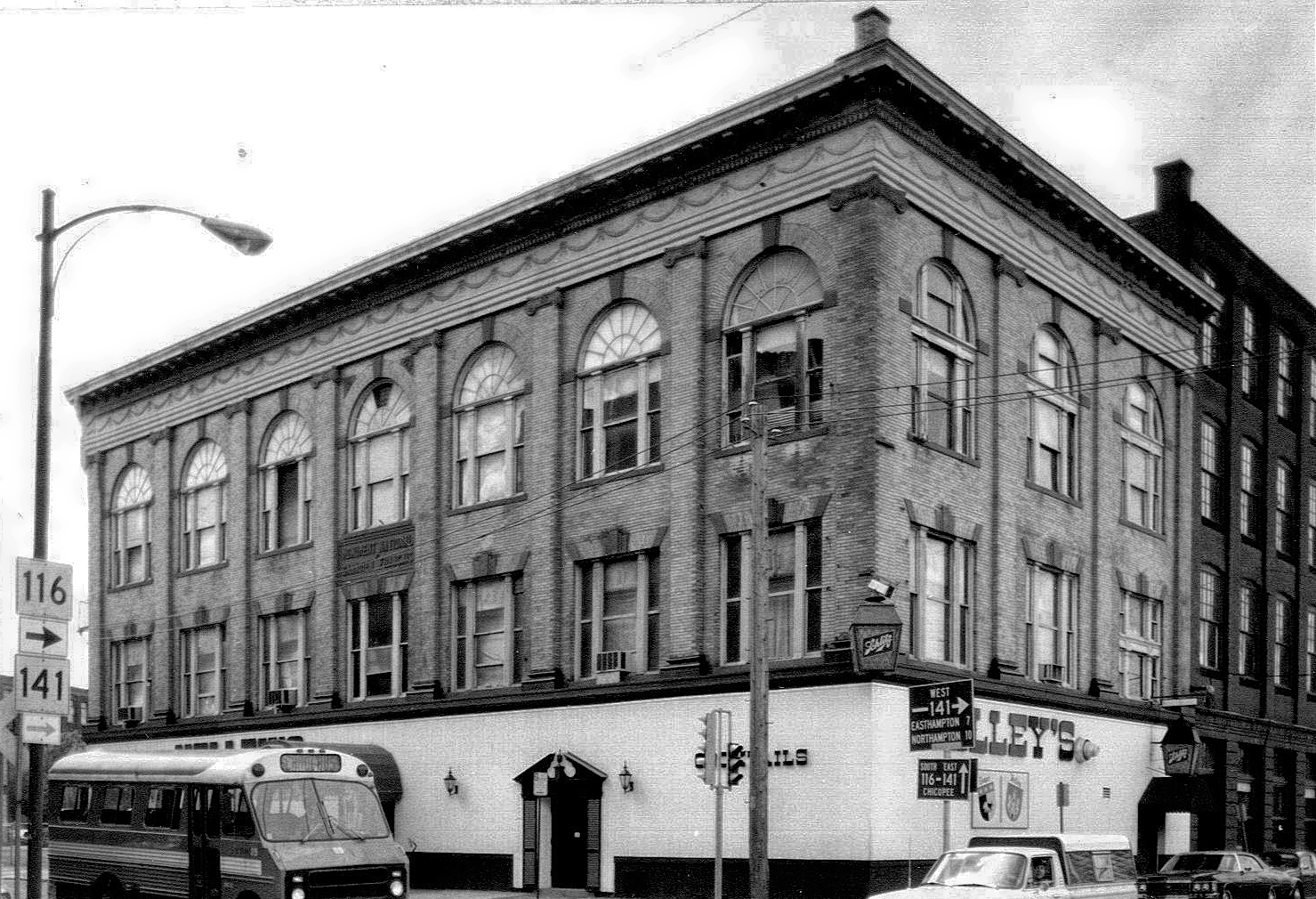
The Monument National Canadien Français, former banquet and memorial hall of the first council of the Saint-Jean-Baptiste Society of America, six months before it was destroyed by fire in 1984. Built 1904, after 1938 it was identified largely as Kelley's Lobster House and Banquet Hall

=== Contemporary history and culture ===
Holyoke would also see its first mayor of French ancestry in 1968 with the election of William Taupier; Taupier, a former councilman, held a tenure of controversy and success. Among his accomplishments was the "Golden Brick Campaign", which raised money for a new Holyoke Community College campus after its original location was razed by fire. From this campaign emerged what eventually became the Holyoke Community College Foundation, maintaining the school's private scholarships and endowment. Taupier also oversaw the city's centennial celebrations including a Franco-American committee among numerous other ethnic group committees which held cultural events. Conversely Taupier's administration was met with controversy when he oversaw the Holyoke Team Policing Program; the program came to an abrupt end when the mayor instituted a strict curfew on a predominantly Puerto Rican neighborhood following a disturbance. Charges of police brutality and eventual termination of the program by the city council would loom over Taupier's final year as mayor, and in 1975 he resigned to accept a city manager position in Lowell.

Emblem of Le Festival Franco-Américain, an educational-cultural organization which held its namesake event annually during the 1980s, with sponsorship from the French and Canadian governments

The only other mayor of Franco-American heritage, Ernest E. Proulx, was elected immediately after Taupier in 1976, in a time when Holyoke was characterized by an unprecedented increase in unemployment and civil unrest that made national coverage. Proulx would attribute his victory less to support from a Franco-American voting bloc, which comprised 1/3 of voters at the time, but rather his own stances on taxes and finance. In a 1982 interview he would describe the ethnic voting bloc as existing in numbers alone, and lamented that it lacked any common political identity by that time, going on to say that, in contrast with the city's active Polish and Irish communities, many had lost touch with their culture through generations of Americanization. As mayor, he would tout support from his predecessor as well as certain developments such as the creation of new manufacturing plants for Wang Laboratories and Dennison National, as well as the Le Festival Franco-Américain, an annual celebration in Holyoke and the Greater Springfield area, which honored him as a public servant of French-Canadian heritage. Proulx however proved to be a controversial figure in his handling of social issues such as desegregation and minority housing, delaying integration plans citing funding concerns, and setting up a Hispanic Affairs Commission only after years of resistance. He was described by one Valley Advocate writer as a deeply divisive political figure, "a man you either love or hate", after 12 years in office he was defeated by Martin J. Dunn in 1986.

Although other longstanding institutions like the Precious Blood Church would close before the decade was out, the 1980s were characterized by a brief revival in Franco-American culture. Local historian Vivian Potvin, who wrote the city's centennial French history was honored for her historical preservation work in 1986 with an award from the Conseil de la vie française en Amérique. Numerous other academic works would also be collected on the community's history, including a collection of oral histories recorded by Dr. Eloise Brière of the area's remaining New England French speakers in the early 1980s, and a number of works by Dr. Ernest Guillet and other researchers. One of the last large celebrations of Franco-American culture in the city occurred in the 1980s, when a number of local organizers including 27 French churches and the governments of Canada and France, sponsored Le Festival Franco-Américain a multi-day celebration of French music and cuisine. The first of these events was held in Holyoke in June 1983 as a multi-day event at the Holyoke Mall, featuring a temporary casino, as well as displays from its two international sponsors, and traditional French dress, music, concluding with a fireworks display. At least two other Le Festival events would be held thereafter in neighboring Chicopee, with the help of the City of New Orleans and its mayor Ernest Nathan Morial; the event would become one of the area's largest Mardi Gras celebrations before its parent organization eventually folded.

== Institutions ==
Emblem of the Union Saint-Jean-Baptiste d'Amerique; though based in Woonsocket, where its first national congress was held, the group's first meeting was originally organized and hosted by the Saint-Jean-Baptiste Society of Holyoke, whose leader, Edward Cadieux, would serve as the national body's first president

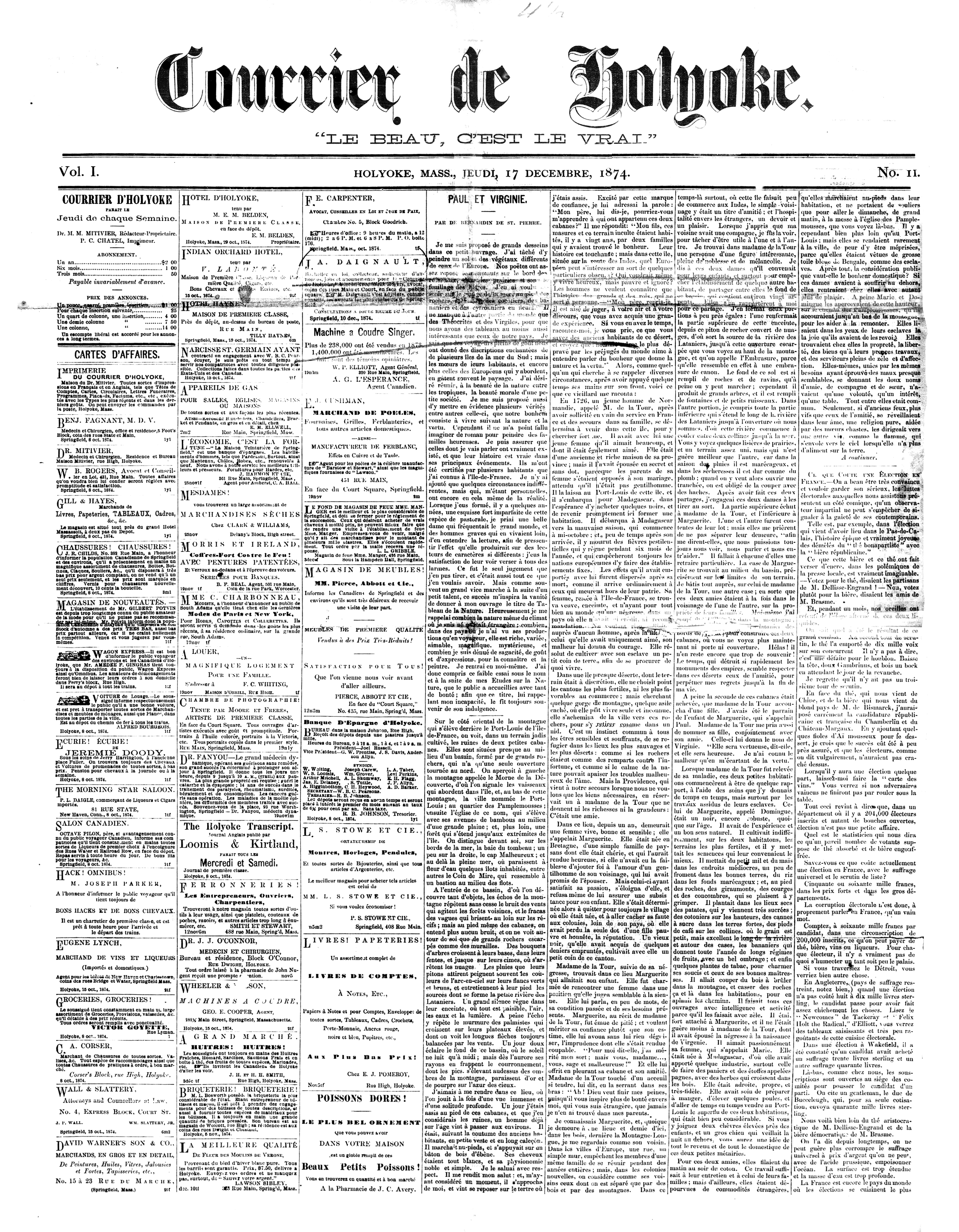
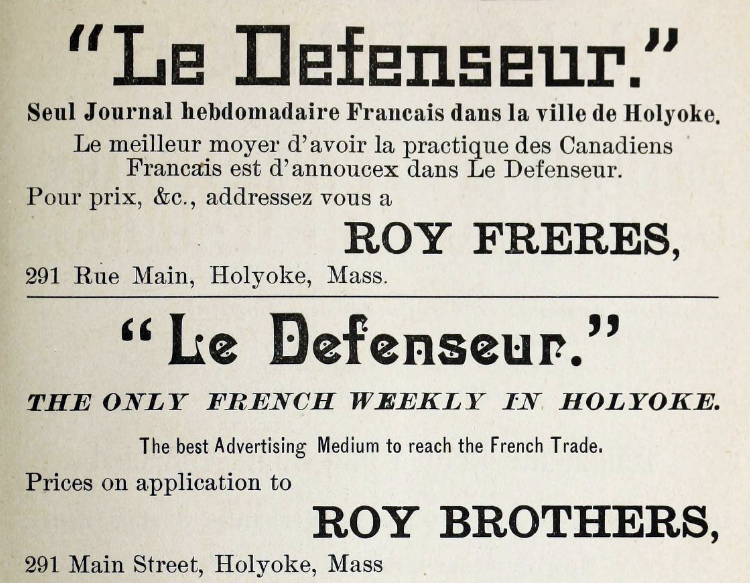
The weekly Courrier de Holyoke, the first French newspaper in Holyoke, published for 4 months beginning in 1874; an early bilingual advertisement for Le Defenseur, the first French newspaper to be published in the city for consecutive years, from 1884 to 1894

The earliest enduring cultural institutions of Holyoke's Franco-Americans were in large part the city's French Catholic Churches. The first of these being L'Église du Precieux Sang (the Precious Blood Church), which was established in 1869 and remained extant until its 1987 closure, and Notre Dame du Perpétuel Secours in 1890, which continued until the parish merged with Sacred Heart to form Our Lady of Guadalupe in 2005. The latter would eventually establish the Notre Dame du Perpetuel Secours Credit Union of Holyoke in 1911; though the credit union was originally created to help students understand thrift, it soon gained accounts of many other members of the community and has been known since 1918 as simply the Holyoke Credit Union.

Other financial businesses included the City Co-operative Bank, which was founded in 1889 and remained extant until it was purchased by United Bank in 1994. Featuring the motto "Faire Fructifier L'Epargne" ("Boost Savings"), the bank was founded to provided greater credit to working French. Longtime city treasurer Pierre Bonvouloir was not only instrumental in founding this bank, but also the aforementioned credit union, as well as the Home National Bank, Holyoke Savings Bank, and the PeoplesBank, all of which he had served as a member of the board of directors.

In 1912 the Alliance Française de Holyoke was established, with Louis LaFrance's wife being president of the branch, however the organization, which teaches the French language and provides cultural exchange, had only 15 members in 1922 and appears to have folded at some time in the 20th century. Today the closest chapter is that of Hartford and the French Cultural Center in Boston.

=== Union Saint-Jean-Baptiste d'Amérique ===
The first organization in the city specifically dedicated to French culture was the Société Saint-Jean-Baptiste d'Holyoke, which was organized in 1872. By 1899 the society reached out to several other so-named organizations to form a national union to represent the interests of French-American immigrants and provide benefits to its membership. This effort culminated in a meeting of Holyoke's and several other would-be chapters from New England on February 26, 1899, and by May 7, 1900 the Union Saint-Jean-Baptiste d’Amerique had been established in Woonsocket, with Holyoke's president, Edward Cadieux, serving as the first leader of the national organization. By the 1920s the Saint-Jean-Baptiste Society of Holyoke had become a social fixture for Franco-Americans in Western Massachusetts, holding a "grand fête jubilee" in 1922 to honor its 50th anniversary, which hosted more than a dozen other Massachusetts chapters as well as Massachusetts Governor Channing Cox, and serving as the location of the national organization's 11th congress during its 25th anniversary in 1925. By that time the organization was described by The Boston Globe as the largest French Catholic fraternal society in the United States. Many other cultural, service organizations and benefit societies would be established in the Holyoke French community, including L'Union Canadienne, and a chapter of Richelieu International.

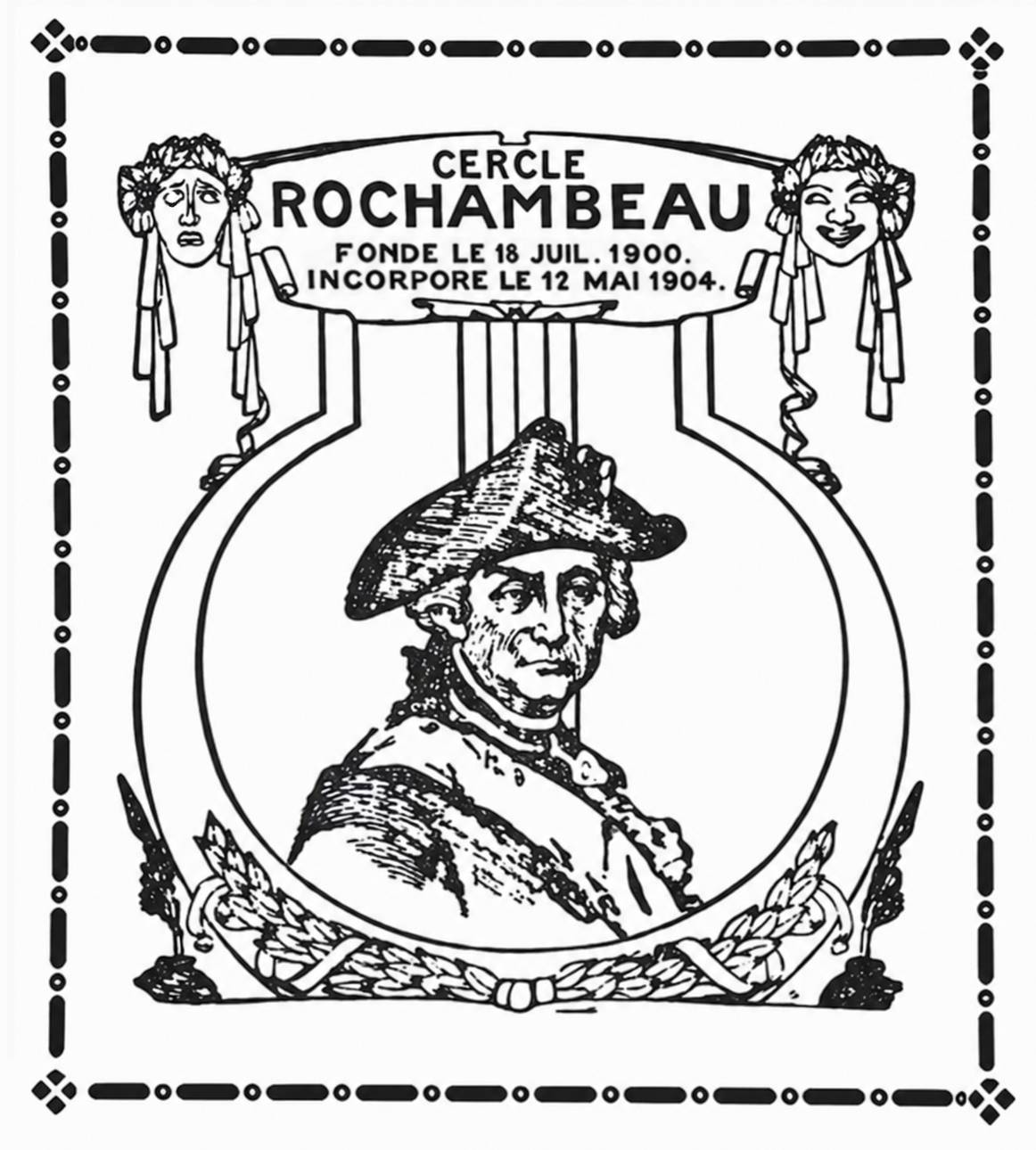
Emblem of one of the city's most prominent French performance troupes in the 20th century, Le Cercle Rochambeau

=== Dramatic societies ===
During the early days of the city's history, theaters abounded in Holyoke, one of the most prominent being the Holyoke Opera House, and its most famous citizen of the day, considered the first pop icon or "rockstar" of the modern age, Eva Tanguay, was one of several French performers who got found the makings of acting careers in the city. In these days the city was also home to a number of dramatic societies or drama clubs, many of which were a cornerstone of the Franco community. Prior to the advent of television and the radio, at least 19 "Cercles Dramatiques were extant in Holyoke for varying durations during the years of 1900 and 1940. Among these were several tied with church parishes, as well as trade unions such as Les Artisans Canadiens Français de Holyoke, literary societies like Le Cercle Littéraire Français, comedy clubs like Le Cercle de Comédie Français de Holyoke, and benefit societies such as Le Cercle Rochambeau, the latter of which would endure well into the 1970s.

=== Newspapers and publishers ===
French-Language Newspapers of Holyoke
Courrier de Holyoke (1874)
Le Défenseur (1884–1894)
Le Progres (c. 1885)
L'Annexioniste (c. 1885)
Le Ralliement (c. 1886–1888)
La Presse (c. 1895–1903)
La Justice (1904–1964)
La Revue (c. 1907)

As previously mentioned, the Precious Blood church would become known infamously worldwide for the fire which destroyed its original meetinghouse during the eponymous Precious Blood Church fire of May 27, 1875. The day after the fire, the Holyoke Transcript would publish its first and only edition in French. The paper was however not the first Holyoke serial to publish in French. In 1874, Dr. M. M. Mitivier, who was also among the first French to sit on the city council, began publishing the Courrier de Holyoke. The first regular French newspaper in Holyoke, the paper's existence was brief, ceasing publication after 4 months. Another short-lived paper, Le Ralliement, was established by Gabriel Marchand, son of Quebec Premier Félix-Gabriel Marchand, in 1886, publishing weekly until about 1888.

While a number of other short-lived periodicals would appear in French, an era of continuous journalism in the French language began when in 1884 the Roy Freres (lit. the Roy Brothers) began publishing Le Défenseur. The paper, a weekly, would publish local, national, and international news in French and advertised to English speakers as a means to readily reach this demographic as well. The paper was one of the first successful French publications in the city, and would publish for a decade before folding in 1894. The gap left in its absence would be filled the following year by the semiweekly La Presse, by publishers Tesson & Carignan. The paper would serve as the press's flagship as the Holyoke firm would go on to publish 4 other newspapers by the year 1900 in Fitchburg, as well as others in New Hampshire and Connecticut. The success of the firm was short-lived however, and by 1903 La Presse had ceased publication.

Around the time that La Presse ceased publication, Holyoke's longest-running and most widely circulated non-English paper was published. La Justice, a regular weekly paper, was initially established in 1904, however as a printing firm the LaJustice Publishing Company may have begun as early as 1900. First printing in 1903, the paper was established by medical doctor H. E. Chaput, however the figure chiefly identified with the paper was Joseph Lussier, who purchased it in 1908 and served as its editor and publisher until 1940. During Lussier's tenure, the paper would expand its circulation to around 4,500 by 1922, and publish not only news but fiction as well, most notably Emma Dumas' Mirbah; a serial novel about a French Canadian actress in Holyoke. In 1940 Lussier would sell the paper to novelist Jacques Ducharme who, realizing he had decidedly no interest in running a newspaper, sold it to the firm's printer Roméo-Dadace Raymond, who passed it to his son Gerry Ramond. It ceased publication in 1964, following the death of Raymond Sr. Although the printing firm LaJustice would continue for several decades thereafter, this marked the end of a period of 80 years (1884–1964) which was characterized by regular French-language publishing in Holyoke.

=== Alsatians and Lorrainians ===
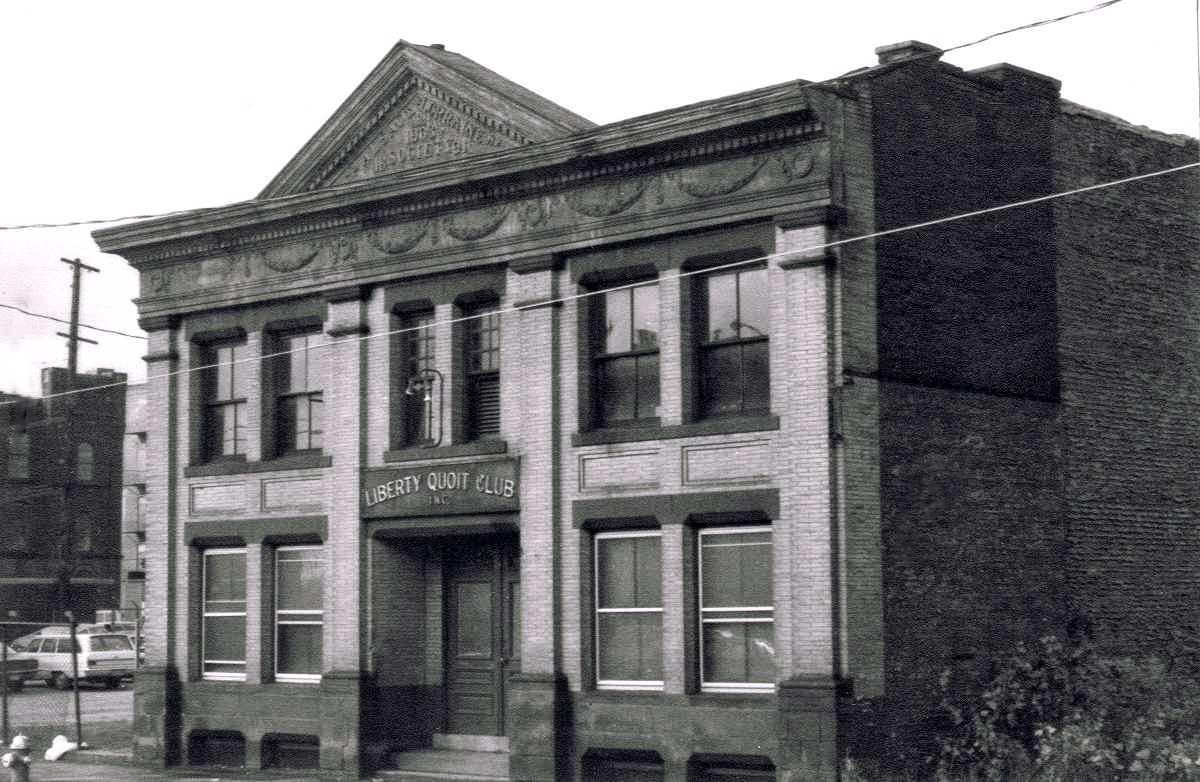
The former lodge of the Alsace-Lorraine Union of America as it appeared in 1978

Although Holyoke's French history is identified with a Québécois diaspora, throughout the city's history it has had a considerable number of individuals identified as French but not as French Canadian. Among these was a sizable population of Germanic peoples as well from the border regions with Germany, namely a number of Alsatians (fr) and Lorrainians (also called "Lotharingians") from the contested territory of Alsace-Lorraine which remained a point of contention between the French and the German Empire, and later Nazi Germany, from the Franco-Prussian War in 1870 until the end of World War II. Today the territory is identified with the French region Grand Est.

While their exact numbers remain unknown, many Holyoke residents were from families who emigrated from Alsace-Lorraine, including one of the city's best-known builders Casper Ranger, whose family arrived in the 1850s. The group, of which many spoke the French language, however did not always see agreement with their French-Canadian counterparts, one of the few records of their interactions being a fight that occurred during the Alsatians' celebration of a Prussian victory during the Franco-Prussian War. By the turn of the nineteenth century the community had grown considerably and by 1891 the Alsace-Lorraine Society was formed, formally incorporating six years later on March 26, 1897 as the "Alsace-Lorraine Union of America". The Union was an apolitical benefit society, providing sick and death benefits to its membership as well as hosting cultural events.

The club began in 1891, hosting a "masquerade and fancy dress ball" to raise money for their sick/death fund, this event would continue annually for at least two decades. In 1903 the group would move to its own clubhouse, designed by George P. B. Alderman, located at the acute corner of what is now Carlos Vega Park on modern day Clemente Street (then known as "Park Street"). The opening of their new hall would be marked by a concert given by the Holyoke Turner Hall and Springdale Turner singers, indicating the Germanic culture of the club. The membership of the board however would be identified with names from the region both German and French in origin, such as Boistelle, Jacquel, Hegy, and Mittler. By the time the Union had reached its 25th anniversary in 1916, it comprised 150 members. It remains unknown what language their business meetings were conducted in, given the interlingual Germanic-Franco nature of the Alsatian dialect. Following a period of decline, by 1936 the club building was relinquished to a local bank, and by the 1970s the former clubhouse was home to a quoits club before being demolished in the 1980s.

== International relations ==
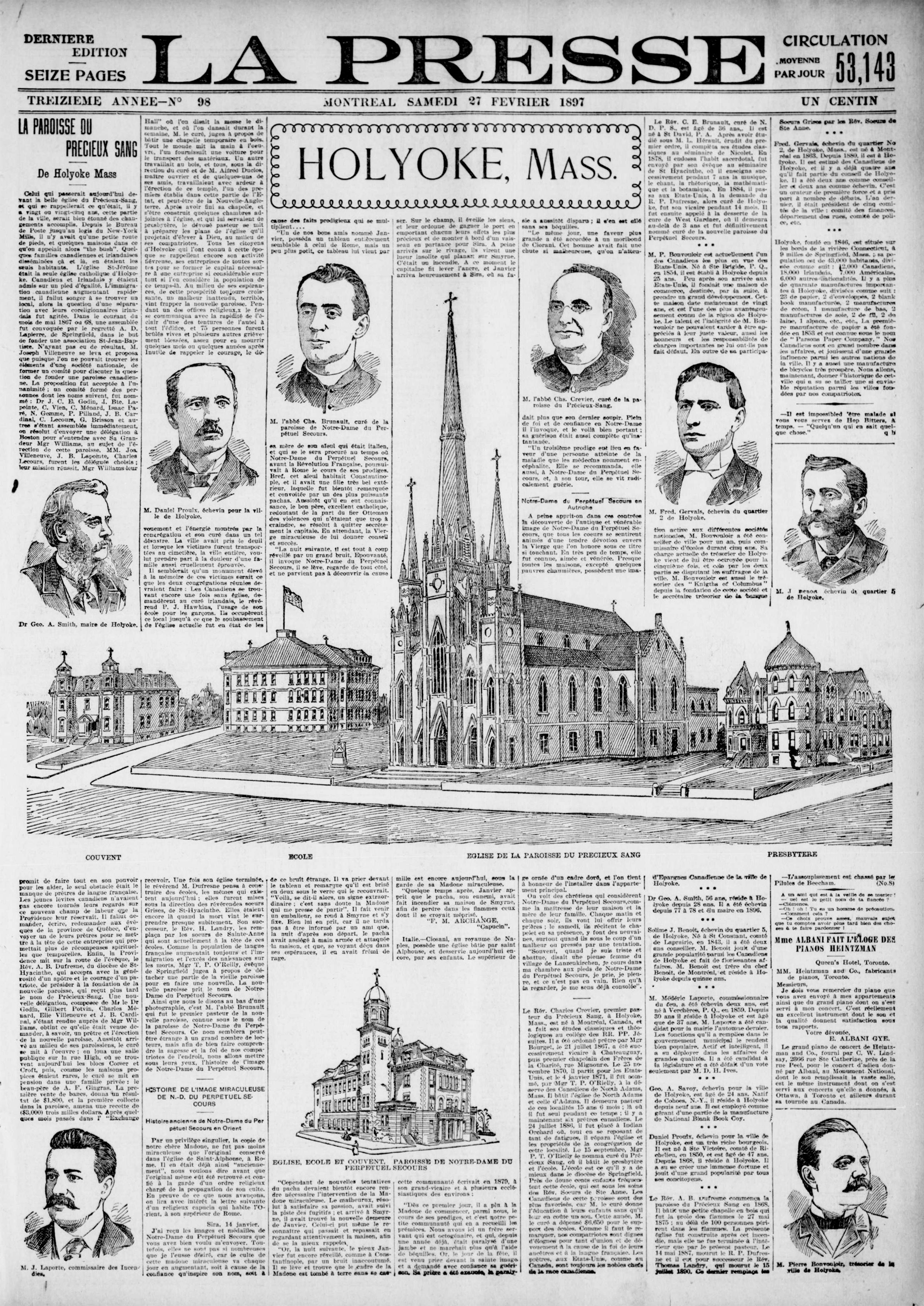
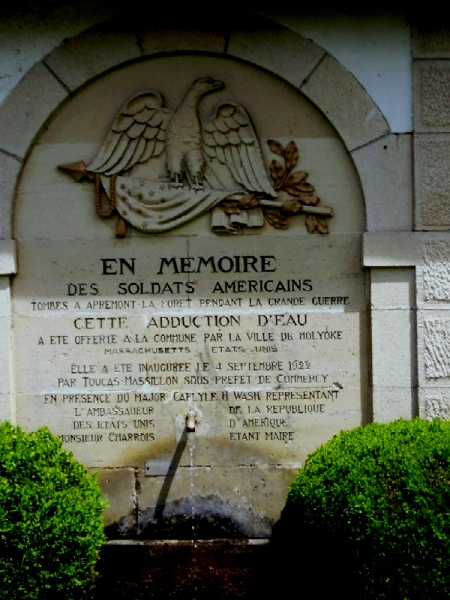
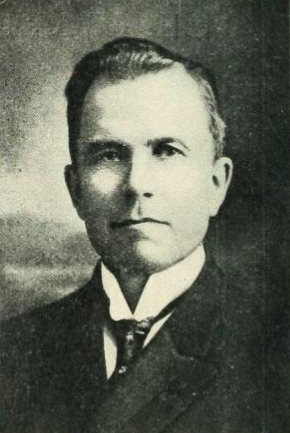
Left to right: The front page of the Montreal newspaper La Presse, featuring several figures in Holyoke's Québécois community and the new Precious Blood Church; the memorial in Apremont-la-Forêt, France, for the 104th Division soldiers who liberated that village, and the Holyoke's gift of a new water supply; and Joseph Lussier editor and publisher of the weekly La Justice, who was honored by the French Republic with the Palmes académiques for his dedication to the French language and culture

=== Canada ===
While living in Holyoke, many residents remained abreast with current events in Canada and Quebec specifically; indeed the city's French newspapers would dedicate regular columns to the affairs of the province. On at least three occasions, residents sent formal petitions to the National Assembly of Quebec and the Canadian parliament. The first was a petition to the Quebec Assembly concerning several residents who wished to return to the province, filing the petition due to some concern regarding naturalization status. During the North-West Rebellion, two petitions were sent to the Governor General of Canada's office. One contained 300 signatures of Holyoke French-Canadians calling for the pardon of Ambroise Lépine for his crimes of treason in the death of Thomas Scott; ultimately the outcry in Canada and abroad led to his death sentence being commuted. Similarly, in 1886, a petition of 602 signatures of French residents was sent to the Governor General, calling for the pardon of Louis Riel, who had infamously led the rebellion of Métis peoples and was ultimately hung for treason.

In the literary world the city also hosted a banquet honoring French Canadian poet laureate Louis Fréchette (fr). A recipient of the Académie française's Prix Montyon, he was the first Canadian author to receive such an honor from a European nation. A group of the city's French-Canadian residents would organize a banquet welcoming him to the United States, held at former-Mayor Whiting's Windsor Hotel on January 31, 1882. Fréchette was received at this banquet by several city and state officials, including former Holyoke mayors William B. C. Pearsons and William Whiting, as well as the Massachusetts Governor Long and president of the State Senate, Robert R. Bishop. He would be accompanied to the States by MP Lucius Seth Huntington, and one H. C. St. Pierre who was reported to be a Queen's Counsel. Throughout the evening many toasts were made by these officials including one by Fréchette praising the welcoming message that had been delivered to him from President Garfield.

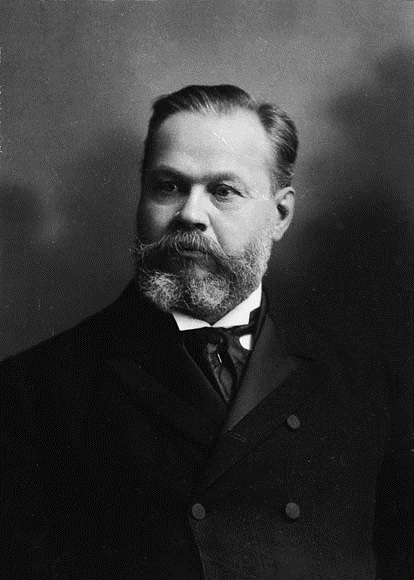
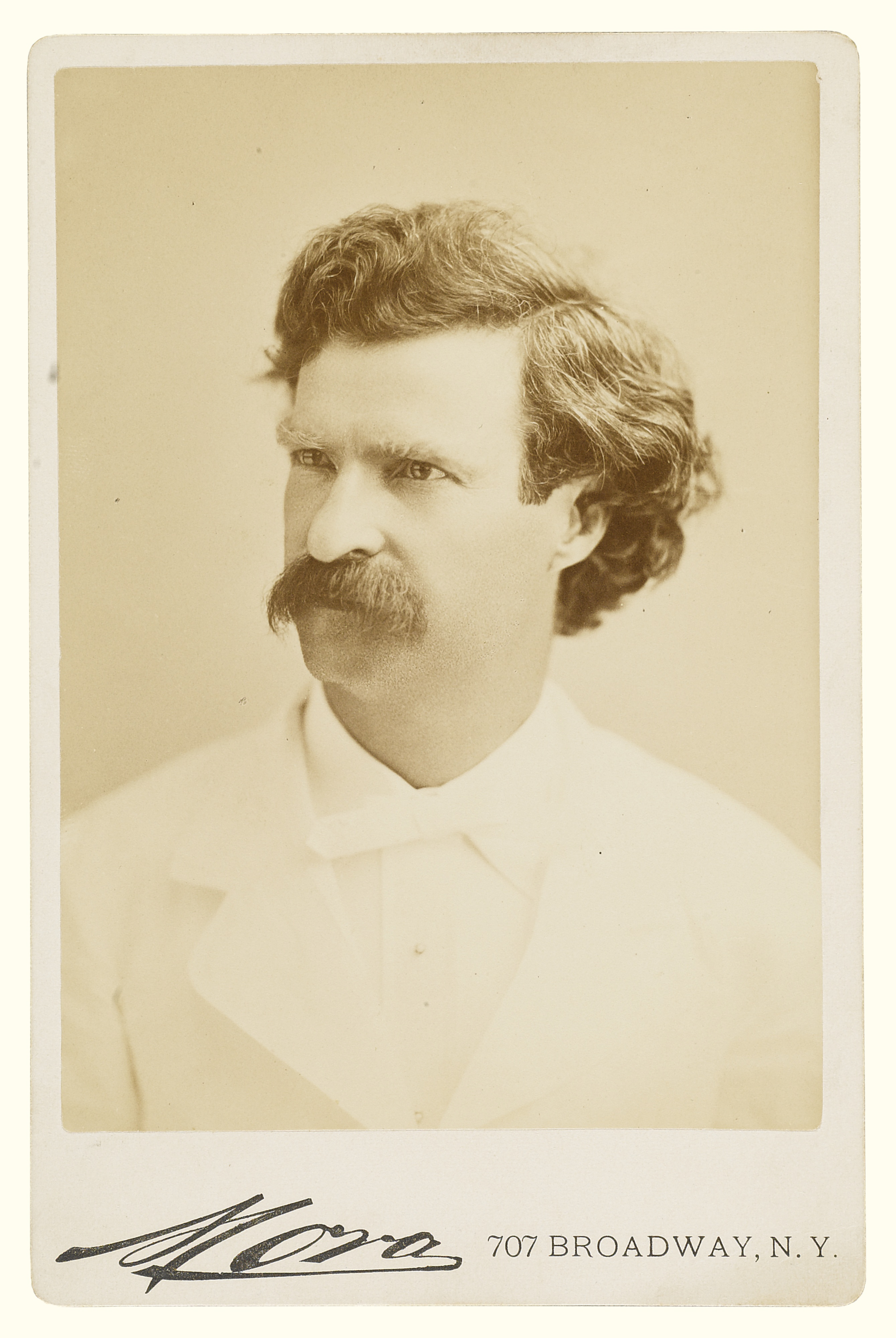
French-Canadian poet laureate Louis Fréchette, who was received in Holyoke at a banquet welcoming him to the United States by a number of the city's Québecois residents, city and state officials, and most notably American author Mark Twain

Among these speeches was one given by a man most admired by the Quebec author, the eminent American writer Mark Twain, who had previously met Fréchette on his trip to Montreal in the previous year when he arrived in Canada to copyright his novel The Prince and the Pauper. Indeed in his toast Twain would make a sort of mockery of translation as a means of acclaim, and guests of the banquet each received a hotel menu card with a poem by Fréchette for the occasion "Toast à Mark Twain"; the two would remain respected contemporaries, exchanging letters and books thereafter. Fréchette would give a reading of his poems the following day on the steps of City Hall before a gathering of 250 residents; in contrast he would return to Holyoke in 1888, with another delegation of Canadian officials to be greeted by a crowd of 10,000. This time the reception was held in a City Hall ballroom draped in banners of Canada, Quebec, and the French colors, and would be accompanied by Honoré Beaugrand, a politician and folklorist best remembered for writing the most common account of the Canadian folktale of the La Chasse-galerie, also known as "The Bewitched Canoe" or "The Flying Canoe".

=== France ===
At least two residents of Holyoke were decorated with honors from the French Republic for efforts related to the city. Chief among them was philanthropist and businesswoman Belle Skinner for her rallying of Holyoke and other American cities to "adopt" French villages for reconstruction after the First World War. While not French herself, in her travels after the First World War Ms. Skinner became enamored with the cause of post-war reconstruction, and for her efforts in rallying a national movement of adopting villages, and the reconstruction of the Chateau Hattonchatel and its surrounding village. In Paris at some time during the month of January 1919, she was awarded the Médaille de la Reconnaissance française by Premier Alexandre Millerand and made the rank of Chevalier in the Légion d'honneur.

At her urgence the City of Holyoke itself, briefly maintained a sister city relationship with the French village Apremont-la-Forêt, which had been liberated by the 104th Infantry, the first American military unit honored by a foreign country for bravery in combat. In the aftermath of World War I the village was "adopted", and the workers sent by the city provided it with a new water system, public bath, and community center. In return for this help the village would rename its town square "Place d'Holyoke" and its main road "Rue Belle Skinner", and in 1930 the Holyoke city government would rededicate a military service road in Rock Valley as the Apremont Highway to commemorate the goodwill between the village and the city.

The French government would bestow a second honor on an eminent city figure when on January 14, 1934, before a crowd of 1,000 at the Valley Arena, Joseph Lussier, longtime editor of La Justice was honored with a Palmes Académiques award, in honor of his work supporting Francophone culture, by the supreme secretary of the Saint-Jean-Baptiste Society, on behalf of the French Consul General of New York Charles de Ferry de Fontnouvelle.

== Legacy ==
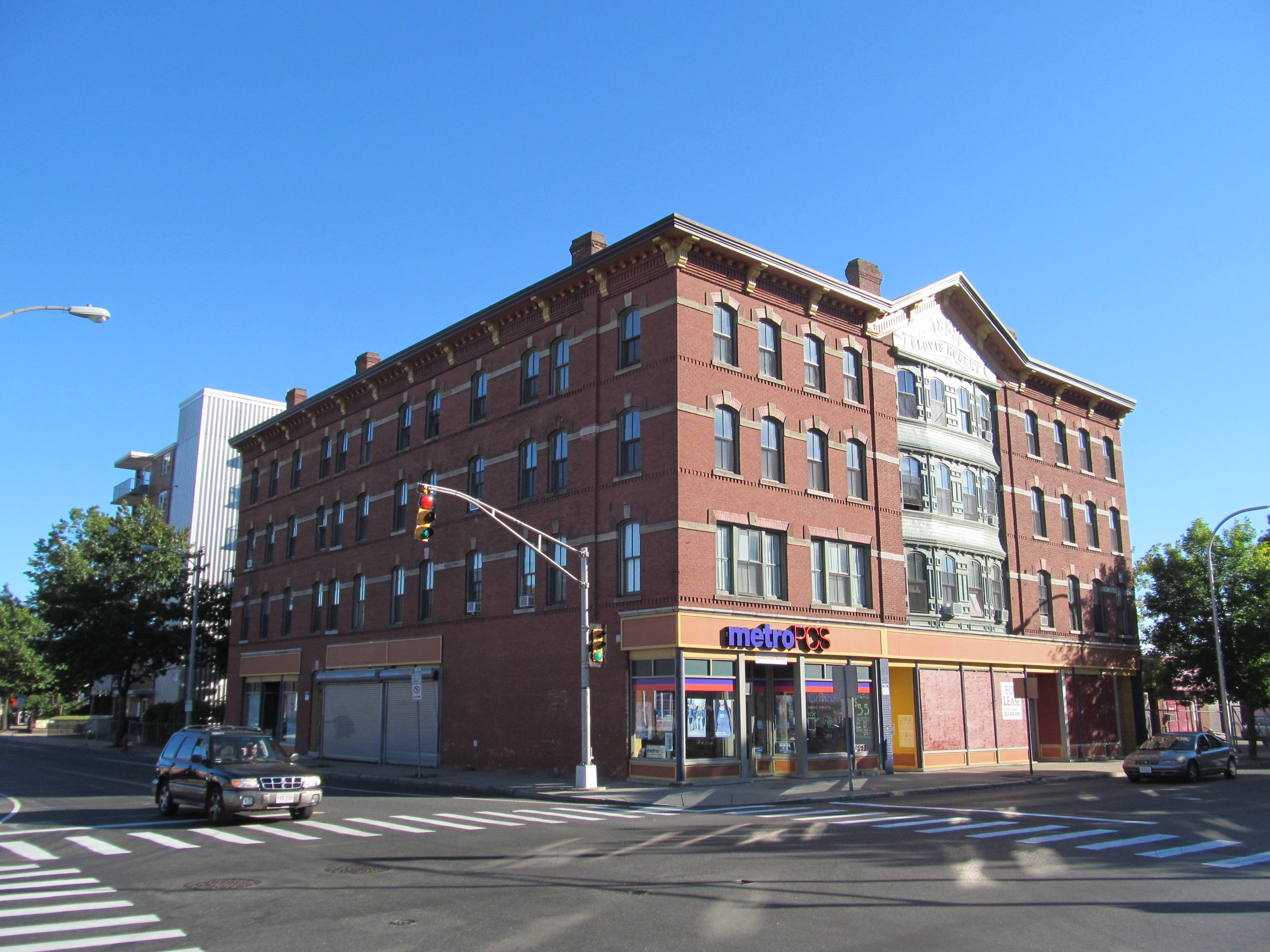
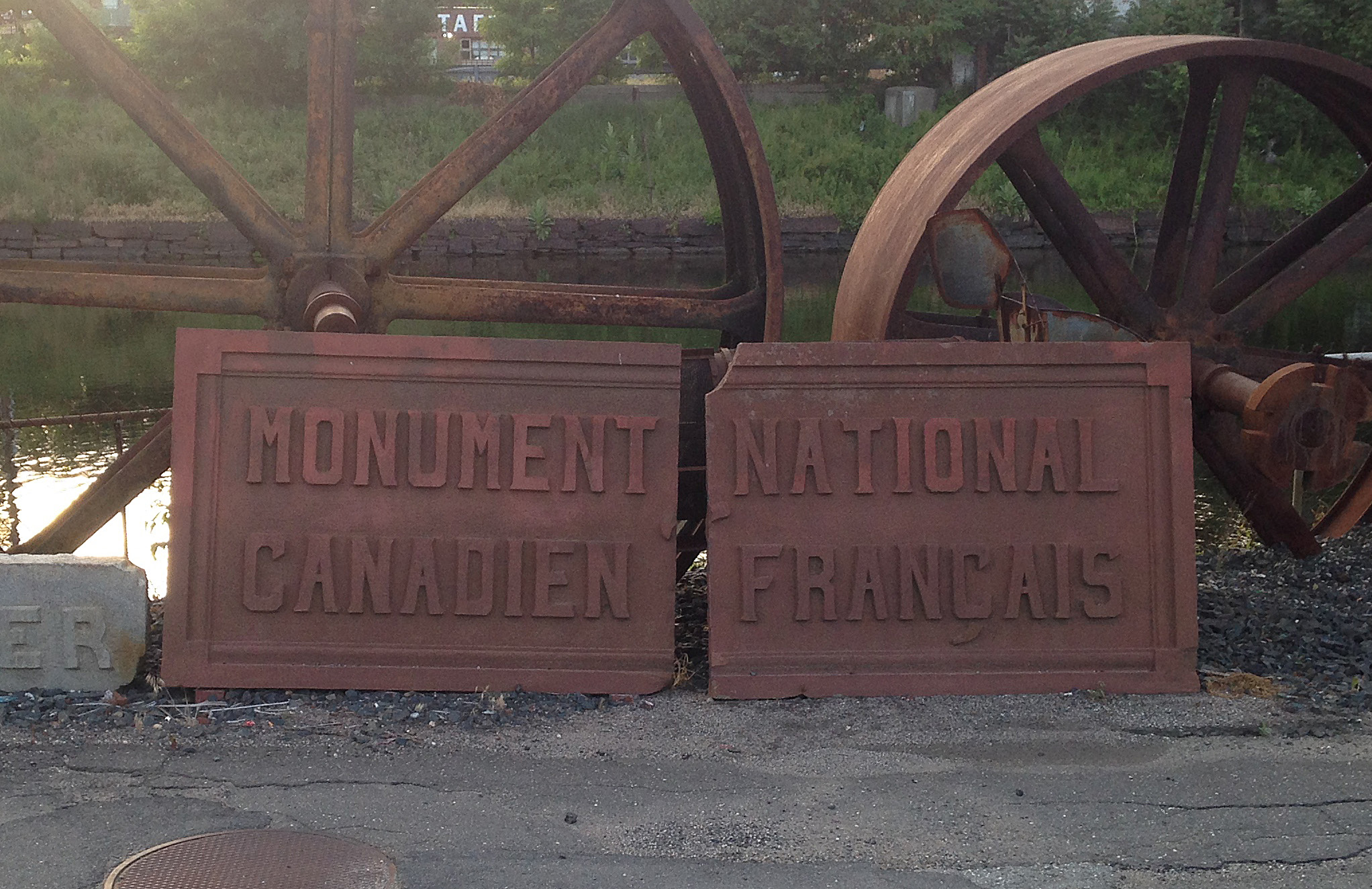
The Clovis Robert Block, named for an early Québecois resident who served as a real estate agent for the Holyoke and Westfield Railroad; nameplate of the former Monument National Canadien Français

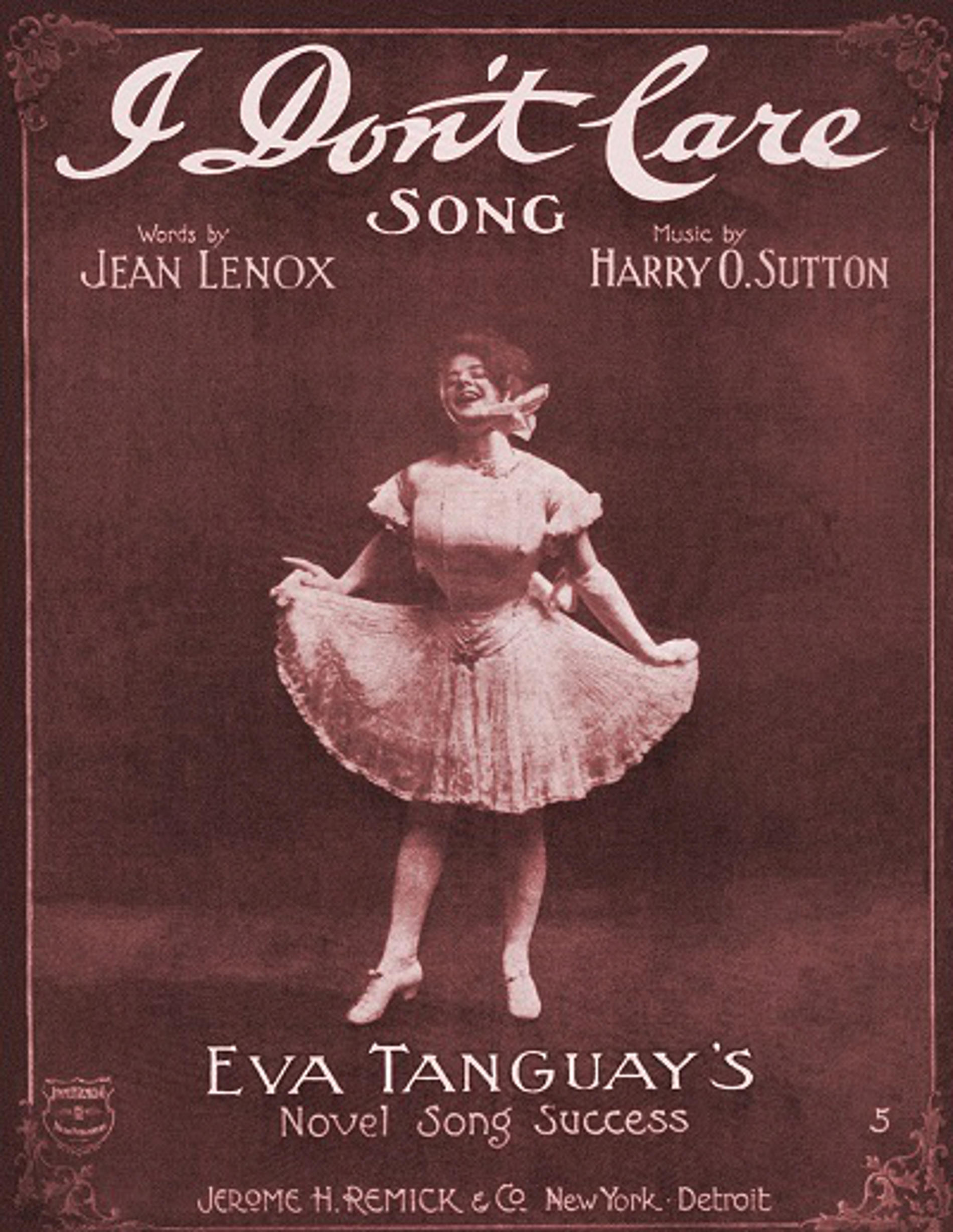
Sheet music for Eva Tanguay's best known performance piece, I Don't Care; Tanguay, who got her start as an amateur singer and dancer in Holyoke, would become the first American popular musician to achieve mass-media celebrity

While only decades prior Jacques Ducharme received criticism for his use of English in his books, following the decline of the French press, by the latter half of the 20th century many in the community became Americanized, choosing to primarily conduct business in English. The New England French once spoken in the city is no longer extant in public life, with slightly more than 0.5% of all residents speaking any form of the language by 2015. A substantial collection of interviews recorded by Eloise Brière exists however in the UMass Amherst Library Special Collections, and contains conversations with prominent families of the area, almost entirely in the region's French dialect, with the exception of an interview in English with Mayor Ernest Proulx.

Among smaller remnants of the city's French is "The Franco" bar in The Flats, which retains its name as the former meetinghouse of the Franco-American Club. French names adorn several streets in Holyoke today, including the Apremont Highway, and two public housing projects operated by the Holyoke Housing Authority, Beaudoin Village, and the Beaudry-Boucher Tower. A number of buildings designed by French-Canadian architect Oscar Beauchemin still define the skylines of historic commercial districts in city's neighborhoods, as well as blocks developed by Louis LaFrance, and Casper Ranger, the latter of whom built many of Mount Holyoke College's ornate campus buildings. Although the Precious Blood Church was demolished, its rectory now hosts a food pantry, as well as a rehabilitation program for substance abuse. The downtown's tallest commercial building, sometimes erroneously known as the Prudential Building, is named the Prew Building, as John J. Prew (Proulx) purchased it from J.R. Smith soon upon its completion.

Of the many Franco-American institutions that once existed, a handful remain. Among the few extant French groups in Holyoke is the Beavers Club of Western Massachusetts, a charity founded in 1945 by a group of French-Canadian Holyoke tradesmen who found themselves unable to join the area's other service organizations. The group, comprising men of at least a quarter French ancestry, primarily contributes free construction labor as well as meals to local charities.

While no local French news and publishing outlets remain extant as of 2026, during evening hours French radio shows can still be received from Canadian Class A AM radio stations CJBC 860 AM, an Ici Radio-Canada Première affiliate, and CKAC, Radio Circulation 730. Cultural events and programming are also provided at times by Mount Holyoke College's French Department in South Hadley. Holyoke Community College also maintains a French Program in its "Language and Latinx Studies" department, in tandem with its Spanish coursework as a global business language, and holds a French Film Festival free and open to the public annually, typically in March and April.

=== Literature ===
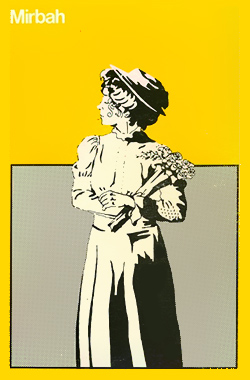
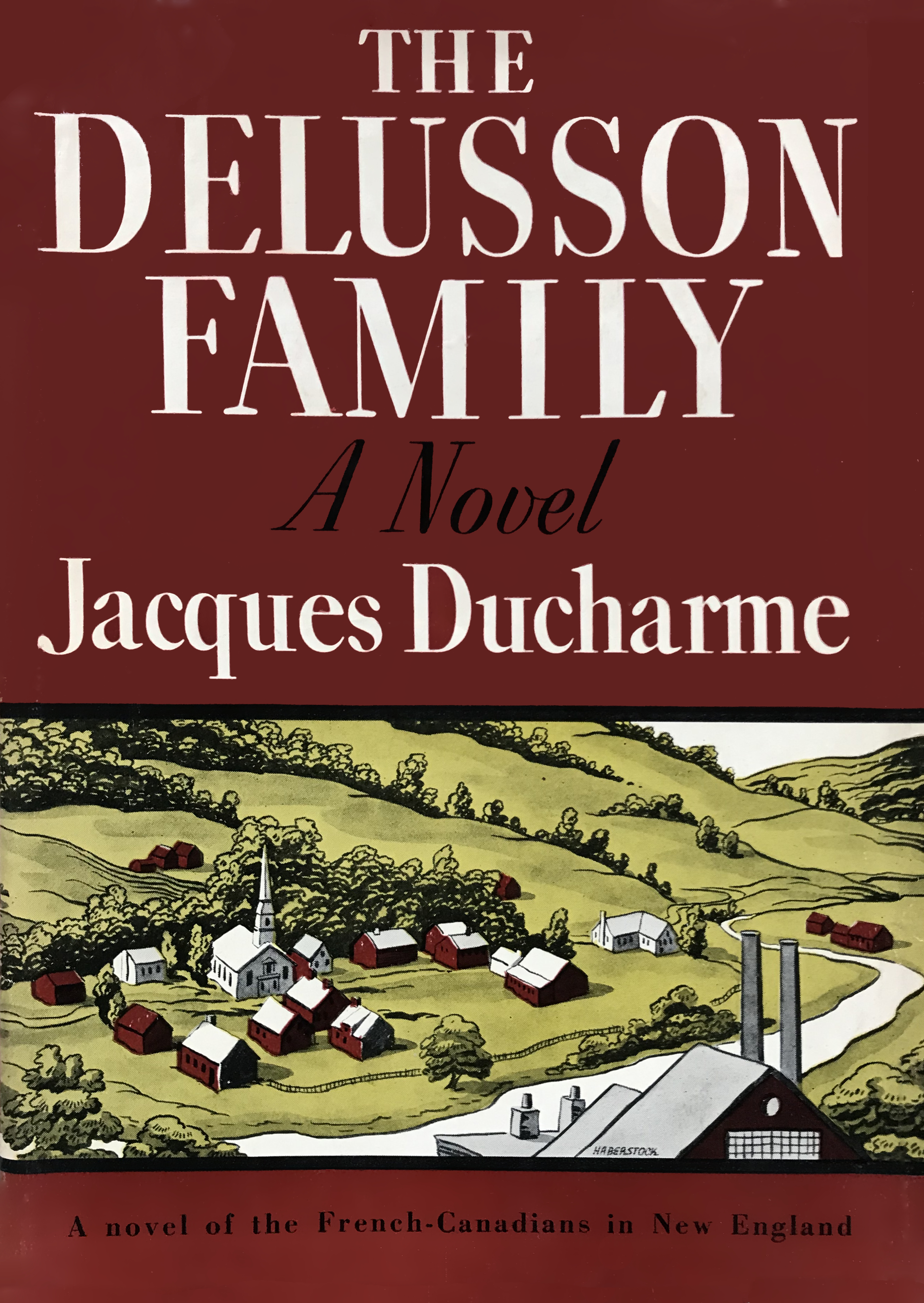
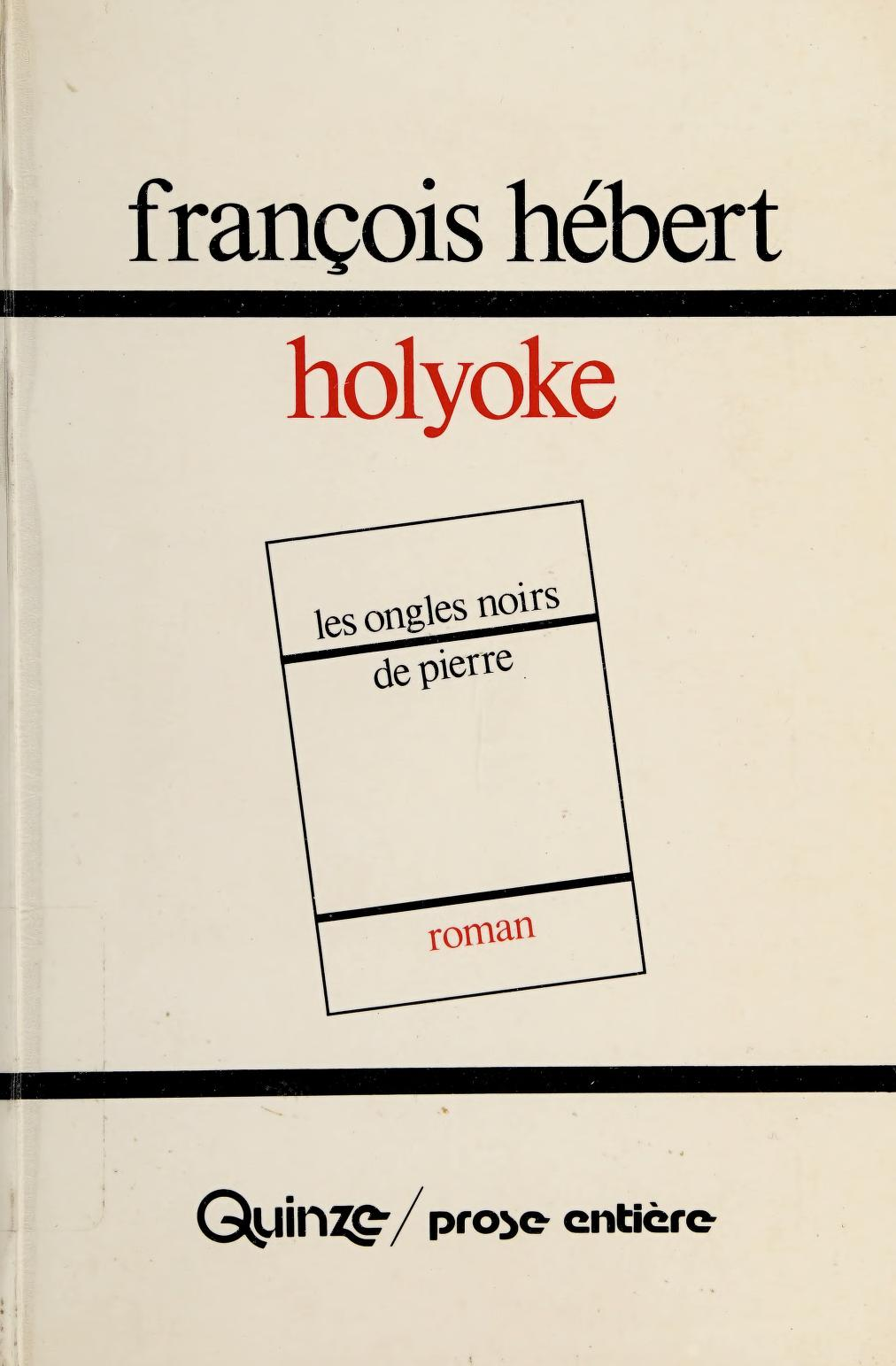
Cover of 1979 edition of Mirbah, published by the National Materials Development Center for French; first edition of The Delusson Family by Jacques Ducharme; cover of Holyoke by François Hébert

In addition to the numerous editions of La Justice and a handful of other short-lived papers, Jacques Ducharme also covered the history of the French community in his English-language book The Shadows of the Trees, as well as in the novel The Delusson Family, which gives a fictional portrayal of a mill worker and his family arriving to the city and struggling to support themselves in the 19th century. Ducharme would later confirm in a 1976 interview with researcher Ernest Guillet that "each character [in the novel] represents a real person; situations and places have undergone very minor changes." Another noted literary work was the French-language serial novel Mirbah written by Emma Dumas under the nom de plume "Emma Port-Joli". In the academic journal Quebec Studies, researcher Cynthia Lees would describe the work as unrefined in its plot and characters, but relevant to historical research insofar as "Dumas is not unlike certain American novelists such as Harriet Beecher Stowe or Charles Brockden Brown whom Jane Tompkins describes as having 'designs upon their audiences, in the sense of wanting to make people think and act in a particular way'". Indeed the novel following the life of a fictitious French actress in the city would describe social hierarchies among the community of the late 19th century. In 1978, Québecois writer François Hébert would write his novel Holyoke, a work described by a University of Laval literature compendium as comprising "a mirrored structure on the lost sorrow of the (love) quest of the other and the loneliness". Simultaneously the novel explores the social dynamic of Québec and its expatriates in the United States and references the city's culture and paper industry that drew so many French-Canadians there.

== See also ==
- St. Joseph's Church (Springfield, Massachusetts), the first church in Springfield built to serve that city's French and French Canadian populations
- Tourtière, popular dish among Quebec immigrants, served at réveillon
