= La Justice =

US newspaper in the French language

- Age Quod Agis (Latin) "Come as you are"

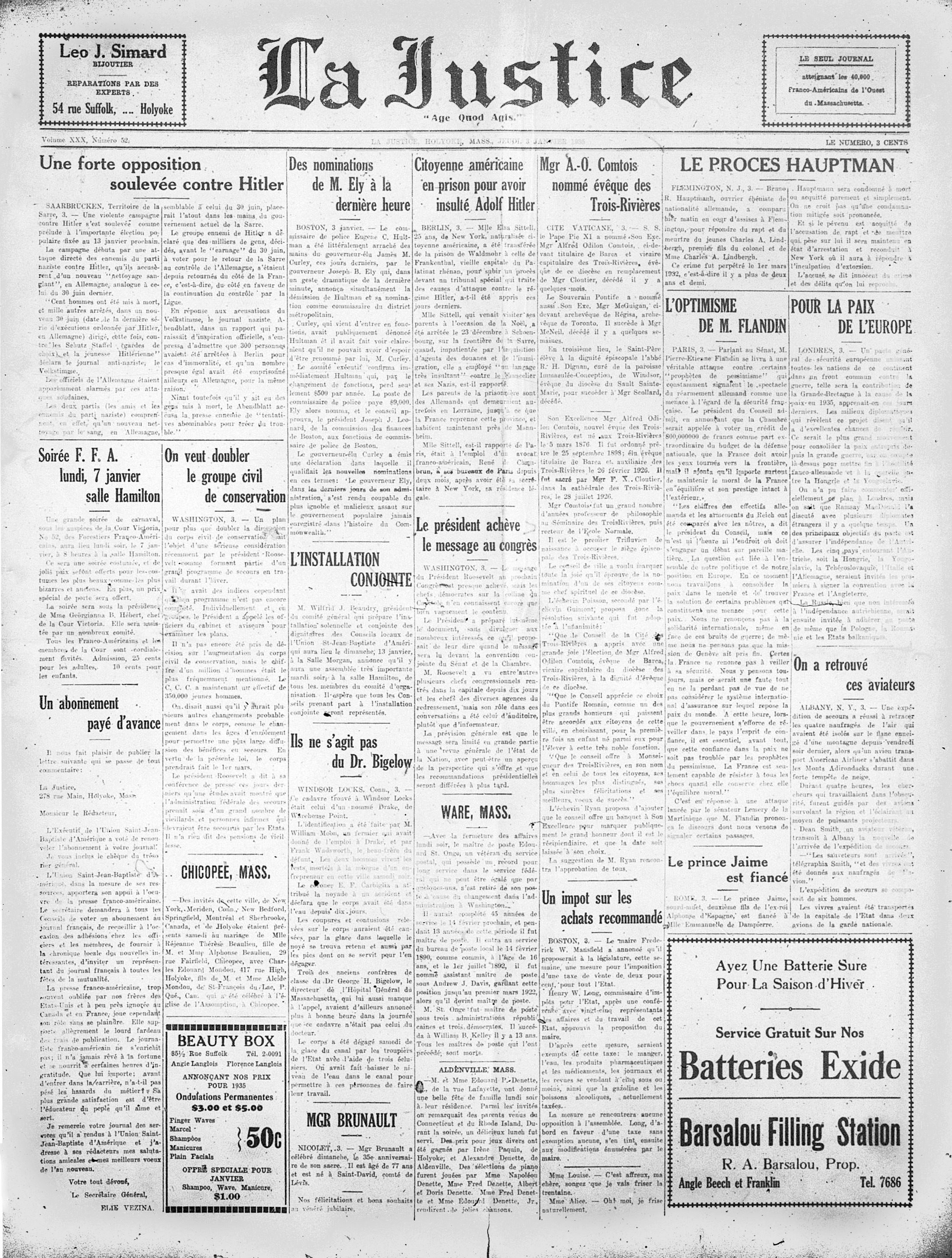
- Type: Weekly newspaper
- Format: Broadsheet
- Publisher: LaJustice Publishing Company, Inc. (dissolved 1983)
- Founded: 1904
- Ceased publication: 1964
- Language: French (New England French)
- Headquarters: 276-278 Main Street, Holyoke, Massachusetts 01040 United States
- Circulation: 4,500 (1922)
- ISSN: 1053-3117
- OCLC number: 9585230

La Justice was a weekly New England French newspaper published by the LaJustice Publishing Company of Holyoke, Massachusetts from 1904 until 1964, with issues printed biweekly during its final six years. Throughout its history the newspaper reported local as well as syndicated international news in French, along with regular columns by its editorship discussing Franco-American identity.

== History ==
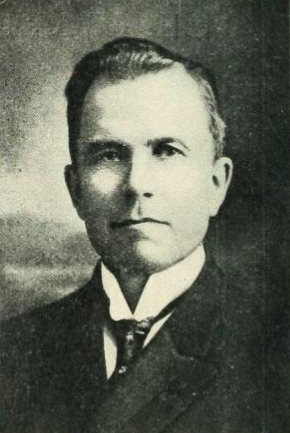
Joseph Lussier, publisher and editor-in-chief of La Justice (1908–1940) and recipient of the Palmes Académiques

Founded in 1904 by Dr. Henry E. Chaput, the paper was most associated with its subsequent publisher-editor, Joseph Lussier. Indeed Lussier was largely responsible for the growth of the paper, purchasing it in 1908 and assuming control in April 1909, as editor he transformed it from a small political organ of the city's French speakers into a widely-respected newspaper. In the early 20th century La Justice and its staff quickly became a cultural institution for Massachusetts Francophones, and at the end of the First World War, Lussier was among those invited by Governor McCall to join the state reception for the Commission for Relief in Belgium. For his work on the paper and dedication to the French language and culture, Lussier was awarded the Palmes Académiques, presented by the supreme secretary of the Saint-Jean-Baptiste Society, on behalf of the French Consul General of New York Charles de Ferry de Fontnouvelle at the Valley Arena Gardens on January 14, 1934. Lussier would own and operate the paper for much of its existence, before ultimately selling it to one Jacques Ducharme in 1940, who was the author of novel The Delusson Family, a fictional portrayal of French-Canadian life in Holyoke. Ducharme however would not enjoy operating a newspaper, saying in his 1943 Franco-American history book The Shadows of the Trees that more of his time was devoted to managing fluctuations in advertising revenue than editorial work. While it is not clear if the column originated prior to Ducharme, at that time the paper included a column – "Holyoke Thirty Years Ago", and despite financial strains, he would note the weekly's popularity with second generation students studying French, as well as young women, drawn to the paper's feuilletons, columns of serial fiction. Ducharme would sell the weekly to Roméo-Dadace Raymond in 1941; Raymond, who had worked at the paper since 1932, subsequently sold it to his son Gerry Raymond in 1957. With his son managing the business, R. D. Raymond continued as editor of the paper until his death on December 26, 1963. His children, no longer found solid revenue from the paper, and despite a desire to continue, would publish its last issue on January 13, 1964. Gerry Raymond would continue operating the business solely as a printing house and publishing firm until 1982 when he sold the business.

Throughout its history, the paper's writers regularly explored what the integration of Holyoke and Western Massachusetts' French Canadians into other American cultures meant for their own, their language, and role in the fabric of the greater community. A regular column discussing Franco-American life would also be published in English in the paper's later years.

=== Reorganization ===
After the paper ceased publication in 1964, its parent company, LaJustice Publishing continued as a printing firm for several years, often receiving contracts for city printing jobs, including publishing a history of the city's Franco-American community for its centennial in 1973. In 1982, Gerry Raymond retired and sold the firm to Edward J. Sullivan, who dissolved the corporation in 1983, and reorganized it as LaJustice Printing. In 2007 it was purchased by his daughter Kathleen Lynch, who continued to operate it as a small commercial printing firm; the company remained active in some form as recently as March 2018.

== See also ==
- History of the French in Holyoke
