= Rock Valley, Holyoke, Massachusetts =

Rock Valley
- Neighborhood of Holyoke
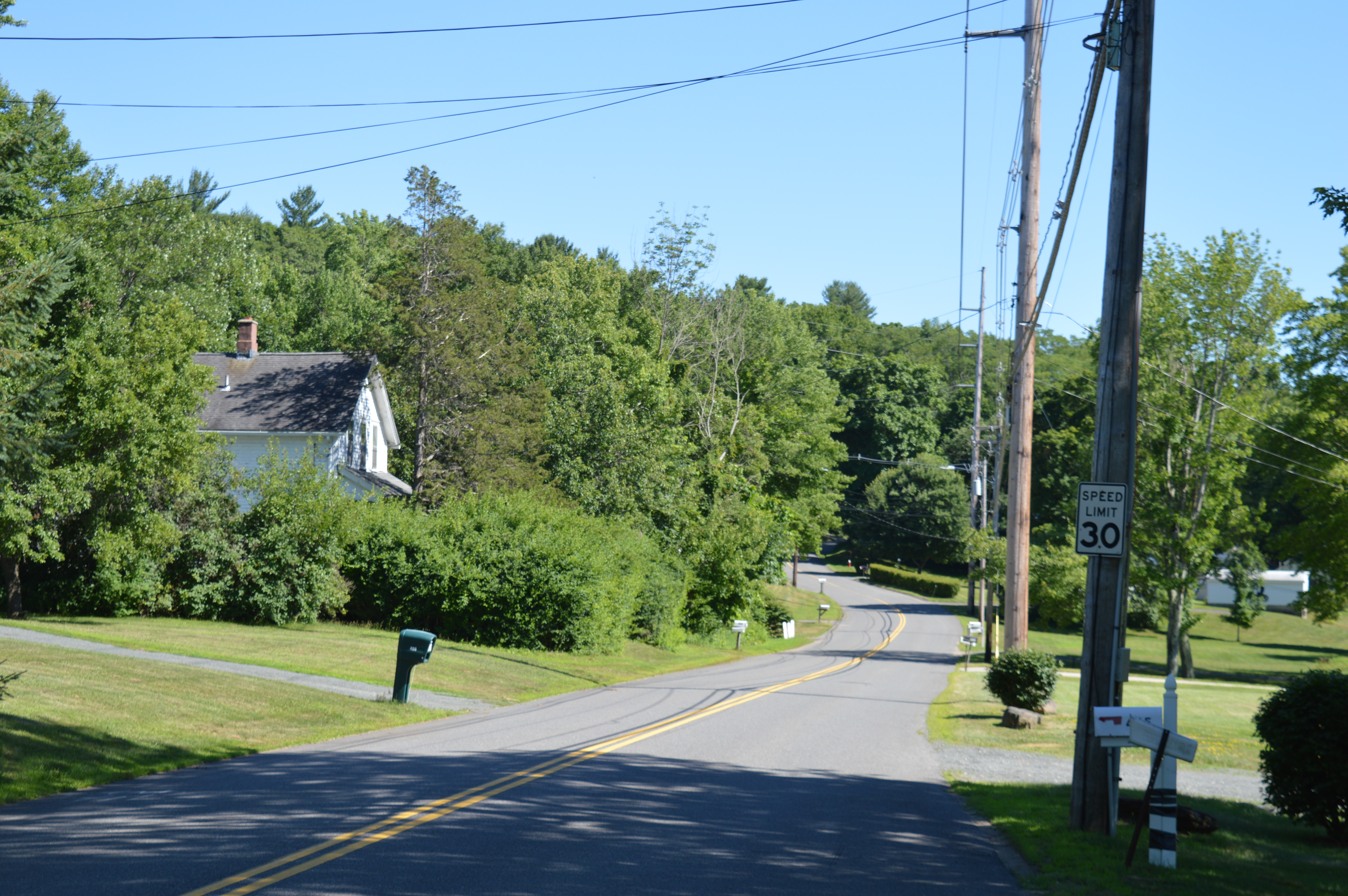
- Rock Valley Road streetscape

- Location within Holyoke Location within Massachusetts Location within the United States
- Coordinates: 42°11′38.33″N 72°40′33.33″W
- Country: United States
- State: Massachusetts
- City: Holyoke
- Wards: 5, 7
- Precincts: 5A, 7A
- Settled: c. 1745

Area
  - Total: 5.95 sq mi (15.4 km^{2})
- Elevation: 312 ft (95 m)
- ZIP code: 01040
- Area code: 413
- GNIS feature ID: 608798

Rock Valley, sometimes referred to as West Holyoke, is a neighborhood in Holyoke, Massachusetts located to the west of the city center, approximately 3 miles (4.8 km) from downtown, bordering Easthampton, Southampton, Westfield, and West Springfield. Rock Valley is historically Holyoke's second oldest village after Elmwood, with its eponymous burial ground dating to around 1777, and families having settled in the area as early as 1745. Predating the construction of the Hadley Falls Dam, it originated as the western section of the 3rd parish ("Ireland Parish") of West Springfield. Today, the neighborhood contains several historic Federal and Colonial homesteads, in addition to many modern developments adjacent to agricultural and wetland tracts.

Even into the 20th century, the area retained an agrarian character, but was met with concern by residents who believed their neighborhood to be falling behind the progress made by the rest of the city during its sudden industrial growth. In 1921, the West Holyoke Improvement Association was founded by a number of concerned for the purpose of representing the interests of the neighborhood before the city government. Renamed the Rock Valley Improvement League in 1955, among the issues they lobbied for was the electrification of streets lights in the area, construction of a community center, and development of new playgrounds for children. The association would hold many neighborhood dinners and events for a number of years as well, and having achieved many of the aforementioned goals fell into relative obscurity.

In 1930, the area briefly gained international attention when a former supply route to Westfield built by soldiers of the 104th Infantry was dedicated in Massachusetts as the Apremont Highway in a joint ceremony between Holyoke and Westfield. The 104th was the first American military unit to receive a foreign decoration for valor and the first foreign recipients of the French Croix de Guerre, for liberating Apremont-la-Forêt in the First World War.
