= Jeanne Kissner =

Jeanne Kissner (1942 - 19 February 1999) was an American student of Quebec studies. She was president of the American Council for Quebec Studies from 1988 to 1990 and a member of the AATF executive board for four years. She was co-chairperson of the National Consortium for Teaching Canada from 1992 to 1996 and a founding member of the Association internationale d'etudes quebecoises in 1997.

She was praised by Louise Beaudoin, Quebec Minister for International Affairs, for her contribution to Quebec studies who said "Par sa curiosite, sa conscience professionnelle, son sens de l'amitie, elle a contribue plus que quiconque a etendre la comprehension du Quebec."

In 2000 she was the subject of a festschrift titled Women Writing in Quebec; Essays in Honor of Jeanne Kissner published by Plattsburgh State University.
