= American Council for Quebec Studies =

Council of academics who study French culture in North America

Quebec Studies
- Discipline: Area studies
- Language: English

Standard abbreviations
- ISO 4: Que. Stud.

Indexing
- ISSN: 0737-3759 (print); 2052-1731 (web)

American Council for Quebec Studies logo

The American Council for Quebec Studies was founded in 1981 and consists of academics who study the "histories, literatures, politics, cultures, and languages of Québec, Francophone Canada, and Franco-America." It produces the peer-reviewed academic journal Quebec Studies which is published by Liverpool University Press.

In 2005, the council received the Prix du 3-juillet-1608 of the Conseil supérieur de la langue française in recognition of its services to the French-language community of North America.

== List of presidents ==
- Edwin Hamblet, 1981-1982
- André Sénécal, 1983-1984
- Jeanne Kissner, 1985-1986
- Robert Schwartzwald, 1987-1990
- Robert Gill, 1990-1992
- Jane Moss, 1992-1995
- Richard Beach, 1995-1997
- Emile Talbot, 1997-1999
- Robert Whelan, 1999-2001
- Roseanna L. Dufault, 2001-2003
- Kevin J. Christiano, 2003-2005
- Raymond Pelletier, 2005-2007
- Juliette Rogers, 2007-2009
- David Massell, 2009-2011
- Amy Reid, 2011-2013
- Leslie Choquette, 2013-2015
- Sam Fisher, 2015-2017
- Charles R. Batson, 2017-2019

== See also ==
- Association internationale des études québécoises
