= Consulate General of France, New York City =

Consular representation of the French Republic to the US

Coordinates: 40.7739°N 73.9656°W

Consulate General of France in New York City
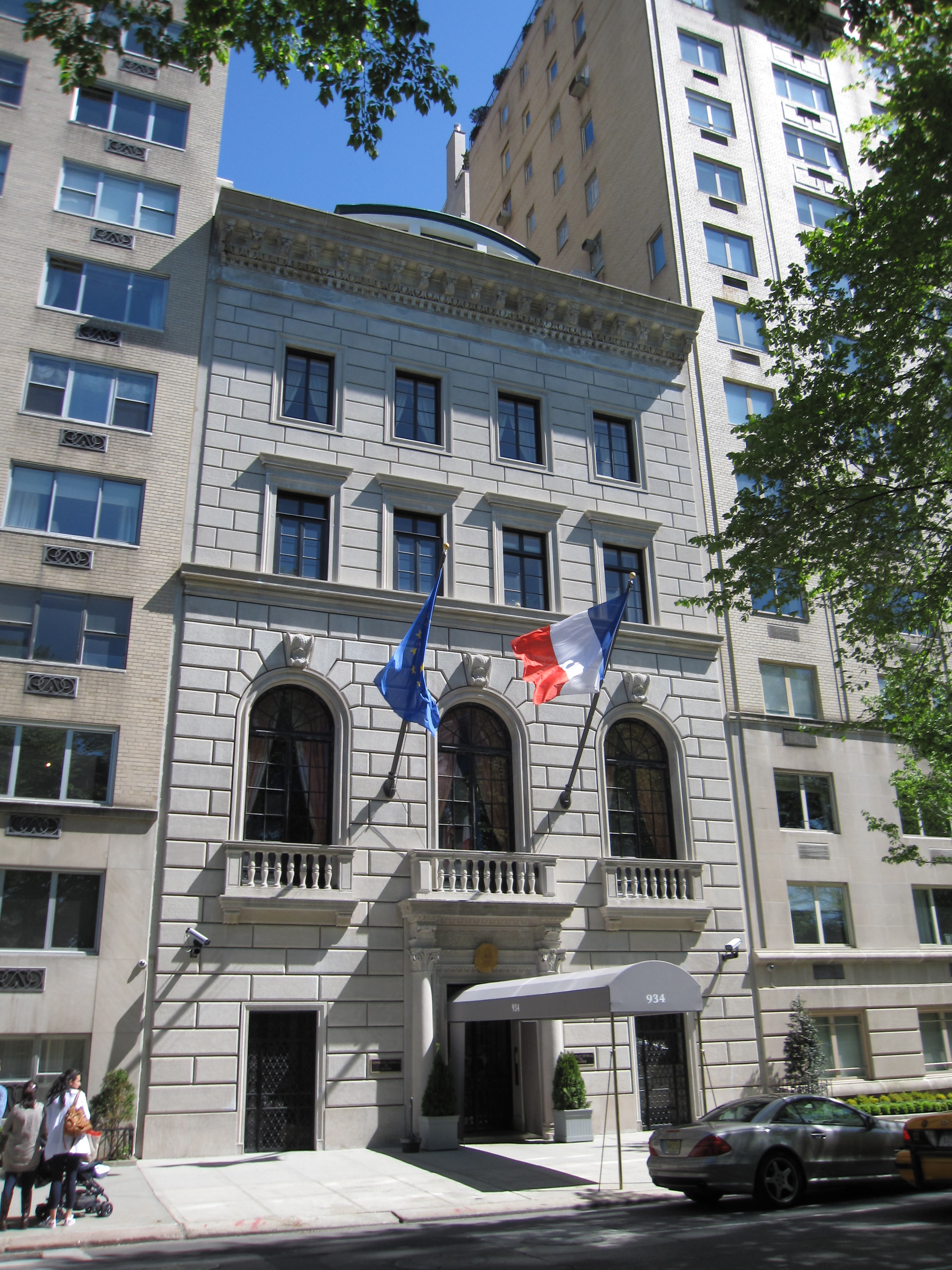
- Charles E. Mitchell House, French consulate in New York City
- Location: New York, New York, United States
- Address: 934 Fifth Avenue

The French Consulate General is a consular representation of the French Republic to the United States, located in New York City, New York. The consulate general is housed in the Charles E. Mitchell House, at 934 Fifth Avenue, between East 74th and 75th Streets on the Upper East Side of Manhattan.

The consulate's mission is to provide protection and administrative services to French citizens living or traveling in the district. Under the authority of the French Embassy in the United States, its consular district extends across three states (New York, Connecticut, and New Jersey), as well as the British Overseas Territory of Bermuda.

Currently housing the consulate general of France, 934 Fifth Avenue was the residence of Charles E. Mitchell, President of the National City Bank (now Citibank). Cédrik Fouriscot has been the consul general since May 2024.

== Charles E. Mitchell House ==
The Italian Renaissance-style townhouse, designed by architects A. Stewart Walker and Leon N. Gillette, was built between 1925 and 1926 on Fifth Avenue for Charles E. Mitchell.

While residing at 934 Fifth Avenue, from 1925 to 1933, Mitchell served as informal advisor to American Presidents Warren G. Harding and Herbert Hoover. But the prestige of this address owed in great part to his wife, Elizabeth Mitchell, who hosted numerous musical evenings at the house. Musicians such as George Gershwin, Fritz Kreisler, Rudolph Ganz, Ignay Padrewski, and José Iturbi regularly gave recitals in the "Pink Room" at 934 Fifth Avenue.

In the early 1930s, following the stock exchange crash and investigations into his financial activities, Charles E. Mitchell lost most of his fortune and had to give up his residence. Number 934 is the only survivor of the seven townhouses that formerly lined this block. Within 50 years, the first houses built in the 1880s were replaced by equally luxurious large apartment buildings. The Charles E. Mitchell House was preserved thanks to the decision of the French government, which acquired it in 1942 and made it the official consulate general building.

== History of the consulate ==
=== Before the consulate ===
As historic partners, France and the United States have maintained ties of friendship and cooperation since the first days of the American nation. The first French consular representation was established in Philadelphia in 1778. As soon as 1783, a French consulate was founded in New York, the first consulate to be established in this city. John Hector St. John de Crèvecœur became the first consul. However, very little information is available on the buildings that housed the consulate over the 18th centuries.

During the First World War, the French consulate general in New York City was located at 8 Bridge Street, Manhattan.

From 1933 to 1942, the consulate general of France was located at Rockefeller Center, at 640 Fifth Avenue. As prestigious as this address was, it was decided, in 1941, to acquire another building that could house the offices and residence of the consul. In 1942, 934 Fifth Avenue became French property. But it wasn't until 1943, after Franco-American relationships were reestablished (following an interruption under the Vichy regime), that consular affairs resumed with the French resistance representatives.

In keeping with the spirit of its founders, Charles E. Mitchell and his wife, who conceived the 934 as a place for culture, with an emphasis on literature and music, the consulate has perpetuated this tradition and welcomes, every year, numerous receptions involving the French community. The consulate hosts up to 150 events every year, including the monthly Conferences@934, which bring together French and American speakers.

=== List of the consuls general of France in New York City ===
The successive consuls have been:

Consul general	Decree of nomination
J. Hector St John de Crèvecoeur	1783
Antoine-René-Charles-Mathurin de La Forest (interim)	1785
J. Hector St John de Crèvecœur	1787
...	
Pierre Jean-Marie Sotin de La Coindière	1798
...	
Alcide Ebray	
Étienne Lanel	February, 1907
Marie Gabriel Georges Bosseront d'Anglade	November 4, 1913
Gaston Ernest Liébert	January 4, 1916
Barret	March 19, 1923
Charles de Ferry de Fontnouvelle	1931
...	
Roger Seydoux	September 23, 1950
Jean Vyau de Lagarde	1952
Jacques Baeyens	May 20, 1957
Raymond Laporte	November 24, 1958
Michel Legendre	April 2, 1963
Jean Béliard	December 10, 1968
Henri Claudel	October 14, 1969
Gérard Gaussen	1972
Gérard Le Saige de la Villesbrunne	1978
Bertrand de la Taillade	1981
André Gadaud	1984
Benoît d'Aboville	1989
André Baeyens	July 15, 1993
Patrick Gautrat	January 3, 1996
Richard Duqué	January 16, 1998
François Delattre	June 21, 2004
Guy Yelda	May 19, 2008
Philippe Lalliot	May 15, 2009
Bertrand Lortholary	August 22, 2012
Anne-Claire Legendre	August 29, 2016
Jérémie Robert	July 31, 2020
Cédrik Fouriscot	May 2, 2024

=== Honorary consulates ===
The consulate general of France in New York City supervises four honorary consuls, located respectively in the following cities:

- Hamilton (Bermuda)
- Hartford (Connecticut)
- Princeton (New Jersey)
- Buffalo (New York)

== See also ==
- France–United States relations
- List of diplomatic missions of France
- Embassy of France, Washington, D.C.
- Payne Whitney House, New York, locations of the embassy's cultural office
