= Holyoke Credit Union =

- Company type: Credit union
- Industry: Financial services
- Predecessor: Notre Dame du Perpetuel Secours Credit Union of Holyoke
- Founded: 1911
- Headquarters: Holyoke, Massachusetts, United States
- Area served: Holyoke, West Springfield, and Feeding Hills
- Products: Savings; checking; consumer loans; mortgages; credit cards; online banking
- Website: www.holyokecu.com

Holyoke Credit Union is a non-profit financial co-operative chartered by the Commonwealth of Massachusetts, and headquartered in Holyoke, Massachusetts. Established on September 7, 1911, the credit union was originally known as Notre Dame du Perpetuel Secours Credit Union of Holyoke and was open to the public, but strongly encouraged membership amongst school children of Holyoke's French-Canadian parochial schools at the time. On December 27, 1918, the name was changed to the present one, and today is open to anyone living or working in the Hampden and Hampshire counties of Massachusetts.

Holyoke Credit Union is a member of the National Credit Union Administration (NCUA) and the SUM ATM network.
