= Apremont-la-Forêt =

Apremont
- Commune
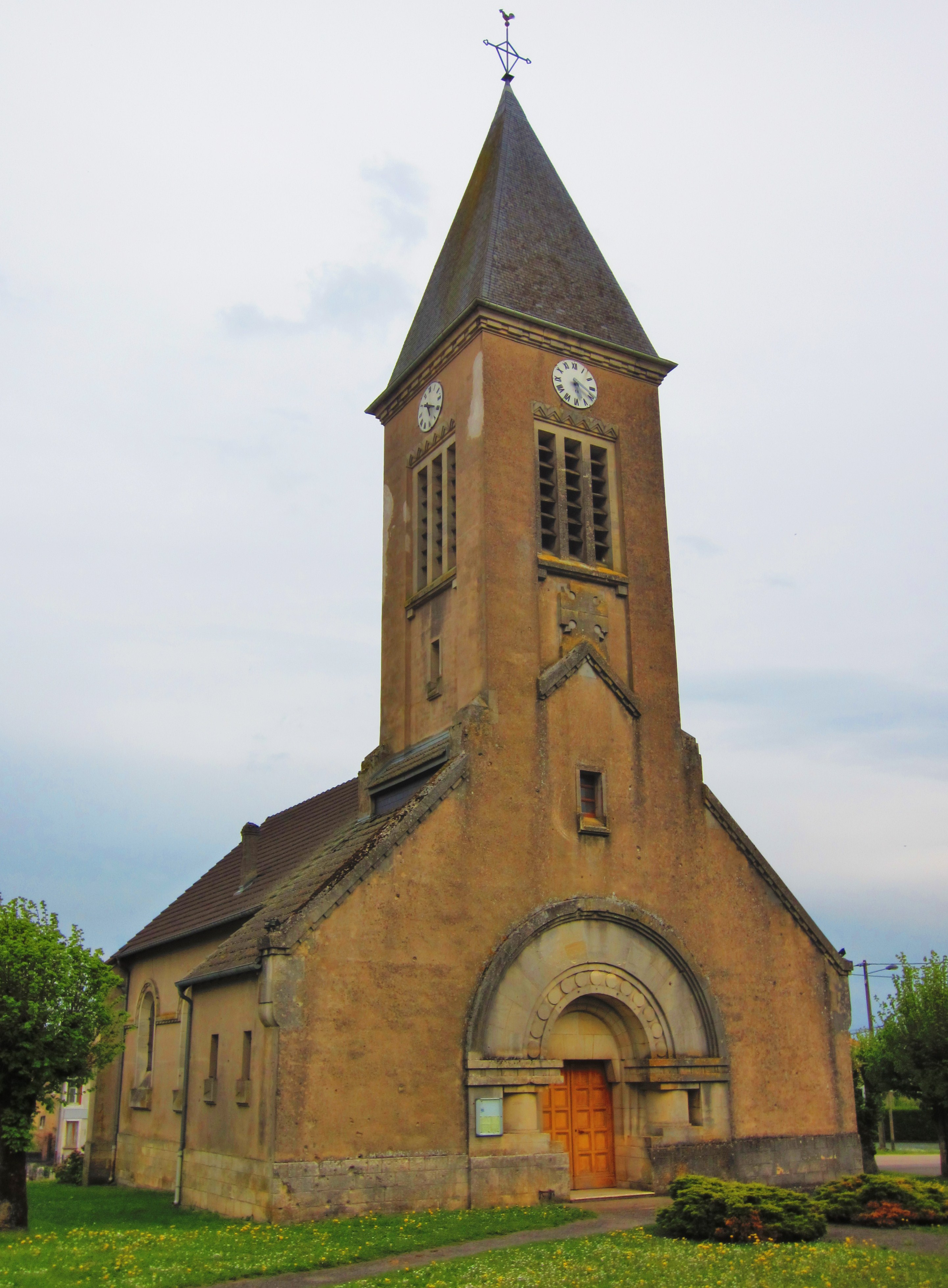
- The church in Apremont-la-Forêt

- Coat of arms
- Location of Apremont
- Location within France Location within Grand Est
- Coordinates: 48°51′22″N 5°38′23″E
- Country: France
- Region: Grand Est
- Department: Meuse
- Arrondissement: Commercy
- Canton: Lionel Plantegenet

Government
  - Mayor (2020–2026): René Huret
- Area^{1}: 32.89 km^{2} (12.70 sq mi)
- Highest elevation: 383 m (1,257 ft)
- Lowest elevation: 231 m (758 ft)
- Population (2023): 427
  - Density: 13.0/km^{2} (33.6/sq mi)
- Time zone: UTC+01:00 (CET)
  - Summer (DST): UTC+02:00 (CEST)
- INSEE/Postal code: 55012 /55300
- ^{1} French Land Register data, which excludes lakes, ponds, glaciers > 1 km^{2} (0.386 sq mi or 247 acres) and river estuaries.

Apremont-la-Forêt (French pronunciation: [apʁəmɔ̃ la fɔʁɛ], before 1962: Apremont) is a commune in the Meuse department in the Grand Est region in northeastern France. In January 1973, it absorbed the former communes Marbotte, Liouville and Saint-Agnant-sous-les-Côtes.

== Population ==
Historical population
Year	Pop.	±% p.a.
1968	367	—
1975	326	−1.68%
1982	284	−1.95%
1990	342	+2.35%
1999	337	−0.16%
2007	400	+2.17%
2012	393	−0.35%
2017	397	+0.20%
2023	427	+1.22%
Source: INSEE

== See also ==
- Communes of the Meuse department
- Parc naturel régional de Lorraine
