= Charles de Ferry de Fontnouvelle =

Count Charles de Ferry de Fontnouvelle
- Portrait of Charles de Ferry de Fontnouvelle, date unknown

President of the Lycée Français de New York
- In office 1935–1956

Consulate general of France in New York
- In office 1931–1940

Personal details
- Born: March 21, 1877 Le Château-d'Oléron, French Third Republic
- Died: April 25, 1956 (aged 79) Glen Cove, New York (state)
- Profession: Diplomat educator politician

Charles Hippolyte Marie de Ferry de Fontnouvelle, more commonly known as Count Charles de Ferry de Fontnouvelle or Charles de Fontnouvelle (March 21, 1877 – April 25, 1956), was a French diplomat and pedagogue, who was the Consulate general of France in New York from 1931 to 1940, and was the founder of the Lycée Français de New York. Born in 1877 at Le Château-d'Oléron on the Île d'Oléron, he attended the School of Political Science at Avignon Université. During his career with the French foreign service, he retained many positions worldwide, including as a member of the French Legation of Mexico City during President Porfirio Díaz's reign, and as consul in Bremen, Lisbon, San Juan, Turin, Liverpool, and Chicago. The Count was an honorary member of the Society of the Cincinnati, an officier of the Legion of Honor, and a member of the Portuguese Order of Christ. The Count had a great affinity for the culture of the United States and sought to strengthen ties between the two countries in cultural exchange. In 1935, at the height of the Great Depression, he established the Lycée Français de New York with the help of French and American officials and a total of only 24 initial students. Today the school, with excess of 1,000 students typically enrolled gives the Prix Charles de Ferry de Fontnouvelle, to honor those who support its educational programs and foster greater cultural exchange between France, the greater Francophone diaspora, and the United States.

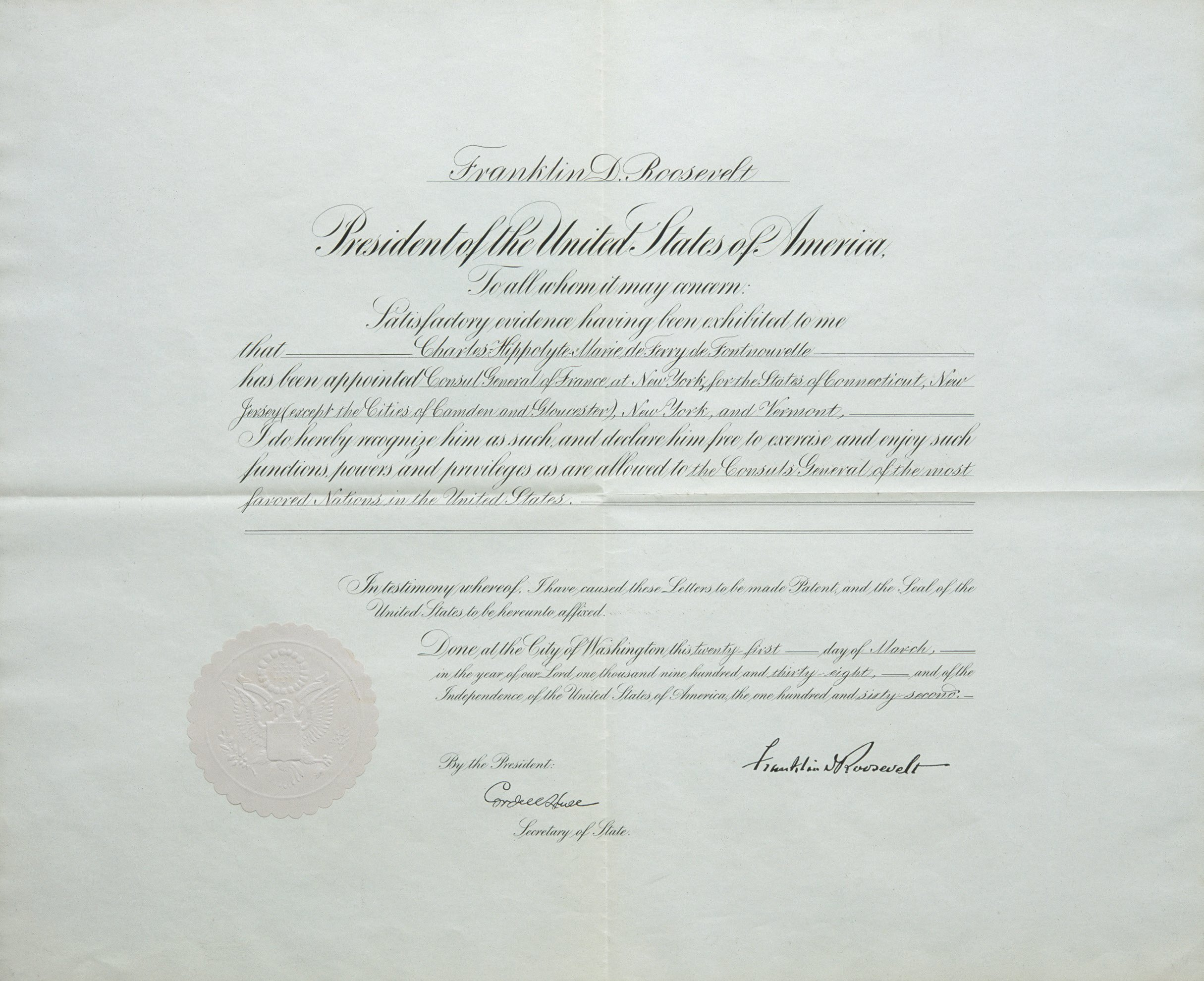
Exequatur signed by President Franklin Delano Roosevelt recognizing French Consul Charles de Ferry de Fontnouvelle in 1938, and countersigned by Cordell Hull, Secretary of State
